= 1731 English cricket season =

Cricket season review

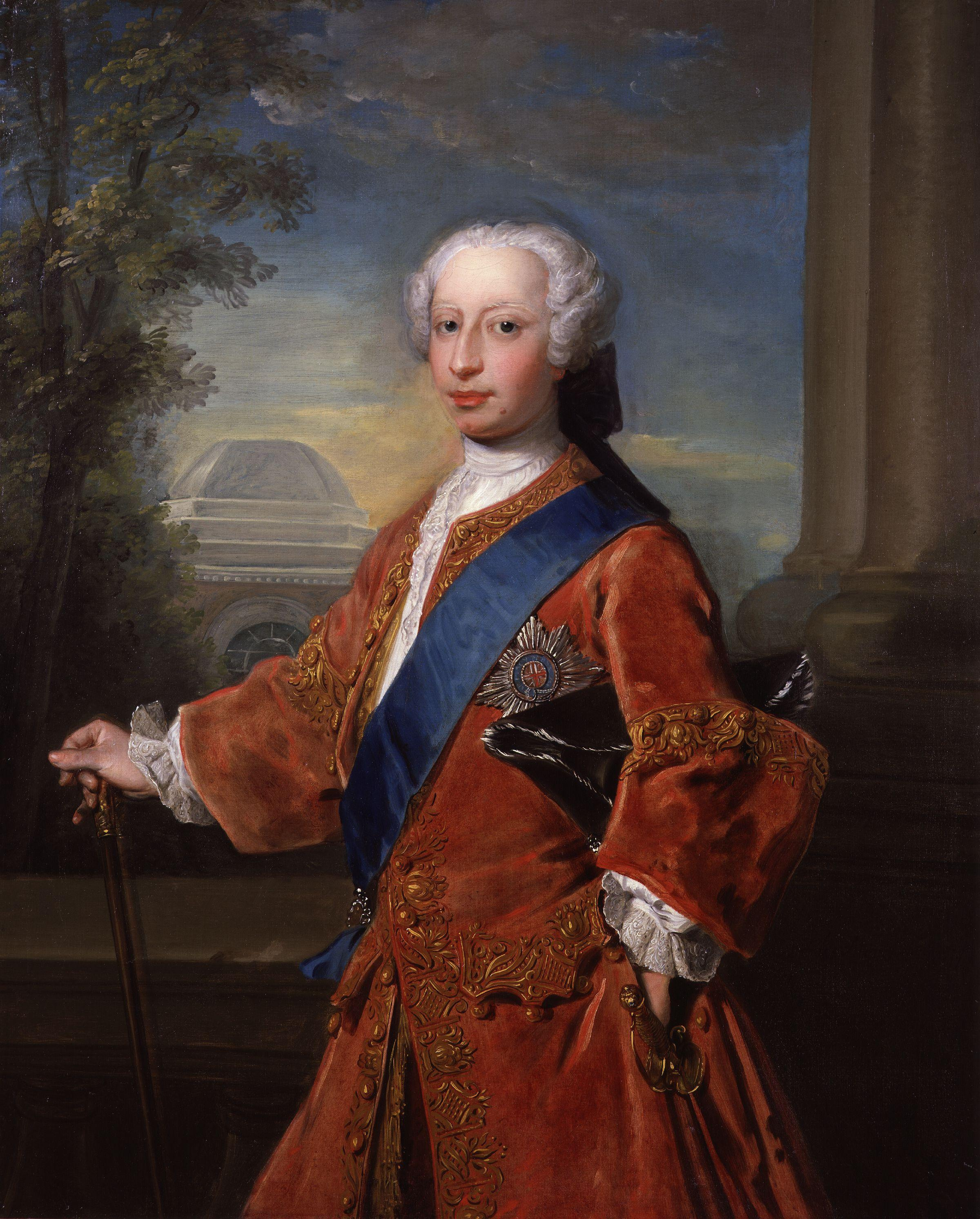
Frederick, Prince of Wales. Portrait by Philippe Mercier, 1736.

In the 1731 English cricket season, a total of 31 historically important matches are known to have been arranged, more than double the number in 1730, though it is not certain they were all actually played. (Note: Any match listed in the ACS' Important Match Guide (1981) is historically important, and therefore of the highest standard, whether or not a scorecard might exist. The same applies to numerous matches discovered by researchers since 1981. For further information, see First-class cricket.) Seventeen involved the London Cricket Club, who played six of their twelve home games on the Artillery Ground in Finsbury. Although newspaper coverage was increasing, the notices carried were always brief, and it remained rare for a player to be named in the press. However, this did happen when "the famous Tim Coleman", of London, was mentioned after he played for another team as a given man.

The most controversial match of the season, which ended in a riot, was also the first from which team totals are known. Elsewhere, the Prince of Wales is known to have taken an interest in the sport, and he became a noted patron until his death in 1751.

== Riot on Richmond Green ==
On 23 August, a Monday, there was a riot on Richmond Green when crowd anger exploded after the 2nd Duke of Richmond insisted upon strict adherence to the Articles of Agreement drawn by himself and his opponent Thomas Chambers (1677–1750), a Middlesex patron who was a great-grandfather of Lord Frederick Beauclerk.

23 August 1731

2nd Duke of Richmond's XI	v	Thomas Chambers' XI
79		119
72		23/5 (approx.)

drawn; Duke of Richmond later conceded
Richmond Green
Umpires: not known

- This match is the earliest from which team totals are known, but no individual batting or bowling performances were recorded.

The match was the third, possibly a decider, played between these two teams who had met on each of the two previous Mondays—the first was at Richmond Green on the 9th (result unknown) with a return at Chichester on the 16th (Chambers won). The start and finish times, specified in the Articles, were two pm and seven pm. Richmond and his team arrived late, so start of play was delayed. Evidently, the large crowd expected the lost time to be added on at the end. Richmond, whose team were losing, insisted on ending the match as soon as the clock struck seven. The gambling odds were on Chambers, and his backers were furious that Richmond would not play on, so they rioted.

According to the London Evening Post:

Chambers' team coming in again wanted about 8 or 10 notches when the hour agreed on being come, they were obliged to leave off, though the hands then playing, they had four of five more to come in. Thus it proved a drawn battle.

The match is significant in another aspect because it is the earliest of which team totals are known, though no individual scores were recorded. Richmond's XI batted first and were all out for 79, to which Chambers' XI replied with 119 for a first innings lead of 40. Richmond's XI were dismissed for 72 in their second innings, leaving Chambers' XI with a target of 33 to win. Their precise total at the end is uncertain, but the wording of the report suggests they had scored from 23 to 25 runs for the loss of five or six wickets.

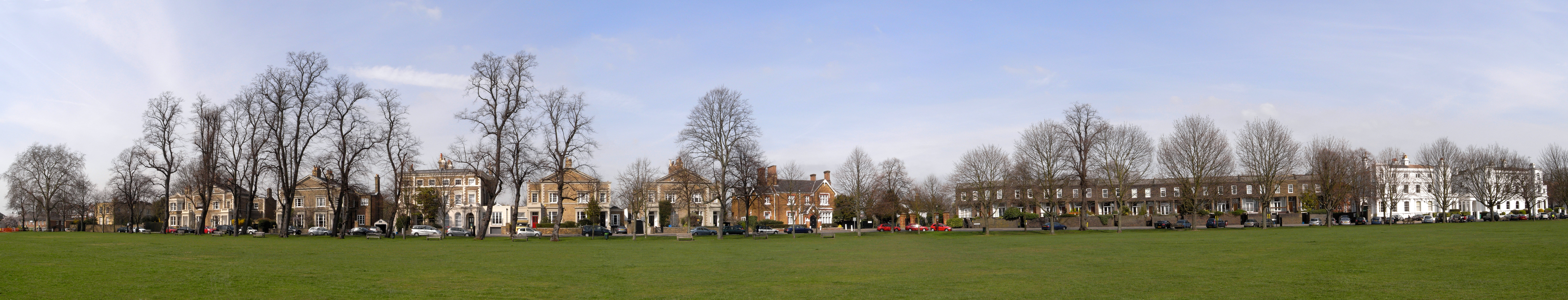
The northern half of Richmond Green today

During the riot, some of Richmond's players had "the shirts torn off their backs", and one report said "a law suit would commence about the play". However, the brief report of a different match on 6 September implied that Richmond had conceded the result to Chambers: "11 of Surrey beat the 11 who about a fortnight ago beat the Duke of Richmond's men".

== County cricket ==
Teams that were nominally counties took part in ten matches altogether. Nomenclature at this time was indefinite, so a team called Kent or Surrey might actually have been Dartford or Chertsey, for example. London Cricket Club played four matches against teams with county names: Kent on 24 May (Kent won by 3 runs) and 8 June (London won); Surrey on 17 April (London won by 35 runs) and 28 September (result unknown). Surrey defeated Thomas Chambers' XI on 6 September, as mentioned above, and played two other matches against parish teams; Kent also played one against parish opposition.

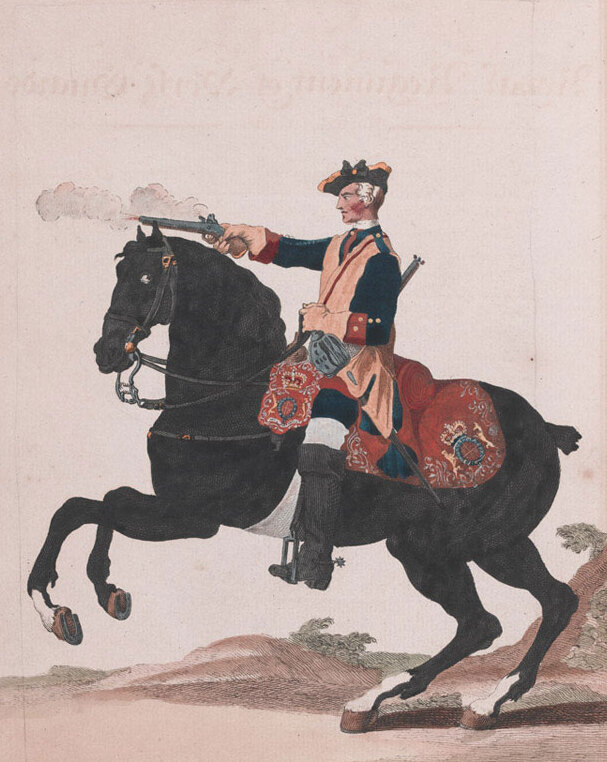
c. 1742 engraving of a Royal Horse Guards trooper

Only two matches were "inter-county", inasmuch as both teams had county names. These were Kent v Middlesex at Kennington Common on 19 July, and Surrey v Kent at Dulwich Common on 4 September. The Kent v Middlesex match was billed in advance as "the County of Kent v. the County of Middlesex, for £50 a side", but the result is unknown. In the second match, Surrey in their second innings needed twelve to win with three wickets in hand when heavy rain began, and the result was a draw.

== London matches ==
In addition to their matches against county teams, London played five against Dartford Cricket Club, and four against Croydon. All of London's home games were played on the Artillery Ground; Dartford played on Dartford Brent, and Croydon at Duppas Hill. Little is known of these nine matches except, mostly, the results. Croydon won all four of their matches against London, including the fourth which counted as a replay following a dispute about the outcome of the third. London had some success against Dartford, winning the first match on the Artillery Ground by 15 runs. Two of the other matches were drawn, and two left no result.

== Single wicket ==
Only one single wicket match is in the known records. It was played in July, at a venue in Maidstone, between two Royal Horse Guards officers called Captain Beak and Lieutenant Coke. The brief report said "a considerable sum of money" was at stake, and Beak won after three hours "very hard played".

The main source for this match is H. T. Waghorn, who remarked that it was the first "military match" he found in his researches. Nothing is known about the playing standards of Beak or Coke, or if either of them played for Kent or another county, but many Army officers did play in important matches through the 18th and 19th centuries. Two examples were Colonel Charles Lennox (1764–1819) and Captain Charles Cumberland (1764–1835), both members of the White Conduit Club and, in 1787, original members of Marylebone Cricket Club (MCC). Colonel Lennox became the 4th Duke of Richmond in 1806, and was the 2nd Duke's grandson.

== Other matches ==
date	match title	venue	result	source
31 May (M)	London v Sevenoaks	Kennington Common	result unknown
notes	Advance notice was given of this game and the one below, both at the same venue.
1 June (Tu)	London v Chelsfield	Kennington Common	London won
notes	London played Chelsfield, then in Kent, in an evening match with a stake of 30 guineas. This is the only time a Chelsfield team appears in the sources.
18 June (F)	London v Enfield	Lamb's Conduit Field	London won by 14 runs
notes	This is the only time an Enfield team is recorded in surviving sources.
26 June (S)	Sunbury v Kent	Sunbury Common	Sunbury won by "several notches"
notes	Played for 30 guineas a side. The Kent side was organised by Edwin Stead of Maidstone. Sunbury had a leading team at the time.
12 July (M)	London v Sevenoaks	Kennington Common	result unknown
notes	This game is the first known to have been played in an enclosed ground, though with only a rope around the field. The newspaper report says: "the ground will be roped round and all persons are desired to keep without side of the same". The stakes were "a guinea a man"; wickets to be pitched "by one o'clock".
12 July (M)	Surrey v East Grinstead	Smitham Bottom, Coulsdon	East Grinstead won by 5 wickets
notes	This is the only time an East Grinstead team is recorded in surviving sources.
13 July (Tu)	Chelsea v Fulham	Chelsea Common	Fulham won
notes	The Chelsea and Fulham teams are rarely mentioned in the sources but seem to have played for high stakes in matches reported by the press. Their playing strengths cannot now be ascertained.
14 July (W)	Hampton v Brentford	Moulsey Hurst	result unknown
notes	This match was pre-announced with: "We hear that above £500 is already laid on their heads, neither party having yet been beat".
9 August (M)	"A Great Cricket Match"	Richmond Green	result unknown
notes	The St James's Evening Post on 27–29 July announced "a great Cricket match" to be held "on Monday se'nnight" (i.e., Monday, 9 August, as the term means "a week on Monday") at Richmond Green for 100 guineas "by several persons of Distinction". The Prince of Wales was expected to be present. The match was discovered by a 21st-century researcher.
10 August (Tu)	Fulham v Chelsea	Parsons Green	Fulham won
notes	A return fixture to the one in Chelsea on Tuesday, 13 July.
6 September (M)	Surrey v Thomas Chambers' XI	Sanderstead Common	Surrey won
notes	The Daily Post Boy reported on Wednesday, 8 September that "11 of Surrey beat the 11 who about a fortnight ago beat the Duke of Richmond's men". See the game on Monday, 23 August above. The report suggests that the Duke of Richmond conceded his controversial game against Chambers.
? September	Surrey v Kingston	Moulsey Hurst	Surrey won
notes	The exact date is unknown. Played for 25 guineas a side and "some thousands of persons of both sexes were present on this occasion".
2 October (S)	Mitcham v Ewell	Mitcham Cricket Green	Mitcham won "by several notches"
notes	A newspaper report mentions that "the famous Tim Coleman" was in the Ewell team, adding that he usually played for London. It was rare at this time for a newspaper to name a player, and so Coleman is one of the earliest cricketers whose name has survived in contemporary records. The full span of his career is unknown.
2 October (S)	"A Great Cricket Match"	Artillery Ground	result unknown
notes	The source reports: "A great cricket match will be play'd in the Artillery Ground; it will be the last plaid (sic) this season; 11 of a side, stumps to be pitch'd exactly at 12 o'clock". Nothing further has been found and the match might not have been played.

== Ground enclosure ==
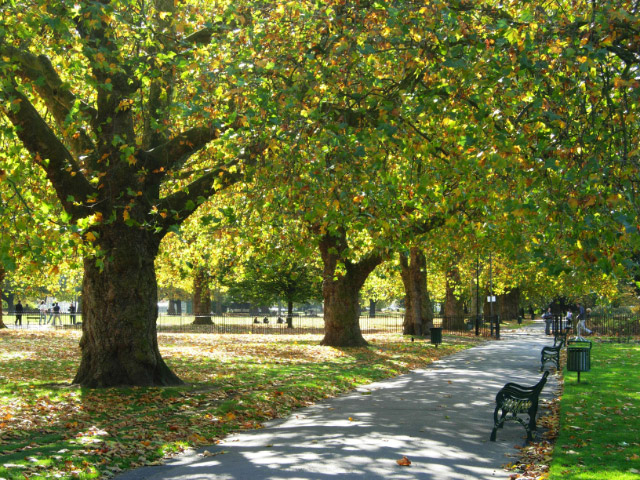
Part of Kennington Common that is now Kennington Park.

The earliest known ground enclosures were done this year. The playing area on Kennington Common was roped off twice in an attempt to keep spectators off the field. A notice for the London v Sevenoaks match on 12 July said the ground would be roped around, and all persons must stay outside of it.

Surrey v London on 28 September was promoted as "likely to be the best performance of this kind that has been seen for some time, there being great wagers depending", and the Prince of Wales was expected to attend. The notice also stated: "for the convenience of the gamesters, the ground is to be staked and roped out".

It is not known when admission fees were introduced but there was certainly a two pence charge in place at the Artillery Ground by the early 1740s.

== All the Woods ==
In July (exact date unknown), there was an unusual match at Duppas Hill, Croydon, when a Kent team played a Surrey team who were all called Wood. The Woods won. This is interesting given the well-documented confusion over different players called Wood or Woods in the 1770s.

== First mentions ==
=== Clubs and teams ===
- Thomas Chambers' XI
- Chelsea
- Chelsfield
- East Grinstead
- Enfield
- Ewell
- Sevenoaks

=== Players ===
- Thomas Chambers
- Tim Coleman
- Frederick, Prince of Wales
- Captain Beak
- Lieutenant Coke

=== Venues ===
- Chelsea Common
- Chichester (unspecified)
- Dulwich Common
- Maidstone (unspecified)
- Parsons Green
- Sanderstead Common
- Smitham Bottom
- Sunbury Common

== Bibliography ==
- ACS (1981). A Guide to Important Cricket Matches Played in the British Isles 1709–1863. Nottingham: ACS. OCLC 85045528.
- Buckley, G. B. (1935). Fresh Light on 18th Century Cricket. Birmingham: Cotterell & Co. OCLC 23450280.
- Major, John (2007). More Than A Game. London: HarperCollins. ISBN 978-00-07183-64-7 – via Internet Archive.
- Maun, Ian (2009). From Commons to Lord's, Volume One: 1700 to 1750. Cambridge: Roger Heavens. ISBN 978-19-00592-52-9.
- McCann, Tim (2004). Sussex Cricket in the Eighteenth Century (PDF). Vol. 88. Lewes: West Sussex Record Office. ISBN 978-08-54450-55-8.
- Waghorn, H. T. (1899). Cricket Scores, Notes, &c. From 1730–1773. Edinburgh: Blackwood. OCLC 1086375331.
- Waghorn, H. T. (2005) [1906]. The Dawn of Cricket. London: J. W. McKenzie. ISBN 978-09-47821-17-3.
