= 1741 English cricket season =

Cricket season review

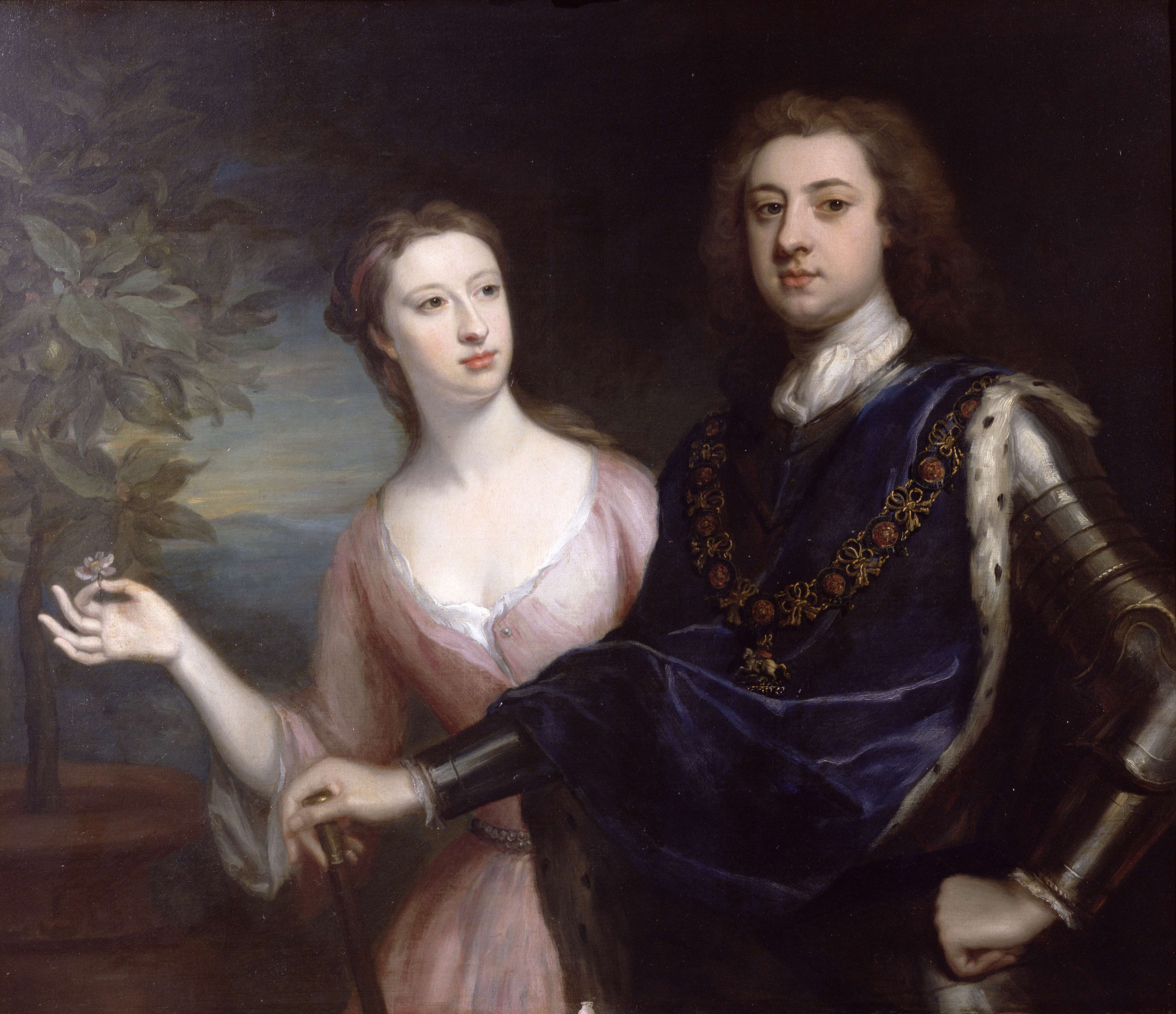
Portrait of the Duke and Duchess of Richmond. Painted by Jonathan Richardson in the 1720s.

The earliest known tie in an eleven-a-side match was recorded in the 1741 English cricket season. Among primary sources for the season are letters written by the Duke and Duchess of Richmond to each other, and to the Duke of Newcastle. One example is a gloating letter from Richmond to Newcastle after "poor little Slyndon (sic)" beat "almost your whole county of Surrey".

Meanwhile, the spread of cricket from the southeastern counties had continued into the south Midlands with three counties mentioned for the first time in surviving records.

Details of fourteen historically important matches are known. (Note: Any match listed in the ACS' Important Match Guide (1981) is historically important, and therefore of the highest standard, whether or not a scorecard might exist. The same applies to numerous matches discovered by researchers since 1981. For further information, see First-class cricket.)

== London v Surrey ==
London and Surrey played each other five times in 1741, including the earliest known tied match in eleven-a-side cricket.

Their first two games were played 1 and 15 June at Charlwood and the Artillery Ground respectively. Surrey won on 1 June. F. S. Ashley-Cooper noted in his personal copy of Waghorn that "London won" on 15 June, but his source has not been rediscovered.

The scores of the third match, played 22 July on Richmond Green, are not recorded but the result was "a Tye (sic), which occasioned the Betts (sic) to be drawn on both Sides". It is the earliest known instance of an eleven-a-side game being tied. The first-ever known tie was the single wicket "threes" match at Lamb's Conduit Field on Wednesday, 1 September 1736, between the same two teams.

The fourth and fifth matches were scheduled for 2 August and 14 September, both on the Artillery Ground. However, no post-match reports have been found.

== The Richmond letters ==
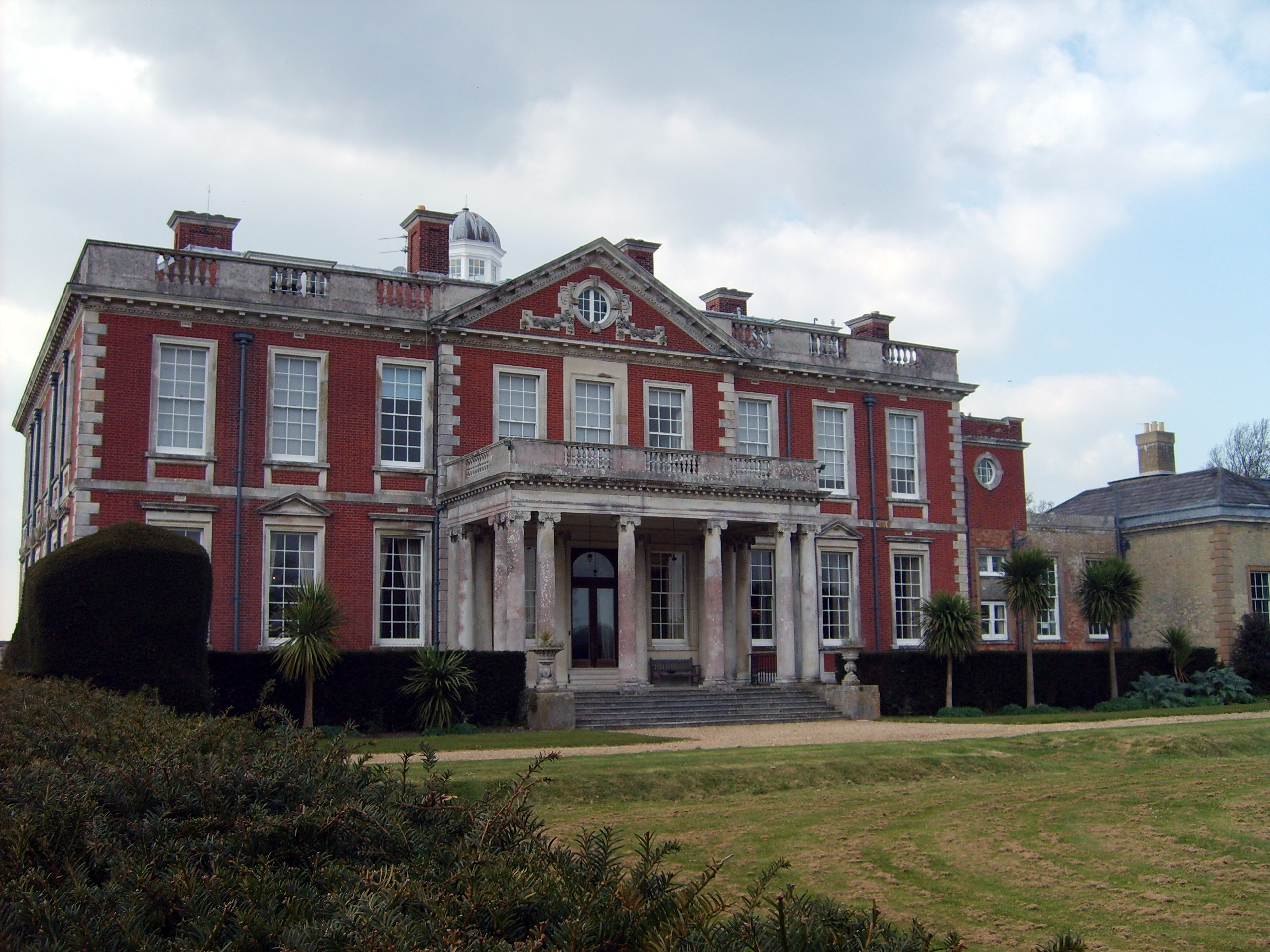
Stansted House is in Stansted Park, where Slindon played Portsmouth in June 1741.

Among the main primary sources for the events of the 1741 season are letters written by Charles Lennox, 2nd Duke of Richmond and his wife Duchess Sarah. She was formerly Lady Sarah Cadogan, daughter of William Cadogan, 1st Earl Cadogan. They married on 4 December 1719 at The Hague, and had eight children including Charles Lennox, 3rd Duke of Richmond. It seems that the marriage of Richmond to Duchess Sarah was a success, not always the case among the Georgian aristocracy. The Duchess took a keen interest in all the Duke's doings including his cricket. Several references and letters written by her, including some financial accounts, have survived.

On Monday, 15 June, Slindon v Portsmouth at Stansted Park, near Chichester, is the earliest known match involving Slindon, though the club must have been playing for some time beforehand. Richmond, who sponsored Slindon, said in a letter that "above 5,000 people" were present. In a second letter, he gave the result, which was a win for Slindon by 9 wickets.

In a letter to her husband dated 9 July, Duchess Sarah mentioned a conversation with John Newland about a Slindon match against a team from East Dean at Long Down, near Eartham, a week earlier.

In two subsequent letters to the Duke of Newcastle, Richmond spoke about a game on 28 July which resulted in a brawl with "hearty blows" and "broken heads"! The game was at Portslade between Slindon and unnamed opponents. Apparently, Slindon won the battle, but the result of the match is unknown.

Slindon's first historically important match was played 7 September against Surrey on Merrow Down, Guildford. Before the game, Richmond sent a letter to his friend the Duke of Newcastle in which spoke of "poor little Slyndon (sic) against almost your whole county of Surrey". Next day he wrote again, saying that "wee (sic) have beat Surrey almost in one innings".

Duchess Sarah wrote to her husband on Wednesday, 9 September, and said she "wish'd..... that the Sussex mobb (sic) had thrash'd the Surrey mob". She had "a grudge to those fellows ever since they mob'd you" (apparently a reference to the Richmond Green fiasco in August 1731). She then said she wished the Duke "had won more of their moneys".

== Kent v London ==
Kent were to play London, 24 June on Chislehurst Common, but the match was rained off. Kent was said to be "eleven out of three parishes for the county". Expectations were high but the whole day was ruined by the rain. The date is deduced from a newspaper report on Thursday, 2 July, which says the match took place "yesterday se'ennight". "Se'ennight" was a common contemporary expression used for "a week ago (on)" or "a week (ahead) on"; therefore, as "yesterday" was Wednesday, 1 July, "se'ennight" was a week earlier on Wednesday, 24 June. The report pre-announced a return match, to be played 6 July on the Artillery Ground, but no post-match report has been found.

== London v Chislehurst ==
London hosted Chislehurst, 3 July on the Artillery Ground, and Chislehurst won by 60 runs. The match was described by the primary source as "one of the best matches that has been played these many years". Chislehurst's margin of victory, however, was substantial for the time.

== Single wicket ==
On Monday, 8 June, Five of London were to play Five of Richmond in the Artillery Ground for £20 a side. The result is unknown.

== Other events ==
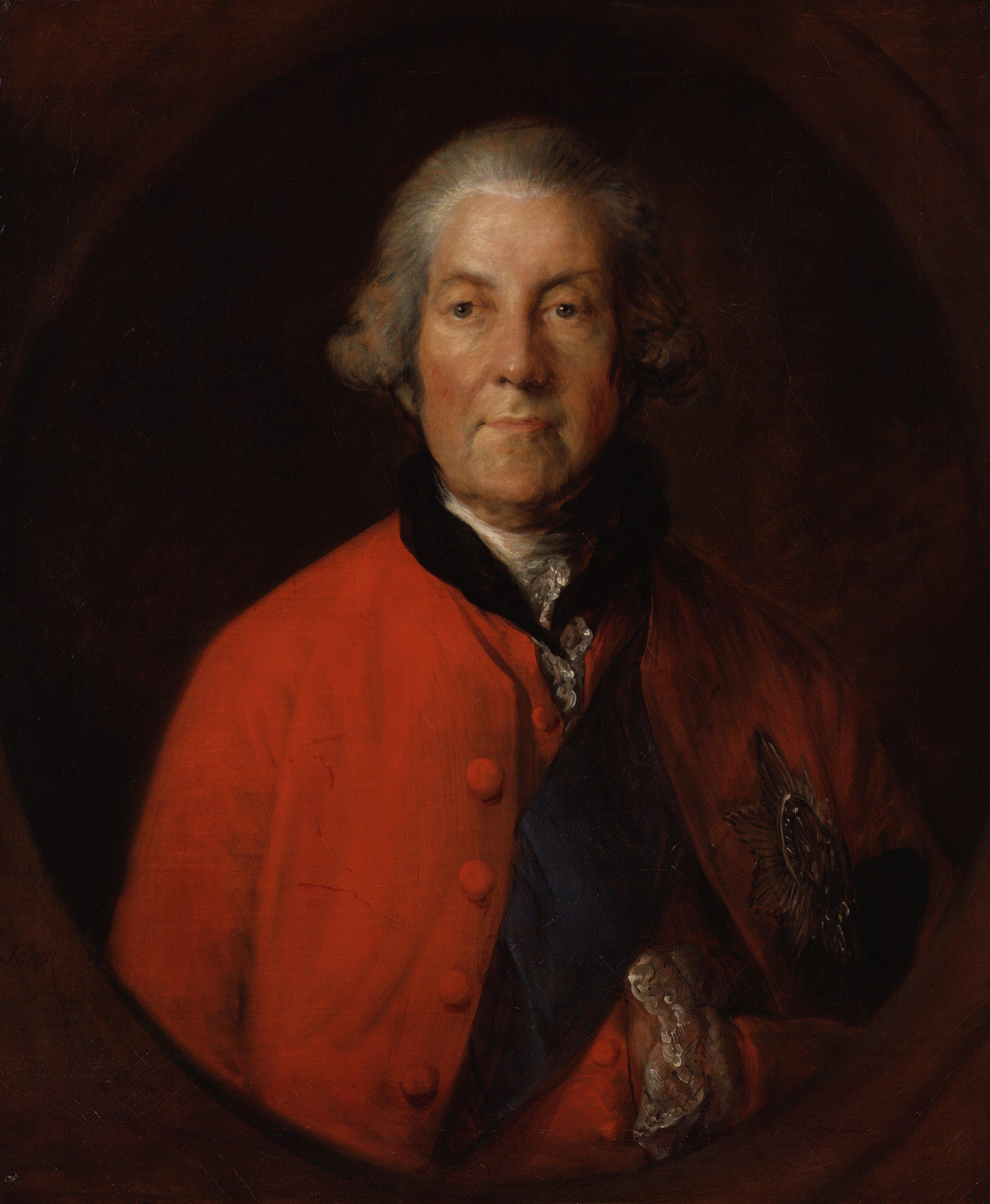
John Russell, 4th Duke of Bedford, painted c.1770 by Thomas Gainsborough. Bedford sponsored the early Bedfordshire team.

On 10 August, Bedfordshire played a Huntingdonshire & Northamptonshire combine at Woburn Park. This is the earliest known match in Bedfordshire, and the earliest mention of cricket in respect of all the three counties involved. It was hosted by John Russell, 4th Duke of Bedford, who captained Bedfordshire. Huntingdonshire & Northamptonshire included their patrons George Montagu-Dunk, 2nd Earl of Halifax (Northamptonshire) and John Montagu, 4th Earl of Sandwich (Huntingdonshire). Huntingdonshire & Northamptonshire won.

There was a return match, played 15 August on Cow Meadow, Northampton, which was also won by Huntingdonshire & Northamptonshire. This is the earliest known match in Northamptonshire. As a newspaper report put it, "the like success attended the two united Counties".

Three days later, Northamptonshire were due to play Buckinghamshire on Cow Meadow, but the result is unknown. The stakes were 20 guineas per side. Northamptonshire, as before, were led by the Earl of Halifax. Buckinghamshire's patron was Richard Grenville, who was then the MP for Buckingham; he later became the brother-in-law of William Pitt, 1st Earl of Chatham (Pitt the Elder). The match is the earliest known to have been played by each of the teams as a single county.

On an unknown date, there was a Buckinghamshire v Bedfordshire match at Wotton Underwood in Buckinghamshire that was reportedly attended by 6,000 people. The patrons were Grenville and Bedford. Buckinghamshire won, and it is the first match known to have taken place at a location which is still part of Buckinghamshire—the earliest record of cricket in the county was in 1730 at Datchet Common, now in Berkshire.

== First mentions ==
=== Counties ===
- Bedfordshire
- Huntingdonshire
- Northamptonshire

=== Clubs and teams ===
- Bedfordshire (18th century)
- Buckinghamshire (18th century)
- Huntingdonshire & Northamptonshire
- Northamptonshire (18th century)
- Portsmouth

=== Players ===
- John Russell, 4th Duke of Bedford (Bedfordshire)
- George Montagu-Dunk, 2nd Earl of Halifax (Northamptonshire)
- John Montagu, 4th Earl of Sandwich (Huntingdonshire)
- Richard Grenville (Buckinghamshire)

=== Venues ===
- Charlwood
- Cow Meadow, Northampton
- Stansted Park
- Woburn Park

== Bibliography ==
- ACS (1981). A Guide to Important Cricket Matches Played in the British Isles 1709–1863. Nottingham: ACS. OCLC 85045528.
- Bowen, Rowland (1970). Cricket: A History of its Growth and Development. London: Eyre & Spottiswoode. ISBN 978-04-13278-60-9.
- Buckley, G. B. (1935). Fresh Light on 18th Century Cricket. Birmingham: Cotterell & Co. OCLC 23450280.
- Marshall, John (1961). The Duke Who Was Cricket. London: Frederick Muller Ltd. OCLC 11214571.
- Maun, Ian (2009). From Commons to Lord's, Volume One: 1700 to 1750. Cambridge: Roger Heavens. ISBN 978-19-00592-52-9.
- McCann, Tim (2004). Sussex Cricket in the Eighteenth Century (PDF). Vol. 88. Lewes: West Sussex Record Office. ISBN 978-08-54450-55-8.
- Waghorn, H. T. (1899). Cricket Scores, Notes, &c. From 1730–1773. Edinburgh: Blackwood. OCLC 1086375331.
- Waghorn, H. T. (2005) [1906]. The Dawn of Cricket. London: J. W. McKenzie. ISBN 978-09-47821-17-3.
