= 1730 English cricket season =

Cricket season review

The most noticeable aspect of the 1730 English cricket season is the largest number of matches on record to date, with much more coverage in the newspapers than in all previous seasons. Significantly, the surviving reports show the growing importance of the sport in metropolitan London and its surrounding areas. The Artillery Ground entered the historical record for the first time while London Cricket Club established its prominence. The club's rivals tended to be county teams with Kent, Middlesex, Surrey, and Sussex all active. Details of twenty historically important matches are known. (Note: Any match listed in the ACS' Important Match Guide (1981) is historically important, and therefore of the highest standard, whether or not a scorecard might exist. The same applies to numerous matches discovered by researchers since 1981. For further information, see First-class cricket.)

== Richmond v Gage ==
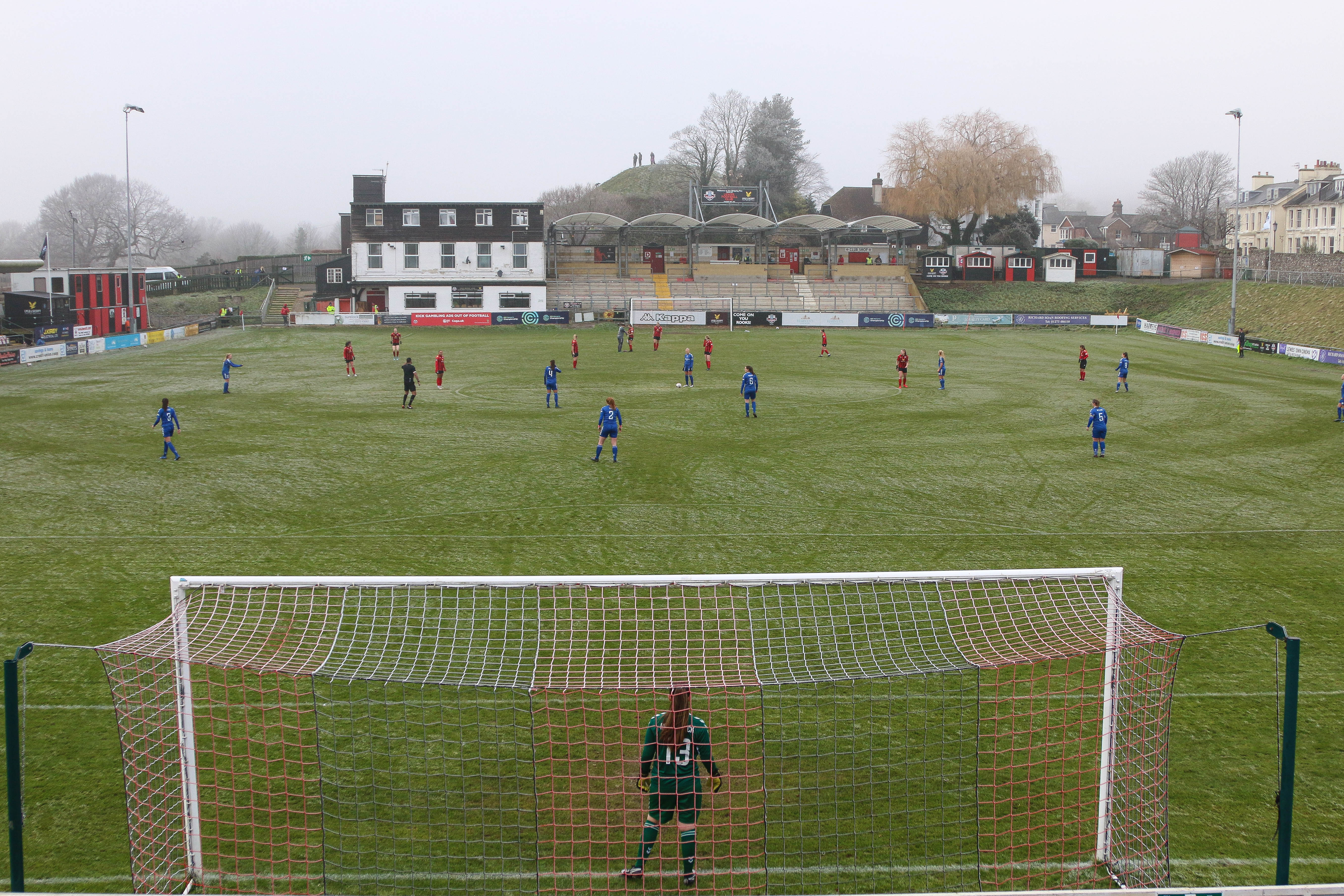
The Dripping Pan is still a sporting venue.

In Sussex, the cricketing rivalry between Charles Lennox, 2nd Duke of Richmond and Sir William Gage was set to continue and at least two matches were arranged. However, it is not certain if either were played and one was certainly "put off". In a letter written by one Henry Forster on 10 June, he says (sic): "Ye say in Chichester his grace [Richmond] is to play a cricket mach friday [12 June] with Sr Willm Gaige on Bery Hill". No other details have been found.

Richmond's XI and Gage's XI were due to play again 5 August at The Dripping Pan in Lewes, but the match "was put off on account of (Thomas) Waymark, the Duke's man, being ill". It is not clear if it was cancelled or postponed. A prize of 100 guineas was at stake. The Dripping Pan is a grassy-banked natural amphitheatre off Mountfield Road in Lewes; it is today the home of Lewes F.C.

== County cricket ==
In the sense of both teams being labelled with the names of counties, there were four "inter-county" matches, but 18th century nomenclature should never be taken literally as a team called, say, Sussex might mean nothing more than the fact that its patron lived in that county.

Surrey defeated Middlesex 2–4 July on Richmond Green, and Sussex 9 July on Merrow Down, Guildford—in both matches, the margin of victory is unknown. Surrey played Middlesex again on 10 August and this time Middlesex won. That match is the earliest known to have been played on the Artillery Ground, in Finsbury. (Note: Several 18th century reports mention the location of the Artillery Ground between Chiswell Street and Bunhill Fields, then in Finsbury. Owned by the Honourable Artillery Company, it was often referenced in contemporary reports as the "old" Artillery Ground, perhaps because it had long been used frequently for other forms of sport or entertainment. It was the feature venue for London cricket from 1730 until the 1760s, and was last used for an important match in 1778.) A third match was proposed as "the Surrey gentlemen are very desirous of saving their credit if possible". A provisional date of 17 August was set but there was no mention of a venue.

== Kent v London ==
Kent, under its patron Edwin Stead, seems to have been the strongest county team. The St James Evening Post on 8 August reported: "'Twas thought that the Kentish champions would have lost their honours by being beat at one innings if time had permitted". The match in question was played 5 August in Blackheath against London, whose team often opposed counties, and the wording of the report suggests that the result was cricket's earliest known draw. It is also the first time that a team was called the "champions", while "losing their honours" suggests the loss of a title, though no titles of any kind were officially recognised at the time.

The reference to 'innings' in the report is the earliest on record. The origin of the term is unknown.

In all, Kent played three matches against London. The first was on 2 July at a venue in the Gray's Inn area, and Kent won that by an unknown margin. The precise location was "a field near the lower end of Gray's Inn Lane, London". The newspaper reported "a cricket-match between the Kentish men and the Londoners for £50, and won by the former".

The second match was the probable draw on 5 August, and they played a third match 12 August at Frog Lane in Islington but, as the newspaper reported: "being obliged by their articles to leave off at seven o’clock, they could not finish it". London had a lead of 30 when play ended, and it was agreed to resume 18 August on Kennington Common, but the final result is unknown.

== Surrey v London ==
Surrey also played three matches against London. The first was played 17 August on Kennington Common, the others 31 August and 4 September on the Artillery Ground. London won the first two by margins of one run and six runs respectively; the result of the third match is unknown. A brief report of the match on Kennington Common says it was "thought to be one of the completest matches that ever was played". The stake on 31 August was 20 guineas.

== Single wicket ==
Reports of four single wicket matches have been found. Three of these appear to have been a series between Four of Kent and Four of Brentford. The first two were played for a stake of £50 and the third, perhaps a decider, "for a considerable wager". Edwin Stead captained Kent. The first match was played 28 May on Westerham Common, "articles being drawn to play or pay", and this was followed by a return on 4 June at Kew Green—neither result is known. The third match did not take place until 26 August on Walworth Common and Four of Brentford won it.

On 29 June, there was a "two threes" single wicket match for £50 at Mickleham Downs between Three of Surrey and Three of Sussex. A report in the London Evening Post says the players were "esteemed the best in the respective counties", but does not name them. The Sussex trio won.

== Other events ==
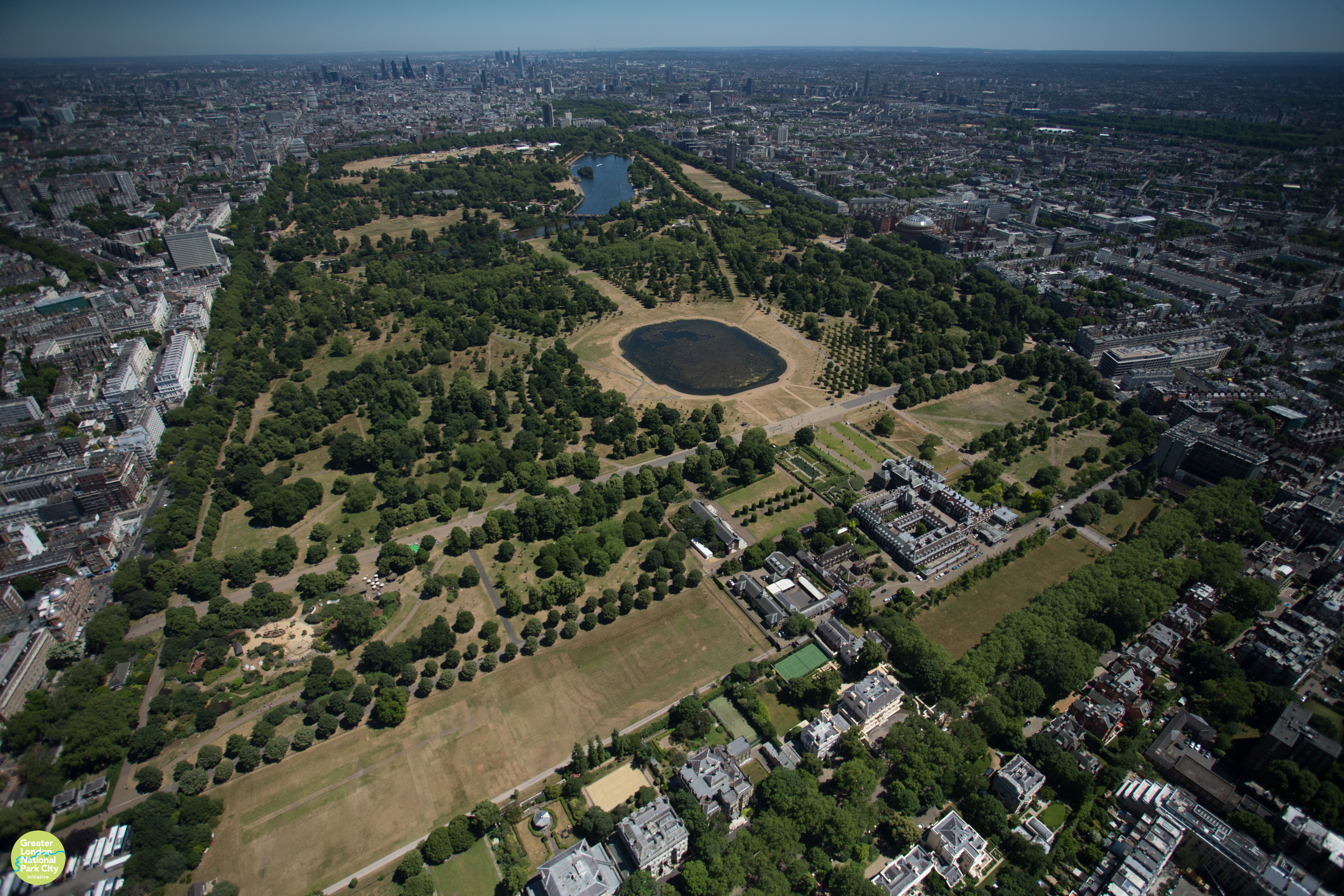
Hyde Park, where the Duke of Richmond played in 1730.

During April, there were reports in a number of journals about the 2nd Duke of Richmond and other members of the nobility playing cricket in Hyde Park. One such report on 7 April stated: "His Grace the Duke of Richmond, and several other young Noblemen and gentlemen, have begun to divert themselves each Morning at the Play of Cricket in Hide (sic) Park, and design to pursue that wholesome Exercise every fair Morning during the Spring". A report on 25 April anticipated a match for 100 guineas, but no further details have been found.

In July, Surrey's patron for their match against Sussex was a Mr Andrews. It is known that he was a resident of Sunbury-on-Thames.

Evidence of how cricket was gaining media coverage is apparent in reports of local matches on 9 and 13 July. The first, "for a guinea a man" was a single wicket match won by three players from Hawkhurst. The second was between a "gentlemen only" team and the so-called "Lumbar Troop"—the result is unknown.

On 23 July, Epsom played Sunbury on Epsom Down, but no details are known.

Greenwich Cricket Club played London in Blackheath on 31 July, but the stake was relatively low at 20 guineas and London may not have sent their strongest team.

A twelve-a-side game was played 17 August at Tonbridge and "backed by a great many of the noblemen and gentry of that place". It seems to have been a tight contest which was unfinished on the day, so another date was chosen for the conclusion, but nothing further is known.

On 9 September, there was a match on Putney Heath between Putney and Fulham for a stake of 50 guineas. Putney won by an unknown margin. It is the only known instance of a team called Putney and of a match at this venue, which is now part of Wimbledon Common.

A match played 2 October on Datchet Heath, near Windsor, is the first reference to cricket in the county of Buckinghamshire. (Datchet is now in Berkshire).

== First mentions ==
=== Counties ===
- Buckinghamshire

=== Clubs and teams ===
- Brentford
- Epsom
- Fulham
- Greenwich
- Middlesex
- Putney
- Sunbury

=== Players ===
- Mr Andrews (Sunbury and Surrey)

=== Venues ===
- Blackheath (unspecified)
- Datchet Heath, near Windsor
- The Dripping Pan, Lewes
- Epsom Down
- Frog Lane, Islington
- Gray's Inn Lane, London
- Kew Green
- Merrow Down, Guildford
- Mickleham Downs
- Putney Heath
- Tonbridge (unspecified)
- Westerham Common

== Bibliography ==
- ACS (1981). A Guide to Important Cricket Matches Played in the British Isles 1709–1863. Nottingham: ACS. OCLC 85045528.
- Ashley-Cooper, F. S. (1929). Kent Cricket Matches, 1719–1880. Canterbury: Gibbs & Sons. OCLC 220674085.
- Buckley, G. B. (1935). Fresh Light on 18th Century Cricket. Birmingham: Cotterell & Co. OCLC 23450280.
- Buckley, G. B. (1937). Fresh Light on pre-Victorian Cricket. Birmingham: Cotterell & Co. OCLC 23469107.
- Maun, Ian (2009). From Commons to Lord's, Volume One: 1700 to 1750. Cambridge: Roger Heavens. ISBN 978-19-00592-52-9.
- McCann, Tim (2004). Sussex Cricket in the Eighteenth Century (PDF). Vol. 88. Lewes: West Sussex Record Office. ISBN 978-08-54450-55-8.
- Waghorn, H. T. (1899). Cricket Scores, Notes, &c. From 1730–1773. Edinburgh: Blackwood. OCLC 1086375331.
- Webber, Roy (1960). The Phoenix History of Cricket. Charing Cross, London: Phoenix House Ltd. OCLC 5391059.
- Wilson, Martin (2005). An Index to Waghorn. London: Bodyline Books (limited edition, by subscription only).
