= 1755 English cricket season =

Cricket season review

Details have survived of five eleven-a-side matches in the 1755 English cricket season, and two notable single wicket matches. They are all historically important. (Note: Any match listed in the ACS' Important Match Guide (1981) is historically important, and therefore of the highest standard, whether or not a scorecard might exist. The same applies to numerous matches discovered by researchers since 1981. For further information, see First-class cricket.)

The season's biggest match was London against the Middlesex & Surrey combine on the Artillery Ground. A Cambridge University team played two matches against an Eton College XI. It is unlikely that the modern Cambridge University Cricket Club had been founded at this early stage.

== Eleven-a-side matches ==
On 3 and 5 June, a team from the University of Cambridge played an Eton College XI in two matches at an unknown venue in Cambridge. Cambridge University won both times.

Cricket at the University of Cambridge had first been mentioned in 1710, and it was not until the early 19th century that Cambridge University Cricket Club was founded. These two matches are the earliest known to have been played by a team representing the university. It is not clear if the Eton team was past or present pupils or both. From a comment made by the Public Advertiser, it is possible that the teams had previously met in 1754, and that Eton won.

On 10 July, Hampton played against Kingston on Hampton Court Green, and Hampton won by 3 wickets. Kingston scored 95 and 50; Hampton scored 72 and 65/7. Play was delayed for an hour by rain after Hampton's first innings ended. Odds were "a guinea to a crown on the Kingston team and at last as much on the Court team".

London played against Waltham, 21 July, on the Artillery Ground. The game was pre-announced by the Daily Advertiser on Saturday, 19 July, but the result is unknown.

London met the Middlesex & Surrey combine, 8 August, on the Artillery Ground. The match was described as "so long depending", which suggests it may have been postponed. Tom Faulkner, Joe Harris, and John Frame all played for London as given men. London won by 20 runs.

== Single wicket ==
Two single wicket matches were recorded. The first, on Thursday, 26 June, was a "fives" match on Kennington Common in which London defeated Eton & Windsor by 8 runs. London scored 13 and 22; Eton & Windsor scored 11 and 16. London's team was Perry, Little and Tall Bennett, John Capon, and Clowder. This is the only known mention of Clowder in sources.

On Monday, 28 July, Joe Harris and another London player were matched against two Surrey players at the Artillery Ground. The result is unknown.

== Other events ==
The Daily Advertiser announced on Thursday, 12 June that on Monday next, 16 June, a match would be played on Datchet Common for a considerable sum of money.

On Thursday, 28 August, there was an horrific incident in which a player had his right eye "knocked out by a ball". The game was on Kennington Common, but no other information was reported.

== First mentions ==
=== Clubs and teams ===
- Eton & Windsor
- Waltham

=== Players ===
- Clowder (London)

=== Venues ===
- Cambridge (unspecified)
- Hampton Court Green

== Bibliography ==
- ACS (1981). A Guide to Important Cricket Matches Played in the British Isles 1709–1863. Nottingham: ACS. OCLC 85045528.
- Buckley, G. B. (1935). Fresh Light on 18th Century Cricket. Birmingham: Cotterell & Co. OCLC 23450280.
- Buckley, G. B. (1937). Fresh Light on pre-Victorian Cricket. Birmingham: Cotterell & Co. OCLC 23469107.
- Maun, Ian (2011). From Commons to Lord's, Volume Two: 1751 to 1770. Leicester: Martin Wilson. ISBN 978-09-56906-60-1.
- Waghorn, H. T. (2005) [1906]. The Dawn of Cricket. London: J. W. McKenzie. ISBN 978-09-47821-17-3.
