= 1742 English cricket season =

Cricket season review

The highlights of the 1742 English cricket season were the two famous London versus Slindon matches in September. There was another match involving a team called England, and the word "cricketer" was used for the first time.

Details of ten historically important matches are known. (Note: Any match listed in the ACS' Important Match Guide (1981) is historically important, and therefore of the highest standard, whether or not a scorecard might exist. The same applies to numerous matches discovered by researchers since 1981. For further information, see First-class cricket.)

== London v Slindon ==
In September, London and Slindon played two matches on the Artillery Ground. There has been confusion about the dates, and the margin of London's victory in the second match, due to one source's misinterpretation of ambiguous reports in the London Evening Post dated 9 to 11 September. Elsewhere, the references to the second match confirm that 6th and 10th are the correct dates for the two matches. The Daily Advertiser of Saturday, 11 September 1742, reports the margin in the second match as 184 notches and says it was played yesterday. According to Maun's source, the game was due to commence on Wednesday, 8 September, "but was postponed (to the 10th) on account of rain".

Ashley-Cooper said of the first game on the 6th that "London won with great difficulty". A contemporary report said Slindon came into the match having "played forty-three games and lost but one". Several wagers were laid that one Slindon batter—almost certainly Richard Newland—would obtain forty runs off his own bat, a feat he failed to achieve.

On the 10th, London won the postponed return match by 184 runs. Slindon offered to play a third match against London, either at Guildford or on the South Downs for £100, but the challenge wasn't accepted.

== Surrey v England ==
Surrey met and defeated a multi-county team, 23 August on Moulsey Hurst. Although later sources have called Surrey's opponents England, the original notice described them as "London, Westminster, Middlesex, Southwark and Part of Kent". Ashley-Cooper mentioned that the Moulsey Hurst ground was in 1900 held by the Hurst Park Racing Club.

== London v Bromley ==
Following the tied match between London and Surrey in 1741, there was another when London met Bromley, 14 June 1742, on the Artillery Ground. Waghorn's source remarked that the game "gave so much satisfaction to the spectators". The teams arranged a rematch on 9 August, also on the Artillery Ground. This was to be "played for a considerable sum", but the result is unknown.

In 1900, Cricket: A Weekly Record of the Game presented a series of 18th century cricket notices, collated by F. S. Ashley-Cooper, as part of his regular At the Sign of the Wicket feature. The series ran through six issues (nos 530–535) from 25 January to 26 April 1900. The London v Bromley tie was the first match notice in the series, which covered the ten seasons from 1742 to 1851. The last notice was about a single wicket event on 26 August 1751.

== Matches with unknown results ==
In addition to the August match against Bromley, London arranged five others which were pre-announced but have no known outcomes. The first was scheduled for 7 July, against Richmond on the Artillery Ground. A "considerable sum" was at stake. The same situation applied to a match against Croydon on 26 July.

On 2 August, London were due to play a combined Kent, Surrey & Sussex at Duppas Hill, Croydon. The pre-match notice describes the counties team as "the Gentlemen of Kent and Surry and the Sussex Man from Slending (Slindon)". It is possible, but by no means certain, that Richard Newland was the given man. A large sum of money was at stake, and the announcement says "the booths (retail) are to be set back and the ground to be roped round (i.e., forming a boundary)".

Croydon were due to play London a second time, 16 August, again on the Artillery Ground. It is known that two Kent players and "the noted bowler from Slendon (sic)" were to assist Croydon; while two Surrey players were given men to London. The "noted Slindon bowler" may have been Edward Aburrow Sr.

The last of these matches was London v Surrey, due 2 September on the Artillery Ground. A Kent player from Bromley (possibly Robert Colchin) was to be a given man for London. This match was originally scheduled for 6 September. It was rearranged because of the visit of Slindon to London on the 6th.

== Other events ==
A schoolteacher in New Romney made the earliest known use of the word "cricketer" when completing a diary entry. He bestowed the accolade upon one William Pullen of Cranbrook, but it was in connection with Pullen's death. He had just been hanged, on Penenden Heath near Maidstone, for stealing a sheep and five bushels of wheat.

On Thursday, 27 May, the poet Thomas Gray (1716–1771) wrote a letter to a Mr Richard West and said: "There is my Lords ** and ***, they are Statesmen; Do not you remember them dirty boys playing at cricket"? The two "noble lords" are believed to have been John Russell, 4th Duke of Bedford and John Montagu, 4th Earl of Sandwich.

== First mentions ==
=== Clubs and teams ===
- Bromley
- Kent, Surrey & Sussex

== Bibliography ==
- ACS (1981). A Guide to Important Cricket Matches Played in the British Isles 1709–1863. Nottingham: ACS. OCLC 85045528.
- Maun, Ian (2009). From Commons to Lord's, Volume One: 1700 to 1750. Cambridge: Roger Heavens. ISBN 978-19-00592-52-9.
- McCann, Tim (2004). Sussex Cricket in the Eighteenth Century (PDF). Vol. 88. Lewes: West Sussex Record Office. ISBN 978-08-54450-55-8.
- Waghorn, H. T. (1899). Cricket Scores, Notes, &c. From 1730–1773. Edinburgh: Blackwood. OCLC 1086375331.
- Waghorn, H. T. (2005) [1906]. The Dawn of Cricket. London: J. W. McKenzie. ISBN 978-09-47821-17-3.
- Wilson, Martin (2005). An Index to Waghorn. London: Bodyline Books (limited edition, by subscription only).
