= 1736 English cricket season =

Cricket season review

The earliest known instance of a tie happened in the 1736 English cricket season. The occasion was a three-a-side single wicket match between London and Surrey on Lamb's Conduit Field in Holborn. The season is also notable for the first appearances in sources of Chertsey Cricket Club and its Laleham Burway ground. Details of twenty historically important matches are known. (Note: Any match listed in the ACS' Important Match Guide (1981) is historically important, and therefore of the highest standard, whether or not a scorecard might exist. The same applies to numerous matches discovered by researchers since 1981. For further information, see First-class cricket.)

== Kent v Surrey ==
Kent and Surrey met twice at the latter end of the season. The first match was played 20 September on Kennington Common. Kent scored 41 and 53; Surrey replied with 71 and 24/8 to win by 2 wickets. During the match, an incident occurred in the crowd. Three soldiers apprehended a deserter but the crowd turned on them, rescued the deserter, and "after a severe discipline let them go about their business".

The teams met again 4 October on Coxheath Common. First innings scores were level when it began to rain, though Kent still had five wickets in hand. No further play was possible, and the match ended in a draw.

== Middlesex v Surrey ==
Middlesex and Surrey played each other four times between 16 August and 22 September. Middlesex won the first match on Chelsea Common by 9 runs. It was played for 50 guineas a side as reported in the General Evening Post on Tuesday, 17 August. They met again, 21 August, on Moulsey Hurst where Surrey won by 5 runs. The source says "there were about £100 to £60 for the (sic) Middlesex".

Middlesex and Surrey played their third match 11 September, again on Moulsey Hurst, for 50 guineas a side, and Surrey won by 2 runs. The fourth match, due to be played 22 September on Lamb's Conduit Field, was announced the previous day in the London Evening Post, but there was no post-match report.

== London v Surrey ==
London and Surrey met three times. The first on 14 July was at the Artillery Ground. A report in the General Evening Post next day says: "London beat Surrey by 30 notches and had three men to go in". This is confusing but it may mean there was a declaration of sorts in the second innings. They met again 11 August on Barnes Common. A report in the Whitehall Evening Post on Saturday, 14 August refers to Surrey as "Barnes, Fulham and Richmond". It goes on to say that the next match on Tuesday, 17 August would be played "in the fields behind Powis House", meaning Lamb's Conduit Field in Holborn. It extends the hope that "the company will keep a good ring which was very much wanted at Barnes Common". Surrey won by 19 runs.

After the third match, the Daily Gazetteer on Wednesday, 18 August stated that London beat Surrey by "upwards of 90 notches". The Whitehall Evening Post next day gave the scores, and repeated the report of the previous match by first referring to Surrey as "Barnes, Fulham and Richmond"; but it then talked about "the Surrey men". London scored 55 and 75; Surrey scored 31 and 13 so that London won the game by 86 runs. Two London batsmen in the second innings had a partnership of 51, which was a considerable achievement at the time, given the usual poor pitch conditions.

== London v Mitcham ==
London and Mitcham played each other three times on Kennington Common. The first was on 13 May, but the result is unknown. In the second match on 22 June, London won by an unknown margin. The result of the third match on 2 September is unknown.

== Chertsey v Croydon ==
There were three matches between Surrey clubs Chertsey and Croydon. Knowledge of them is from an announcement in Read's Weekly Journal dated Saturday, 3 July, about a deciding game on Richmond Green to be played on Monday, 5 July. In each of the first two matches, the home team won "by a great number of runs". The first was at Duppas Hill, in Croydon. The second match, at Laleham Burway, is the first important one known to have been played there.

The third match was played 5 July on Richmond Green for £50. Chertsey scored 88 and 55; Croydon replied with 58 and 25/9. Croydon with one wicket standing still needed 61 runs to win when the clock struck eight, and the game was drawn.

== London v Chertsey ==
The teams met 19 July at Laleham Burway, and 29 July at the Artillery Ground. A newspaper report of the first match says very large bets were laid on what became a "hard match", which London won "by a very few notches". The Chertsey team was the same eleven as played against Croydon at Richmond Green on 5 July. In the second match, London scored 48 and 60; Chertsey made 97 and 12/2 to win by 8 wickets.

== Single wicket ==
A match was played Thursday, 24 June on Kennington Common in which London's Wakeland, the distiller, and George Oldner played together against two "famous" Richmond players who were "esteemed the best two in England". Unfortunately, the esteemed pair are not named, though one of them suffered serious facial injuries in the game when the ball came off his bat and hit his nose. The report rails against "human brutes" who insisted he should play on despite his injuries.

On Wednesday, 1 September, a "threes" match on Lamb's Conduit Field, in Holborn, between London and Surrey ended in cricket's earliest known tie. Different versions of the scores have been reported, but the teams totalled 23 runs each in their two completed innings. In one version, London scored 4 and 19 against Surrey's 18 and 5; in the other, London scored 5 and 18 against Surrey's 17 and 6.

== Other events ==
On 9 July, London played against Streatham Cricket Club on White Lion Fields in Streatham, but the result is unknown. This is the only reference to a Streatham team in surviving sources.

== First mentions ==
=== Clubs and teams ===
- Chertsey
- Streatham Cricket Club

=== Players ===
- George Oldner

=== Venues ===
- Barnes Common
- Laleham Burway
- White Lion Fields, Streatham

== Bibliography ==
- ACS (1981). A Guide to Important Cricket Matches Played in the British Isles 1709–1863. Nottingham: ACS. OCLC 85045528.
- Bowen, Rowland (1970). Cricket: A History of its Growth and Development. London: Eyre & Spottiswoode. ISBN 978-04-13278-60-9.
- Buckley, G. B. (1935). Fresh Light on 18th Century Cricket. Birmingham: Cotterell & Co. OCLC 23450280.
- Maun, Ian (2009). From Commons to Lord's, Volume One: 1700 to 1750. Cambridge: Roger Heavens. ISBN 978-19-00592-52-9.
- Waghorn, H. T. (1899). Cricket Scores, Notes, &c. From 1730–1773. Edinburgh: Blackwood. OCLC 1086375331.
