= 1732 English cricket season =

Cricket season review

In the 1732 English cricket season, a total of twelve historically important matches are known to have been arranged, though they may not all have been played. (Note: Any match listed in the ACS' Important Match Guide (1981) is historically important, and therefore of the highest standard, whether or not a scorecard might exist. The same applies to numerous matches discovered by researchers since 1981. For further information, see First-class cricket.) Most of the matches involved London Cricket Club, who sometimes played against county teams. In August, the Whitehall Evening Post reported that the Prince of Wales attended "a great cricket match" at Kew on 27 July.

The London club continued to predominate and it was said that its team did not lose a game, although a team called London did lose to Croydon in May. The Artillery Ground came into more frequent use and its keeper, Christopher Jones, was mentioned in one newspaper report.

Cricket at this time was still played with two stumps and a bat shaped like a modern hockey stick, which was the ideal implement for dealing with a ball being bowled along the ground, as in bowls. There was still no indication of the major rule changes that transformed the sport into its modern guise.

== Croydon v London ==
The first match in the records was played on 8 May (a Monday) between Croydon and London on Walworth Common. A newspaper reported that Croydon won "by great odds". However, at the end of the season, another report said:

This is the thirteenth match the London gamesters have played this year and not lost one match.

Despite the contradictory statement in the second report, there is sufficient evidence that London did lose to Croydon in May.

== London v Surrey ==
London played three matches (possibly four) against Surrey. One result is unknown, one match was drawn, and London won one. Their first meeting was at the Artillery Ground on 7 June, and London won by eight runs. Researcher G. B. Buckley found two reports in the St James Evening Post. The first, a pre-match notice on 6 June, said that "a very great sum of money" was at stake, that the ground would be staked, and "all gentlemen are desired to keep outside the rope". The second report on 8 June simply reported that "London won by 8 notches [i.e., runs]".

The teams met again on 26 June at Sanderstead Downs, near Croydon. A post-match report said, somewhat ambiguously, that "the London gamesters got 77 ahead the last hands [i.e., innings] and but 4 men out, time not permitting them to play it out", which means the match was drawn.

The third match began at the Artillery Ground on 29 August, but it was unfinished at seven o'clock, and a report said "(they) are to play it again on Monday, 11 September". It is not known if the replay ever took place.

== London v Middlesex ==
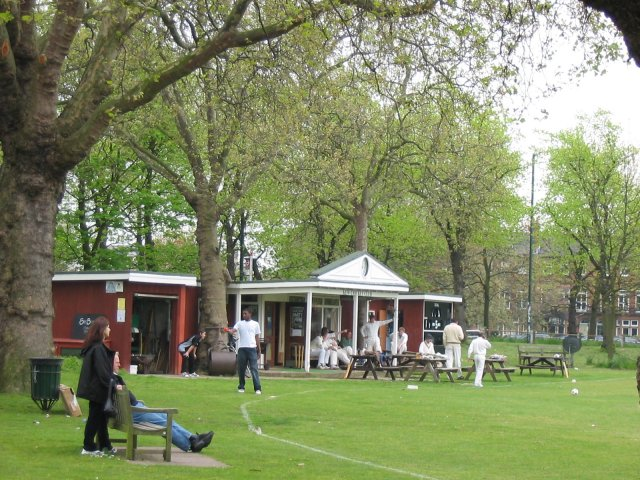
Cricket pavilion on Kew Green today.

London also played three matches against Middlesex. The first was scheduled for 7 August, a pre-match notice stating that the venue would be "the field behind the Woolpack at Islington". If it was played, the result is unknown.

The other two matches, on 4 and 13 September, are known from the pre-match notice for the second which said: ".... (those players involved on Wednesday, 13 September) will be the same persons that played Monday, 4 Sept., at Kew Green". The result of that match is unknown.

On 13 September, the teams met at the Artillery Ground, and the result was a draw. The circumstances were controversial, as the report states:

Middlesex went in first and got 88 notches; the Londoners got 84; the County went in again and got 58; the Londoners then went in for 63 notches to win; they got 56 and but four men out, when one of the County men would not play any longer, pretending the time was expired as they were to play to, which was six o'clock, although there wanted six minutes of the time by the scorer's watch. The London gamesters intend to go to law for the money, there being upward of £100 depending on the game. This is the thirteenth match the London gamesters have played this year and not lost one match.

As mentioned earlier, the last sentence is contradicted by the evidence of the match on 8 May, which London lost to Croydon.

== Other events ==
=== Christopher Jones ===
There is a reference in The Craftsman dated Saturday, 26 February to Mr Christopher Jones, Master of the Artillery Ground, at the "Pied Horse" in Chiswell Street (which abounded the ground).

=== 5 and 12 June ===
Confusion surrounds two matches which London reportedly played on Monday, 5 June, and Monday, 12 June. In the first, a London team apparently met a combined Brentford & Sunbury team on Walworth Common, and won "by very considerable odds". However, F. S. Ashley-Cooper says London played Kent at Dartford Brent on 5 June, with the result unrecorded. Although G. B. Buckley had included the Brentford & Sunbury game against London on the 5th, he later quoted The Craftsman saying that the match was "the whole County of Kent against the City of London and Bills of Mortality, to be played on Walworth Common".

According to the Dartford Cricket Club website in December 2005, the Kent v London game took place on the 12th. The site quoted a report in the Whitehall Evening Post, dated 18 June: "Kent lost to London on the Brent after 6/4 being laid against London in the middle of the game".

=== London v Essex & Hertfordshire ===
There was a match in Epping Forest on 6 July in which London played a combined Essex & Hertfordshire team. It is the earliest known reference to Essex as, in part at least, a county team. The terms were "for £50 a side, play or pay; wickets to be pitched at one o’clock precisely or forfeit half the money". The match is also the earliest recorded mention of cricket in connection with the county of Hertfordshire.

=== Kew Green ===
The Whitehall Evening Post reported on Thursday, 3 August that there was a "great cricket match" at Kew Green on Thursday, 27 July, attended by the Prince of Wales. Neither the team names nor the result were recorded.

== First mentions ==
=== Counties ===
- Hertfordshire

=== Clubs and teams ===
- Brentford & Sunbury
- Essex
- Essex & Hertfordshire
- Hertfordshire

=== Players ===
- Christopher Jones (Artillery Ground keeper)

=== Venues ===
- Epping Forest

== Bibliography ==
- ACS (1981). A Guide to Important Cricket Matches Played in the British Isles 1709–1863. Nottingham: ACS. OCLC 85045528.
- Ashley-Cooper, F. S. (1929). Kent Cricket Matches, 1719–1880. Canterbury: Gibbs & Sons. OCLC 220674085.
- Buckley, G. B. (1935). Fresh Light on 18th Century Cricket. Birmingham: Cotterell & Co. OCLC 23450280.
- Buckley, G. B. (1937). Fresh Light on pre-Victorian Cricket. Birmingham: Cotterell & Co. OCLC 23469107.
- Maun, Ian (2009). From Commons to Lord's, Volume One: 1700 to 1750. Cambridge: Roger Heavens. ISBN 978-19-00592-52-9.
- Waghorn, H. T. (2005) [1906]. The Dawn of Cricket. London: J. W. McKenzie. ISBN 978-09-47821-17-3.
