= 1770 English cricket season =

Cricket season review

Hambledon continued to be successful in the 1770 English cricket season, but only four historically important eleven-a-side matches are in the records. (Note: Any match listed in the ACS' Important Match Guide (1981) is historically important, and therefore of the highest standard, whether or not a scorecard might exist. The same applies to numerous matches discovered by researchers since 1981. For further information, see First-class cricket.)

== Matches ==
On Thursday, 7 June, the Whitehall Evening Post said that a match had been played two days earlier on Richmond Green, but did not report the result. The teams were Essex and a combined Brentford & Richmond team.

The combined London & Middlesex were to play Surrey, 20 & 21 August, on the Artillery Ground. No result or other details are known. The same applies to a Chertsey v Hampton scheduled for 11 September on Moulsey Hurst.

Hambledon again played Caterham, but somewhat late in the year: 4 & 5 October on Broadhalfpenny Down. Hambledon won by 57 runs, having scored 104 and 105 against Caterham's 74 and 78. No other details are known. The scores were recorded by Sussex lawyer John Baker, who was a spectator, in his diary.

== Other events ==
The Middlesex Journal on Thursday, 28 June, reported the death two days previously of a Mr Johnson, who was a goldsmith at London Wall. His death was 'occasioned by a blow which he received from a cricket ball on Thursday, 21 June near Islington'.

There was a notice in the General Evening Post dated Tuesday, 7 August, that 'His Majesty (George III) has given a silver cup to be played for at cricket on the 20th inst. on Richmond Green, on account of the Princes having been much pleased with a Cricket match there on Mon. last'. No details of either match have been found.

In the year of the so-called 'Boston Massacre', which occurred on Monday, 5 March, there was a report in the Middlesex Journal on Thursday, 16 August, that: 'about three days before the meeting of Parliament, a grand Cricket Match will be played by 11 of the Ministry against 11 of the Patriots, when great sport is expected'.

== First mentions ==
=== Clubs and teams ===
- Brentford & Richmond

== Bibliography ==
- ACS (1981). A Guide to Important Cricket Matches Played in the British Isles 1709–1863. Nottingham: ACS. OCLC 85045528.
- Buckley, G. B. (1935). Fresh Light on 18th Century Cricket. Birmingham: Cotterell & Co. OCLC 23450280.
- Buckley, G. B. (1937). Fresh Light on pre-Victorian Cricket. Birmingham: Cotterell & Co. OCLC 23469107.
- Maun, Ian (2011). From Commons to Lord's, Volume Two: 1751 to 1770. Leicester: Martin Wilson. ISBN 978-09-56906-60-1.
