= 1753 English cricket season =

Cricket season review

The first mentions of Hambledon and Broadhalfpenny Down are found in the 1753 English cricket season. Only five historically important matches, including one significant single wicket event, are on record. (Note: Any match listed in the ACS' Important Match Guide (1981) is historically important, and therefore of the highest standard, whether or not a scorecard might exist. The same applies to numerous matches discovered by researchers since 1981. For further information, see First-class cricket.)

The season may be said to mark the beginning of the so-called "Hambledon Era". The Hambledon team made its first recorded appearance in a match against Surrey. Hambledon was then probably run by a parish organisation, rather than by the famous club itself, which is believed to have been formed in the 1760s. There was a second nod to the future when London Cricket Club played against Marylebone, a team which had no connection with MCC (founded in 1787).

== Hambledon v Surrey ==
There was a match on 7 & 8 August in Hambledon hosted Surrey. The Hambledon Club per se probably didn't exist at this time. Its foundation is generally believed to have been in the 1760s, so the team in 1753 must have been either a parish eleven or a Hampshire county team. The latter option arises because the team wasn't limited to local players. John Lucas, of Portsmouth, scored 82 in Hambledon's first innings. Following Richard Newland's 88 in 1745, Lucas' innings is the second-highest known score by any batsman before 1769. Hambledon scored 202 and 105; Surrey scored 131 and 63. Hambledon won by 113 runs. The match was played on Broadhalfpenny Down, its first mention in connection with cricket.

== Single wicket ==
Monday, 10 September. Two of London were to play Tom Faulkner and Joe Harris for £20 at the Artillery Ground.

== Other events ==
- On 6 & 7 August, Dover hosted Dartford and won by 7 runs. Dover scored 57 and 83; Dartford scored 95 and 38.
- A benefit match was staged 15 August on the Artillery Ground for a Mr Anderson of the Dial in Long Alley, Moorfields. The teams were unnamed and no result has been recorded. There was a well-known player called William Anderson, first mentioned in 1745, so possibly this was he. The two elevens were made up of various players from the general London area with "the best bowlers to be parted".
- On 30 August, London played Marylebone (no connection with Marylebone Cricket Club). This was on the Artillery Ground, but the result is unknown. Marylebone had Tall Bennett and William King as given men.
- A poem, dedicated to the 1st Duke of Dorset, refers to a crimson cricket ball. It may have been made by Mr Clout, first noted in 1743, whose firm was in Sevenoaks where the Dukes of Dorset reside at Knole House. Clout was "the first cricket ball maker of any pretension". The better-known equipment manufacturing firm of Dukes was founded 1760 in Penshurst.

== First mentions ==
=== Clubs and teams ===
- Dover
- Hambledon (probably not the Hambledon Club per se)
- Marylebone (not MCC)

=== Players ===
- William King (London)
- John Lucas (Hambledon)

=== Venues ===
- Broadhalfpenny Down
- Dover (unspecified)

== Bibliography ==
- ACS (1981). A Guide to Important Cricket Matches Played in the British Isles 1709–1863. Nottingham: ACS. OCLC 85045528.
- Buckley, G. B. (1935). Fresh Light on 18th Century Cricket. Birmingham: Cotterell & Co. OCLC 23450280.
- Maun, Ian (2011). From Commons to Lord's, Volume Two: 1751 to 1770. Leicester: Martin Wilson. ISBN 978-09-56906-60-1.
