= Great City Race =

The Great City Race is an annual road running event over 5 km which takes place in July in the City of London and London Borough of Islington. The race starts and ends at the Artillery Ground.
