= Lamb's Conduit Field =

Defunct cricket grounds in London

Coordinates: 51°31′26″N 0°7′11″W

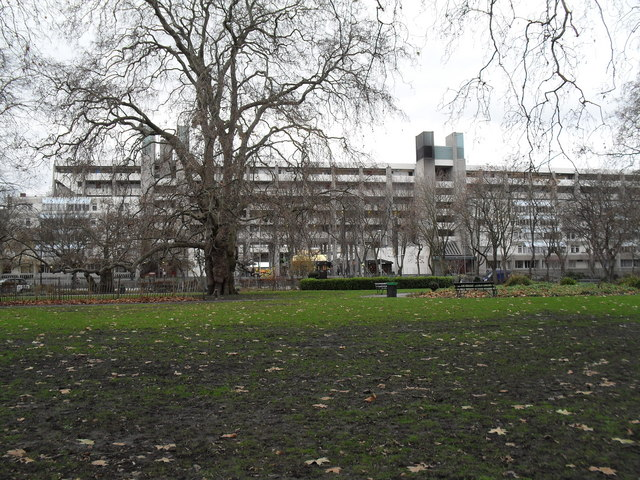

Lamb's Conduit Field, also known as Lamb's Conduit Fields, was an open area in what is now the London Borough of Camden. The fields lay north of the Lamb's Conduit water feature that gave it its name, and lay mostly in the parish of St Pancras. It was a noted cricket venue in the first half of the 18th century.

== Location ==
Its location was partly that now called Coram's Fields. Coram's Field is situated on the former site of the Foundling Hospital, established by Thomas Coram in what was then named Lamb's Conduit Field in 1739. It is not to be confused with White Conduit Fields, in Islington, which was another venue of 18th century cricket. It is believed that Lamb's Conduit Field ceased to be a cricket venue when construction of the Foundling Hospital was approved in or before 1739.

== Cricket venue ==
Lamb's Conduit Field
- Interactive map of Lamb's Conduit Field
- Location: St Pancras, London
- Home club: London Cricket Club
- County club: Middlesex
- Establishment: by 1707 season
- Last used: 1736 English cricket season

Lamb's Conduit Field is known to have been used for matches from 1707. The first match known to have been played there was in June 1707 when London met Mitcham Cricket Club.

There is a gap of over twenty years before the venue recurs in the cricket records. It was used in 1731 for when London played against an Enfield team and was then used twice in 1736 for London v Surrey and Middlesex v Surrey. By this time, the London club was using the Artillery Ground as its primary venue and the construction of the Foundling Hospital probably ended its interest in Lamb's Conduit Field.
