= Brentford Cricket Club =

Historical English cricket team

Representing Brentford, now in Greater London and then in Middlesex, the original Brentford Cricket Club was prominent in the 18th century, taking part in matches from 1730 to 1799. According to surviving records, it had no specific venue and is known to have played at Brentford Court Green, Kew Green, Richmond Green and Walworth Common. Brentford teams are recorded, either individually or jointly with other clubs, in at least twelve matches.

== Matches ==
The earliest known mention of Brentford as a cricket club is a series of three four-a-side single wicket matches in 1730 when Brentford played Edwin Stead's Kent and apparently won.

The first mention of Brentford in an eleven-a-side match is when they played Hampton Cricket Club at Moulsey Hurst on Wednesday, 14 July 1731. The result is unknown but a contemporary newspaper announcement, published a day earlier, states that "above £500 is already laid on their heads, neither side having ever yet been beat". In 1732, a combined Brentford and Sunbury team lost to London Cricket Club on Walworth Common.

There is then a long gap in the sources until a five-a-side single wicket match against Richmond in 1767. The result is unknown. A combined Brentford and Richmond team played Essex in an eleven-a-side match in June 1770. This was on Richmond Green and the result is unknown. In July 1771, there were two matches involving a combined Richmond, Hampton and Brentford team against Chertsey, one of England's strongest clubs at the time. These were played at Laleham Burway and Richmond Green. The results are unknown.

In August 1776, there was a match at the Artillery Ground between London and Brentford. The result is unknown but it was one of the last few significant matches both at the Artillery Ground and involving the original London club, the sport's focus having shifted from London to Hambledon. The final known mentions of Brentford's Georgian club occur in June 1799 when the combined Richmond/Brentford team played two matches against Montpelier.

== Noted players ==
Known to have been associated with the Brentford club are Cook and Shock White. Cook was active in the 1730s and was "reckoned one of the best bowlers in England". Shock White, who was more than once referred to as "Shock White of Brentford", is known to have been active between 1761 and 1773 at least.

== After 1799 ==
Brentford Cricket Club is unrecorded after 1799. It may have disbanded in the early part of the 19th century when cricket went into decline due to the impact of the Napoleonic Wars. There is no modern equivalent. The nearest club to Brentford is Kew Cricket Club in neighbouring Kew. This club was established in 1882 through a merger of other local clubs and is currently a member of the Thames Valley Cricket League in the ECB Premier Leagues.
