= 1725 English cricket season =

Cricket season review

In English cricket, the earliest matches known to have involved the 2nd Duke of Richmond and Sir William Gage took place in the 1725 season. The Artillery Ground in Finsbury, soon to become the sport's major venue, was mentioned in a cricketing context for the first time. However, the Honourable Artillery Company was expressing its disapproval of the ground being used for cricket.

== Matches on 15 and 20 July ==
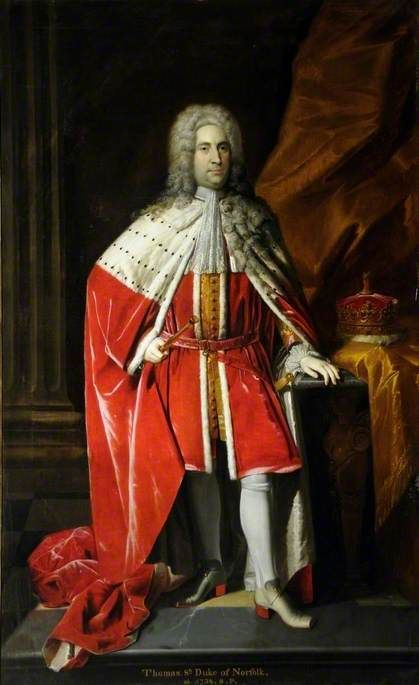
Thomas Howard, 8th Duke of Norfolk hosted a cricket match at Bury Hill on 20 July 1725.

Richmond had written a letter to Gage in July, inviting him to form a team for a match (Note: Any match listed in the ACS' Important Match Guide (1981) is historically important, and therefore of the highest standard, whether or not a scorecard might exist. The same applies to numerous matches discovered by researchers since 1981. For further information, see First-class cricket.) to be played on the 20th. Gage replied on the 16th:

My Lord Duke,

I receiv'd this moment your Grace's letter and am extreamely happy your Grace intends us ye honour of making one a Tuesday and will without fail bring a gentleman with me to play against you, one that has played very seldom for ye severall years.

I am in great affliction from being shamefully beaten yesterday the first match I played ys year. However I will muster up all my courage against Tuesday's engagement. I will trouble your Grace with nothing more than that I wish you success in every thing but yr Cricket Match and that I am etc. etc.

W. Gage
Firle July ye 16th 1725.

Gage's letter is archived in the West Sussex Record Office, on Orchard Street in Chichester. Other than the date and Gage's team having been defeated, nothing is known about the match on the 15th. Gage was a Member of Parliament who represented the former constituency of Seaford from 1722 until his death on 23 April 1744.

The match on the 20th was to be played at Richmond's Goodwood estate, but the report in a Daily Journal newspaper on 21 July confirms Bury Hill (then called Berry Hill), near Arundel, as the venue. The teams are now known as the 2nd Duke of Richmond's XI and Sir William Gage's XI. The match, played before "a vast Concourse of People", was hosted by Thomas Howard, 8th Duke of Norfolk, who gave a ball at Arundel Castle in the evening. The newspaper said Richmond's XI "got the Victory above Forty, which was thought very much", and went on to praise the two teams as "the best that ever was seen to Play".

== The Artillery Ground ==
The Honourable Artillery Company (HAC) had, in 1639, acquired the land in Finsbury that would become the Artillery Ground. It was a multi-purpose venue first mentioned in the context of cricket in 1725 when the HAC said in its Minutes of the Court of Assistants at the Armory:

On the 7th of May, the Clerk [to the Court of Assistants of the Honourable Artillery Company] gave notice to Mr. Robinson, who rented the herbage (having obtained the lease in October 1722, from J. Smith, Jun.) to take up the posts and put a stop to the exercising of horses in the Ground, which was contrary to the lease, besides being 'dishonourable to this Company'.

Mr Robinson apparently took no notice of this and, on 7 October, proceedings were ordered to be taken against him for his neglect, and also for allowing cricket on the ground. A further note was added to the Court Minutes on 7 October concerning abuse done to the herbage of the ground by not only the horses but "also by Crickett Players". Despite HAC disapproval, the ground was being used for big matches only five years later. The earliest known match there was between Middlesex and Surrey on 10 August 1730.

== Other events ==
By 1725, cricket had been recorded in only eight English counties, although there had already been games in India and the Americas. In March 1725, American judge Samuel Sewall recorded instances of his lodger, Sam Hirst, playing cricket on common land in Boston. Sewall referred to the game as "wicket" and it had slight variations from English cricket. The pitch was longer at 25 yards (23 m) instead of 22 yards (20 m); the wickets were only four inches (ten centimetres) high and also much wider than in England.

According to the London Evening Post on 27 March 1725, two men called Campbell and Marshall were arrested while they were playing cricket at Moorfields, north of London. They were charged with robbery, having mugged a courting couple a few days earlier in Islington.

== First mentions ==
=== Teams ===
- Sir William Gage's XI
- 2nd Duke of Richmond's XI

=== Players and patrons ===
- Sir William Gage, 7th Baronet
- Charles Lennox, 2nd Duke of Richmond

=== Venues ===
- Artillery Ground
- Bury Hill

== Bibliography ==
- ACS (1981). A Guide to Important Cricket Matches Played in the British Isles 1709–1863. Nottingham: ACS. OCLC 85045528.
- Bowen, Rowland (1970). Cricket: A History of its Growth and Development. London: Eyre & Spottiswoode. ISBN 978-04-13278-60-9.
- Maun, Ian (2009). From Commons to Lord's, Volume One: 1700 to 1750. Cambridge: Roger Heavens. ISBN 978-19-00592-52-9.
- McCann, Tim (2004). Sussex Cricket in the Eighteenth Century (PDF). Vol. 88. Lewes: West Sussex Record Office. ISBN 978-08-54450-55-8.
- McColl, Paul J. (2000). A View from Long Off: The History of Cricket in Mayfield. Sussex: P. J. McColl. ISBN 978-09-53841-40-0.
- Squire, H. F. & A. P. (1951). Pre-Victorian Sussex Cricket. Sussex: H. F. & A. P. Squire. OCLC 57651565.
