= Sunbury Cricket Club =

Historical English cricket team

Sunbury Cricket Club, representing Sunbury-on-Thames, had a noted team in the first half of the 18th century, which played in three known historically important matches. The club was refounded in 1938. The team now plays in the Surrey Championship and the ECB National Club Cricket Championship.

== History ==
Sunbury was first recorded as a cricket team in connection with one of its players, William Goodwin, whose skill received comment in a 1724 newspaper report. Goodwin is one of the earliest cricketers named in contemporary sources. In 1730, a Sunbury patron known only as Mr Andrews successfully led the team in a match against the 2nd Duke of Richmond's XI. In 1731, Sunbury defeated Kent on Sunbury Common. In 1732, a combined Brentford and Sunbury team lost to London on Walworth Common. Little is known of cricket in Sunbury for the next 200 years.

== Modern club ==
Sunbury-on-Thames was in Middlesex during the 18th century, and is now in Surrey. The modern amateur club, founded in 1938, was a founder member of the Surrey Championship, which since 1999 has been an ECB accredited Premier League, the highest level of recreational club cricket in England and Wales. They also play in the ECB National Club Cricket Championship.

In the early 1970s, the club's Kenton Court Meadow ground hosted three list A matches involving Surrey in the John Player League.

Past players include former West Indies international Jimmy Adams; Richard Johnson, formerly of Somerset, Middlesex, and England; David Nash of Middlesex; and Jamie Hewitt, formerly of Middlesex and Kent.

== Honours ==
- ECB National Club Cricket Championship – Winners: 1974
- Surrey Championship – Winners: 2023, 2016, 2015, 1998, 1988
- Three Counties Sunday League – Winners: 2003, 2002

== Bibliography ==
- Buckley, G. B. (1935). Fresh Light on 18th Century Cricket. Birmingham: Cotterell & Co. OCLC 23450280.
- Maun, Ian (2009). From Commons to Lord's, Volume One: 1700 to 1750. Cambridge: Roger Heavens. ISBN 978-19-00592-52-9.
- Waghorn, H. T. (1899). Cricket Scores, Notes, &c. From 1730–1773. Edinburgh: Blackwood. OCLC 1086375331.
- Waghorn, H. T. (2005) [1906]. The Dawn of Cricket. London: J. W. McKenzie. ISBN 978-09-47821-17-3.
