= White Conduit Fields =

18th century cricket ground

Coordinates: 51.5344°N 0.1100°W

White Conduit Fields cricket ground
- Interactive map of White Conduit Fields cricket ground
- Location: Islington, north London
- Home club: White Conduit Club, Islington Albion Club
- Establishment: before 1718
- Last used: 1834

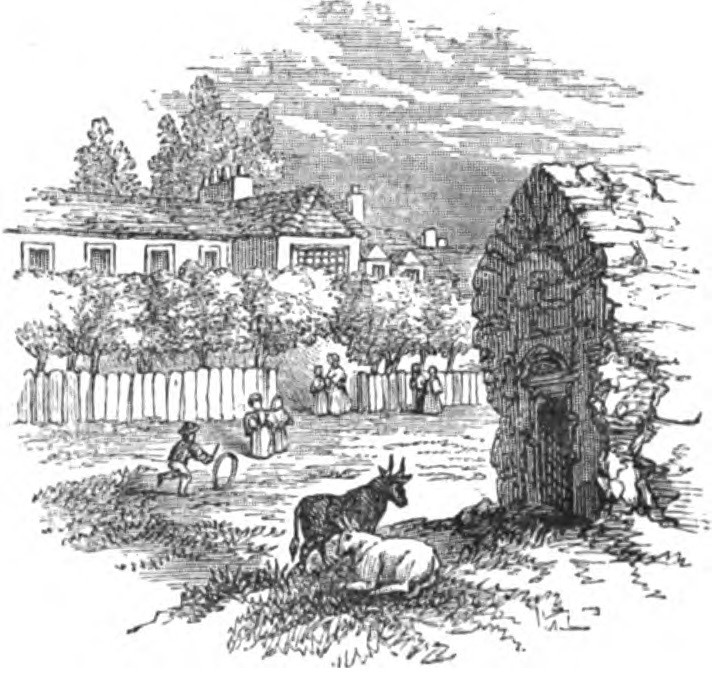
White Conduit House, and the conduit head from which it was named, 1827

White Conduit Fields in Islington was an early venue for cricket and several major matches are known to have been played there in the 18th century. It was the original home of the White Conduit Club, forerunner of Marylebone Cricket Club (MCC). Later it was used by The Islington Albion Cricket Club, who played their last game at the ground in 1834. Maps from the time show that the cricket field was a few hundred metres north of the White Conduit House, in the land surrounding the modern Richmond Crescent, and paintings suggest it was also possibly on the adjacent field to the south at the modern Barnard Park.

== Early matches ==
The earliest match known to have been played at White Conduit Fields was the controversial encounter on Monday, 1 September 1718, between London Cricket Club and the Rochester Punch Club. This game provoked a legal case when the Rochester players walked off in an attempt to save their stake money, London clearly winning at the time. The case focused on the terms of the wager rather than the rules of the sport and the judge ordered the game to be played out. It was concluded in July 1719 at the same venue and London won by 21 runs. London's 21-run victory is the earliest known definite result of any cricket match.

The next known match was on Wednesday, 19 August 1719, between London and Kent. Kent won and the contemporary report concludes with: "The Kentish men won the wager" (i.e., the wager was more important than the match). London and Kent met again on Saturday, 9 July 1720, and this time London won.

After 1720 the important London cricket matches were played at Kennington Common and the Artillery Ground, but White Conduit Fields was still used sporadically for cricket. In 1754 there was a single wicket match, where Falkner and Harris beat the two Bennets by 45 notches. In 1772 there was a cricket match between the butchers of London, when 11 Master Butchers of Newgate Market beat 11 Master Butchers of Clare Market for a money prize. The players began to wrangle and both parties came to blows when Newgate butchers had only a few runs left to chase. In 1773 London played England at White Conduit Fields.

== Other early matches in Islington ==
There are two known matches which took place in the Islington area in 1722 and 1730 but their precise locations are unrecorded or indeterminate. The first match may have been played on or near White Conduit Fields and took place on Wednesday, 18 July 1722 between London and Dartford. Knowledge of the match is via a letter in The Weekly Journal dated 21 July 1722. The match was abandoned following a dispute. The letter said: "A Match at Cricket was made between the little Parish of Dartford in Kent, and the Gentlemen known by the name of the London Club". Teams styled "London" were already in existence but this is the first reference to an actual "London Club".

On Wednesday, 12 August 1730, a London v Kent match began at a place called "Frog Lane" in Islington. Frog Lane was in east Islington, and forms the modern Danbury Street, Rheidol Terrace and Popham Street. It is therefore highly unlikely that this was White Conduit Fields. The source records that "being obliged by their articles to leave off at seven o’clock, they could not finish it". London had a lead of 30 runs when play ended and it was decided to complete the match on Tuesday, 18 August, at Kennington Common. There is no surviving record of the resumption.

== White Conduit Club ==
White Conduit Fields became the home venue of the White Conduit Club from around 1780, and it became a major venue again from 1784 to 1786 when at least four matches involving the club were played there. It is believed that the club members were dissatisfied with the venue because it was "too open" and so they sought a more private location. They authorised Thomas Lord, one of the ground staff bowlers, to do the necessaries and find another venue. Before the 1787 season, the club moved to what is now called Lord's Old Ground in Marylebone.

== Islington Albion Cricket Club ==
Cricket continued to be played at White Conduit Fields for several decades after the White Conduit Club moved to Lord's. The Oldfield family had owned the ground for many generations and operated a dairy farm adjacent to it. A new club called The Islington Albion Club was established in 1805 and held the ground from the Oldfields. The club was named after The Albion tea house, built by Mr Thomas Albion Oldfield at the turn of the nineteenth century, which overlooked the ground. The earliest known games were in 1822 against Chislehurst, and other reported games were played against the Thursday's Kennington, Canonbury, Highgate, Richmond, Hornchurch and Cambridge clubs. The Albion Club played its last game on White Conduit Fields in 1834. In 1835 it moved to a more open ground near Copenhagen House, about a mile north of White Conduit Fields, and later played at Holloway, and Alexandra Park until at least the 1890s before disbanding.

== Ground location and subsequent urban development ==
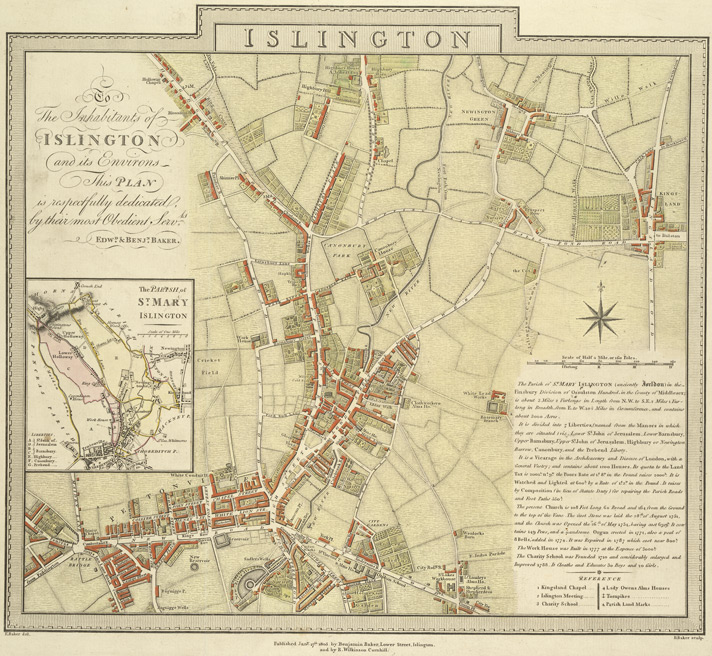
1805 map from a 1793 survey of Islington showing the cricket ground

The cricket field was long supposed to have been in the vicinity of King's Cross railway station. In 2005, a researcher concluded that the site was bounded by the modern streets of Cloudesley Road to the north, Barnsbury Road to the west, Tolpuddle Street to the south and probably as far as Liverpool Road to the east. There exists a White Conduit Street in this area.

However maps from the time show that the cricket field was in the area of the modern Richmond Crescent, and it was bounded by Richmond Avenue to the south and the modern Thornhill Road cutting across the eastern part of the field. Eighteenth century paintings also indicate this more northerly location, or possibly the field immediately south of the one shown on the maps for pre-1787 matches. They show it is situated a few hundred metres directly north of the White Conduit House and close to the Islington Workhouse, which was located just behind on Barnsbury Street.

The venue has disappeared under the spread of urban development. The Regent's Canal was cut through the land in the years after 1810 and passed almost directly under White Conduit House. The Islington Albion Club played at White Conduit Fields from 1805 to 1834, by which time some of the ground, which formed part of the Oldfield dairy farm, had already been lost. A part of the south of the ground had been incorporated into nursery grounds (owned by Mr Smith of Liverpool and others), and later maps show that the ground had become less open, before it was built upon with housing from 1839 onwards.

== Bibliography ==
- ACS (1981). A Guide to Important Cricket Matches Played in the British Isles 1709 – 1863. Nottingham: ACS.
- Buckley, G. B. (1935). Fresh Light on 18th Century Cricket. Cotterell.
- Buckley, G. B. (1937). Fresh Light on pre-Victorian Cricket. Cotterell.
- Haygarth, Arthur (1862). Scores & Biographies, Volume 1 (1744–1826). Lillywhite.
- McCann, Tim (2004). Sussex Cricket in the Eighteenth Century. Sussex Record Society.
- Maun, Ian (2009). From Commons to Lord's, Volume One: 1700 to 1750. Roger Heavens. ISBN 978-1-900592-52-9.
- Waghorn, H. T. (1899). Cricket Scores, Notes, etc. (1730–1773). Blackwood.
- Waghorn, H. T. (1906). The Dawn of Cricket. Electric Press.
- Wilson, Martin (2005). An Index to Waghorn. Bodyline.
