= Cow Meadow =

County cricket venue in Northampton, England

- Location: Northampton
- County club: Northamptonshire
- Establishment: by 1741
- Last used: 1741

Cow Meadow, renamed Becket's Park in 1935, was an 18th-century county cricket venue situated alongside the River Nene near the centre of Northampton. It is known to have been used for two matches in August 1741. On Saturday, 15 August, a combined Northamptonshire & Huntingdonshire team played Bedfordshire and won. The second match on Tuesday, 18 August, was between Northamptonshire and Buckinghamshire and played for 20 guineas per side.

== Bibliography ==
- Buckley, G. B. (1935). Fresh Light on 18th Century Cricket. Cotterell.
- Maun, Ian (2009). From Commons to Lord's, Volume One: 1700 to 1750. Roger Heavens. ISBN 978-1-900592-52-9.
- Waghorn, H. T. (1899). Cricket Scores, Notes, etc. (1730–1773). Blackwood.
