= Kingston Cricket Club =

Historical English cricket team

Representing Kingston upon Thames in Surrey, the original Kingston Cricket Club was prominent in the 18th century, taking part in known matches from 1720 to 1767. According to surviving records, it had no specific venue and is known to have played at both Kennington Common and Moulsey Hurst. Kingston teams are recorded, either individually or jointly with other clubs, in eleven known major matches.

== Matches ==
On Wednesday, 6 July 1720, a game between Kingston and Richmond is one of the earliest known major matches. The venue is unknown but Kingston won. The next record is a match in September 1731 when Kingston played Surrey at Moulsey Hurst and was defeated by an unknown margin. This match was played for 25 guineas a side and "some thousands of persons of both sexes were present on this occasion".

A team called Kingston and Moulsey played two matches in July 1739 against London, winning both times, the second by the close margin of three runs. In July 1743, a combined Kingston and Richmond side played two matches against London and lost them both. In 1745, Kingston played Lambeth at Kennington Common on Wednesday, 24 July, and London at the Artillery Ground on Wednesday, 7 August. Neither result is known.

The next mention is in 1751 when a combined Kingston and Hampton team played Richmond at Moulsey Hurst on Wednesday, 4 September, but no other details are known. Kingston and Hampton played each other at Hampton Court Green on Thursday, 10 July 1755, Hampton winning by 3 wickets. The final mention of Kingston is on Wednesday, 23 September 1767 when they defeated Richmond by 2 wickets at Richmond Green.

Kingston Cricket Club is unrecorded after 1767. It may have disbanded in the later part of the 18th century and there is no modern equivalent. The nearest club to Kingston is Hampton Wick Royal Cricket Club in Bushy Park. This club was established in 1863 and is currently a member of the Surrey Championship in the ECB Premier Leagues.

== Bibliography ==
- Ashley-Cooper, F. S. (1900). "At the Sign of the Wicket: Cricket 1742–1751". Cricket.
- Buckley, G. B. (1935). Fresh Light on 18th Century Cricket. Cotterell.
- Haygarth, Arthur (1862). Scores & Biographies, Volume 1 (1744–1826). Lillywhite.
- McCann, Tim (2004). Sussex Cricket in the Eighteenth Century. Sussex Record Society.
- Maun, Ian (2009). From Commons to Lord's, Volume One: 1700 to 1750. Roger Heavens. ISBN 978-1-900592-52-9.
- Waghorn, H. T. (1899). Cricket Scores, Notes, etc. (1730–1773). Blackwood.
- Waghorn, H. T. (1906). The Dawn of Cricket. Electric Press.
- Wilson, Martin (2005). An Index to Waghorn. Bodyline.
