= Chelsea Common =

Cricket field in London, England

- Interactive map of Chelsea Common
- Location: Chelsea, London, England
- Coordinates: 51°29′20″N 0°10′23.88″W
- Home club: Chelsea Cricket Club
- Establishment: 18th century
- Last used: 18th century

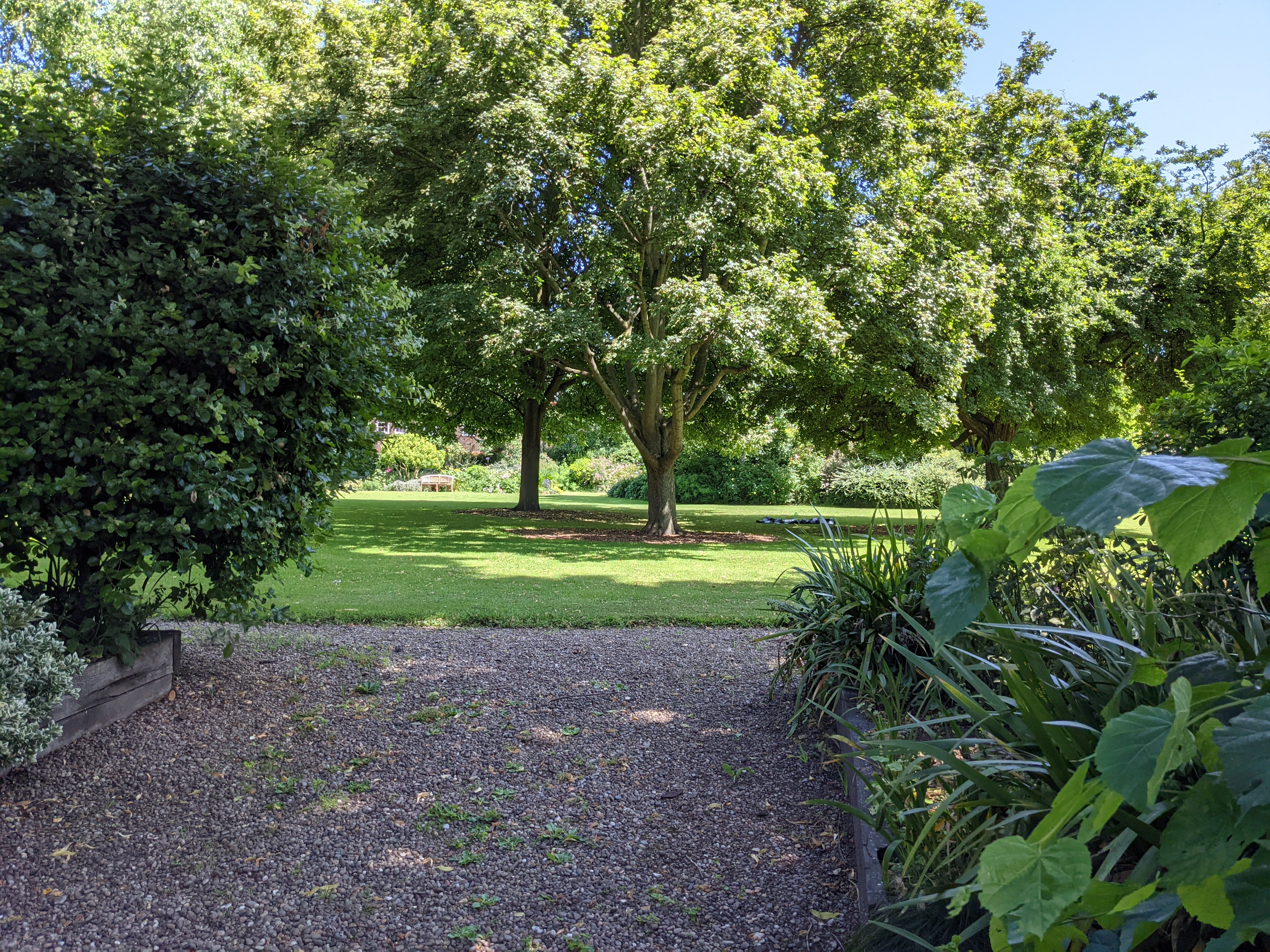
The Chelsea Common

Chelsea Common was the ground of Chelsea Cricket Club in the 18th century, an area that virtually disappeared under building work in the 19th century.

Records have survived of five matches between 1731 and 1789 which either involved the Chelsea club or were played on the common. The first, played on the common for the high stake of 50 guineas, was Chelsea v Fulham in July 1731. In August 1736 there was an inter-county match on the common between Middlesex and Surrey. The stake was 50 guineas and Middlesex won by 9 runs.
