= Hampton Cricket Club =

Historical English cricket team

Representing Hampton which was then in Middlesex, the original Hampton Cricket Club was prominent in the 18th century, taking part in known matches from 1726 to 1771. According to surviving records, it had no specific venue and is known to have played at both Hampton Court Green and Moulsey Hurst.

The earliest known mention of Hampton as a cricket club is a single wicket match at Moulsey Hurst in August 1726. The contestants were Piper of Hampton and Perry of London Cricket Club. The first mention of Hampton in an eleven-a-side match is against Brentford at Moulsey Hurst in July 1731. The result is unknown but a contemporary newspaper announcement, published a day earlier, states that "above £500 is already laid on their heads, neither team having ever yet been beat".

The team continued to play until 1771, sometimes as a combined Kingston and Hampton team. The last matches recorded as played by the team were in July 1771 when a combined Hampton, Brentford and Richmond team played two matches against Chertsey Cricket Club at Laleham Burway and at Richmond Green.

The club is unrecorded after 1771. It may have disbanded in the later part of the 18th century and there is no definite modern equivalent. The nearest club to Hampton is Hampton Wick Royal Cricket Club in Bushy Park. This club was established in 1863 and is a member of the Surrey Championship.

== Bibliography ==
- Buckley, G. B. (1935). Fresh Light on 18th Century Cricket. Birmingham: Cotterell & Co. OCLC 23450280.
- Maun, Ian (2009). From Commons to Lord's, Volume One: 1700 to 1750. Cambridge: Roger Heavens. ISBN 978-19-00592-52-9.
