= Duppas Hill =

Hill and park in the London Borough of Croydon, England

Coordinates: 51°22′2″N 0°6′35″W

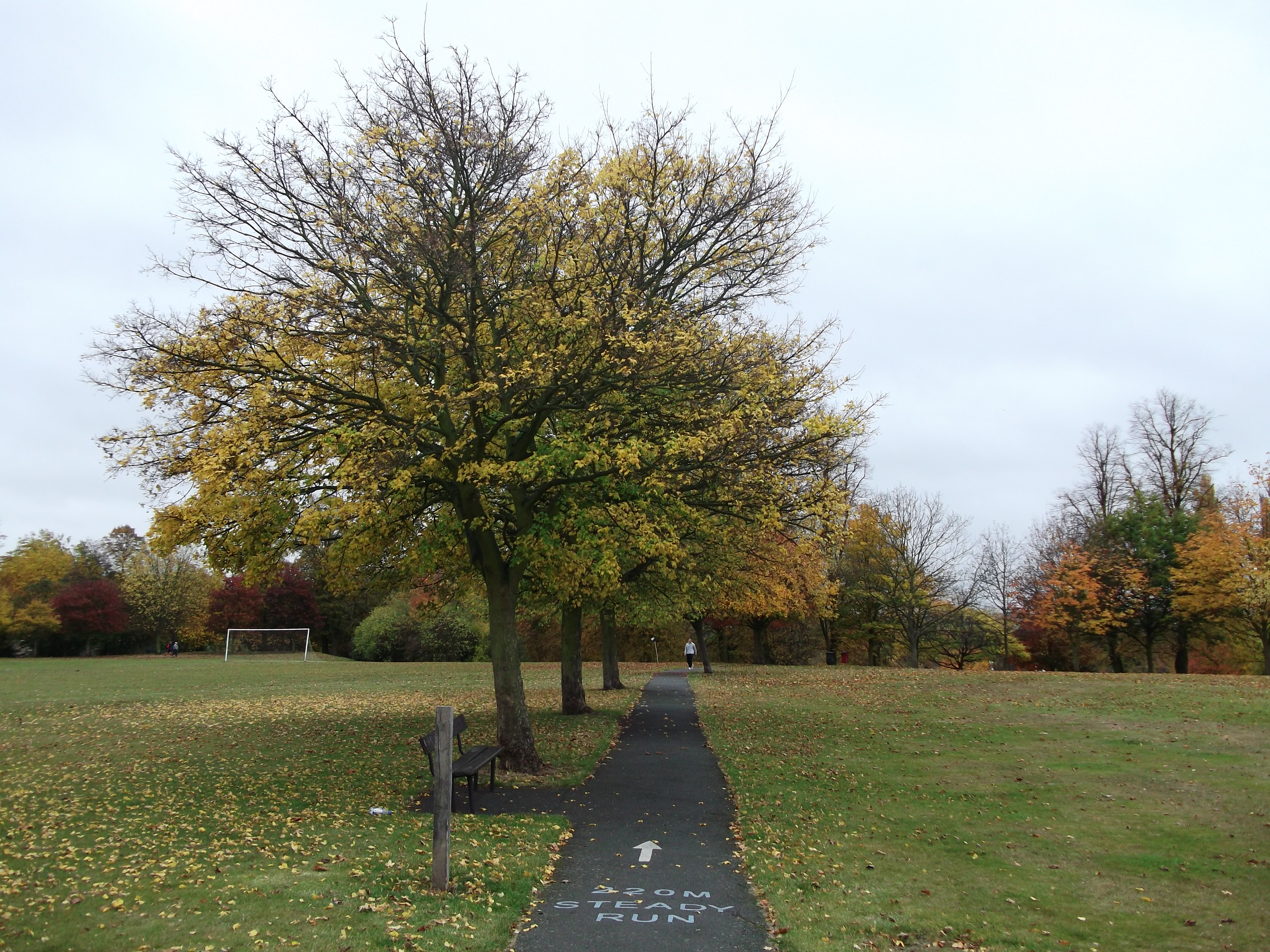
Duppas Hill Recreation Ground between Duppas Hill Road (A232) and Cooper Road

Duppas Hill (or Duppa's Hill) is a park, road and surrounding residential area in Waddon, near Croydon in Greater London (and historically in Surrey).

Duppas Hill has a long history of sport and recreation. It is said that jousting took place there in medieval times and the story goes that Lord William de Warenne was treacherously slain there during a joust in 1286.

== Cricket ==
Duppas Hill cricket ground
- Interactive map of Duppas Hill cricket ground
- Location: Croydon, Surrey
- Home club: Croydon Cricket Club
- County club: Surrey
- Establishment: by 1707
- Last used: 1798

Duppas Hill was used by Croydon Cricket Club for cricket matches in the 18th century. The earliest known match took place in 1707 when Croydon played the London Club. It is recorded frequently in the 1730s as the home venue of Croydon and sometimes by Surrey.

== Workhouse ==
Duppas Hill was the site of the Croydon workhouse. In 1726 the Vestry of Croydon resolved to erect the town's first workhouse at a site on what was then called Dubber's or Duppa's hill, after Bishop Brian Duppa. The establishment was open by the end of the following year and governed by a committee of Trustees. In 1836 it became the Croydon Poor Law Union workhouse. The workhouse moved to a new building at Thornton Heath in 1866, but the infirmary remained in the Duppas Hill buildings until 1885 and the establishment of a new infirmary (later Mayday Hospital, and now Croydon University Hospital) close to the new workhouse.

== Public recreation ==
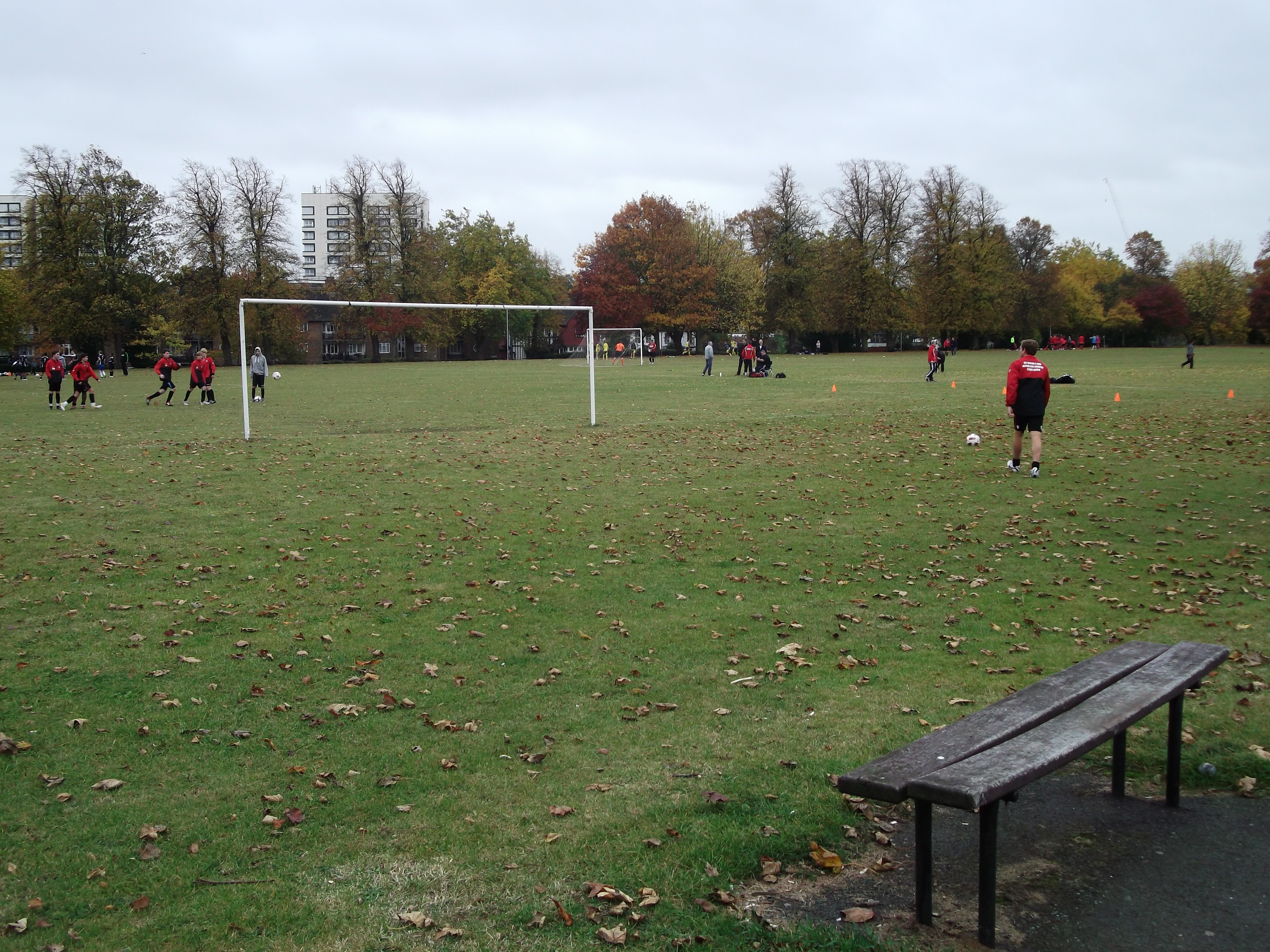
Sunday football on Duppas Hill Recreational Ground

There has been a public park at Duppas Hill since 1865, when the Croydon Board of Health bought land from the Ecclesiastical Commissioners for £2,000 to create Croydon's first recreation ground. It was laid out with paths, a bandstand, pavilion and an ornate drinking fountain. The Board of Health had to deal with cattle trespassing, drinking booths and other problems. The Board had proposed enclosing it with iron posts and railings intending to turn the area into a park rather than a recreation ground for all to enjoy sports and games freely, and in particular aimed to restrict horse-riding. Some of the Board wanted to ban horse-riding completely on the public open space, others to ban grooms exercising horses but not the general public riding for pleasure. Sir Francis Head, a famous soldier who lived at Duppas Hall overlooking the park, chaired a large public meeting to prevent the enclosure, wrote letters and memoranda to the press and headed a memorial of 3,500 people protesting against enclosure. He argued that the horse riders protected defenceless ladies, but he was eventually satisfied with notices forbidding people from exercising their horses, with Duppas Hill becoming the space for recreation it still is today.

The ground was used for public celebrations and firework displays. On the eve of the 1926 General Strike, it was the venue of a mass rally of trade unionists and workers. In World War II it hosted a baseball match between American and Canadian soldiers.

Today the park is still a recreation ground, and football and cricket are still played there. Part of the site was used as the Heath Clark school, later part of Croydon College, which has now been developed into housing.

== Duppas Hill Road and Duppas Hill Lane ==
Duppas Hill Road/Lane
- A232

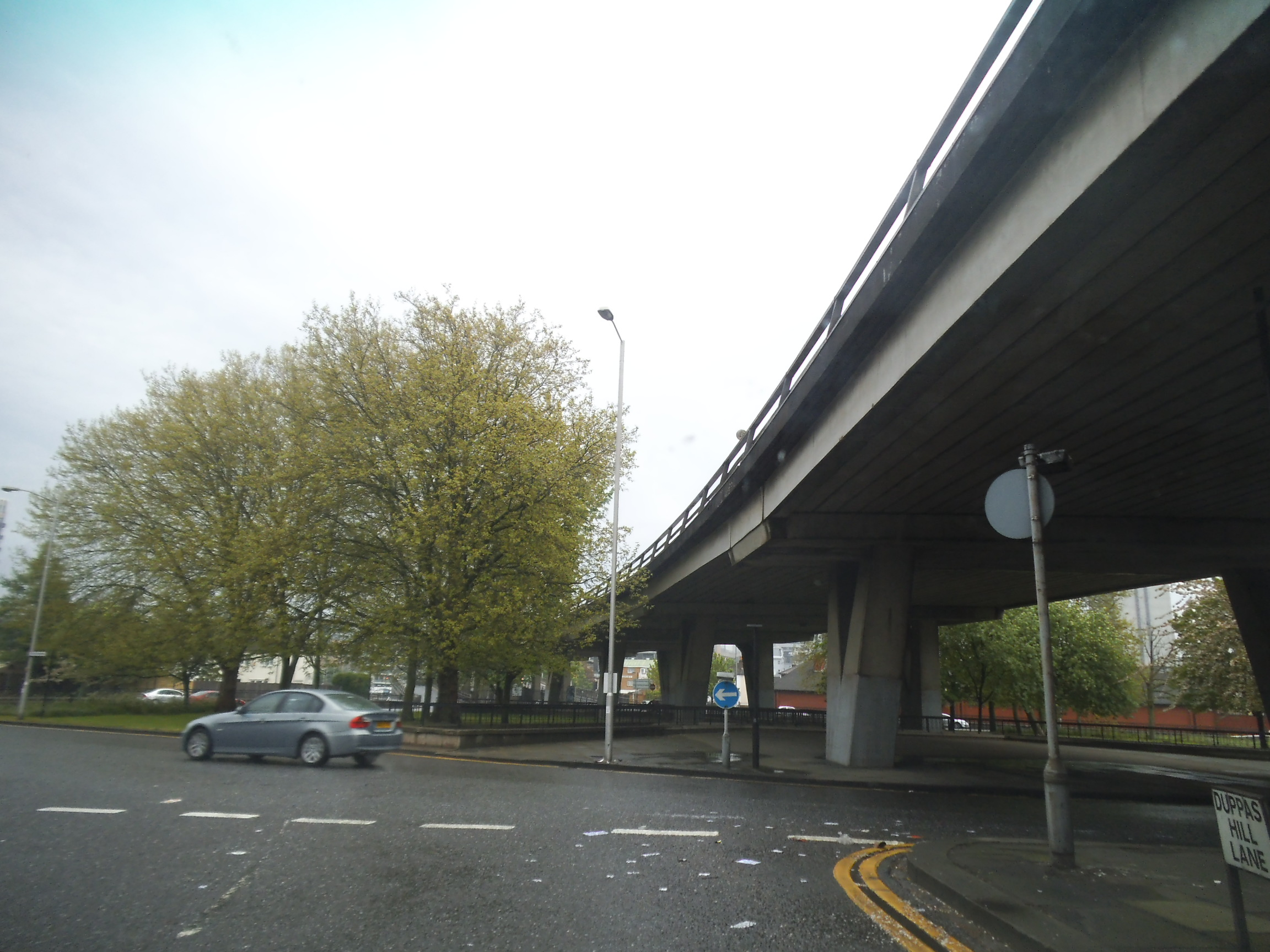
- The Croydon flyover from Duppas Hill Lane roundabout
- Interactive map of Duppas Hill Road/Lane
- Length: 0.5 mi (0.80 km)
- Postal code: CR0 4BG
- west end: Epsom Road
- east end: A236

The road is a section of the Ewell to Orpington A232 road, preceded by Stafford Road to the west and succeeded by the Croydon Flyover to the east. It is a no-stopping Red Route for its entire length (except slip roads).

== See also ==
- List of Parks and Open Spaces in Croydon
