= Croydon Cricket Club =

Historical English cricket team

The original Croydon Cricket Club, based at Croydon (then part of Surrey), was prominent in the 18th century, and played most of its matches at Duppas Hill.

== History ==
The earliest record of the club is in the 1707 season when it played two matches against London. Croydon had a very strong team in the 1731 season, beating London four times. The team continued to be prominent through the 1730s, but was less so in the 1740s, and the club was barely mentioned again after that except in a few minor matches. It is believed to have disbanded in the later part of the 18th century.

== Modern club ==
In 2018, a club that was previously named Croydon Cricket Club of India (CCCI) was re-branded as Croydon Cricket Club (CCC), with the aim of uniting cricket played in Croydon. It is not affiliated to the original Croydon Cricket Club. Its home ground is Croygas which is located in Mollison Drive, Wallington. The club participates in the Surrey Cricket League (SCL), and the Fullers Brewery Surrey County League (FBSCL).

== Bibliography ==
- Buckley, G. B. (1935). Fresh Light on 18th Century Cricket. Birmingham: Cotterell & Co. OCLC 23450280.
- Waghorn, H. T. (2005) [1906]. The Dawn of Cricket. London: J. W. McKenzie. ISBN 978-09-47821-17-3.
