= Richmond Green cricket ground =

English cricket ground

Coordinates: 51.4615°N 0.3067°W

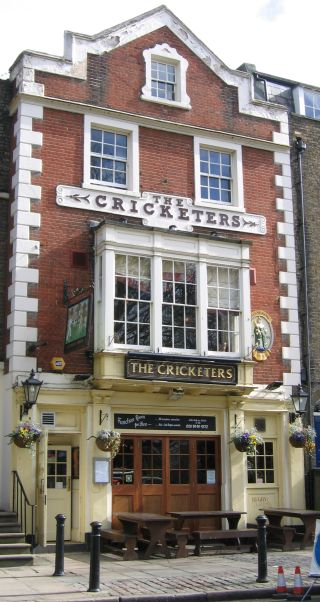
- The Cricketers pub on Richmond Green
- Interactive map of Richmond Green cricket ground
- Location: Richmond, London
- Home club: Richmond Cricket Club (c. 18th century); village teams associated with the pubs The Prince's Head and The Cricketers (currently)
- County club: Surrey
- Establishment: by 1666

Richmond Green cricket ground, on The Green at Richmond, London, has been a venue for cricket matches since the 17th century. The earliest reference dates from May 1666 and some matches were played there in the first half of the 18th century. A match in 1731, which culminated in a riot, is the earliest in cricket history of which team scores are known. The result of a match in July 1741 is the sport's earliest known tie.

== History ==
The earliest reference to cricket on The Green is from May 1666 when Sir Robert Paston, a resident of Richmond, wrote a letter to his wife and mentioned that their son had taken part in "a game of criquett [sic] on Richmond Green".

The first specific match that is known to have been played on The Green was between Surrey and Middlesex in June 1730. Surrey won but no details have survived.

The following year, on 23 August, a match between Mr Chambers' XI (a Richmond team) and the Duke of Richmond's XI (Sussex) is the earliest in cricket history of which team scores are known. Richmond's XI totalled 79 runs in their first innings and Chambers' XI replied with 119 to take a first innings lead of 40. Richmond's XI were all out for 72 in their second innings, so Chambers' XI needed 33 to win. The game ended promptly at a pre-agreed time when Chambers' XI had "four or five more to have come in" and needed "about 8 to 10 notches". The result was, therefore, a draw and this caused a fracas among the crowd who were incensed by the prompt finish because the Duke of Richmond had arrived late and delayed the start of the game. The riot resulted in some of Richmond's players "having their shirts tore off their backs: and 'tis said a law suit will commence about the play". The stake was 200 guineas.

On 22 July 1741, a match between Surrey and London resulted in cricket's earliest known tie.

The first time Richmond Cricket Club are known to have played on The Green was on 4 July 1743 when a combined Richmond & Kingston team was defeated by London. The noted Kent player Robert Colchin guested for London and the match is his earliest recorded mention. Later matches on The Green involved the Richmond club against other parish teams – for example, Chertsey in 1761, 1765 and 1771; Kingston in 1767; and Montpelier in 1799 and 1800.

== Present day ==
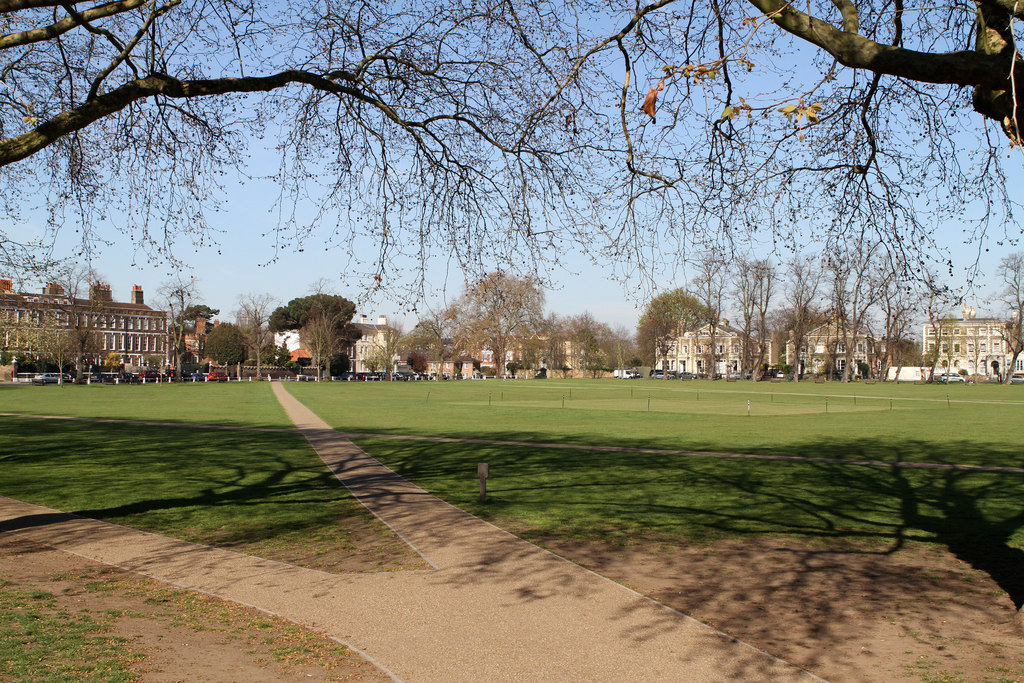
Richmond Green cricket field in 2012

The Green is presently home to two village cricket teams each affiliated to two of Richmond's pubs, The Prince's Head and The Cricketers. Midweek matches are contested in the modern limited-overs format of Twenty20, usually on a Tuesday or Thursday, where surrounding village teams compete for the Len Smith Charity Shield.

== Bibliography ==
- ACS (1981). A Guide to Important Cricket Matches Played in the British Isles 1709–1863. Nottingham: ACS. OCLC 85045528.
- Buckley, G. B. (1935). Fresh Light on 18th Century Cricket. Birmingham: Cotterell & Co. OCLC 23450280.
- Maun, Ian (2009). From Commons to Lord's, Volume One: 1700 to 1750. Cambridge: Roger Heavens. ISBN 978-19-00592-52-9.
- Waghorn, H. T. (1899). Cricket Scores, Notes, &c. From 1730–1773. Edinburgh: Blackwood. OCLC 1086375331.
