= Walworth Common =

Cricket venue in Walworth, Surrey, England

Walworth Common in Surrey was a cricket venue known to have been used in the 18th century. There are no records of matches on the common after 1732, but a later venue in the area was Aram's New Ground, also known as the Bee Hive Ground, the home of Montpelier Cricket Club from 1796. The Walworth Common ground was situated where Westmoreland Road, Faraday Street and Mann Street stood in 1900. F. S. Ashley-Cooper said it was "about three-quarters of a mile from where Montpelier's Bee Hive Ground afterwards existed".

== Bibliography ==
- Buckley, G. B. (1935). Fresh Light on 18th Century Cricket. Birmingham: Cotterell & Co. OCLC 23450280.
- Maun, Ian (2009). From Commons to Lord's, Volume One: 1700 to 1750. Cambridge: Roger Heavens. ISBN 978-19-00592-52-9.
