= Datchet Common =

Cricket venue near Datchet, England

Coordinates: 51.48°N 0.57°W

Datchet Common cricket ground
- Interactive map of Datchet Common cricket ground
- Location: Datchet, Berkshire
- Home club: Berkshire
- Establishment: c.1769
- Last used: c.1790

Datchet Common near Datchet in the English county of Berkshire (formerly Buckinghamshire) was used as a cricket venue for matches between 1730 and 1785.

It is first recorded in October 1730 when a match was played "by persons of distinction for £50 a side". This match is the earliest known mention of cricket in the county of Buckinghamshire.
