= London Cricket Club =

Historical English cricket team

Team information
- Established: before 1722
- Last match: c.1769
- Home venue: Artillery Ground

History
- Notable players: John Bowra, Lord John Sackville, Little and Tall Bennett

The original London Cricket Club was formed in 1722 and was one of the foremost clubs in English cricket over the next four decades, playing numerous historically important matches. It is closely associated with the Artillery Ground, where it played most of its home matches.

== Early history of London cricket ==
The earliest definite mention of cricket being played anywhere is at Guildford in the 16th century and there can be little doubt that the game had reached London by that time. Even so, there is no written reference to the game in London until 1680.

A publication called The Post Man reported from 21 June 1707 to 24 June 1707 that "two great matches at cricket (to be) plaid, between London and Croydon; the first at Croydon on Tuesday, July 1st, and the other to be plaid in Lamb's-Conduit-Fields, near Holborn, on the Tuesday following, being the 3rd of July". No match reports could be found so the results and scores are unknown (3 July in 1707 was a Thursday).

The 1707 London team may have been just an occasional XI as the foundation date of London Cricket Club is unknown. But it was in existence by 1722 when it was referred to in a match against Dartford.

== The Noblemen's and Gentlemen's Club ==
London Cricket Club was founded and organised by members of what is usually termed the Noblemen's and Gentlemen's Club, which had its headquarters at the Star and Garter on Pall Mall in London. This gentlemen's club was multi-functional, though essentially of a social and sporting nature, but its purpose was to encourage and enable gambling. For example, its members also founded the Jockey Club and were usually involved with organising big prizefighting events. Cricket throughout the 18th century was funded by gambling interests and attracted huge stakes.

Gambling has always had an unsavoury nature, and eventually the Artillery Ground became a place of ill-repute. The club members became uneasy about associating with a place that was widely known for licentious and, occasionally, riotous behaviour, even though it showcased cricket of the highest class. Cricket was severely impacted by the Seven Years' War from 1756 to 1763 and the number of matches played greatly reduced. There are signs of the game returning to its rural roots during this period and evidently the aristocrats were happy with that development. Apart from four matches in the 1769 English cricket season, there are few mentions of London as a team in the aftermath of the Seven Years' War and many of the references suggest that these teams were in fact occasional "London XIs" rather than representing an organised London club.

The Artillery Ground itself began to be used less and less after 1763. A match on 15 September 1778 is the last important one played there. Hambledon was already by then the predominant centre of English cricket and a lot of games were being played at other outlying venues such as Laleham Burway, Bishopsbourne Paddock and Sevenoaks Vine. London for the time being had been abandoned.

It is reasonable to assume that the London Cricket Club was disbanded during the Seven Years' War. With its demise and the war situation, the "honourable gentlemen" retreated to the countryside and founded or at least augmented the Hambledon Club, which was the main centre of cricket from about 1765 for the next twenty years.

In the early 1780s, the gentlemen decided to re-establish themselves in the vicinity of London and founded the White Conduit Club in Islington. But they were not happy about the environment of White Conduit Fields and commissioned Thomas Lord to find a "more private venue". He opened Lord's Old Ground in 1787 in Marylebone. The gentlemen moved their cricketing interests there and reinvented themselves as Marylebone Cricket Club (MCC), which is thus a direct continuation of the old London Cricket Club.

== Players ==
Very little is known of London's players during its heyday, from the 1720s to the 1760s. The following are the names that have been recorded by the season in which they are first mentioned in the sources.

- 1726 – Perry (took part in the earliest known single wicket match)
- 1731 – "the famous" Tim Coleman
- 1732 – Christopher Jones (Artillery Ground keeper)
- 1735 – Cook, Dunn, Ellis (London's "best bowler"), Marshall, Pool, Wakeland, Wheatley
- 1739 – John Bowra, Lord John Sackville
- 1744 – Little Bennett, Tall Bennett, George Smith (Artillery Ground keeper), Butler, Hodder, Howlett, Norris
- 1745 – William Anderson, Norton
- 1747 – Thomas Jure
- 1748 – George Carter, John Capon, Walker
- 1753 – William King
- 1755 – Clowder
- 1759 – Gascoigne

== Matches ==
In the 1720s, the London club seemed to share its time between Kennington Common and White Conduit Fields but it increasingly began to use the Artillery Ground from 1730.

The 1730s were the glory days of London Cricket Club and it completely dominated the cricket scene, especially given its royal and aristocratic patronage. One of the earliest good players mentioned is "the famous Tim Coleman" who was referred as such in 1731 when it was rare to see any player named in the newspapers.

London's main opponents in the 1730s were Croydon and Dartford. They played matches against various other parish clubs, and sometimes took on county teams, mainly Kent, Surrey and Sussex. There is sometimes confusion in the reports when London is identified with Middlesex and vice versa but, in general, London means the club and Middlesex was a team of players born in the county who were not necessarily of the London club.

The club's best season may have been the 1732 season when it was unbeaten. As a report recounts after the final match: This is the thirteenth match the London gamesters have played this year and not lost one match.

As the 1730s progressed, London continued to be generally successful. From time to time, challengers appeared. Chertsey Cricket Club first made its mark in the 1736 season and London also had some tight contests against Chislehurst in the late 1730s.

But the biggest challenge to London's dominance emerged in the 1741 season. This was Slindon which starred the great all-rounder Richard Newland and was backed by the Duke of Richmond. After Slindon beat Surrey "almost in one innings" at the end of that season, it was inevitable they would come to the Artillery Ground and play London. This happened in 1742 when two matches were played against a background of furious gambling with huge wagers being laid against Newland's expected performance. London prevailed, winning the first match "with great difficulty" and then, having been assisted by the weather, thrashing Slindon by 184 runs in the second.

It was London's turn to be thrashed in 1743 when they played another of the "great little clubs": Addington Cricket Club who, on their first appearance at the Artillery Ground, easily won by an innings and 4 runs. Addington did have the great player Robert Colchin as a given man.

In 1744, Slindon were back and in June they beat London by 55 runs in a match whose scores have been preserved by the earliest known cricket scorecard. Slindon beat London again in September and proceeded to issue their audacious challenge to play against any parish in England. London did not take up the challenge: only Addington and Bromley felt able to respond.

There was a noticeable increase in the popularity of single wicket contests in the late 1740s although the London club often arranged these at the Artillery Ground. In the eleven-a-side game, county matches or games involving "best elevens" were the norm and, as the 1750s began, London was really playing parish matches only unless it had several given men.
