= Artillery Ground =

Open space in Finsbury

Coordinates: 51.5219°N 0.0887°W

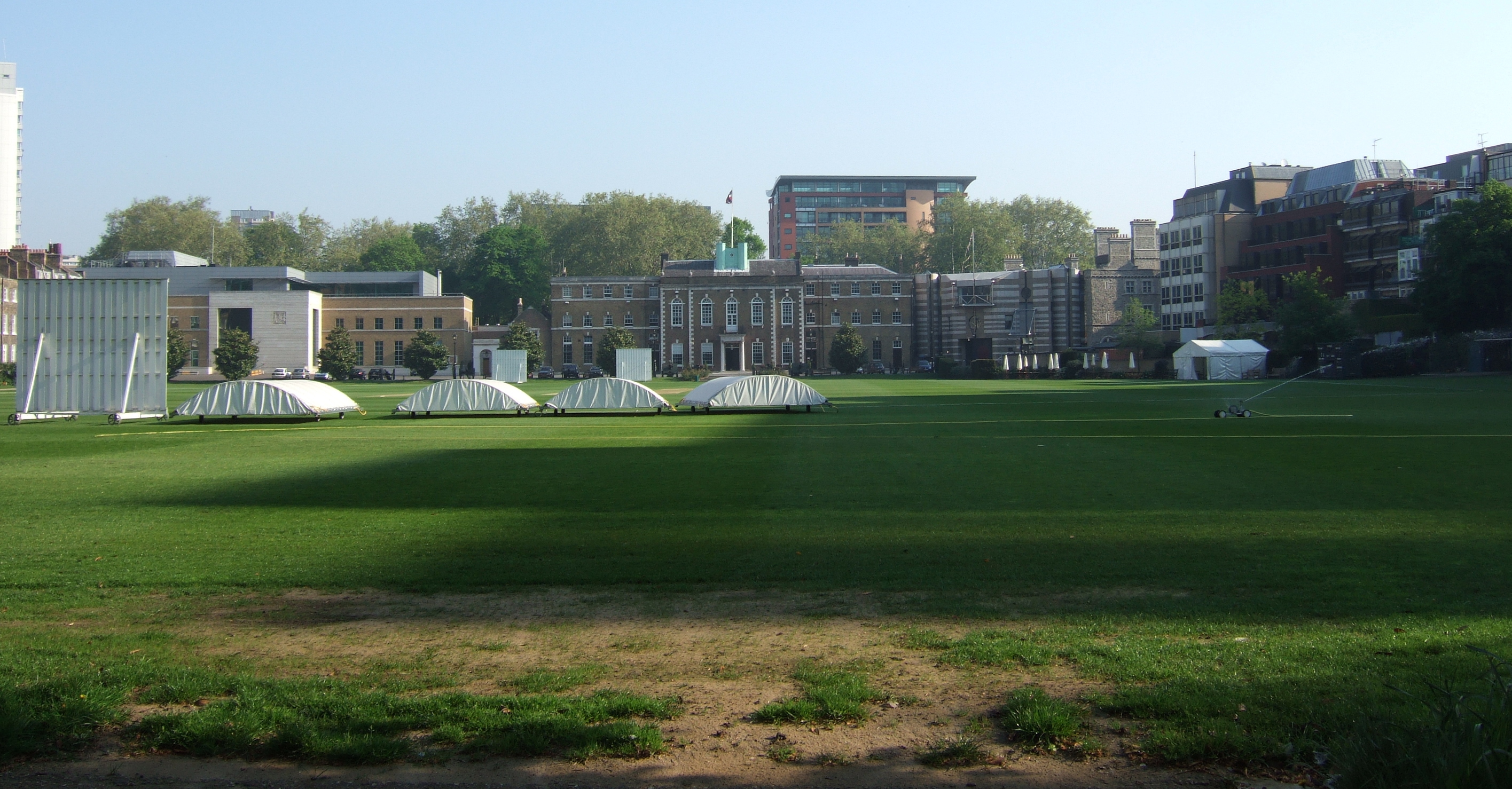
- The Artillery Ground in 2008
- Interactive map of Artillery Ground
- Location: Finsbury, Islington
- Home club: London Cricket Club; Honourable Artillery Company Cricket Club
- Establishment: by 1730

The Artillery Ground in Finsbury is an open space originally set aside for archery. It later became a famous cricket venue, known to have staged over 200 historically important matches from 1730 to 1778. (Note: Any match listed in the ACS' Important Match Guide (1981) is historically important, and therefore of the highest standard, whether or not a scorecard might exist. The same applies to numerous matches discovered by researchers since 1981. For further information, see First-class cricket.) Today, the ground is used for military exercises, and for cricket, football, and rugby matches. It belongs to the Honourable Artillery Company (HAC), whose headquarters, Armoury House, overlook the ground.

== History ==
=== Origins ===
From 1498, about 11 acres (4.5 hectare) of the 23-acre (9.3 ha) Bunhill Fields were set aside for the practice of archery and 'shooting'. Today's 8-acre (3.2 ha) site was acquired by the Honourable Artillery Company (HAC) in 1638. The HAC had formerly owned a site in Bishopsgate, and this was finally sold in 1658.

In 18th century sources, the Artillery Ground was said to lie between Chiswell Street and Bunhill Fields, the latter being a cemetery. According to a report dated 23 June 1722 in The London Journal: 'the entrance to it is by a handsome pair of iron gates to the south side next Chiswell-Street'. It was sometimes described in contemporary cricket reports as the 'old' Artillery Ground, which may have been a reference to its prior use for military purposes, and for other sports or entertainment.

=== Earliest mention of cricket ===
Crop of Christopher and John Greenwood's 8 inch-to-mile map published in 1827 from an 1830 republication (click to view all). The image shows Bunhill Fields immediately north of the Artillery Ground, with Chiswell Street to the south.

Though it was always a multi-purpose venue, the ground became famous for cricket through the mid-Georgian period. It was first mentioned in a cricketing context in the 1725 season. The HAC were angry about damage being done to the grass by horses, and said in their Minutes of the Court of Assistants at the Armory:

On the 7th of May, the Clerk [to the Court of Assistants of the Honourable Artillery Company] gave notice to Mr. Robinson, who rented the herbage (having obtained the lease in October 1722, from J. Smith, Jun.) to take up the posts and put a stop to the exercising of horses in the Ground, which was contrary to the lease, besides being 'dishonourable to this Company'.

Mr Robinson apparently took no notice of this and, on 7 October, proceedings were ordered to be taken against him for his neglect, and also for allowing cricket on the ground. A further note was added to the Court Minutes on 7 October concerning abuse done to the herbage of the ground by not only the horses, but 'also by Crickett Players'.

=== 1730s ===
Despite the HAC's initial disapproval, the ground was being used for big matches only five years later. The earliest known historically important match there was between Middlesex and Surrey on Monday, 10 August 1730. The Artillery Ground soon became the feature venue for cricket in the mid-18th century; Harry Altham said it was 'indeed the precursor of Lord's'.

Middlesex won that "inaugural" match by an unknown margin. Two more matches were held on the ground that season. Both were between London and Surrey, so they were London's earliest-known matches on what became their home ground. First, on Monday, 31 August, London defeated Surrey by 6 runs for a stake of 20 guineas. The second match was due to be played on Friday, 4 September, but no post-match report has been found. The ground quickly became London's first choice venue with six of their twelve home matches recorded there in 1731: three against Dartford, two against Croydon, and one against Kent.

A report in 1732 states that the playing area was staked out and roped off. This practice was first reported at Kennington Common the previous year, and cricket is believed to be the first sport to enclose its venues. The Artillery Ground was charging spectators a two pence admission fee by the early 1740s. It is believed that the fee was introduced in the 1730s, cricket also being the first sport to charge for admission.

=== 1740s ===
By the 1740s, the Artillery Ground had become the sport's feature venue and for about twenty years it had a social status that only Lord's Cricket Ground has subsequently equalled. Single wicket was especially popular in the 1740s and huge crowds gambling huge sums of money were attracted to the ground whenever these contests took place.

The history of the ground is coloured by references to its keepers, or lessees. The first known reference is in The Craftsman dated Sat 26 February 1732 (Julian date) re Mr Christopher Jones, Master of the Artillery Ground, at the Pyed Horse public house in Chiswell Street. The keepers were responsible for maintaining order at the ground. For example, Jones posted a notice in the newspapers that advertised a London v Kent match on 5 July 1733 as 'for one guinea each man with wickets to be pitched at one o'clock and the spectators to keep outside the line round the ground. If any persons get on the Walls [sic] they will be prosecuted as the Law directs; and the Company are desired to come through the Py'd Horse Yard, Chiswell Street'. Obviously, by coming through the pub, many might well stop and buy a drink. Jones, as the landlord, would have no objection to that.

The most charismatic keeper was George Smith who had frequent disputes with the HAC during his tenure. He also had money problems and there are surviving reports of his attempts to pay off his debts by raising the ground admission and then being forced to reduce it again.

Before the creation of the Hambledon Club in the 1760s, the Artillery Ground was the featured venue of all London cricket, but it eventually fell into disrepute because of uncontrolled gambling, and ceased to be used for top-class matches after the 1778 season. On 24 and 25 August 1778, it hosted London v Dartford, historically one of its main fixtures. Pre-match notices billed the event as "Hampshire v England" but that fixture was postponed, and London v Dartford was played instead. The postponement was recorded in the Daily Advertiser on Friday, 21 August. The Morning Chronicle on Tuesday, 25 August reported that London scored over 120, and Dartford 84. Dartford at one point were apparently 0/5. The remainder of the match was to be played out the same day (Tuesday), but no subsequent report was found. The ground's last historically important match was England v Chertsey on 15 September 1778. The result is unknown.

=== Later history to present day ===
On 15 September 1784, Vincenzo Lunardi flew a balloon from the Artillery Ground, the first such flight in England.

The venue is now used mainly for military exercises. Sport still has a presence, though, as it is also used by HAC teams for cricket in the summer, and for football and rugby matches in the winter. The rugby team is HAC RFC. Notably, the ground hosted a rugby union match between Saracens and the USA national team on 9 November 2010, which was won 20–6 by Saracens.

The ground is also, as a source of revenue for the HAC, rented out for parties and events. It serves as the start area for the annual Great City Race, a 5 km run through the streets of the City of London, which is just to the south of the venue.

== Bibliography ==
- ACS (1981). A Guide to Important Cricket Matches Played in the British Isles 1709–1863. Nottingham: ACS. OCLC 85045528.
- Altham, H. S.; Swanton, E. W. (1962). A History of Cricket, Volume 1 (to 1914) (5th ed.). London: George Allen & Unwin. OCLC 894274808.
- Buckley, G. B. (1935). Fresh Light on 18th Century Cricket. Birmingham: Cotterell & Co. OCLC 23450280.
- Maun, Ian (2009). From Commons to Lord's, Volume One: 1700 to 1750. Cambridge: Roger Heavens. ISBN 978-19-00592-52-9.
- Waghorn, H. T. (1899). Cricket Scores, Notes, &c. From 1730–1773. Edinburgh: Blackwood. OCLC 1086375331.
- Waghorn, H. T. (2005) [1906]. The Dawn of Cricket. London: J. W. McKenzie. ISBN 978-09-47821-17-3.
