= 1768 English cricket season =

Cricket season review

The 1768 English cricket season saw the death of William Bedle, the first great cricketer, and the rise to prominence of John Small, the greatest player of the 1760s and 1770s. The season has left the third scorecard of an important match, although it only provides batsmen's scores and team totals. Details are known of nine historically important matches. (Note: Any match listed in the ACS' Important Match Guide (1981) is historically important, and therefore of the highest standard, whether or not a scorecard might exist. The same applies to numerous matches discovered by researchers since 1981. For further information, see First-class cricket.)

== William Bedle ==
On Friday, 3 June, William Bedle died at his house near Dartford. He was 'near 90', and was 'formerly accounted the most expert cricket player in England'. Born in about 1678, he must have been in his prime during the first quarter of the 18th century. His death was reported by the Lloyd's Evening Post on Friday, 10 June.

== Bourne v Caterham ==
Bourne and Caterham played each other four times in 1768. The first match was 10 June on Westerham Common, and Caterham won by 14 runs. The Kentish Weekly Post of Saturday, 11 June recorded the teams and individual scores.

10 June 1768

Caterham	v	Bourne
63; Smailes 25, Carpenter 8 no bowling data recorded		60; Muddle 15, Will Palmer 12 no bowling data recorded
150; Foule 33, Henry Rowett 30 no bowling data recorded		139; Richard Simmons 45, Will Palmer 23 no bowling data recorded

Caterham won by 14 runs
Westerham Common, Surrey
Umpires: not known

- Toss not known
- The primary source refers to the Caterham club as "Westerham & Caterham", probably because of the venue.

This is the third time (and the first since 1744) that the individual scores in a significant match have survived. No details of dismissal were recorded.

The next two matches, both played in the Caterham area, were announced by the St James Chronicle on Saturday, 23 July. The newspaper referred to the teams as Mr Horatio Mann's Club (Bourne) and Mr Henry Rowett's Club (Caterham). Neither result has been found.

There was a fourth match on 12 August which was billed as Bourne v Surrey, though the Surrey team was probably Caterham again. The venue was Bishopsbourne Paddock, but the result is again unknown.

== Hampshire v Sussex ==
On 5 August, Hampshire played Sussex on Broadhalfpenny Down; the result is unknown. The match was referenced in a letter dated Wednesday, 27 July, from Sir Matthew Fetherstonhaugh of Uppark to Thomas Pelham-Holles, 1st Duke of Newcastle: 'I hear there is to be a great Cricket match play'd next Friday s'ennight upon Broad-halfpenny, about 7 miles West of this place in Hampshire & at wch. The Duke of Richmond & many from the Chichester Div. Of the County will be present, for it is a match made by the Duke (Sussex against Hampshire) with a Mr. Ridge near Warnford; at wch. Mr. Sackville is to play (for) Sussex'. (Note: The now archaic word s'ennight often occurs in 18th century writing. It is an abbreviation of 'seven nights' and means 'seven nights hence'. In this instance, Sir Matthew refers to a game taking place 'a week on Friday', in current parlance.)

The teams met again 10 September, also on Broadhalfpenny, and Hampshire won by 7 wickets. A report states: 'Last Monday another great match at cricket was played on Broad Halfpenny between eleven gentlemen of the county of Sussex, against eleven of the Hambledon Club, for a large sum, which was won by the latter, who had seven wickets to go down. Mr Small got above four score notches in this match, and was not out when the game was finished'. It is not known if Small scored his 80-plus runs in one innings, or if it was his match total.

== Hambledon v Kent ==
29 & 30 August : Hambledon v Kent on Broadhalfpenny Down. Hambledon won by 144 runs. This was reported in the Reading Mercury on Saturday, 3 September, as: 'Last Tuesday the second great match at cricket was played on Broad-Halfpenny between eleven gentlemen of the Hambledon Club against eleven gentlemen of the county of Kent for a considerable sum, which was won by the former by upwards of 100 notches; but what is very remarkable, one Mr Small, of Petersfield, fetched above seven score notches off his own bat'. Hambledon score 131 and 194, and Kent replied with 141 and 40, so Hambledon actually won by 144 runs—moreorless Small's contribution.

There is no confirmation, but Small may have scored cricket's earliest-known century in this game. The Mercury is ambiguous as it cannot be said for certain if his 140-plus was his match total, or his score in the second innings. Even if it was his match total, it remains possible that he scored a century in one innings, if he made 40 or less in the other.

== Single wicket ==
On Saturday, 28 May, the Kentish Weekly Post reported that 'last week in the Artillery Ground', a 'fives' game between the Hon. J. F. Sackville's team and Mr Horace Mann's team lasted two days. Sackville (soon to become 3rd Duke of Dorset) won by 4 wickets. The players and their individual scores are known. Mann's team of Bellchambers, John Boorman, James Fuggles, Thomas May, and Muddle scored 26 and 29; Sackville's team of Brobham, John Bayton, John Small, Birchett, and Mandy scored 20 and 36/1. May scored 10 and 12 for Mann, and Bayton of Hambledon scored 8 and 36* for Sackville, so Bayton's second innings decided the match. The more notable John Small scored only 3 and 0.

== Other events ==
Essex v London was arranged for Wednesday, 8 June on Epping Common but the London team did not appear, and forfeited their deposit.

The secondary sources have recorded three ladies' matches that took place in June between teams from Harting and Rogate in Sussex. These games attracted crowds of two to three thousand.

A match between Middlesex and Surrey, to be played 29 July in Stamford Hill, was pre-announced in Lloyd's Evening Post on Wednesday, 27 July. The stake was to be 100 guineas a side. No post-match report has been found.

== First mentions ==
=== Players ===
- John Bayton (Hampshire)
- Bellchambers (Surrey)
- Birchett (Caterham)
- Blake (Caterham)
- John Boorman (Kent/Essex)
- Brobham (Kent)
- Carpenter (Caterham)
- John Sackville, 3rd Duke of Dorset (Kent)
- Foule (Surrey)
- Edward Francis (Caterham)
- T. Francis (Caterham)
- James Fuggles (Kent)
- Golding (Bourne)
- Love (Bourne)
- Mandy (Kent)
- Richard May (Kent)
- Thomas May (Kent)
- Miller (Caterham)
- Muddle (Kent)
- Will Palmer (Kent/Surrey)
- Thomas Ridge (Hampshire)
- Richard Simmons (Kent)
- Smailes (Caterham)
- John Small (Hampshire)
- Twinker (Caterham)
- Ward (Bourne)

=== Venues ===
- Stamford Hill (unspecified)

== Bibliography ==
- ACS (1981). A Guide to Important Cricket Matches Played in the British Isles 1709–1863. Nottingham: ACS. OCLC 85045528.
- Buckley, G. B. (1935). Fresh Light on 18th Century Cricket. Birmingham: Cotterell & Co. OCLC 23450280.
- Buckley, G. B. (1937). Fresh Light on pre-Victorian Cricket. Birmingham: Cotterell & Co. OCLC 23469107.
- Maun, Ian (2011). From Commons to Lord's, Volume Two: 1751 to 1770. Leicester: Martin Wilson. ISBN 978-09-56906-60-1.
- McCann, Tim (2004). Sussex Cricket in the Eighteenth Century (PDF). Vol. 88. Lewes: West Sussex Record Office. ISBN 978-08-54450-55-8.
- Waghorn, H. T. (1899). Cricket Scores, Notes, &c. From 1730–1773. Edinburgh: Blackwood. OCLC 1086375331.
