= 1769 English cricket season =

Cricket season review

The 1769 English cricket season was the last in which the original London Cricket Club and the Artillery Ground feature prominently in the records. Details of eleven historically important matches are known. (Note: Any match listed in the ACS' Important Match Guide (1981) is historically important, and therefore of the highest standard, whether or not a scorecard might exist. The same applies to numerous matches discovered by researchers since 1981. For further information, see First-class cricket.)

The increasing stature of the Hambledon Club was encouraging a shift in focus from the Artillery Ground towards Broadhalfpenny Down, which became a major venue through the 1770s. The process may have been accelerated by Hambledon's innings victory over Surrey in September. The highlight of this match was one of the earliest known century partnerships, between Tom Sueter and George Leer of Hambledon, described by a contemporary reporter as 'remarkable'. Elsewhere, John Minshull scored the first definitely recorded century in the sport's history, albeit in a minor match.

== Kent v London ==
Kent and London played each other three times in August. The first match was in Blackheath, and Kent won by 47 runs. According to the Middlesex Journal: 'Greenwich, Woolwich and Deptford beat the Artillery Club of London by 47 notches'. The other two matches took place on the Artillery Ground. In the first of these, London won by 56 runs, and a report said: 'A great match at cricket was played in the Artillery Ground, for a very large sum of money (£20,000), and great bets depending, between eleven gentlemen of London and eleven of Kent : the match not being played out, they began again yesterday at two in the afternoon; when the Londoners beat by 56 notches'. The last match was played on Saturday, 26 August, and Kent won by 6 wickets.

== Hambledon v Caterham ==
The Hambledon and Caterham clubs met 29 June on Broadhalfpenny Down, and 31 July to 1 August at Guildford Bason. The result of the first is unknown, and Hambledon won the second by 4 wickets. A report of the game in the Reading Mercury on Saturday, 5 August reads: 'On Monday last began to be played at Guildford, in Surrey, the decisive grand match at cricket between the Hambledon and Caterham Clubs, which, after a long and vigorous contest, was determined on Tuesday evening in favour of the former. The utmost activity and skill in the game was displayed by each individual through the whole course of this match, but particularly the batting of Messrs Small and Bayton on the Hambledon team. There were near 20,000 spectators, and it is generally allowed by the best judges to have been the finest match that ever was played".

The Hambledon team was: Thomas Ridge, William Hogsflesh, Thomas Brett, Peter Stewart, Richard Nyren, John Small, John Bayton, Glazier, Tom Sueter, Purdy, and William Barber.

The Caterham team was: Henry Rowett, Bellchambers, Lumpy Stevens, Page, Joseph Miller, Smailes, John Wood, Will Palmer, Shepherd, Thomas Quiddington, and Wessing.

A report in the Whitehall Evening Post on Tuesday, 8 August states: 'Guildford. The benefit arising to this town by the last great match at Cricket has set many projections on foot for more sport of that sort. They talk of a match soon for £1,000 a side between a certain Duke against All England'. John Sackville had succeeded to his title as 3rd Duke of Dorset on 6 January 1769.

The Middlesex Journal, dated Thursday, 3 August, states: 'The afternoon of the first day was wet; the close of play scores were: Caterham, 104; Hambledon, 51 for 4'. As this was the 'decisive grand match', it leaves open the question of another one played betfore the 'first match' on 29 June, or between that match and this one.

On 28 September, Hambledon played Surrey on Broadhalfpenny Down. Hambledon won by an innings and 41 runs. It is possible that Surrey was Caterham again, because a newspaper report said: 'the second great match of cricket was played on Broad-halfpenny'. The reporter went on to say: 'What is very remarkable, the two first mates on the Hambledon team (Sueter and Leer) fetched 128 before they were parted'. This is the sport's second known century partnership, and the first in which the batters' names are known: Tom Sueter and George Leer.

== Berkshire v Surrey ==
Berkshire played their first eleven-a-side match as an individual county team on 8 June, when they hosted Surrey on Datchet Common. The match was reported by the St James Chronicle on Tuesday, 13 June. Surrey won by 6 runs.

== Duke of Dorset's XI v Wrotham ==
Although this was certainly a minor match, it has a place in cricket history because John Minshull, whose name was given as Minchin on the scoresheet, scored 107 for Dorset's XI in the second innings—the first century in any class of cricket that has definitely been recorded.

== Other events ==
On Monday, 8 May, a combined Caterham & Coulsdon team played against England at Smitham Bottom, Coulsdon; the result is unknown. The exact venue was to be a field belonging to the Red Lion at Smitham Bottom, and it was a Whitsuntide event.

The Middlesex Journal reported on Thursday, 6 July: 'Yesterday a Mr. Carter, a very eminent butcher of Grub Street, but of a corpulent body, was playing at Cricket in the Artillery Ground, making a stroke at the ball which he missed, he threw himself round with so great force that he broke his knee pan (knee cap). He was carried home, with little hope of ever recovering the use of his leg again'.

On Thursday, 20 July, a report in the Whitehall Evening Post said: 'Nothing can exceed the vogue that Cricket has in some parts of Surrey and Hampshire: the people are so fond of it that it is common for them to ride 40 miles to be mere spectators at a Cricket match. A few days ago 22 expert players played a match not far from Godalming when each team got the same number of notches at both innings, which was esteemed very extraordinary'.

The Reading Mercury published a letter from 'An old Cricket Player' on Monday, 24 July, concerning: 'A Reading v. Sonning match on Bulmarsh Heath on Fri., 21 July, complaining of the latter's unfair tactics. Sonning batted first and made 86: Reading then made 187, sacrificing their last five wickets: Sonning then made 125 which put them 24 ahead. There had been a bet between a player on each team on their total individual scores. The Sonning player made 9 the first innings, and between 60 & 70 the second : the Reading player having made 41 the first innings could not exceed the other's total as only 25 runs were wanted to win the match. There was a dispute over that, but finally the Reading player agreed to go in for the game. Sonning at first refused to play or to pay the money, although there was nearly an hour to go; they finally went into the held, and "by throwing the ball about, out of the way" so delayed the game that it could not be played out'.

On Tuesday, 1 August, the Whitehall Evening Post reported: 'We are informed that the great match at Cricket, which has been so long in agitation, will be decided one day next week on the downs at Calais. On this match near £5,000 is depending : the players are to be all English men'.

Middlesex played London in Stanmore on Saturday, 26 August. The Bath Chronicle reported this on Thursday, 31 August, and said: 'London beat Middlesex for 50 guineas'.

West Kent were to play Surrey on Friday, 22 September, at Sevenoaks Vine. It was announced the previous day in the St James Chronicle, but no post-match report has been found. West Kent was then the Duke of Dorset's team.

== First mentions ==
=== Clubs and teams ===
- Berkshire
- Caterham & Coulsdon
- Duke of Dorset's XI
- Wrotham

=== Players ===
- William Barber (Hambledon/Hampshire)
- S. Bartram (Duke of Dorset's XI)
- Bishop (Dorset's XI)
- William Bowra (Kent/Dorset's XI)
- Thomas Brett (Hambledon/Hampshire)
- Jasper Fish (Kent/Dorset's XI)
- Glazier (Hambledon/Hampshire)
- William Hogsflesh (Hambledon/Hampshire)
- George Leer (Hambledon/Hampshire)
- Joseph Miller (Kent/Dorset's XI)
- John Minshull (Kent/Dorset's XI)
- Richard Nyren (Hambledon/Hampshire)
- Oliver (Dorset's XI)
- Page (Chertsey/Surrey)
- Thomas Pattenden (Kent/Dorset's XI)
- Purdy (Hambledon/Hampshire)
- Thomas Quiddington (Chertsey/Surrey)
- Shearcy (Dorset's XI)
- Shepherd (Chertsey/Surrey)
- Lumpy Stevens (Chertsey/Surrey)
- Tom Sueter (Hambledon/Hampshire)
- Wessing (Chertsey/Surrey)
- Whiting (Dorset's XI)
- John Wood (Kent/Dorset's XI)
- John Wood (Chertsey/Surrey)

=== Venues ===
- Guildford Bason
- Stanmore (unspecified)

== Bibliography ==
- ACS (1981). A Guide to Important Cricket Matches Played in the British Isles 1709–1863. Nottingham: ACS. OCLC 85045528.
- Bowen, Rowland (1970). Cricket: A History of its Growth and Development. London: Eyre & Spottiswoode. ISBN 978-04-13278-60-9.
- Buckley, G. B. (1935). Fresh Light on 18th Century Cricket. Birmingham: Cotterell & Co. OCLC 23450280.
- Maun, Ian (2011). From Commons to Lord's, Volume Two: 1751 to 1770. Leicester: Martin Wilson. ISBN 978-09-56906-60-1.
- Waghorn, H. T. (1899). Cricket Scores, Notes, &c. From 1730–1773. Edinburgh: Blackwood. OCLC 1086375331.
- Waghorn, H. T. (2005) [1906]. The Dawn of Cricket. London: J. W. McKenzie. ISBN 978-09-47821-17-3.
