= 1772 English cricket season =

Cricket season review

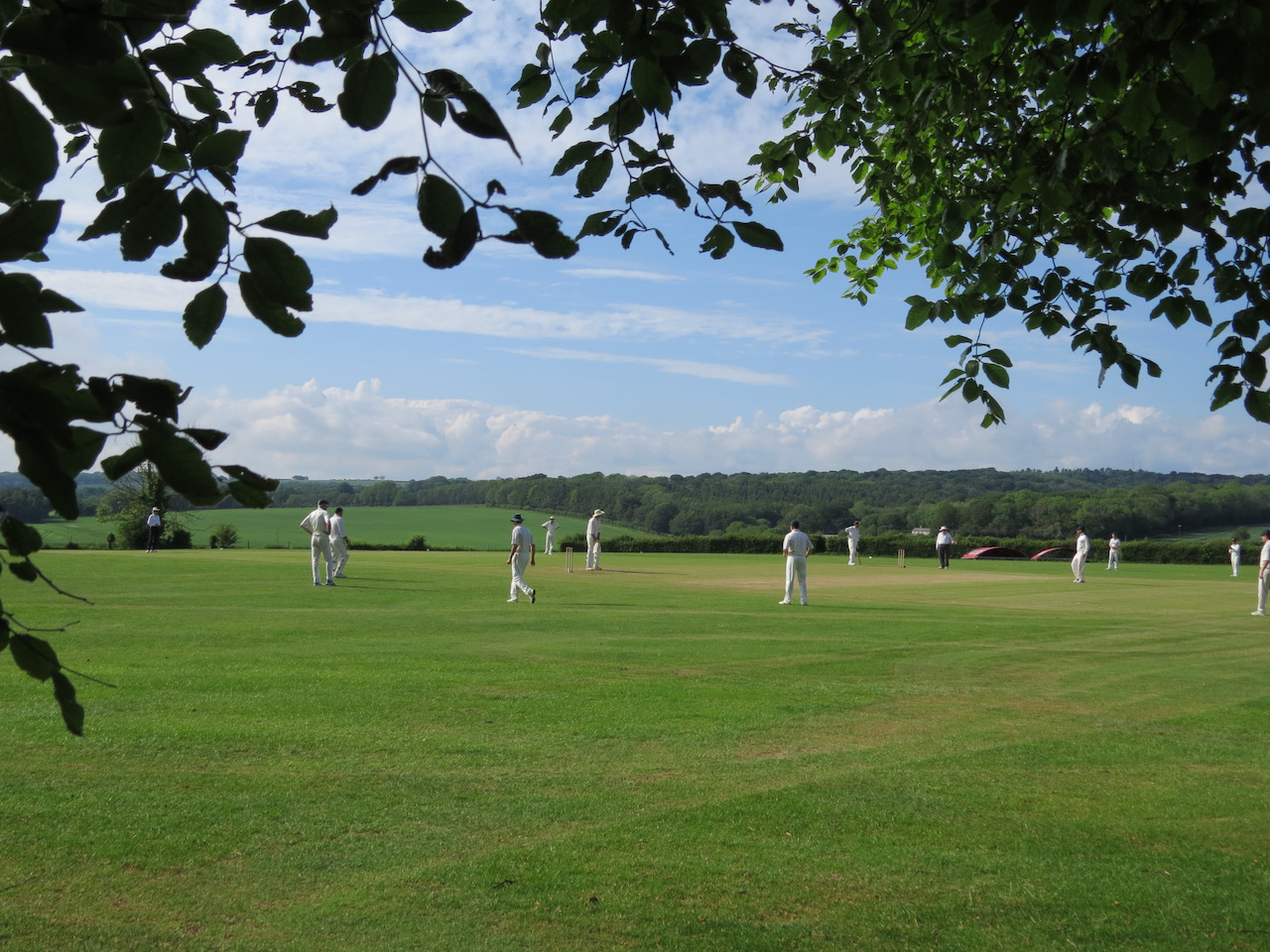
Broadhalfpenny Down, venue of Hampshire's first match against England in 1772.

In the 1772 English cricket season, it became normal practice to complete match scorecards and there are surviving examples from every subsequent season. Scorecards from 1772 have been found for three historically important eleven-a-side matches in which the Hampshire county team played against an England team, and for one single wicket match between Kent and Hampshire. Prior to 1772, only four scorecards have survived, the last from a minor match in 1769. (Note: Any match listed in the ACS' Important Match Guide (1981) is historically important, and therefore of the highest standard, whether or not a scorecard might exist. The same applies to numerous matches discovered by researchers since 1981. For further information, see First-class cricket.)

Hampshire won two and lost one of their matches against England. Kent won the single wicket match. Hampshire were organised by the Hambledon Club and played their home matches on Broadhalfpenny Down, near the village of Hambledon, Hampshire.

While details are scarce, reports exist of four other eleven-a-side matches. Two involved a combined Hampshire & Sussex team playing against Kent and it has been suggested that Hambledon may have been a two counties club. There was a match between Surrey and Hampshire of which only the result is known. In the north of England, the Sheffield and Nottingham clubs met at an unknown venue in Sheffield.

== Scorecards ==
The earliest known scorecards were created for two matches in 1744 but, before 1772, only two more have been found – one each from minor matches played in 1751 and 1769. Three scorecards exist from important matches played in 1772, when completion became normal practice, and there are surviving cards from every subsequent season.

=== Hampshire v England, Broadhalfpenny Down, 24–25 June ===
In the match at Broadhalfpenny Down on 24–25 June, Hampshire won by 53 runs for a stake of 500 guineas. Hampshire were organised by the Hambledon Club and one source for this match has called the team Hambledon while, in other accounts, England has been called "Kent, Middlesex and Surrey".

24–25 June 1772
Scorecard

Hampshire	v	England
146; John Small 78; Edward Aburrow Jr 27 no bowling data recorded		109; Thomas White 35; John Minchin 16 no bowling data recorded
79; John Small 34; Peter Stewart 11 no bowling data recorded		63; Tom May 18; James Fuggles 12 no bowling data recorded

Hampshire won by 53 runs
Broadhalfpenny Down, Hambledon, Hampshire
Umpires: not known

- Toss not known
- The scorecard provides no details other than batsmen's scores and team totals. No extras were recorded.

Hampshire had two given men: William Yalden and John Edmeads, both of Surrey. Yalden was a noted wicket-keeper and Hampshire's regular keeper Tom Sueter was also playing, but it is not known which of them kept wicket in this match. On the England team, Edward Gill was a recognised wicket-keeper. Hampshire batsman John Small's score of 78 is the highest recorded in the 1772 season and, as such, it established the record for the highest individual score definitely recorded in a senior or important match. According to contemporary newspaper reports, "bets of £500 were laid against John Minshull in favour of John Small".

=== England v Hampshire, Guildford Bason, 23–24 July ===
The match at Guildford Bason on 23–24 July was also won by Hampshire, this time by 62 runs and again for a stake of 500 guineas. Richard Simmons of Kent was the England wicket-keeper in this match and the next one.

23–24 July 1772
Scorecard

Hampshire	v	England
152; William Yalden 68; Tom Sueter 21 no bowling data recorded		126; Joseph Miller 30; Richard Simmons 27 no bowling data recorded
122; William Yalden 49; John Small 30 no bowling data recorded		86; Joseph Miller 26; John Minchin 13 no bowling data recorded

Hampshire won by 62 runs
Guildford Bason, Surrey
Umpires: not known

- Toss not known
- The scorecard provides no details other than batsmen's scores and team totals, which include the extras.

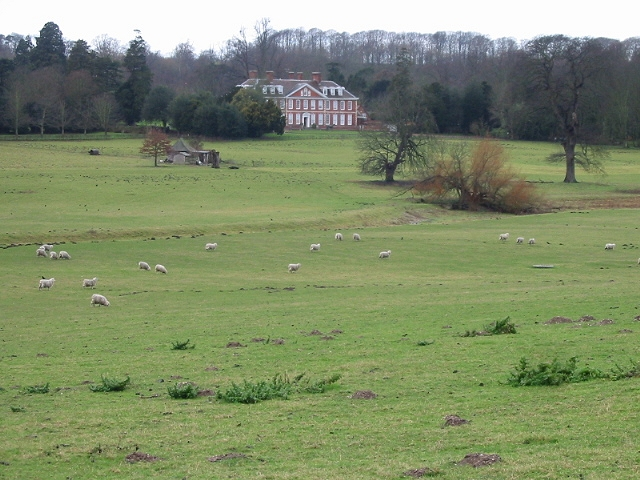
Bourne Park House at Bishopsbourne in Kent.

F. S. Ashley-Cooper calls the teams Hambledon and All England when referring to confusion about the extras: "In the course of the game, the Hambledon Club (sic) got 11 notches in byes and England 21, but they were not entered in the scoresheet". He gave the match scores as 144 and 118 to 117 and 73 with Hampshire winning by 72 runs; however, these totals have Hampshire scoring 12 byes and England scoring 22, which is the same as the scorecard (the margin excluding extras is correct).

=== England v Hampshire, Bishopsbourne Paddock, 19–20 August ===
The third match was played on 19–20 August at Bishopsbourne Paddock, Bishopsbourne, near Canterbury. England won by two wickets and the scorecard shows that Joseph Miller and John Boorman were the not out batsmen when the match ended, while Dick May did not bat. Yalden and Edmeads again played for Hampshire as given men. Hampshire's captain, all-rounder Richard Nyren, missed this match and was replaced by Thomas Ridge.

19–20 August 1772
Scorecard

Hampshire	v	England
123; George Leer 29; Tom Sueter 26 no bowling data recorded		136; William Palmer 30; John Minchin 24 no bowling data recorded
113; John Small 48; Peter Stewart 12 no bowling data recorded		101/8; John Wood 20; Joseph Miller 17 not out no bowling data recorded

England won by 2 wickets
Bishopsbourne Paddock, Bishopsbourne, Kent
Umpires: not known

- Toss not known
- The scorecard provides no details other than batsmen's scores and team totals, which include the extras.

Arthur Haygarth noted that England in this match was called Kent in another account, though he called it England; the team included nine Kent players with Lumpy Stevens and Thomas White from Surrey.

== Single wicket ==
A five-a-side match was played under single wicket rules at the Artillery Ground on Tuesday, 2 June between teams representing Hampshire and Kent. It was a two–innings match. Hampshire scored 11 and 46; Kent scored 35 and 23 for 4 wickets to win by one wicket. The Kent players were John Boorman, John Frame, Dick May, John Minshull, and Joseph Miller. Minshull scored 26 and 11; Frame scored the winning run. The Hampshire players were John Small, Tom Sueter, George Leer, Thomas Brett, and Richard Nyren. Nyren scored 29 out of 46 in the second innings.

== Other events ==
Besides the scorecards of the three matches above, reports have survived of four more eleven-a-side matches in 1772.

After their first known meeting in 1771, the Sheffield and Nottingham clubs played a match on Monday, 1 June at an unknown location in Sheffield. Nottingham conceded defeat after being dismissed for 14 and then seeing Sheffield score 70 with wickets still in hand. A pre-match announcement appeared in the (Nottingham) Daily Messenger on Tuesday, 25 May, and the paper followed up with a report on Friday, 12 June.

In August, Kent played two matches against a combined Hampshire & Sussex team. (Note: The teams raised by the Hambledon Club for the matches on 10–11 and 26–27 August are believed to have been representative of both Hampshire and Sussex; the latter is rarely mentioned as a county team during the "Hambledon Era".) The first, on 10–11 August, was at Broadhalfpenny Down and the combined team won by 50 runs. The stake was 500 guineas but, apart from the result, no details of the match are known. The second match, on 26–27 August, was played at Guildford Bason and Kent won by innings and 29 runs. In his notes about this match, G. B. Buckley says: 'Hampshire & Sussex = Hambledon Club', adding weight to the theory that Hambledon was a two counties club. The bets placed seem to have been mainly around how many runs the Duke of Dorset would score compared with one Mr Ellis, a now unknown player. It is possible that this was a "gentlemen only" match and the same may be true of the match on 10 August. The report was in the General Evening Post on Saturday, 29 August.

On Friday, 28 August, there was a Surrey v Hampshire match at Guildford Bason which Hampshire won by 45 runs. No details are known except the result.

In June, Chatham lost by 20 runs to Meopham at George Louch's "cricketing field" in Chatham.

Two matches in June involved the Blackheath club against teams designated as counties but, as Buckley says, "the alleged (Kent team) cannot have been representative" and they are minor matches only. Another Kent match against a team called London and Middlesex apparently took place at the Artillery Ground on Tuesday, 11 August, the same day as the Hampshire & Sussex v Kent match above. It is believed that this was not a representative match, especially given the stakes on offer at Hambledon.

== First mentions ==
=== Clubs and teams ===
- Hampshire & Sussex
- Meopham

=== Players ===
- Edward Aburrow Jr (Hampshire)
- Childs (Surrey)
- (Mr) Ellis (Hampshire & Sussex)
- William Yalden (Surrey)

== Bibliography ==
- ACS (1981). A Guide to Important Cricket Matches Played in the British Isles 1709–1863. Nottingham: ACS. OCLC 85045528.
- Ashley-Cooper, F. S. (1924). Hambledon Cricket Chronicle: 1772–1796. London: Jenkins. OCLC 38498574.
- Bowen, Rowland (1970). Cricket: A History of its Growth and Development. London: Eyre & Spottiswoode. ISBN 978-04-13278-60-9.
- Buckley, G. B. (1935). Fresh Light on 18th Century Cricket. Birmingham: Cotterell & Co. OCLC 23450280.
- Buckley, G. B. (1937). Fresh Light on pre-Victorian Cricket. Birmingham: Cotterell & Co. OCLC 23469107.
- Haygarth, Arthur (1996) [1862]. Scores & Biographies, Volume 1 (1744–1826). Kennington: Frederick Lillywhite. ISBN 978-19-00592-23-9.
- Waghorn, H. T. (1899). Cricket Scores, Notes, &c. From 1730–1773. Edinburgh: Blackwood. OCLC 1086375331.
- Waghorn, H. T. (2005) [1906]. The Dawn of Cricket. London: J. W. McKenzie. ISBN 978-09-47821-17-3.
