= 1773 English cricket season =

Cricket season review

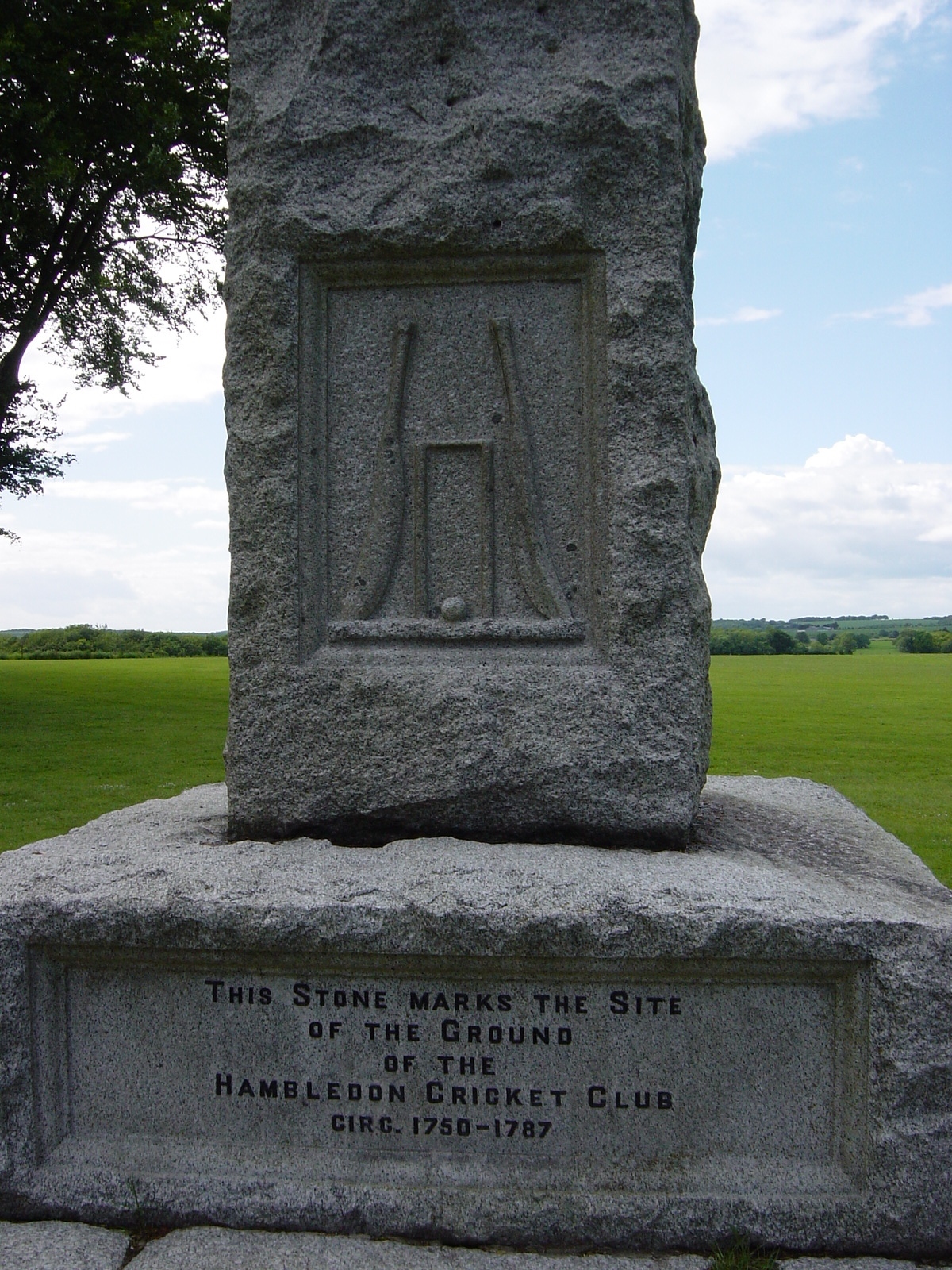
1773 was a bad year for Hambledon

In the 1773 English cricket season, there was a downturn in the fortunes of the Hambledon Club as their Hampshire team lost every match they are known to have played, and some of their defeats were heavy. Their poor results owed much to star bowler Thomas Brett having been injured. Three other county teams were active: Kent, Middlesex and Surrey. England teams took part in five matches, all against Hampshire, and won all five. A total of fourteen historically important matches are in the records. (Note: Any match listed in the ACS' Important Match Guide (1981) is historically important, and therefore of the highest standard, whether or not a scorecard might exist. The same applies to numerous matches discovered by researchers since 1981. For further information, see First-class cricket.)

William Yalden was one of the season's leading wicket-keepers, and he also equalled Richard Newland's record for the highest individual innings in a senior match when he scored 88 for Surrey against Hampshire in September.

== Single wicket ==
The earliest significant event of the season was a single wicket match played on 2 June at the Artillery Ground between Five of England and Five of Hampshire for a stake of £1,000. It was billed as 'the first great match this season'. Hampshire's five were John Small, Tom Sueter, Richard Nyren, George Leer, and Thomas Brett. England's five were Lumpy Stevens, John Minshull, Joseph Miller, Dick May, and Will Palmer. England scored 31 & 27/4 against Hampshire's 24 & 33 to win by 1 wicket. Miller was 11 not out at the end, and so scored the winning run(s). Leer with scores of 16 and 13 made the most runs.

== Eleven-a-side ==
The Association of Cricket Statisticians and Historians (the ACS) listed twelve senior eleven-a-side matches in the 1773 English cricket season. A thirteenth match, which they had overlooked, was played on 9–10 July. The combined Hampshire and Sussex team underwritten by the Hambledon Club took part in eight matches – five against England and three against Surrey – and lost all of them. Surrey played in all the other five matches, four against Kent and one against Middlesex. Surrey defeated Kent three times and lost to them once; they also lost the Middlesex match.

=== Hampshire v England ===
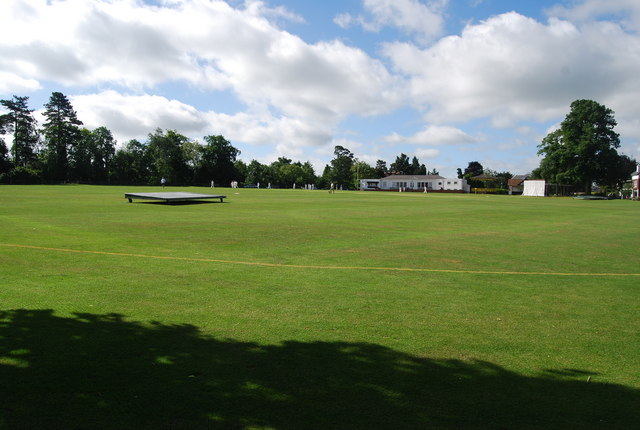
Sevenoaks Vine today

The first match between Hampshire and England took place at Sevenoaks Vine on 28–29 June. England was a strong Kent and Surrey combination. The surviving scorecard is the first since 1744 to include some bowling and fielding details, though no credit was given to the bowler when a batsman was out other than by being clean bowled, a constraint in scoring that was not rectified until well into the 19th century. In this match, Lumpy Stevens may have been the best bowler as he took five wickets bowled, and possibly had more from catches. Hampshire batted first and were all out for 77. England totalled 177 in reply to establish a first innings lead of 100; Joseph Miller scored 73. In their second innings, Hampshire were dismissed for only 49 and so England won by an innings & 51 runs. The scorecard includes the first known instance of hit wicket as a means of dismissal, but it is not mentioned again until 1786. The batsman in this case was John Minshull, and it was another 'first' for him as he scored cricket's earliest recorded century in 1769.

There was a return match at the Artillery Ground on 2–3 July. John Small scored 58 in Hampshire's first innings total of 132. England replied with 187 to take a first innings lead of 55. Hampshire then scored 154 and England made 100/4 to win by 6 wickets. Coulsdon batsman Will Palmer, who had an outstanding season in 1773, scored 52* and 30* in the two England innings.

The two teams met at the Artillery Ground again a week later, on 9–10 July. This match is not included in the ACS list but Martin Wilson in his Index to Waghorn explains the situation, based on H. T. Waghorn's source, that it is an extra match which had previously been overlooked. Waghorn's source reported that England won by 2 wickets, but Hampshire were handicapped because Thomas Brett was injured.

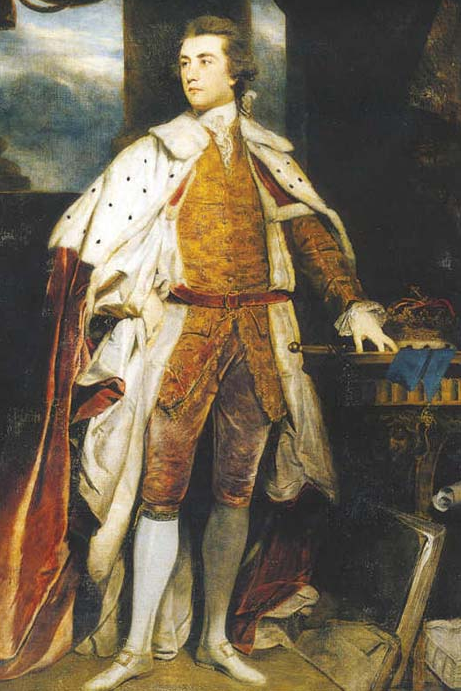
John Sackville, 3rd Duke of Dorset

Two days later, England and Hampshire played again, this time at Laleham Burway in Chertsey, and England won by the convincing margin of 114 runs. No scorecard has been found but there was a report in the Morning Post on 16 July which said: 'Hampshire being beat again last Tuesday on Laleham Burway they must now resign the Cricket laurel, though much against their will'. The report went on to say how the Hampshire fielders had crowded the Duke of Dorset, who was scoring well with shots to the off-side, thereby preventing him from making a full play at the ball. This practice actually contravened the 1744 Laws of Cricket which stated that 'in the case of hindrance (the umpires) may order a notch (run) to be scored'. Although Dorset could presumably have appealed to the umpires, he dealt with the matter as a batsman. He asked the fielders to stand back and they refused, so he played his shot fully and 'in so doing brought one of the gentlemen to the ground'.

The last match between the two was played at Broadhalfpenny Down on 4–5 August and England won by 9 wickets. Hampshire were all out for 89 and 140 with Stevens bowling seven and Dorset bowling six. In England's first innings, Thomas White scored 69 and Palmer 68 in a total of 202. England scored 28/1 in their second innings to complete their fifth win of the season over Hampshire.

=== Hampshire v Surrey ===
The Hampshire v Surrey matches were played towards the end of the season, the first on 26 August at Broadhalfpenny Down. Hampshire scored 103 and 51; Surrey replied with 131 and 24/4 to win by 6 wickets. The top score in the match was 35 by Richard Francis of Surrey in the first innings. No bowling or fielding details were recorded.

In Scores & Biographies (S&B), Arthur Haygarth states that the details were obtained from the Hampshire Chronicle as the match was not included in the 'old printed book of Hambledon scores from 1772 to 1784'. S&B goes on to regret the absences of John Small and Thomas Brett, the best batsman and best bowler respectively of Hampshire. He says Hampshire fielded almost a 'scratch team' as there were four debutants Cotton, Horne, Lawrence, and M. Lewis who do not appear again in recorded scores. Some or all of them may have been active before 1772. Strictly speaking, Hampshire in this game was Hambledon Parish. Some regular players who lived elsewhere in the county, including Small and Brett, did not play.

The second match was played 16–18 September at Laleham Burway, and Surrey won by 8 wickets. Hampshire were dismissed for only 38 in their first innings. The third match was at Broadhalfpenny Down on 27–28 September, and Surrey won convincingly by an innings and 60 runs. Hampshire were dismissed for 83 and 82. Both these totals were less than William Yalden's 88 in Surrey's innings of 225. Yalden's score was the highest in 1773, and it equalled the known record for the highest individual innings in a senior match; Richard Newland scored 88 playing for England against Kent in 1745.

=== Kent v Surrey ===
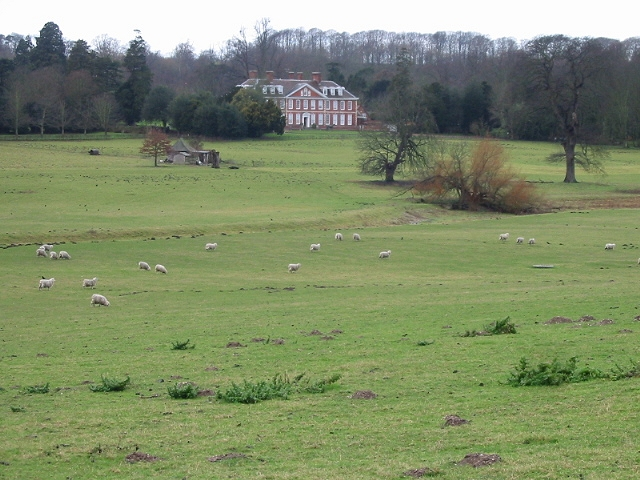
Bourne Park House with sheep grazing where Bishopsbourne Paddock was once sited

Kent and Surrey played each other four times – twice at Laleham Burway, once at Bishopsbourne Paddock, and once at Sevenoaks Vine. Surrey won the first three matches, and Kent won at Sevenoaks. The first match was at Laleham Burway on 21–22 June, and Surrey won by 35 runs after scoring 175 and 70, while dismissing Kent for 133 and 77. Thomas White made scores of 44 and 23 for Surrey. No bowling or fielding details were recorded.

The second match at Bishopsbourne on 19–21 July is the first in which close of play scores are included in the scorecard. The match was interrupted by rain. On the first day, a Monday, Surrey were all out for 77 and Kent were 55/5 at the close. On Tuesday, Kent added only eight more runs and were dismissed for 63. Surrey started their second innings but, with rain intervening, had made only 65/2 by the close. The match was completed on the Wednesday with Thomas White going on from 2* overnight to 60. Surrey's total was 217. Bowlers John Wood and Lumpy Stevens dismissed Kent for 78 to ensure a Surrey victory by 153 runs.

No scorecard has been found for the third match at Laleham Burway on 9–10 August. A report says the stake was 500 guineas per side, and Surrey won by 8 wickets. The fourth match was played 16–18 August on Sevenoaks Vine, and Kent won by 6 wickets. Thomas White made another good score with 59, but was on the losing team this time.

=== Surrey v Middlesex ===
Surrey met Middlesex at Kennington Common on 13 July. No scorecard has been found. The stakes were 100 guineas a side and Middlesex won by 6 runs having a match total of 179 to Surrey's 173.

== Other events ==
On 30 July, there was a match at Bishopsbourne Paddock between Bourne and Chatham for which a grandstand was erected. It was rained off not long after it began; Bourne had scored 56/8 in their first innings. The Bourne team included Joseph Miller, Will Palmer, James Fuggles, Richard Simmons and one of the May brothers, as well as the team's patron Sir Horatio Mann himself. The Chatham team included Robert Clifford and George Louch. In the report of an earlier Chatham match, Louch was 'admired for his activity in the field'; he had a reputation as one of the best fielders in England.

Also on 30 July, there was a match at Broadhalfpenny Down between Hambledon Town and Hampshire, which was played for 20 guineas a side. It is included in the ACS list, but perhaps for historical interest only.

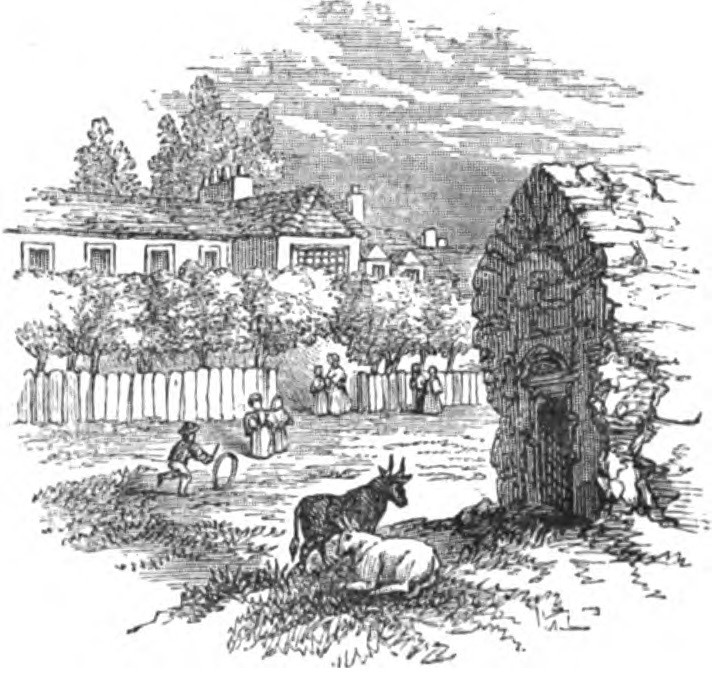
White Conduit House, and the conduit head above White Conduit Fields

On 5 August, there was a London v Gentlemen of England match on White Conduit Fields. The Middlesex Journal reported in its edition of Saturday, 7 August that London won 'with great ease'.

On 16–18 August, there was a match at Tothill Fields between Westminster and London. Shock White of Brentford played for Westminster as a given man. There has been some confusion in sources between this player and Thomas White of Reigate, but Shock's appearance at Tothill Fields coincides with Thomas playing for Surrey against Kent in Sevenoaks on the same dates (see above), thus confirming that they were two different people.

There was a return match between Chatham and Bourne on 30 August on the Chatham Lines. It ended in a draw. They played again at Bishopsbourne Paddock in September, and Bourne won by 3 wickets.

A match was scheduled at Andover on 24–25 September between Sussex and Hampshire. Sussex were due to have Lumpy Stevens and Thomas White of Surrey as given men; and also John Bayton, the noted Hambledon batsman of the 1760s, though he may have been a native of Sussex. The match was cancelled because only seven of Sussex turned up. Apart from the afore-mentioned three players, Sussex was by no means top-class. Hampshire, on the other hand, had selected Davis, Aylward, Small, Sueter, Leer, Nyren, Stewart, Brett, Purchase, Barber, and Hogsflesh.

== First mentions ==
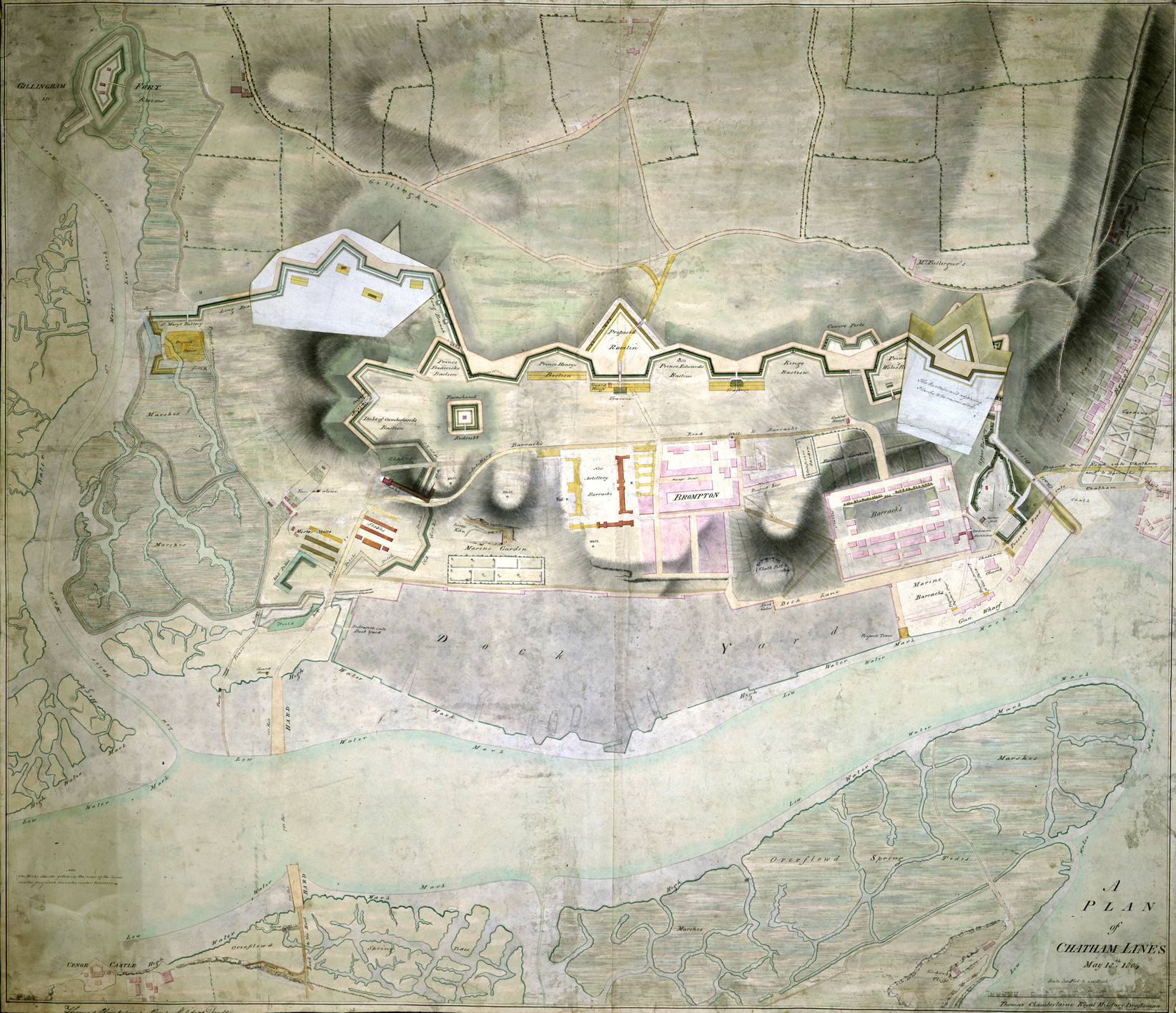
Plan of Chatham Lines, dated 1804

=== Players ===
- Henry Attfield (Surrey)
- James Aylward (Hampshire)
- Francis Booker (Kent)
- William Bullen (Kent)
- Samuel Colchin (Kent)
- Richard Francis (Surrey/Hampshire)
- Edward Hussey (Kent)
- George Louch (Kent/MCC)
- Richard Purchase (Hampshire)
- Charles Bennet, 4th Earl of Tankerville (Surrey)

=== Venues ===
- Chatham Lines

== Bibliography ==
- ACS (1981). A Guide to Important Cricket Matches Played in the British Isles 1709–1863. Nottingham: ACS. OCLC 85045528.
- Ashley-Cooper, F. S. (1924). Hambledon Cricket Chronicle: 1772–1796. London: Jenkins. OCLC 38498574.
- Buckley, G. B. (1935). Fresh Light on 18th Century Cricket. Birmingham: Cotterell & Co. OCLC 23450280.
- Haygarth, Arthur (1996) [1862]. Scores & Biographies, Volume 1 (1744–1826). Kennington: Frederick Lillywhite. ISBN 978-19-00592-23-9.
- Maun, Ian (2009). From Commons to Lord's, Volume One: 1700 to 1750. Cambridge: Roger Heavens. ISBN 978-19-00592-52-9.
- Waghorn, H. T. (1899). Cricket Scores, Notes, &c. From 1730–1773. Edinburgh: Blackwood. OCLC 1086375331.
- Waghorn, H. T. (2005) [1906]. The Dawn of Cricket. London: J. W. McKenzie. ISBN 978-09-47821-17-3.
- Wilson, Martin (2005). An Index to Waghorn. London: Bodyline Books (limited edition, by subscription only).
