= Will Palmer (cricketer) =

English cricketer (1736–1790)

Personal information
- Full name: William Palmer
- Born: 1737; Coulsdon, Surrey
- Died: February 1790 (aged 52–53); Coulsdon
- Role: Batsman

Domestic team information
- Years: Team
- ?–1784: Coulsdon Cricket Club
- 1768–1769: Caterham Cricket Club
- 1772–1773: England
- 1773–1776: Surrey
- 1776: Kent
- Source: CricketArchive, 20 September 2022

William Palmer (1737 – February 1790) was an English cricketer who played during the 1760s and 1770s. He was born and died in Coulsdon, Surrey. As a top-order batsman, he was a member of the local Coulsdon Cricket Club and also played county cricket for Surrey. Most of Palmer's career was before cricket's statistical record began in the 1772 season so relatively little is known of him. However, he regularly played in historically important matches until 1776. (Note: Any match listed in the ACS' Important Match Guide (1981) is historically important, and therefore of the highest standard, whether or not a scorecard might exist. The same applies to numerous matches discovered by researchers since 1981. For further information, see First-class cricket.)

Palmer has been recorded in 24 eleven-a-side matches, and in one single wicket match. He was last recorded playing for Coulsdon against Chertsey in 1784 when he was 47 years old.

== Career ==
=== 1768 to 1772 ===
Will Palmer was born at Coulsdon, Surrey, in 1737 and christened on 7 January that year (Julian calendar). He was already 31 years old when he played for Bourne Cricket Club against Caterham Cricket Club at Westerham Common on 10 June 1768. The match is the earliest known mention of him in cricket sources. Caterham batted first and were all out for 63 but Bourne were dismissed for 60 in their first innings, Palmer scoring 12. In their second innings, Caterham totalled 150 for a match total of 213, so Bourne needed 154 to win. Palmer scored 23, which was the second-highest score after Richard Simmons' 45, but Bourne were all out for 139 and Caterham won the match by 14 runs. As Palmer was a Surrey man, it is possible that he played for Bourne as a given man. This match is not included in the ACS guide.

In 1769, Palmer played for Caterham against Hambledon at Guildford Bason on 31 July and 1 August. The team totals are known but there are no individual scores or details of dismissals. Caterham scored 104 and 137. Hambledon replied with 99 and 143/6 to win by 4 wickets. The match was originally recorded by H. T. Waghorn but with some transcription errors. The report found by Waghorn described the match as "the finest that ever was played" and calculated an attendance of 20,000. G. B. Buckley discovered an additional report which mentioned that the first day's play was interrupted by rain and that Hambledon in their first innings had scored 51/4 at the close. According to CricketArchive, however, the match was played in 1768 and Hambledon won by 86 runs after scoring 137 and 142 while Caterham (who batted first and third in reality) replied with 104 and 99. Hambledon's match total by the database's reckoning was 279 and Caterham's was 203, a difference of 76, not 86. Furthermore, CricketArchive calls the match "Surrey v Hampshire". In the ACS guide, the match is correctly dated and called "Caterham v Hambledon".

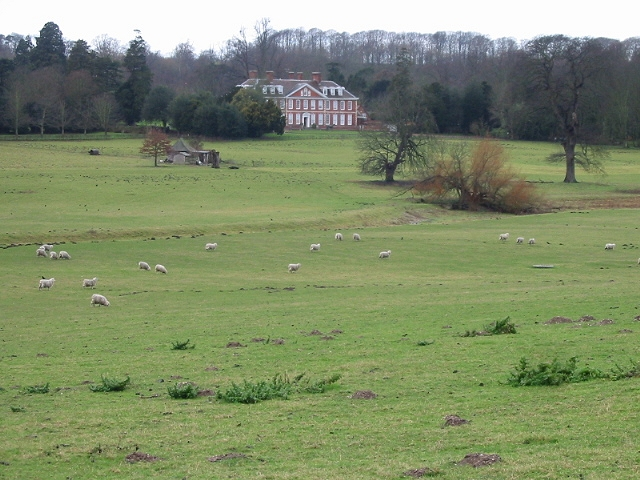
Bourne Park House at Bishopsbourne

There is no mention of Palmer in reports from the 1770 and 1771 seasons. In 1772, he played in two matches for an England against Hampshire. The first was at Broadhalfpenny Down on 23–25 June; the second at Bishopsbourne Paddock on 19–20 August. Although Palmer's team was called England by some sources, others called it Kent, Middlesex and Surrey, as the players were from those counties only. In the first match, Hampshire (146 and 79) defeated England (109 and 63) by 53 runs, Palmer scoring 13 and 8. At Bourne Park, England won by 2 wickets. Hampshire were all out for 123 and England replied with 136. Palmer top-scored with 29. Hampshire scored 113 in their second innings. Palmer scored 14 as England made 101/8 to win by 2 wickets. The result of this match gave cause for celebration in Kent as most of England's players were from Kent. A song was written by a Kent supporter which named all the England players in one quatrain:

Minshull, Miller, and Palmer, with Lumpy and May,
Fresh laurels have gained by their conquest to day;
Wood, Pattenden, Simmons, with Fuggles and White,
With Boorman we'll join and we'll toast them all night.

=== 1773 ===
1773 was the best of Palmer's known seasons. He appeared in eight noted eleven-a-side matches and in one single wicket match. The latter was played on 2 June at the Artillery Ground between Five of Hambledon and Five of England, including Palmer. It was a low-scoring match which England won by 1 wicket. Palmer was dismissed for 1 in both innings. He made his first known appearance for Surrey at Laleham Burway on 21–22 June in a match against Kent. He scored 8 and 5 as Surrey won by 35 runs.

Palmer then had an outstanding match on 2–3 July at the Artillery Ground as England defeated Hampshire by 6 wickets. Hampshire batted first and were all out for 132. England replied with 187, of which Palmer scored 52 not out, a first innings lead of 55. Hampshire scored 154 in the second innings. Palmer with 30 not out and John Boorman with 55 led England to victory at 100/4. Palmer had a match total of 82 and was not out in both innings.

On 19–21 July, Palmer was in the Surrey which defeated Kent by 153 runs at Bishopsbourne Paddock. He top-scored in the first innings with 22 in a total of 77. Kent were all out for 63. Surrey built on their lead and scored 217 in the second innings, Palmer contributing 38. Kent were bowled out for 78. As happened in Kent the previous year, a song was written to celebrate Surrey's victory. The writer was the Rev. J. Duncombe of Sevenoaks. It was called Surrey Triumphant and was a parody of The Ballad of Chevy Chase. Several players were mentioned and one of the verses was: "Palmer, for batting well esteemed".

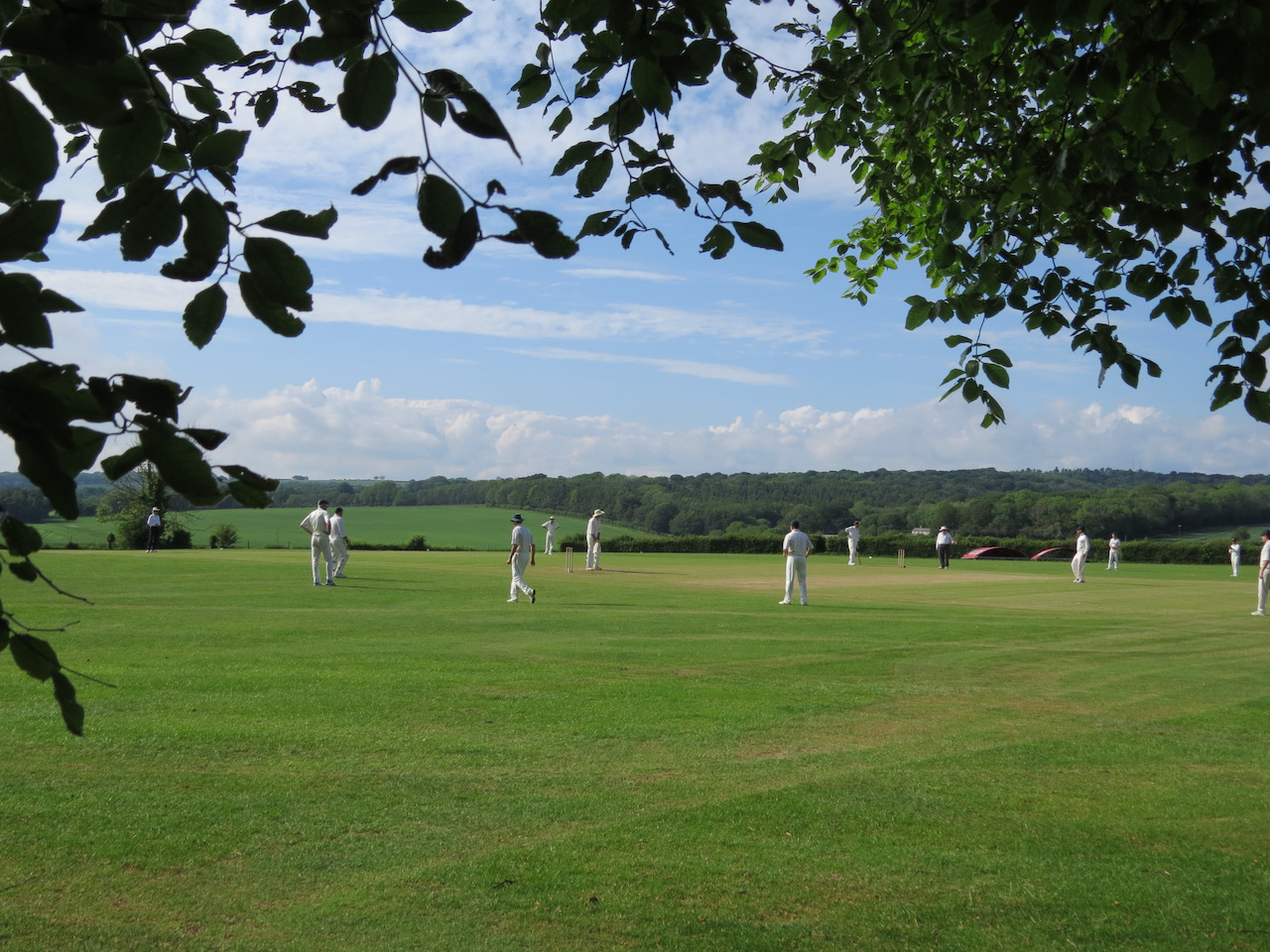
Palmer made his highest known score at Broadhalfpenny Down

In his next match, Palmer made the highest-known score of his career when he scored 68 for England against Hampshire at Broadhalfpenny Down on 4–5 August. At the time, it was one of the highest scores on record. Pitch preparation in the 18th century can best be described as rudimentary and conditions invariably favoured the bowlers. It was not until 1895, when marl began to be used as a soil conditioner in pitches, that there was a general improvement in favour of batsmen. Scores of more than 50 were rare in the 1770s and it was not until 1775 that the earliest known century was scored in an important match. Hampshire batted first and were all out for 89. England lost two wickets cheaply but then Palmer and Thomas White came together and built a match winning partnership for the third wicket. Palmer scored 68 and White 69. The rest of the England batsmen were soon dismissed and the total was 202. Hampshire scored 140 to avoid an innings defeat. Palmer, who is known to have been a long stop fielder, took a catch to dismiss Richard Francis. Needing 28, England won by 9 wickets. Palmer did not bat.

Palmer played for Surrey in each of his other four 1773 matches. These were against Kent at Sevenoaks Vine on 16–18 August; against Hambledon Town at Broadhalfpenny Down on 26 August; against Hampshire at Laleham Burway on 16–18 September; and against Hampshire at Broadhalfpenny Down on 27–28 September. In the match at Sevenoaks, Palmer was number 2 in the Surrey batting order and scored 20 in both innings. He was run out in the first and caught behind by Richard Simmons in the second. Surrey scored 170 and 70; Kent replied with 141 and 100/4 to win by six wickets.

The match on 26 August ended in another Surrey victory by six wickets. Hambledon scored 103 and 51; Palmer scored 16 and 6 as Surrey replied with 131 and 24/4. The scorecard lacks dismissal details so it is not known if Palmer was out or not out in his two innings. At Laleham Burway, Surrey won by 8 wickets. Hampshire were all out for 38 and 145; Surrey scored 120 and 64/2. Palmer was bowled by Thomas Brett for 6 in the first innings and did not bat in the second. In the last match at the end of September, Surrey won by an innings and 60 runs. Hampshire were dismissed for 83 and 82; Surrey scored 225. Palmer made 14 but William Yalden scored 88 which equalled the highest score on record at the time.

=== 1774 to 1776 ===
Palmer's first known match in 1774 was for England against Hampshire at Broadhalfpenny Down on 22–24 June. Hampshire won by an innings and 52 runs. England scored 122 and 133; Palmer was out for 0 in the first innings and made only 6 in the second. Hampshire scored 307. There was a return match at Sevenoaks Vine on 8–9 July which Hampshire won by 169 runs. They scored 139 and 182; England were dismissed for 88 and 64, Palmer scoring 3 and 5. In the second innings, he was bowled by his Surrey colleague, Lumpy Stevens, who was playing for Hampshire as a given man.

After that poor start to the season, Palmer had a better game for Surrey against Hampshire at Guildford Bason on 20 July. Surrey were all out for 61 but he top-scored with 26 not out, batting at number 4 in the order. Hampshire were all out for 91, a lead of 30. Surrey in their second innings scored 77, Palmer being bowled by Richard Francis for 2. Hampshire replied with 48/3 to win by 7 wickets.

Palmer is recorded four times in 1775. In July, he played in two matches for Surrey against Hampshire. The first match was at Laleham Burway on 6–8 July. Surrey won by 69 runs. They batted first and were all out for 76, Palmer making the top score of 15. In the second innings, when Surrey scored 163, he made only 1. Hampshire were dismissed for 51 and 119. The second match was at Broadhalfpenny Down on 13–15 July. This was the famous match in which John Small scored the earliest known century in an important match. Hampshire batted first and scored 168; Surrey replied with 151 but Palmer was out without scoring. In their second innings, Hampshire lost four wickets very quickly and seemed to be heading for certain defeat but Small and his captain, Richard Nyren, built a large partnership for the fifth wicket. Small scored 136, Nyren 98 and Thomas Brett weighed in with 68. Their total of 357 was a huge score in the playing conditions of the time. Surrey were bowled out for 78, of which Palmer made the top score of 22, and Hampshire won by 296 runs. Arthur Haygarth commented on the fact that 754 runs were scored in the match.

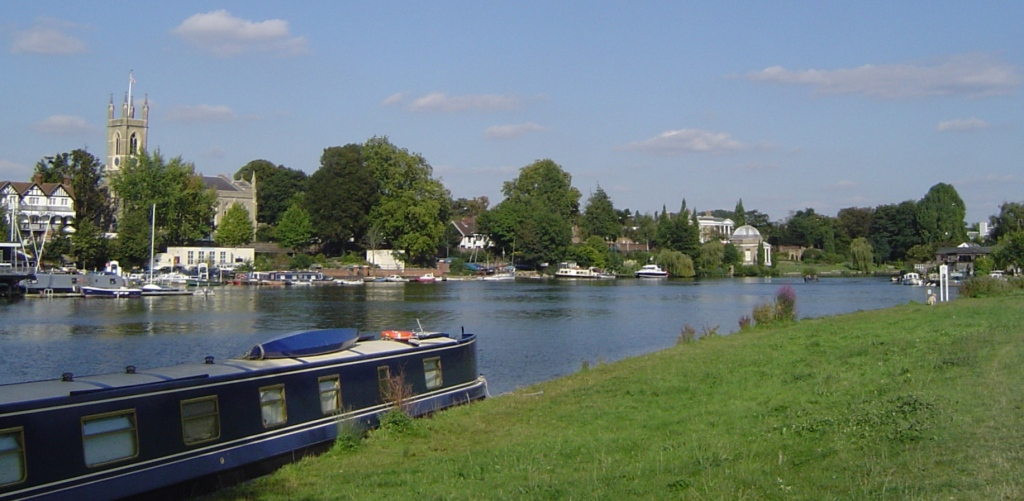
The River Thames at Moulsey Hurst, a popular sporting venue in the 18th century.

In September 1775, Palmer played for his local club Coulsdon against Chertsey and as a given man for London, also against Chertsey. Coulsdon lost heavily at Laleham Burway by 172 runs. Chertsey scored 152 and 148; Coulsdon were dismissed for 43 and 85, Palmer scoring 1 and 5. Chertsey beat London by 44 runs after scoring 106 and 122. London replied with 101 and 83; Palmer scored 9 and 5.

Palmer played for Kent as a given man on 5–7 June 1776. The match was against Hampshire on the neutral venue of Moulsey Hurst for a stake of 500 guineas. Hampshire scored 225 and 186; Kent scored 55 and 204, so Hampshire won by 152 runs. Palmer is number one in the scorecard but he was dismissed for 2 and 0, bowled by William Barber in both innings. Palmer's next known match was for Surrey against Hampshire at Laleham Burway on 6–8 August 1776. This was a very close contest which Surrey won by one wicket. Hampshire scored 94 and 176; Surrey 141 and 130/9. Again, Palmer did not have a successful match and was out for 2 and 5. In his last known match until 1784, he was out for a "pair", scoring 0 in both innings. He was bowled by Richard Nyren in the first and caught behind by Tom Sueter in the second. Hampshire won the match by 198 runs.

== Later years ==
Palmer is undocumented after 1776 except for one final reference in 1784. He was 47 years old by that time and may have been playing continuously for Coulsdon in the interim but there are no surviving reports of Coulsdon matches during that period. The 1784 match was against Chertsey at Laleham Burway on 22–23 June for a stake of £50 a team. Chertsey scored 219 and 186; Coulsdon could only score 63 and 29. Palmer scored 9 in the first innings and just 1 in the second. Chertsey won by 313 runs.

Haygarth left a short biographical note about Palmer which included the "batting well esteemed" verse. As Haygarth says, Palmer was a successful batsman in the few matches recorded of him (especially in 1773) but he undoubtedly began his career long before 1772 when match records were rarely created or maintained. Palmer died in Coulsdon in early 1790, and was buried there on 8 February 1790.

== Bibliography ==
- ACS (1981). A Guide to Important Cricket Matches Played in the British Isles 1709–1863. Nottingham: ACS. OCLC 85045528.
- Ashley-Cooper, F. S. (1924). Hambledon Cricket Chronicle: 1772–1796. London: Jenkins. OCLC 38498574.
- Bowen, Rowland (1970). Cricket: A History of its Growth and Development. London: Eyre & Spottiswoode. ISBN 978-04-13278-60-9.
- Buckley, G. B. (1935). Fresh Light on 18th Century Cricket. Birmingham: Cotterell & Co. OCLC 23450280.
- Haygarth, Arthur (1996) [1862]. Scores & Biographies, Volume 1 (1744–1826). Kennington: Frederick Lillywhite. ISBN 978-19-00592-23-9.
- Maun, Ian (2011). From Commons to Lord's, Volume Two: 1751 to 1770. Leicester: Martin Wilson. ISBN 978-09-56906-60-1.
- Waghorn, H. T. (1899). Cricket Scores, Notes, &c. From 1730–1773. Edinburgh: Blackwood. OCLC 1086375331.
- Waghorn, H. T. (2005) [1906]. The Dawn of Cricket. London: J. W. McKenzie. ISBN 978-09-47821-17-3.
