= 1767 English cricket season =

Cricket season review

There are reports of Hambledon's success continuing through the 1767 English cricket season, apparently with some remarkable batting performances. A total of eight historically important matches are known. (Note: Any match listed in the ACS' Important Match Guide (1981) is historically important, and therefore of the highest standard, whether or not a scorecard might exist. The same applies to numerous matches discovered by researchers since 1981. For further information, see First-class cricket.)

== Caterham v Hambledon ==
Hambledon played three matches against Caterham, whose patron was Henry Rowett. The first two were played towards the end of September, and Hambledon won them both by considerable margins.

The first match took place 'near Croydon', and Hambledon won by 262 runs, a huge margin for the times. Two Hambledon batsmen reportedly shared a partnership of 192, which was described in a contemporary report as 'the greatest thing ever known'; it is the earliest century partnership on record. The game was played for 200 guineas.

Hambledon had another big win, 28 and 29 September, on Broadhalfpenny Down, this time by 224 runs. No other details have survived. The third match was played 14 October on Caterham Common for a stake of £100. Perhaps surprisingly, given the results of the two previous games, this was won by Caterham.

== Other matches ==
Greenwich hosted London on 6 July at Blackheath, and London won by 2 runs. Afterwards, 'an elegant dinner was provided at the Assembly Rooms'.

On 4 August, Hampshire defeated Sussex at Broadhalfpenny Down, by an unknown margin. The outcome was given in the Reading Mercury of Monday, 10 August.

Sir Horace Mann is first recorded on or about 5 August at Bishopsbourne Paddock, where his Bourne Cricket Club challenged Surrey; the result is unknown. Sir Horatio's team had four given men, as reported in the Kentish Weekly Post on 5 August. The announcement says: 'Wickets to be pitched at 10 so the match may be played out that day on account of the Assizes'. It is not known what date 'that day' was. It is possible that the Surrey team was Henry Rowett's Caterham.

Richmond played Kingston on 23 September at Richmond Green. Richmond scored 70 and 55; Kingston replied with 71 and 55/8, so Kingston won by 2 wickets.

== Single wicket ==
On Monday, 17 August, there was a single wicket 'fives' game on Richmond Green between Richmond and Brentford. King George III was present, and ordered dinner for the players at The Feathers in Richmond. He also awarded a guinea each to the winners, and half a guinea each to the losers.

== Other events ==
There was a report concerning the Laws of Cricket in the Reading Mercury dated Monday, 8 June, which stated: 'The Articles of the Game of Cricket as settled in the year 1744 by the Society of Noblemen & Gentlemen at the Star & Garter in Pall Mall, may be had at the Printing Office in reading or of the newsmen, neatly printed on a whole sheet of fine writing paper, price only 3d, or on a pasteboard bordered with marble paper, price 6d'. The 'Society of Noblemen & Gentlemen' was the organisation that effectively ran cricket, horse racing, and some other sports. It was essentially a social club with sporting interests. The members are known to have backed London Cricket Club, and subsequently created both the White Conduit Club and Marylebone Cricket Club (MCC); while they also formed and subsidised the Jockey Club.

== First mentions ==
=== Clubs and teams ===
- Caterham

=== Players ===
- Henry Rowett

=== Venues ===
- Caterham Common

== Bibliography ==
- ACS (1981). A Guide to Important Cricket Matches Played in the British Isles 1709–1863. Nottingham: ACS. OCLC 85045528.
- Buckley, G. B. (1935). Fresh Light on 18th Century Cricket. Birmingham: Cotterell & Co. OCLC 23450280.
- Waghorn, H. T. (1899). Cricket Scores, Notes, &c. From 1730–1773. Edinburgh: Blackwood. OCLC 1086375331.
