= 1771 English cricket season =

Cricket season review

The earliest-known reference to cricket in Wales occurs in the 1771 English cricket season. Details of fourteen historically important eleven-a-side matches are known, (Note: Any match listed in the ACS' Important Match Guide (1981) is historically important, and therefore of the highest standard, whether or not a scorecard might exist. The same applies to numerous matches discovered by researchers since 1981. For further information, see First-class cricket.) including the Nottingham v Sheffield match in August. The season is also notable for the wide bat incident, resulting in an amendment to the Laws of Cricket which limited the maximum width of the bat to four and a quarter inches.

== Cricket in Wales ==
The first definite reference to cricket in Wales, and also in the county of Glamorgan, is a letter written April 1771 by a Swansea resident to the General Evening Post. The writer was complaining about young men gathering together on the Sabbath to take part in various sports, including cricket. He went on to say that the activities were accompanied by 'an enormous use of oaths', and that local pastors must do more to restrain such profanity on 'the Lord's day'.

== Nottingham v Sheffield ==
Played 26/27 August on the Forest New Ground in Nottingham, the match between the two northern town clubs of Nottingham and Sheffield was historically significant for the development of cricket in the North of England. It was an unusual match because the teams were to play three innings each. Sheffield had scored 81, 62 and 105 for a total of 248. In reply, Nottingham had scored 76 and 112 for a total of 188 with another innings in hand. However, the game ended prematurely, and was 'not determined on account of a dispute having arisen by one of the Sheffield players being jostled'.

Newspaper reports mention a Sheffield batsman called Osguthorpe who 'kept in batting for several hours together'.

The match is the earliest known reference to cricket in Nottinghamshire. Both town clubs were the forerunners of their eventual county clubs: Nottinghamshire County Cricket Club, founded in 1841; and Yorkshire County Cricket Club, founded in 1863.

== England v Hambledon ==
England played Hambledon on 12/13 August at Guildford Bason. Hambledon scored 65 and 90; England took a sizeable first innings lead with 146, and needed only 10–0 to win the game convincingly by 10 wickets. The game was reported in the London Gazetteer on Friday, 16 August.

== Chertsey v Hambledon ==
Chertsey hosted Hambledon, 23 and 24 September, on Laleham Burway. Hambledon won by 1 run after totalling 218 in their two innings combined; Chertsey's total was 217. The stake was £50 a side, and the articles decreed that it must be played out, so it became a two-day match.

Although there is no certainty about it, this match is generally reckoned to have been the one in which Thomas White, playing for Chertsey, used his extra wide bat, causing the Hambledon players to object. Whenever it happened, the incident brought about a change in the 1774 version of the Laws of Cricket wherein the maximum width of the bat was set at four and one quarter inches.

A return match took place 30 September and 1 October on Broadhalfpenny Down. Chertsey scored 117 and 126. Hambledon replied with 230 and 14 for 0 to win convincingly by 10 wickets.

== Duke of Dorset v Sir Horatio Mann ==
There is some confusion about nomenclature, but two matches were played between teams raised by the Duke of Dorset and Sir Horatio Mann. The first was played 28 and 29 August at Bishopsbourne Paddock and was titled Bourne v Middlesex & Surrey (alternatively, Mann's XI v Dorset's XI). Middlesex & Surrey scored 66 and 25, to which Bourne replied with 53 and 37, so the counties team won by one run.

The return match took place 4 and 5 September on the Artillery Ground. One source calls this match Dorset's XI v Mann's XI, while another says Middlesex & Surrey v Bourne. In another very close finish, Dorset's XI needed 27 to win when their penultimate wicket fell, but the last pair held on to score the runs, and gain a one wicket victory.

== Other events ==
Chertsey played two matches against a combined Richmond, Hampton & Brentford team in July, but no post-match reports were found.

A team called the Gentlemen of Sussex was active in July and August, playing three matches against the Gentlemen of Kent and two against the Gentlemen of Hampshire. it would seem that these teams were strictly "gentlemen only", so the matches must be considered minor in status. Kent won the first match of their three, but the other two are result unknown. Sussex won both their matches against Hampshire, one by 8 wickets, the other by an innings and 74 runs.

In August, there were two minor games at Cobham Tilt in which one of the teams was led by Charles Bennet, 4th Earl of Tankerville, a patron of Surrey in the 1770s. He was also the employer of Lumpy Stevens, who was a gardener at Tankerville's Walton-on-Thames estate. Tankerville succeeded to his title on the death of his father on 27 October 1767. This is the earliest-known mention of him in a cricketing connection.

On 8 August, the St James Chronicle reported that a combined Middlesex, Kent & Surrey team had defeated Coulsdon by 45 runs.

On Saturday, 16 November, a general meeting 'of the subscribers to the Broadhalfpenny Cricket Club will be held at the George Inn, at Hambledon, in order to appoint stewards and settle the plan for the ensuing year'.

== First mentions ==
=== Countries ===
- Wales

=== Counties ===
- Glamorgan
- Nottinghamshire

=== Clubs and teams ===
- Nottingham

=== Venues ===
- Forest New Ground, Nottingham

== Bibliography ==
- ACS (1981). A Guide to Important Cricket Matches Played in the British Isles 1709–1863. Nottingham: ACS. OCLC 85045528.
- Buckley, G. B. (1935). Fresh Light on 18th Century Cricket. Birmingham: Cotterell & Co. OCLC 23450280.
- Buckley, G. B. (1937). Fresh Light on pre-Victorian Cricket. Birmingham: Cotterell & Co. OCLC 23469107.
- McCann, Tim (2004). Sussex Cricket in the Eighteenth Century (PDF). Vol. 88. Lewes: West Sussex Record Office. ISBN 978-08-54450-55-8.
- Playfair (2025). Marshall, Ian (ed.). Playfair Cricket Annual. Headline. ISBN 978-1-0354-1179-5.
- Waghorn, H. T. (1899). Cricket Scores, Notes, &c. From 1730–1773. Edinburgh: Blackwood. OCLC 1086375331.
- Waghorn, H. T. (2005) [1906]. The Dawn of Cricket. London: J. W. McKenzie. ISBN 978-09-47821-17-3.
