= Joseph Miller (cricketer) =

English cricketer (?–1784)

Personal information
- Full name: Joseph Miller
- Born: England
- Died: Bridge, Kent
- Batting: right-handed batsman (RHB)
- Bowling: none
- Role: specialist batsman

Domestic team information
- Years: Team
- 1773–1783: Kent
- 1773–1778: Surrey

Joseph Miller (died October 1784) was a noted English cricketer who is generally considered to have been one of the greatest batsmen of the 18th century. He is mostly associated with Kent but also made appearances for England and Surrey. First recorded in the 1769 season, Miller made 65 known appearances in historically important matches, (Note: Any match listed in the ACS' Important Match Guide (1981) is historically important, and therefore of the highest standard, whether or not a scorecard might exist. The same applies to numerous matches discovered by researchers since 1981. For further information, see First-class cricket.) including single wicket from then to 1783, though he certainly played in many matches of similar status whose records have been lost or are incomplete. He was unquestionably an outstanding batsman, and perhaps second only to John Small in the 18th century. He made numerous good scores as the match details consistently show.

== Cricket career ==
The first mention of a player called Miller in important matches was in the Caterham v Bourne match on Friday, 10 June 1768. This Miller was playing for Caterham, a Surrey team, while the 'crack' batsman of the 1770s played invariably for Kent-based teams. Caterham won the match by 14 runs and Miller scored 3 and 20. Apart from the result and the individual scores, no other details have survived. He was next recorded in 1769 playing for Caterham against Hambledon at Guildford Bason, Hambledon winning by 4 wickets. No details of individual performances have survived except a brief report that Hambledon's victory was due to the batting of John Small and John Bayton.

More is known about Miller's career from 1772 when scorecards began to be kept on a habitual basis. The first definite mention of him is in a 'fives' single wicket match between Kent and Hampshire at the Artillery Ground in June 1772. He took part in all three important matches recorded in the 1772 season. In the second, playing for All-England against Hampshire at Guildford Bason, he was top scorer for his team in both innings with 30 out of 126 and then 26 out of only 86.

In 1773, he scored a total of 316 runs in his 7 known important match appearances with a best score of 73 (out of 177) for All-England v Hampshire at Sevenoaks Vine on 28 & 29 June. His innings enabled All-England to win by an innings and 51 runs. When Kent played Surrey at Sevenoaks Vine in August 1773, Miller scored 42 out of 141 in the first innings and then an unbeaten 32 out of 100–4 in the second innings, leading Kent to a 6 wickets victory. Haygarth recounts how a poem called The Kentish Cricketers was composed after this match. It was in reply to a poem called Surrey Triumphant, a parody of Chevy Chase which had apparently been published earlier that season. In September 1773, Miller played as a "given man" for Surrey v Hampshire at Laleham Burway and, again, two good scores enabled his team to win by 8 wickets. He scored 37 out of 120 in the first innings and an unbeaten 30 out of 64–2 in the second innings.

Miller's best known performance was for Kent v Hampshire at Sevenoaks Vine in August 1774 when he made 95 out of 240 and enabled Kent to win by an innings and 35 runs. A week later, in the return match at Broadhalfpenny Down, Miller scored 40 and 45 out of 168 and 136–6 as Kent won by 4 wickets.

Miller's innings of 95 was briefly the highest individual score recorded in first-class cricket (i.e., since the statistical record began in 1772), beating the 88 scored by William Yalden in 1773. Miller's "world record" lasted only a year until John Small beat it with the earliest known first-class century.

Miller was less successful in 1775 and experienced a number of low scores but he did play two notable innings of 71 for Kent v Hampshire and then 42 for Surrey against Hampshire. He had an indifferent season in 1776 but then recovered his form in 1777 when he made a total of 311 runs in 6 known appearances including scores of 65, 64 and 51 in three separate matches for All-England against Hampshire. He made a few useful scores in 1778 when his best was 59 for Surrey against Hampshire.

Miller made only one more half-century which was a score of exactly 50 for All-England against Hampshire at Itchin Stoke Down in September 1780. His date of birth is unknown but, as he had been playing since the 1760s, he must have reached the veteran stage by the 1780s and his scores were less notable than they had been a decade earlier. Apart from a few useful contributions, Miller was by 1782 playing a minor role. He made 3 known important match appearances in 1783, his final season, and his last known match was Kent v Hampshire at Bourne Paddock in August. Hampshire won by 85 runs and, if the batting order in the scorecard is correct, Miller batted last and scored just 2 and 9.

== Style and personality ==
Arthur Haygarth's biography of Miller quotes John Nyren's comment that Miller had a beautiful style and was as "firm and steady as the Pyramids". He was a man "to be depended on and very active" as well as being "a kind-hearted and amiable man".

Nyren also says that Miller and John Minshull were "the only two batsmen (i.e., in the 1770s) that the Hambledon men were afraid of". He comments on Miller's ability to "cut a ball at the point of the bat" and adds, slightly contradicting Haygarth's version, that "although (Miller was) fully as stout a man as Minshull, he was considerably more active".

Little is known about Miller personally except that he seems to have been a gamekeeper employed by the Duke of Dorset at Knole House near Sevenoaks. Latterly, he took up residence with Sir Horatio Mann at Bourne, probably in the same employment. His burial took place at Bridge, Kent on 31 October 1784, only a year after his last recorded match.

== Alternative first name ==
Miller's first name may be subject to question for, although he is generally known as Joseph, he has also been referred to as Richard, though that would seem to be due to confusion with the Richard Miller (possibly his brother) who played alongside him in one match for Surrey in the 1774 season. In his Cricket Scores, H. T. Waghorn records that "Richard Miller" played for Kent against Surrey at Laleham Burway in June 1773, but in Haygarth's version of this scorecard, he has listed the player as "J. Miller".

The majority of sources call him J. or Joseph although Nyren, a great admirer of Miller, uses his surname only.

Haygarth, who studied all of the old scorecards and biographical material available, acknowledges that "there seems to have been two (Millers) but it is almost certain that 'J' was the 'crack' and played in the great contests of the day". G. B. Buckley does not attempt to correct Haygarth re Miller in his appendix of additions and amendments to Scores and Biographies, and thereby accepts that J. Miller is the correct version.

== Bibliography ==
- ACS (1981). A Guide to Important Cricket Matches Played in the British Isles 1709–1863. Nottingham: ACS. OCLC 85045528.
- Ashley-Cooper, F. S. (1924). Hambledon Cricket Chronicle: 1772–1796. London: Jenkins. OCLC 38498574.
- Buckley, G. B. (1935). Fresh Light on 18th Century Cricket. Birmingham: Cotterell & Co. OCLC 23450280.
- Haygarth, Arthur (1996) [1862]. Scores & Biographies, Volume 1 (1744–1826). Kennington: Frederick Lillywhite. ISBN 978-19-00592-23-9.
- Major, John (2007). More Than A Game. London: HarperCollins. ISBN 978-00-07183-64-7 – via Internet Archive.
- McCann, Tim (2004). Sussex Cricket in the Eighteenth Century (PDF). Vol. 88. Lewes: West Sussex Record Office. ISBN 978-08-54450-55-8.
- Nyren, John (1998) [1832]. Mote, Ashley (ed.). The Cricketers of my Time. London: Robson Publishing. ISBN 978-18-61051-68-4.
- Underdown, David (2000). Start of Play. Westminster: Allen Lane. ISBN 978-07-13993-30-1 – via Internet Archive.
- Waghorn, H. T. (1899). Cricket Scores, Notes, &c. From 1730–1773. Edinburgh: Blackwood. OCLC 1086375331.
- Waghorn, H. T. (2005) [1906]. The Dawn of Cricket. London: J. W. McKenzie. ISBN 978-09-47821-17-3.
