= 1759 English cricket season =

Cricket season review

Three Dartford v England matches were played in the 1759 English cricket season, but there were no notable single wicket matches. (Note: Any match listed in the ACS' Important Match Guide (1981) is historically important, and therefore of the highest standard, whether or not a scorecard might exist. The same applies to numerous matches discovered by researchers since 1981. For further information, see First-class cricket.)

== Dartford v England ==
Three matches between Dartford and England were played in September from the 5th to the 12th. The first two were on Dartford Brent, the third on Laleham Burway. In all three matches, Dartford had Tom Faulkner and Gascoigne of London as given men. Dartford won the first match, and England the second, both by unknown margins. The deciding match was scheduled for Wednesday, 12 September, according to an announcement in the Whitehall Evening Post the previous day. Dartford won that by 3 wickets.

Arthur Haygarth refers to this "tri-series" on page 2 of Scores & Biographies, but only to the two games won by Dartford. He appears to believe that only those two games were played. He found the names of the players in Bell's Life, dated 23 November 1845, but no scores. Bell's Life stated that the matches took place in 1765, and Haygarth says another account has 1762, but it is evident that G. B. Buckley has got the dates (and the sequence) right as above.

Dartford's team, evidently unchanged in all three games, was: Tom Faulkner, Gascoigne (both London, and given men), John Frame, John Bell (wicket-keeper), Potter (long stop), Thomas Brandon, Thomas Bell, Goldstone, Killick, Stephens/Stevens, and Wakelin. There were several players called Stephens or Stevens during this period, including Lumpy.

The England team, also apparently unchanged, was: Burchwood (Kent), John Edmeads (Surrey), Edward Gill (Buckinghamshire, wicket-keeper), Thomas Woods (Surrey, long stop), Stephen Harding (Surrey), John Haynes (Surrey), William Durling (Kent), Saunders (Berkshire), Allen (Middlesex), Nyland (Sussex), and Cheeseman (Sussex).

The main bowlers were stated to be Faulkner and Frame for Dartford; and Burchwood and Edmeads for England. Edmeads was still playing for Chertsey and Surrey in the 1770s. Edward Gill of Buckinghamshire is the wicket-keeper in the scorecarded Hampshire v England match of June 1772.

== First mentions ==
There were no new counties, teams, or venues in 1759 but, of the 22 players in the Dartford v England matches, the names of fourteen occur for the first time:

- Burchwood (Kent)
- Cheeseman (Sussex)
- John Edmeads (Surrey)
- Gascoigne (London)
- Edward Gill (Bucks)
- Goldstone (Dartford/Kent)
- John Haynes (Surrey)
- Killick (Dartford/Kent)
- Nyland (Sussex)
- Potter (Dartford/Kent)
- Saunders (Berkshire)
- Stephens (Dartford/Kent)
- Wakelin (Dartford/Kent)
- Thomas Woods (Chertsey/Surrey)

== Bibliography ==
- ACS (1981). A Guide to Important Cricket Matches Played in the British Isles 1709–1863. Nottingham: ACS. OCLC 85045528.
- Buckley, G. B. (1935). Fresh Light on 18th Century Cricket. Birmingham: Cotterell & Co. OCLC 23450280.
- Haygarth, Arthur (1996) [1862]. Scores & Biographies, Volume 1 (1744–1826). Kennington: Frederick Lillywhite. ISBN 978-19-00592-23-9.
- Maun, Ian (2011). From Commons to Lord's, Volume Two: 1751 to 1770. Leicester: Martin Wilson. ISBN 978-09-56906-60-1.
