= John Boorman (cricketer) =

English cricketer

John Boorman (1754 – 1 August 1807) was an English cricketer whose known career spanned 26 seasons from 1768 to 1793. In Scores & Biographies, Arthur Haygarth recorded that he found a reference to Boorman in an account of a single wicket match in 1772 which called him James, but Haygarth was convinced that the correct name was John, although CricketArchive and CricInfo both prefer to use James. Haygarth discovered that Boorman was "probably" born at Cranbrook in Kent but may have resided for many years at Sevenoaks, though he certainly died at Ashurst in Sussex, where he spent his latter years as a farmer. Boorman's year of birth is an estimate based on evidence found by Haygarth that he was 53 when he died and Haygarth made a comment that Boorman "began playing in great matches very young". Boorman is believed to have been a left-handed batsman; as a fielder, he was generally deployed at point.

Many of Boorman's appearances are unrecorded, as is the case with many 18th century players. The total number of appearances credited to him in sources is 63, of which 61 were in eleven-a-side matches and two in single wicket matches.

Boorman is first recorded in May 1768 playing in a five-a-side single wicket match at the Artillery Ground. He was in a team formed by Sir Horatio Mann, playing against John Sackville's Five, and scored eight runs in the match which Sackville's team won by four wickets. A few weeks later, Boorman made his first known appearance in an eleven-aside match when he played for Mann's Bourne team against Henry Rowett's Caterham on Westerham Common. One of the earliest scorecards has survived and records that Boorman scored one and nine.

Boorman played mostly for Kent. He played for Middlesex as a given man against Essex in the earliest known match on Lord's Old Ground in May 1787, top scoring for the home team in both innings with 23 and 37 and taking six wickets in the match. From 1789 to 1793, Boorman made four appearances for Essex, six for Hornchurch Cricket Club and one for a team organised by Richard Newman played at Navestock Side in Essex; Haygarth suggested that he might have been living in Essex at this point, although this is not certain.

== Bibliography ==
- Buckley, G. B. (1935). Fresh Light on 18th Century Cricket. Cotterell.
- Haygarth, Arthur (1862). Scores & Biographies, Volume 1 (1744–1826). Lillywhite.
- Maun, Ian (2011). From Commons to Lord's, Volume Two: 1751 to 1770. Martin Wilson. ISBN 978-0-9569066-0-1.
