= Edward Gill (cricketer) =

English cricketer (18th century)

Edward Gill (dates unknown) was an English cricketer of the mid-Georgian period who came from Buckinghamshire. He played for his county team, and also represented various England teams. Gill was a top-class player who, following George Kipps, was one of the sport's earliest-known accomplished wicket-keepers. He made numerous appearances in historically important matches, both eleven-a-side and single wicket. (Note: Any match listed in the ACS' Important Match Guide (1981) is historically important, and therefore of the highest standard, whether or not a scorecard might exist. The same applies to numerous matches discovered by researchers since 1981. For further information, see First-class cricket.) (Note: Matches at this time were played on rudimentary pitches with a two-stump wicket. The batter used a curved bat and the bowler delivered the ball with an underarm action by bowling it all along the ground. The sport underwent an evolutionary change in the 1760s when bowlers began pitching the ball, still using an underarm action, and the modern straight bat was introduced in response.) (Note: Scorecard data till at least 1825 was never comprehensive, especially the dismissal information: bowling analyses lacked balls bowled and runs conceded; bowlers were not credited with wickets when the batsman was caught or stumped; in many matches, the means of dismissal were omitted.)

== Career ==
The full span of Gill's career is unknown, as he was mainly active in the period before match scorecards began to be preserved in the 1772 season. He is first recorded playing for England in three matches against Dartford in the 1759 season. The record confirms that he was a wicket-keeper of Buckinghamshire origin. The first two of these matches were played on Dartford Brent, the third on Laleham Burway in Chertsey. Dartford won the first match, and England the second, both by unknown margins. The deciding match was scheduled for Wednesday, 12 September, according to an announcement in the Whitehall Evening Post the previous day. Dartford won that by 3 wickets.

Gill's surname appears in the first scorecard that has survived from the 1772 season. He was England's wicket-keeper in a match against Hambledon on Broadhalfpenny Down, played from 23 to 25 June. The scorecard gives the team totals, and the number of runs scored by each batsman, but there is no dismissal information. Hambledon had William Yalden and John Edmeads as given men. Yalden was one of cricket's top wicket-keepers through the 1770s, but he was "given" to Hambledon even though their regular keeper Tom Sueter was in the team, so Gill was the first choice as England keeper. It is not known if Gill was a wicket-keeper-batter like Sueter and Yalden, but he scored 5 and 2 in this match (Sueter scored 2 and 9; Yalden 5 and 9).

In a relatively low-scoring match, Hambledon totalled 146 and 79; England replied with 109 and 63. The difference between the two teams was John Small, described by John Nyren as "a star of the first magnitude", who scored 78 and 34, enabling Hambledon to win by 53 runs.

There was a return match between the two teams in July 1772. It was played at Guildford Bason, and Hambledon won by 72 runs. Gill did not play, and England's wicket-keeper was Richard Simmons. Gill has not been found in sources after June 1772.

== See also ==
- History of English cricket (1751–1775)
- 1759 English cricket season
- 1772 English cricket season

== Bibliography ==
- ACS (1981). A Guide to Important Cricket Matches Played in the British Isles 1709–1863. Nottingham: ACS. OCLC 85045528.
- Ashley-Cooper, F. S. (1924). Hambledon Cricket Chronicle: 1772–1796. London: Jenkins. OCLC 38498574.
- Buckley, G. B. (1935). Fresh Light on 18th Century Cricket. Birmingham: Cotterell & Co. OCLC 23450280.
- Haygarth, Arthur (1996) [1862]. Scores & Biographies, Volume 1 (1744–1826). Kennington: Frederick Lillywhite. ISBN 978-19-00592-23-9.
- Haygarth, Arthur (1997) [1862]. Scores & Biographies, Volume 2 (1827–1840). Kennington: Frederick Lillywhite. ISBN 978-19-00592-23-9.
- Maun, Ian (2011). From Commons to Lord's, Volume Two: 1751 to 1770. Leicester: Martin Wilson. ISBN 978-09-56906-60-1.
- Nyren, John (1998) [1832]. Mote, Ashley (ed.). The Cricketers of my Time. London: Robson Publishing. ISBN 978-18-61051-68-4.
- Webber, Roy (1951). The Playfair Book of Cricket Records. London: Playfair Books Ltd. OCLC 753176177.
