= Caterham (disambiguation) =

Caterham is a town in Surrey, England.

Caterham may also refer to:

- Caterham Group, parent company for automotive and motor racing businesses
  - Caterham Cars, a British manufacturer of specialist lightweight sports cars
- Caterham Barracks, a former military installation in Caterham, Surrey
- HMS Caterham (1919), a World War I Royal Navy minesweeper
- Caterham Common, a former cricket ground
- Caterham Cricket Club, a cricket club in Caterham, Surrey
- Caterham F1, a Formula One team based in the United Kingdom
- Caterham Racing (GP2 team), a motor racing team competing in the GP2 Series and GP2 Asia Series
- Caterham line, a railway commuter line running between Purley in South London and Caterham in Surrey
- Caterham High School, Clayhall, London
- Caterham School, an independent co-educational day and boarding school in Caterham, Surrey
- Caterham railway station, serving Caterham, Surrey
- Ethel Caterham (born 1909), British supercentenarian and last living Edwardian
- Caterham, a character in H. G. Wells' novel The Food of the Gods and How It Came to Earth
