= William Bedle =

English cricketer (1680–1768)

William Bedle (4 March 1680 – 3 June 1768) was an English cricketer who played for Dartford Cricket Club and Kent in the first quarter of the 18th century. With the possible exception of Charles Lennox, 1st Duke of Richmond, Bedle is the earliest known accomplished player, certainly the earliest who is renowned solely for his expertise as a player. He was born in Bromley but lived most of his life near Dartford, where he was a wealthy farmer and grazier.

== Cricket career ==
Bedle is the first known cricketer "who achieved great prominence in the game" for it was said of him in his obituary in Lloyd's Evening Post dated 10 June 1768 that he was "formerly accounted the most expert cricket player in England". Rowland Bowen wrote that Bedle was thus "the first in a long line (of the best players in England) that must include Fuller Pilch, W. G. Grace, Jack Hobbs and Wally Hammond". This assessment of his ability means that three things can be deduced: he was a great player; the means of judging a player's prowess were then available; and Bedle's reputation lasted at least a generation after his playing career ended.

Bedle played in the first quarter of the 18th century (Note: Note that surviving match records to 1825 are incomplete and any statistical compilation of a player's career in that period is based on known data. Match scorecards were not always created, or have been lost, and the matches themselves were not always recorded in the press or other media. Scorecard data was not comprehensive: e.g., bowling analyses lacked balls bowled and runs conceded; bowlers were not credited with wickets when the batsman was caught or stumped; in many matches, the means of dismissal were omitted.) and his career dates are tentatively given as 1700 to 1725 (ages 21 to 46), though the span could have been much greater. He was a member of Dartford Cricket Club, which was "the greatest Kent team of the first half of the eighteenth century" and which was often representative of Kent as a county. The Dartford club's website records that Bedle was "the first great player in cricketing annals" and "the earliest Dartford cricketer whose name has come down to posterity".

Few details of cricket matches in the 17th and early 18th centuries have survived and so what is known about Bedle's career has been pieced together by historical analysis as contemporary newspaper reports rarely mentioned a player by name. The reason for this lack of surviving data is that freedom of the press was not allowed in England until 1696, when Bedle was 16, and the infant newspaper industry gradually introduced coverage of sporting events, though for many years their emphasis was on betting rather than on the matches themselves. During Bedle's career, cricket reports were not only brief but few and far between.

Even without written record of his exploits, Bedle's reputation was known and shared by a public that was growing increasingly interested in cricket. As Bowen comments in his history, it is significant that he was remembered as the best player in England some forty years after his career ended.

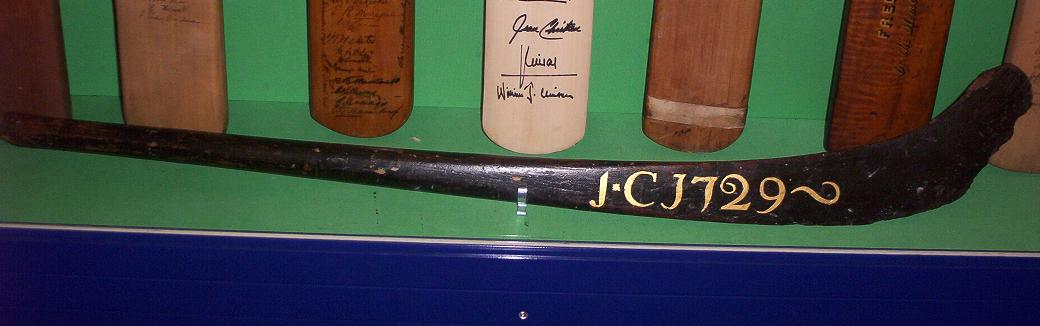
A surviving example of the type of bat that was in use during William Bedle's career.

Bedle used a bat that was shaped like a modern hockey stick, this being the ideal shape for addressing a ball that was "trundled" or "skimmed" along the ground, as in lawn bowls, and given that he was "the most expert player", he was effective in the timing and variety of his strokes. Bowlers in the 18th century used the underarm style exclusively but at varying pace and it is unknown if Bedle was a fast or a slow bowler. The ball was either rolled along the ground or, if a fast bowler, skimmed across the surface; pitching was not introduced until about 1760.

Dartford was one of the two most successful clubs in England, its only rival being the London Cricket Club. Dartford's prowess is borne out by a 1723 journal entry recorded by the prominent Tory politician Robert Harley, Earl of Oxford:

At Dartford upon the Heath (i.e., Dartford Brent) as we came out of the town, the men of Tonbridge and the Dartford men were warmly engaged at the sport of cricket, which of all the people of England the Kentish folk are the most renowned for, and of all the Kentish men, the men of Dartford lay claim to the greatest excellence.

Records have survived of six matches involving Dartford or Kent teams against London or Surrey between 1700 and 1725. The earliest known inter-county match took place in the 1709 season between Kent and Surrey on Dartford Brent. The result is unknown. London hosted Kent at White Conduit Fields in August 1719 and July 1720, Kent winning the first and London the second. There were London v Dartford fixtures in July 1722 and then two in June 1724. The 1722 match, played on White Conduit Fields, was the subject of a letter in The Weekly Journal dated 21 July 1722. Of the two 1724 matches, the second one was the earliest known match at Kennington Common, near where The Oval is now sited. The results of these matches are unknown. Bedle was a near contemporary of Edwin Stead, the first great patron of Kent cricket who is known to have had a Dartford connection. Stead was 22 years younger than Bedle but it is possible that they were colleagues in the mid to late 1720s.

== Personal life ==
Bedle lived near Dartford for most of his life, where he was a farmer and grazier. His name, also spelled Beddel, is recorded on a tablet in Dartford parish church listing the bellringers of 1749. He died at his home near Dartford on 3 June 1768, aged 88.

== Bibliography ==
- Birley, Derek (1999). A Social History of English Cricket. London: Aurum Press. ISBN 978-18-54107-10-7 – via Internet Archive.
- Bowen, Rowland (1970). Cricket: A History of its Growth and Development. London: Eyre & Spottiswoode. ISBN 978-04-13278-60-9.
- Buckley, G. B. (1935). Fresh Light on 18th Century Cricket. Birmingham: Cotterell & Co. OCLC 23450280.
- Buckley, G. B. (1937). Fresh Light on pre-Victorian Cricket. Birmingham: Cotterell & Co. OCLC 23469107.
- Underdown, David (2000). Start of Play. Westminster: Allen Lane. ISBN 978-07-13993-30-1 – via Internet Archive.
- Waghorn, H. T. (2005) [1906]. The Dawn of Cricket. London: J. W. McKenzie. ISBN 978-09-47821-17-3.
