= Thomas Quiddington =

English cricketer

Personal information
- Full name: Thomas Quiddington
- Born: January 21, 1743; Coulsdon, Surrey
- Died: December 6, 1804 (aged 61); Coulsdon, Surrey

Domestic team information
- Years: Team
- Surrey

Career statistics
Competition	FC
Matches	4
Runs scored	55
Batting average	11.00
100s/50s	0/0
Top score	20
Catches/stumpings	0/0
- Source: Cricinfo, 3 December 2025

Thomas Quiddington (christened 21 January 1743, Coulsdon, Surrey – buried 6 December 1804, Coulsdon) was an English cricketer of the mid-18th century who played for Surrey.

== Career ==
Quiddington was a member of the famous Chertsey Cricket Club. His name has the alternative spelling of Quiddenden. He was primarily a bowler but his pace and style are unknown. He was a long stop fielder and described as a "steady batter".

Quiddington's career probably began in the aftermath of the Seven Years' War and he was certainly active between the 1769 and 1784 seasons. He is first recorded playing for Caterham v Hambledon at Guildford Bason on 31 July and 1 August 1769, a game that Hambledon won by 4 wickets.

His last recorded appearance was for Chertsey v Coulsdon in June 1784.
