= John Bayton =

English cricketer

John Bayton (date of birth unknown; died 1797 at West Dean, Chichester, Sussex) was an English professional cricketer who played in important matches during the 1760s and 1770s.

Bayton, a noted batsman, was chiefly associated with the Hambledon Club and played for both Hampshire and Sussex. His career was virtually over by the time detailed scorecards began to be kept in the 1772 English cricket season and so little is known about his personal history.

He is variously called Bayton, Boyton or Boynton by different sources but his exact name was John Bayton. He was an outstanding batsman for Hampshire in both the 1768 season and the 1769 season, after which he became an occasional player who had left Hambledon by 1771.

Bayton was due to play for Sussex against Hampshire in a cancelled match of the 1773 season.

Two verses from the Hambledon Club Song, written by Reverend Reynell Cotton in about the 1771 season, indicate a certain bravado about the loss of John Bayton but there seems little doubt from the known records that he was a fine batsman and not the sort any club would wish to lose. The verses go:

Then why should we fear either Sackville or Mann,
Or repine at the loss of both Bayton and Land?

== Bibliography ==
- F S Ashley-Cooper, The Hambledon Cricket Chronicle, Herbert Jenkins, 1924
- Arthur Haygarth, Scores & Biographies, Volume 1 (1744–1826), Lillywhite, 1862
- Timothy J McCann, Sussex Cricket in the Eighteenth Century, Sussex Record Society, 2004
- Ashley Mote, The Glory Days of Cricket, Robson, 1997
