= Westerham Common =

Cricket ground in Westerham, England

Westerham Common, also known as Westerham Heath, was a cricket ground near Westerham in west Kent. It was used primarily in the 18th century for historically important matches.

In May 1730, a single wicket match between four men of Kent, captained by Edwin Stead, and four of Brentford was played for a wager of £50. It was the first game in what became a tri-series. In June 1768, Westerham and Caterham, captained by Henry Rowett, played Bourne Cricket Club, captained by Sir Horatio Mann. The Heath was used as a cricket venue occasionally in the 20th century.
