= George Ring =

English cricketer

George Ring (9 April 1770 – 4 May 1865) was an English professional cricketer who made two known appearances in important matches in 1796. He was the younger brother of Joey Ring.

Ring was born at Darenth near Dartford in Kent in 1770. He played both of his important matches for England teams at Dandelion Paddock, Margate in 1796. Professionally he worked as a huntsman for Sir Horatio Mann, a significant Kent patron of cricket, and as a gamekeeper, including for Earl Cornwallis. He later became a farmer. He died at Bethersden in Kent in 1865 aged 95.
