= John Wood (Surrey cricketer, born 1744) =

English cricketer (1744–1793)

Personal information
- Full name: John Wood
- Born: October, 1744; Coulsdon, Surrey
- Died: March, 1793; Coulsdon
- Role: Bowler

Domestic team information
- Years: Team
- 1775–1784: Coulsdon
- 1773–1776: Surrey

John Wood aka Thomas Wood (born October 1744 and died March 1793 at Coulsdon, Surrey) was an English cricketer who played for Chertsey Cricket Club and Surrey. His career began in the 1760s before statistics began to be recorded and his known career spans the 1773 to 1780 seasons.

He has often been confused with his namesake who played for Kent at the same time. Although Wood is credited with 23 appearances by CricketArchive, there are only 13 which can definitely be attributed to him. Using the data in Scores and Biographies, there were 12 matches in which a player known only as "Wood" took part, with Wood of Kent specifically recorded in 10.

In addition to confusion about Wood's namesake, there is uncertainty about his forename as he is called Thomas Wood in Scores and Biographies, where he is described as "Thomas Wood, a miller, living in Pirbright, Surrey". This is almost certainly incorrect. CricketArchive believes that his name was John Wood. It seems that Scores and Biographies has equated him with Thomas Woods who played as a given man for Chertsey against Dartford in 1761 when John Wood was only 16.

The first time a John Wood is mentioned in the sources is when one plays for Caterham against Hambledon in 1769. This was probably the Surrey-based player. In the same season, a player called Wood played for the Duke of Dorset's XI against Wrotham in the minor match that featured John Minshull's century. Given Dorset's strong Kent connection, this was probably John Wood of Kent.

Both John Woods are found in 1773 scorecards and are usually differentiated in Scores & Biographies by the Surrey one being called Thomas. Wood of Surrey had a very good season in 1773 and was one of the leading wicket takers that year.

== Bibliography ==
- G B Buckley, Fresh Light on 18th Century Cricket, Cotterell, 1935
- Arthur Haygarth, Scores & Biographies, Volume 1 (1744–1826), Lillywhite, 1862
- John Nyren, The Cricketers of my Time (ed. Ashley Mote), Robson, 1998
- H T Waghorn, Cricket Scores, Notes, etc. (1730–1773), Blackwood, 1899
- H T Waghorn, The Dawn of Cricket, Electric Press, 1906
