= Clifton Villa Estate =

Cricket ground in Margate, Kent, England

- Interactive map of Clifton Villa Estate

Ground information
- Location: Cliftonville, Margate, Kent
- Country: England
- Coordinates: 51.3906°N 1.3925°E (approx.)
- Establishment: 1864 (first recorded match)

Team information
Kent County Cricket Club	(1864)
- As of 10 August 2010; Source: CricketArchive

Clifton Villa Estate, also known as New Cricket Ground, was a cricket ground in the Cliftonville area of the town of Margate in Kent. The only first-class cricket match played on the ground was between Kent County Cricket Club and Sussex County Cricket Club in July 1864. The ground was leased from the Cliftonville Estate from July to October to be used for cricket, although only one other match is known to have taken place on the ground. This took place in the same year and was a non-first-class match between a Margate team and the United All-England Eleven.

The ground was built on farmland on the eastern outskirts of Margate. It was only in existence for a short time with the land being built on soon after 1864 as Margate and Cliftonville experienced a rapid expansion following the arrival of the railway in the area. It was probably located in the area of the modern Dalby Square in Cliftonville. This was originally known as Ethelbert Square and was developed as a residential area from 1865. The large Cliftonville Hotel was built in 1868 on what was described as "an island site in the middle of corn fields" to become Margate's "first grand hotel". Grass tennis courts and a croquet lawn were laid out in Dalby Square Gardens from at least 1885 and today the area is laid out as ornamental gardens.

Kent teams had played first-class matches on Dandelion Paddock in the Garlinge area to the west of Margate in the 1790s before the establishment of the first county club in 1842.
