= John Wood (Kent cricketer, born 1745) =

English cricketer (1745–1816)

Personal information
- Born: 1745
- Died: July 1816 (aged 70–71); Seal, Kent
- Role: Change bowler

Domestic team information
- Years: Team
- Kent

John Wood (1745 – July 1816 at Seal, Kent) was an English cricketer who played for Kent. His career began in the 1760s before statistics began to be recorded, and his known career spans the 1772 to 1783 seasons.

He has often been confused with his namesake who played for Surrey at the same time. Although Wood is credited with 12 appearances by CricketArchive, there are only 10 which can definitely be attributed to him. Using the data in Scores and Biographies, there were 12 matches in which a player known only as "Wood" took part, with Wood of Surrey specifically recorded in 13.

According to John Nyren, Wood of Kent was a "change bowler who was tall, stout, bony and a very good general player". According to H. T. Waghorn, he suffered a serious knee injury in 1773 and there were fears of amputation being necessary. However, he was playing again in 1774 so things cannot have been as bad as they first seemed.

The first time a John Wood is mentioned in the sources is when one plays for Caterham against Hambledon in 1769. This was probably the Surrey-based player. In the same season, a player called Wood played for the Duke of Dorset's XI against Wrotham in the minor match that featured John Minshull's century. Given Dorset's strong Kent connection, this was probably John Wood of Kent.

== Bibliography ==
- Arthur Haygarth, Scores & Biographies, Volume 1 (1744-1826), Lillywhite, 1862
- John Nyren, The Cricketers of my Time (ed. Ashley Mote), Robson, 1998
- H T Waghorn, Cricket Scores, Notes, etc. (1730–1773), Blackwood, 1899
