= Richard May (cricketer) =

English cricketer (died c.1796)

Richard May (died c.1796) was a cricketer who was a well-known bowler for Kent in the 1760s and 1770s. May's known career spanned the 1773 and 1780 seasons. His brother Tom May was a noted batsman, also playing for Kent at the same time.

The May brothers often played alongside each other but many scorecards of the period did not note first names or initials, so it is often impossible to distinguish one from the other in some matches, hence his total of 13 appearances, given in CricketArchive, is an estimate.

Scores and Biographies has recorded an old verse about the May brothers:

Tom was for batting, Dick for bowling famed

Very little is known of their personal lives.

Dick May is known to have been a gamekeeper on Sir Horatio Mann’s estate at Bourne Park House. He died in a drunken fit about 1796, when he was middle-aged. His dying request to his friend George Ring was that Ring should kill his favourite dog and bury it with him.

== Bibliography ==
- Arthur Haygarth, Scores & Biographies, Volume 1 (1744–1826), Lillywhite, 1862
