= Dandelion Paddock =

Former cricket ground in Dent de Lion, Kent

Dandelion Paddock cricket ground
- Interactive map of Dandelion Paddock cricket ground
- Location: Margate, Kent
- Coordinates: 51.378°N 1.350°E (approx.)
- Home club: Sir Horatio Mann's XI
- County club: Kent (pre-county club)
- Establishment: 1789
- Last used: 1806

Dandelion Paddock was a cricket ground in Dent de Lion west of Margate, Kent. Sir Horatio Mann organised a number of matches there in the 1790s.

== Location ==
The paddock was sited in the grounds of Dent de Lion, also known as Dandelion, in Garlinge, now a suburb located 1.5 miles (2.4 km) south-west of Margate. The estate was established around a former manor house in the 12th or 13th century by the family of Dent de Lyon. It was owned by Charles James Fox for many years until his death in 1806. The only remaining evidence of the estate is a 15th-century gatehouse.

== Matches ==
The grounds had been converted into a resort and tea garden by the time cricket matches were held there and had become very popular with residents of Margate and nearby Ramsgate.

The earliest known match at Dandelion Paddock was in September 1789 when Mann's East Kent played a team from the Isle of Thanet. In September 1795, it became an important venue when Mann staged three successive matches featuring his own XI. Two further games took place in 1796.

The ground is last known to have been used on 15 September 1806 when Lord Frederick Beauclerk's XI defeated Edward Bligh's XI by 53 runs. Kent also used the New Cricket Ground in Cliftonville to the east of Margate for one match in 1864.
