= Henry Rowett =

English cricketer

Henry Rowett (dates unknown) was an English amateur cricketer who played for Surrey during the 1760s. He was chiefly noted for his patronage of Caterham Cricket Club which was prominent between 1767 and 1770. Nothing is known of Rowett apart from his involvement in cricket matches.

Rowett is first mentioned in August 1767 in connection with a match between his Surrey and Sir Horace Mann's XI. In the Caterham v Bourne match at Caterham Common on 10 June 1768, Rowett showed himself to be a capable batsman by scoring 30 in Caterham's total of 150, Caterham winning the match by 14 runs. This match has left one of the earliest known scorecards, printed in the 11 June 1768 edition of the Kentish Weekly Post. Despite the match title, it was effectively Surrey v Kent.

Another Caterham v Bourne match took place at Caterham Common on 26 July 1768. The result is unknown. It was announced in the St James Chronicle on Saturday 23 July. Caterham was to give Bourne two men. The St James Chronicle referred to the teams as "Mr Horatio Mann's Club" and "Mr Henry Rowett's Club". A further match between the two teams took place at Caterham on 2 August 1768.

On 31 July and 1 August 1769, Rowett captained Caterham against Hambledown in a match at Guildford Bason. The match was reported by the Reading Mercury to have attracted a crowd of "near 20,000" and "it is generally allowed by the best judges to have been the finest match that ever was played".
