= William Hogsflesh =

English cricketer (1744–1818)

William Hogsflesh (1744–1818) was an English cricketer who played for the Hambledon Club during the 1760s and 1770s.

His career ended in 1775 and he was a well-known bowler, probably of quick medium pace, but his best years were before the sport's statistical record begins in 1772 and most of his records are lost.

Hogsflesh was noted in The Cricketers of My Time as one of the corps de reserve or change bowlers to Thomas Brett and Richard Nyren. He is said to have had "a high delivery with a generally good length".

He made 11 known appearances during 1772–1775.
