= Caterham Common =

Cricket venue in Surrey, England

Caterham Common cricket ground
- Location: Caterham, Surrey
- Coordinates: 51.289°N 0.101°W
- Home club: Caterham Cricket Club
- Establishment: c. 1765
- Last used: 1931

Caterham Common near Caterham in Surrey was the venue for three historic cricket matches played from 1767 to 1769. In the 18th century, it was the home venue of the Caterham Cricket Club, run by Henry Rowett.
