= Thomas May (cricketer) =

English cricketer in the 18th century

Thomas ("Tom") May (dates unknown) was a cricketer who was a well-known batsman for Kent in the 1760s and 1770s. May's known career spanned the 1772 and 1773 seasons.

His brother Dick May was a noted bowler, also playing for Kent at the same time.

The May brothers often played alongside each other but many scorecards of the period did not note first names or initials, so it is often impossible to distinguish one from the other in some matches. Using the data in Scores and Biographies, there were 5 matches in which a player known only as "May" took part while Dick May is specifically recorded in 8 and his brother Tom in 5. CricketArchive also has Tom May appearing in 5 matches.

Scores and Biographies has recorded an old verse about the May brothers:

Tom was for batting, Dick for bowling famed

Very little is known of their personal lives. Of Tom May, nothing is known at all.

== Bibliography ==
- Arthur Haygarth, Scores & Biographies, Volume 1 (1744–1826), Lillywhite, 1862
