= Coulsdon Cricket Club =

Historical English cricket team

Coulsdon Cricket Club was an English cricket club based at Coulsdon, Surrey. The club is believed to have been formed in the early 1760s, and it had for a time a great rivalry with Chertsey Cricket Club. One of the club's most notable players was Will Palmer.

== History ==
Coulsdon is first recorded as a team in May 1769 when a combined Coulsdon and Caterham team played England at Smitham Bottom in nearby Croydon.

In most of Coulsdon's matches, the result is unknown, but the team did defeat Sussex in 1775. In September of the same year, Coulsdon played Chertsey at Laleham Burway, and were beaten by 172 runs. The club's last known match in 1784 was also against Chertsey at Laleham Burway, and they lost that by 313 runs.

== Bibliography ==
- Buckley, G. B. (1935). Fresh Light on 18th Century Cricket. Birmingham: Cotterell & Co. OCLC 23450280.
