= Thomas Ridge (cricketer) =

English cricketer

Thomas Ridge (c. 1737 – 3 February 1801, Kimpston, Hampshire) was a prominent member of the Hambledon Club and played in a number of its cricket matches, including 6 known appearances for Hampshire between 1768 and 1775.

Ridge, a country squire, was well known in hunting circles and established a hunt at Kilmiston, Hampshire, in 1780.
