= Bourne Park House =

Country house in Kent, England

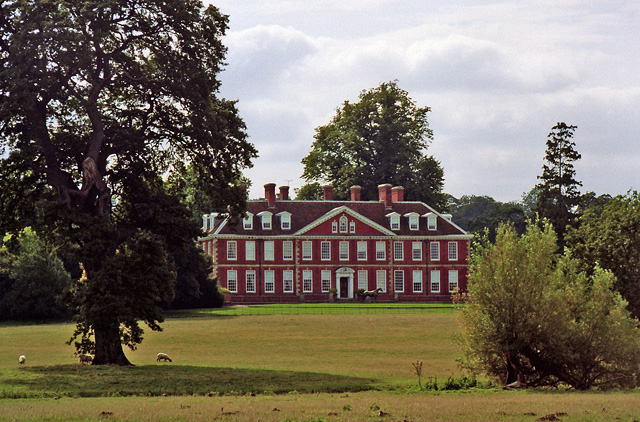

- Location within Kent
- 51.23560°N 1.12322°E

History
- Built: 1704

Listed Building – Grade I
- Official name: Bourne Park House
- Designated: 21 September 1960
- Reference no.: 1298969

Listed Building – Grade II
- Official name: Ice House at Bourne Park House
- Designated: 15 January 1986
- Reference no.: 1085727

Listed Building – Grade II
- Official name: Bridge in the grounds of Bourne Park House
- Designated: 21 September 1960
- Reference no.: 1085728

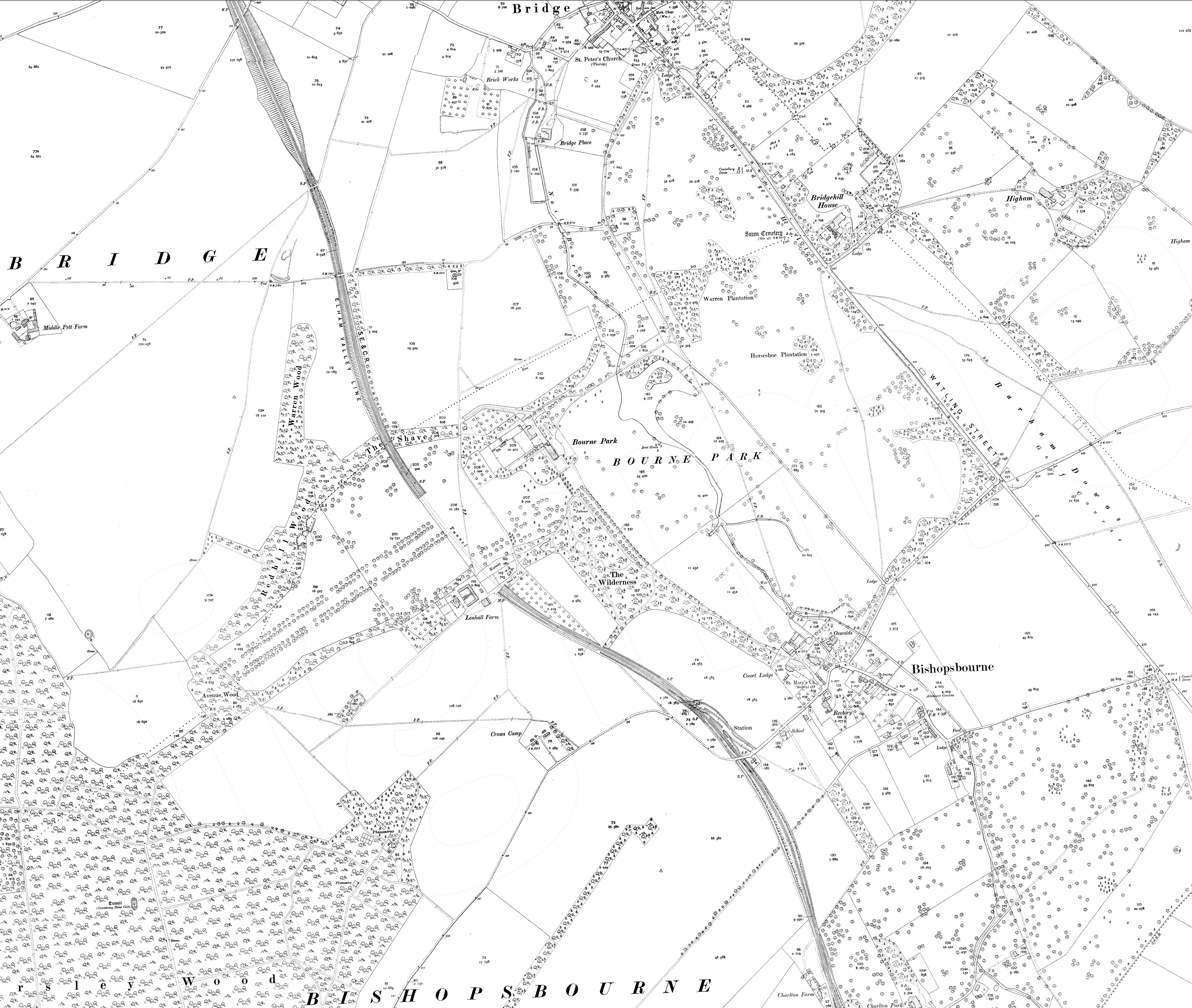
Bourne Park (centre) on a 1907 Ordnance Survey map.

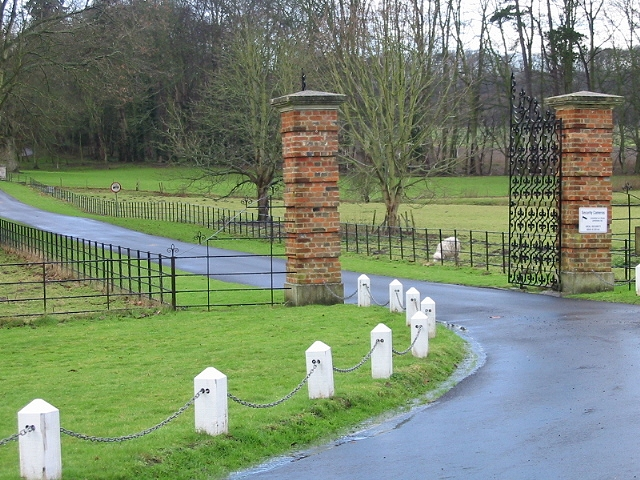
Gateway

Bourne Park House is a Queen Anne style country house on Bourne Park Road, between Bishopsbourne and Bridge near Canterbury in Kent. Built in 1701, it has been listed Grade I listed on the National Heritage List for England since 1954. An 18th-century red-brick ice house and a bridge that spans the Nailbourne that feeds the lake in the grounds of Bourne Park are both Grade II listed.

Originally known as Bourne Place, the present house was commissioned by Elizabeth Aucher, the widow of Sir Anthony Aucher. Built in place of an existing building belonging to the Bourne family, it is large red brick rectangular mansion of two storeys with attic and basement and a hipped tile roof. There is a 13 bay frontage, of which the central 5 bays project surmounted by a pediment containing a Venetian window. The interior, altered in 1848, contains a good 18th-century staircase, panelling and ceilings.

The house is surrounded by parkland of which all but the adjacent 3.6 hectares (9 acres) are now separately owned. Notable features of the gardens are the 18th-century lime avenue, the yew walk and fine examples of Wellingtonia and cork oak. Some trees were lost in the storm of October 1987. There is also a private cricket ground, known historically as Bishopsbourne Paddock.

Bourne Park is a site for ongoing archaeological research by the University of Cambridge. Several reports have been published to describe findings which include both archaeological features and artefacts. The evidence suggests usage of the area dating from the Bronze Age. The earliest artefact found is an Iron Age silver coin and there have been numerous findings associated with Roman Britain.

== History ==
Lady Aucher built and maintained the house during the minority of her only son, Sir Hewitt Aucher, Bt, passing it over to him in 1708. He left it to his elder sister, from whom it passed by marriage to the Beckingham family. After spending the night in nearby Canterbury, Leopold Mozart, his wife Anna Maria, and their children Maria Anna and Wolfgang Amadeus, spent the last week of July 1765 at the house as part of the English leg of their European grand tour before their departure for the Hague. The Mozarts were visiting Sir Horatio Mann, Bt. who had leased the house. Mann was an avid cricketer and a number of top-class cricket matches were held between 1766 and 1790 at the Bishopsbourne Paddock ground which he built in the park. In 1844 it was sold to Matthew Bell (1817-1903), in 1927 to Major Sir John Prestige.

The poet and architectural critic John Betjeman listed Bourne Park as one of the "casualty list of attractive English buildings to be destroyed" in his 'City and Suburban' column in The Spectator in February 1956. A 1965 article in Country Life described the estate as possessing 57 acres, and noted Prestige's extensive renovations, but said that the house had been "unoccupied in recent years and now needs to be restored and modernised". It was sold in the 1960s to Richard Neame who sold the house to a monastic community in 1976. It was subsequently sold c.1982 to Lady Juliet Wentworth-Fitzwilliam, then wife of Somerset de Chair, MP and now of Christopher Tadgell.

The house is home to the Fitzwilliam Collection, a notable private art collection that Lady Juliet has inherited as a descendant of the Earls Fitzwilliam. The collection was formerly housed at Wentworth Woodhouse, the Fitzwilliam's former seat in South Yorkshire. The collection is not on public display and pieces are rarely loaned to public collections. Among the collection are portraits by Anthony van Dyck and Joshua Reynolds and works by the equine artist George Stubbs. The collection also includes a copy of John James Audubon's monograph The Birds of America. Lady Juliet's daughter, Helena (née de Chair) is married to the Conservative politician Jacob Rees-Mogg. He proposed to her in front of one of the six Van Dyck paintings at the house.
