= Bourne Cricket Club =

Historical English cricket team

Bourne Cricket Club was based at Bishopsbourne, near Canterbury in Kent, and played several major matches in the 18th century when it was one of the teams which effectively represented Kent as a county. Its home venue was Bishopsbourne Paddock. Bourne was patronised by Sir Horatio Mann, owner of the Bourne Park House estate, and was in reality his own private club. When Sir Horatio relocated to Dandelion, near Margate, the Bourne club ceased to exist.

== History ==
Bourne is first recorded as a cricket team on Monday 29 September 1766 when it played Dartford at Bishopsbourne Paddock. Details of the match, including the result, are unknown.

Bourne played Surrey at Bishopsbourne in August 1767 and again in August 1768. Earlier in the 1768 season, Bourne played three matches against Henry Rowett's Caterham Cricket Club. The last match in which the Bourne club is named as a participant is Bourne v. Middlesex & Surrey at Bishopsbourne in August 1771, the combined team winning by a single run.

Sir Horatio continued to raise his own team for many years and Bishopsbourne Paddock was a regular venue for major matches until 1790. It is no longer in use as a cricket ground. A modern cricket club, Bishopsbourne Cricket Club, played matches on a ground at Charlton Park to the south of Bourne Park. This ground is still in use.
