= Richard Simmons (cricketer) =

English cricketer (1737–1802)

Richard Simmons (1737–1802) was an English cricketer who played during the 1770s. He is one of the earliest well-known wicket-keepers. Simmons was born and died at Bridge, Kent―he was christened in the village in October 1737 and buried there in November 1802. The earliest definite reference to him is in 1772, when he was 34.

He is known to have played in 13 important eleven-a-side matches from 1772 to 1779. Between 1773 and 1775 he played six times for Kent before playing twice for Surrey between 1778 and 1779. He also appeared for England (i.e., the "rest" of England) in four matches.

== Bibliography ==
- Ashley-Cooper, F. S. (1924). Hambledon Cricket Chronicle 1772–1796. Jenkins. ASIN B0008BXCH4.
- Carlaw, Derek (2020). Kent County Cricketers, A to Z: Part One (1806–1914) (PDF). Cardiff: ACS.
- Haygarth, Arthur (1862). Scores & Biographies, Volume 1 (1744–1826). Kennington: Frederick Lillywhite. ISBN 978-19-00592-23-9.
