= Chertsey Cricket Club =

Historical English cricket team

Chertsey Cricket Club, based at Chertsey in Surrey, is one of the oldest cricket clubs in England. Its own website dates its founding as 1737, but five matches involving a Chertsey team took place in 1736, and one in 1737. Chertsey had a top-class team in the 18th century, playing in some forty or more matches that are recognised as historically important. (Note: Any match listed in the ACS' Important Match Guide (1981) is historically important, and therefore of the highest standard, whether or not a scorecard might exist. The same applies to numerous matches discovered by researchers since 1981. For further information, see First-class cricket.)

The 18th century team played its home matches on the Laleham Burway ground in Chertsey. Its opponents included prominent clubs like Croydon, Dartford, Hambledon, and London, as well as county teams and England. Chertsey produced several famous players in the 18th century, including William Yalden, Lumpy Stevens, Thomas Quiddington, and John Wood. The club's main patron was Charles Bennet, 4th Earl of Tankerville, who was a keen player, and apparently a good fielder.

== Modern club ==
Today, the Chertsey club is based at the Sir Edward Stern Sports Ground, and its team plays in the Surrey County League.

== Bibliography ==
- ACS (1981). A Guide to Important Cricket Matches Played in the British Isles 1709–1863. Nottingham: ACS. OCLC 85045528.
- ACS (1982). A Guide to First-class Cricket Matches Played in the British Isles. Nottingham: ACS. OCLC 10586869.
- Buckley, G. B. (1935). Fresh Light on 18th Century Cricket. Birmingham: Cotterell & Co. OCLC 23450280.
- Haygarth, Arthur (1996) [1862]. Scores & Biographies, Volume 1 (1744–1826). Kennington: Frederick Lillywhite. ISBN 978-19-00592-23-9.
- Major, John (2007). More Than A Game. London: HarperCollins. ISBN 978-00-07183-64-7 – via Internet Archive.
- Maun, Ian (2009). From Commons to Lord's, Volume One: 1700 to 1750. Cambridge: Roger Heavens. ISBN 978-19-00592-52-9.
- Maun, Ian (2011). From Commons to Lord's, Volume Two: 1751 to 1770. Leicester: Martin Wilson. ISBN 978-09-56906-60-1.
- Waghorn, H. T. (1899). Cricket Scores, Notes, &c. From 1730–1773. Edinburgh: Blackwood. OCLC 1086375331.
- Waghorn, H. T. (2005) [1906]. The Dawn of Cricket. London: J. W. McKenzie. ISBN 978-09-47821-17-3.
