= Caterham Cricket Club =

Historical English cricket team

Caterham Cricket Club, based at Caterham in Surrey, was briefly a top-class cricket team, playing ten known matches from 1767 to 1770 which are recognised as historically important. (Note: Any match listed in the ACS' Important Match Guide (1981) is historically important, and therefore of the highest standard, whether or not a scorecard might exist. The same applies to numerous matches discovered by researchers since 1981. For further information, see First-class cricket.)

Caterham at that time was effectively representative of Surrey as a county. Its home venue was on Caterham Common. The club was patronised by Henry Rowett, a prominent landowner in the area, and was in reality his own private club. Six of their matches were against Hambledon, and three against Bourne. In the other match, Caterham combined with Coulsdon Cricket Club to play against the Rest of England.

== Important matches ==
Caterham is first recorded as a top-class team on about 21 September 1767 when it played Hambledon at Duppas Hill, and was heavily beaten by 262 runs. Two unidentified Hambledon batters had a partnership worth 192. Caterham's last major match in 1770 was also against Hambledon, and they lost that by 57 runs.

== Players ==
Several well known Surrey players were members of the Caterham teams, including Lumpy Stevens, Will Palmer, Thomas Quiddington, and John Wood.

== Modern club ==
There is a modern Caterham Cricket Club, whose origins are in the 1870s. Its team plays in the Surrey County League.

== Bibliography ==
- ACS (1981). A Guide to Important Cricket Matches Played in the British Isles 1709–1863. Nottingham: ACS. OCLC 85045528.
- Maun, Ian (2011). From Commons to Lord's, Volume Two: 1751 to 1770. Leicester: Martin Wilson. ISBN 978-09-56906-60-1.
- Waghorn, H. T. (1899). Cricket Scores, Notes, &c. From 1730–1773. Edinburgh: Blackwood. OCLC 1086375331.
