= Guildford Bason =

Former cricket ground on Merrow Down, England

Coordinates: 51.236°N 0.540°W

Guildford Bason cricket ground
- Interactive map of Guildford Bason cricket ground
- Location: Guildford, Surrey
- Home club: Guildford Cricket Club
- County club: Surrey
- Establishment: by 1730
- Last used: 1786

Guildford Bason (or Basin) is a former cricket ground on Merrow Down, on the outskirts of Guildford, Surrey.

Cricket was played on the ground between 1730 and 1786.

Sussex lawyer John Baker, a regular spectator at Georgian matches, described some of the matches held in his diary. One is the England v Hampshire game in July 1772 which Baker attended with his parson friend, John Woodward. He writes that Hambledon was already batting when they arrived. It was a cheerful scene and "the Basin on Merrow Down" was ringed by a big crowd of spectators, most of them standing.
