= Sir Horatio Mann, 2nd Baronet =

English politician and cricketer (1744–1814)

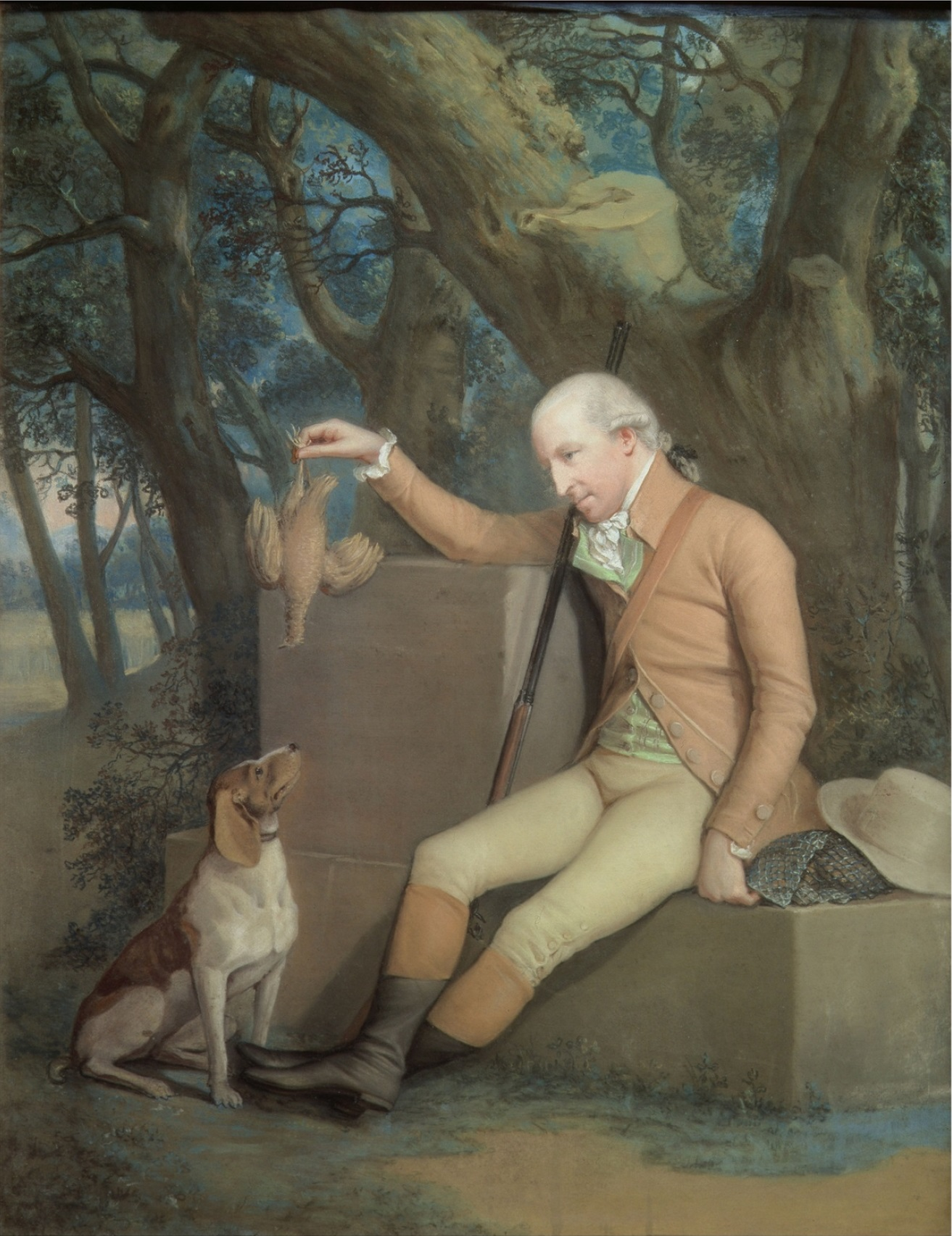
Horatio Mann and his Hound by Hugh Douglas Hamilton.

Sir Horatio (Horace) Mann, 2nd Baronet (2 February 1744 – 2 April 1814) was a British politician who sat in the House of Commons between 1774 and 1807. He is remembered as a member of the Hambledon Club in Hampshire and a patron of Kent cricket. He was an occasional player but rarely in important matches.

== Early life ==
Mann was the only surviving son of Galfridus Mann, an army clothier, of Boughton Place in Boughton Malherbe, Kent and his wife, Sarah Gregory, daughter of John Gregory of London. He was educated at Charterhouse School and entered Peterhouse, Cambridge in 1760. His father died on 21 December 1756 and he succeeded to his estates at Boughton and Linton. He also inherited over £100,000 from his father. Mann married Lady Lucy Noel, daughter of Baptist Noel, 4th Earl of Gainsborough, on 13 April 1765.

== Cricket ==
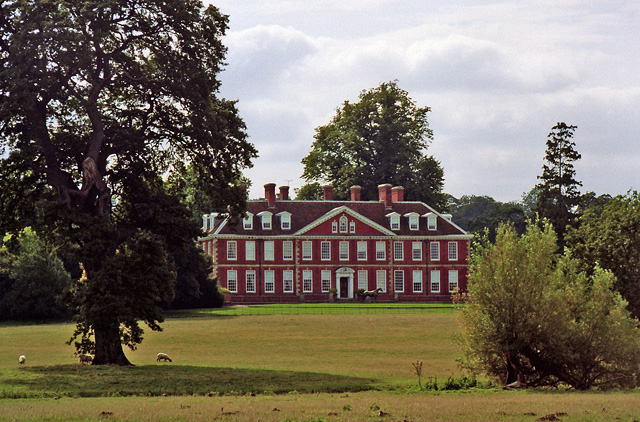
Bourne Park House

Mann had a number of influential friends including John Frederick Sackville, 3rd Duke of Dorset, with whom he shared a keen cricketing rivalry. He owned Boughton Place in Boughton Malherbe and Linton Park in Linton, both near Maidstone, and later had his family seat at Bourne Park House, near Canterbury. Within its grounds he had his own cricket ground Bishopsbourne Paddock which staged many matches in the 1770s and 1780s. He later moved to Dandelion, Kent, near Margate, and established another ground there which was used for some games towards the end of the 18th century.

Mann was a member of the Committee of Noblemen and Gentlemen of Kent, Hampshire, Surrey, Sussex, Middlesex, and London. He was also a member of the committee at The Star and Garter in Pall Mall, which drew up a new revision of the Laws of Cricket on 25 February 1774.

== Political career ==
Mann was nephew of Sir Horace Mann, 1st Baronet who was a British diplomat in Tuscany from 1738 to 1786. He was knighted on 10 June 1772, to act as proxy for his uncle at the installation of the Bath.

Mann's ownership of Linton gave him electoral interest at Maidstone. At the 1774 general election he contested Maidstone, having deferred a planned journey abroad for his wife's health. He topped the poll and was returned as Member of Parliament for the seat. In 1775 his uncle made over to him the family estate at Bourne, in return for an annuity. He did go abroad and after visiting France, Tuscany, and Austria, returned to England in November 1778. From then on he travelled to his uncle in Florence nearly every summer. At the 1780 general election he was again returned for Maidstone at the head of the poll. He joined Brooks in 1780, and was a member of the St. Alban's Tavern group of country gentlemen who tried to reconcile Fox and Pitt. He did not stand in the 1784 general election.

Mann was in Florence when his uncle died on 6 November 1786 and succeeded to the baronetcy as second baronet. He acted as chargé d'affaires in Florence for six months. He was angered by the poor recompense he received for his services and returned to Italy in 1788 ostensibly to sort out the financial problems which resulted from running his uncle's establishment.

Mann joined the Whig Club in January 1790 and at the following 1790 general election was elected in a contest as MP for Sandwich. He was returned unopposed in 1796 and 1802. By this time he was becoming increasingly absent in parliament mainly through ill-health when gout struck him. He avoided a contest and was returned in the 1806 general election, but was defeated in 1807.

== Later life and legacy ==
Mann was described by Samuel Egerton Brydges as "a wild, fickle, rattling man, who made no impression". In 1811, it was said that his estate would have been the largest in Kent but, by his extravagance, he reduced his income to not more than £4,000 a year. He died on 2 April 1814. He had three daughters, but no son, and so the baronetcy became extinct. His property went to his nephew James Cornwallis. Cornwallis's father wrote soon after: "My son has had a great deal of trouble in consequence of succeeding a person really ruined. The sums Sir Horace expended are beyond all belief, or rather squandered".

Mann is variously called Sir Horatio and Sir Horace in the sources. Horace was used as a diminutive of Horatio so both names can be regarded as correct usage. He was always called Sir Horace in Scores and Biographies, the main source for his cricketing activities.

== Bibliography ==
- Haygarth, Arthur (1996) [1862]. Scores & Biographies, Volume 1 (1744–1826). Kennington: Frederick Lillywhite. ISBN 978-19-00592-23-9.

Parliament of Great Britain
Preceded by Charles Marsham; Robert Gregory	Member of Parliament for Maidstone; 1774–1784; With: Lord Guernsey 1774–1777; Charles Finch 1777–1780; Clement Taylor 1780–1784	Succeeded by Sir Gerard Noel; Clement Taylor
Preceded by Sir Philip Stephens; Charles Brett	Member of Parliament for Sandwich; 1790–1800; With: Sir Philip Stephens	Succeeded by Parliament of the United Kingdom
Parliament of the United Kingdom
Preceded by Parliament of Great Britain	Member of Parliament for Sandwich; 1801–1807; With: Sir Philip Stephens 1801–1806; Sir Thomas Fremantle 1806–1807	Succeeded by Peter Rainier; Charles Jenkinson
Baronetage of Great Britain
Preceded by Horace Mann	Baronet (of Linton Hall); 1786–1814	Extinct
