= Surrey county cricket team (pre-1846) =

Historical English cricket team

Surrey
Team information
- Established: before 1709
- Last match: 1845
- Home venue: Kennington Common; Guildford Bason; Moulsey Hurst

History
- Notable players: Lumpy Stevens; William Yalden; Will Palmer; Billy Beldham; John Wells

Until 1845, the Surrey county cricket team, always known as Surrey, was organised by individual patrons and other groups, particularly Chertsey Cricket Club in the 18th century, and by Montpelier Cricket Club in the 19th. The team played historically important matches (Note: Any match listed in the ACS' Important Match Guide (1981) is historically important, and therefore of the highest standard, whether or not a scorecard might exist. The same applies to numerous matches discovered by researchers since 1981. For further information, see First-class cricket.) from the early 18th century until the formation of Surrey County Cricket Club on 22 August 1845.

== 16th and 17th centuries ==
The first definite mention of cricket anywhere in the world is dated c.1550 in Guildford. Cricket became established in Surrey during the 17th century, and the earliest village matches took place before the English Civil War. It is believed that the earliest county teams were formed in the aftermath of the Restoration in 1660.

== 18th century ==
The first recorded inter-county match took place in 1709 between Kent and Surrey on Dartford Brent. Surrey held important status throughout the 18th century, depending on the quality of their opponents, largely due to the Chertsey Cricket Club, and famous patrons such as Charles Bennet, 4th Earl of Tankerville. Noted Surrey players included Lumpy Stevens, William Yalden, and Billy Beldham.

== 19th century ==
The present Surrey County Cricket Club was formed at a meeting which took place at the Horns Tavern in Kennington following a match between Gentlemen of Surrey and Players of Surrey at The Oval (in its initial season as a cricket ground) on 21 and 22 August 1845. The earliest important match at The Oval was Surrey Club v Marylebone Cricket Club (MCC) on 25 and 26 May 1846. Only 194 runs were scored in the match with a top score of 13. W. R. Hillyer took 14 wickets to help MCC win by 48 runs. Surrey County Cricket Club played its first important match v Kent at The Oval on 25 and 26 June 1846, winning by 10 wickets.

== Bibliography ==
- ACS (1981). A Guide to Important Cricket Matches Played in the British Isles 1709–1863. Nottingham: ACS. OCLC 85045528.
- ACS (1982). A Guide to First-class Cricket Matches Played in the British Isles. Nottingham: ACS. OCLC 10586869.
- Altham, H. S.; Swanton, E. W. (1962). A History of Cricket, Volume 1 (to 1914) (5th ed.). London: George Allen & Unwin. OCLC 894274808.
- Birley, Derek (1999). A Social History of English Cricket. London: Aurum Press. ISBN 978-18-54107-10-7 – via Internet Archive.
- Bowen, Rowland (1970). Cricket: A History of its Growth and Development. London: Eyre & Spottiswoode. ISBN 978-04-13278-60-9.
- Buckley, G. B. (1935). Fresh Light on 18th Century Cricket. Birmingham: Cotterell & Co. OCLC 23450280.
- Haygarth, Arthur (1997) [1862]. Scores & Biographies, Volume 2 (1827–1840). Kennington: Frederick Lillywhite. ISBN 978-19-00592-23-9.
- Major, John (2007). More Than A Game. London: HarperCollins. ISBN 978-00-07183-64-7 – via Internet Archive.
- Maun, Ian (2009). From Commons to Lord's, Volume One: 1700 to 1750. Cambridge: Roger Heavens. ISBN 978-19-00592-52-9.
- Maun, Ian (2011). From Commons to Lord's, Volume Two: 1751 to 1770. Leicester: Martin Wilson. ISBN 978-09-56906-60-1.
- McCann, Tim (2004). Sussex Cricket in the Eighteenth Century (PDF). Vol. 88. Lewes: West Sussex Record Office. ISBN 978-08-54450-55-8.
- Underdown, David (2000). Start of Play. Westminster: Allen Lane. ISBN 978-07-13993-30-1 – via Internet Archive.
- Waghorn, H. T. (1899). Cricket Scores, Notes, &c. From 1730–1773. Edinburgh: Blackwood. OCLC 1086375331.
- Waghorn, H. T. (2005) [1906]. The Dawn of Cricket. London: J. W. McKenzie. ISBN 978-09-47821-17-3.
- Webber, Roy (1960). The Phoenix History of Cricket. Charing Cross, London: Phoenix House Ltd. OCLC 5391059.
- Wilson, Martin (2005). An Index to Waghorn. London: Bodyline Books (limited edition, by subscription only).
