= H. T. Waghorn =

English cricket statistician and historian

Henry Thomas Waghorn (11 April 1842 – 30 January 1930), was a cricket statistician and historian. He is best known for his two classic researches into cricket's early history: The Dawn of Cricket and Cricket Scores, Notes, etc. (1730 - 1773).

Waghorn was born in Tunbridge Wells, Kent. He had a career in the Army and then obtained a post at the British Museum, where he was able to indulge his love of research into old newspapers and periodicals. Painstakingly, he assembled a mass of information from cricket notices, including some previously undiscovered match scores, which he eventually published in his two books. He died in Walmer, Kent.
