= History of English cricket (1726–1750) =

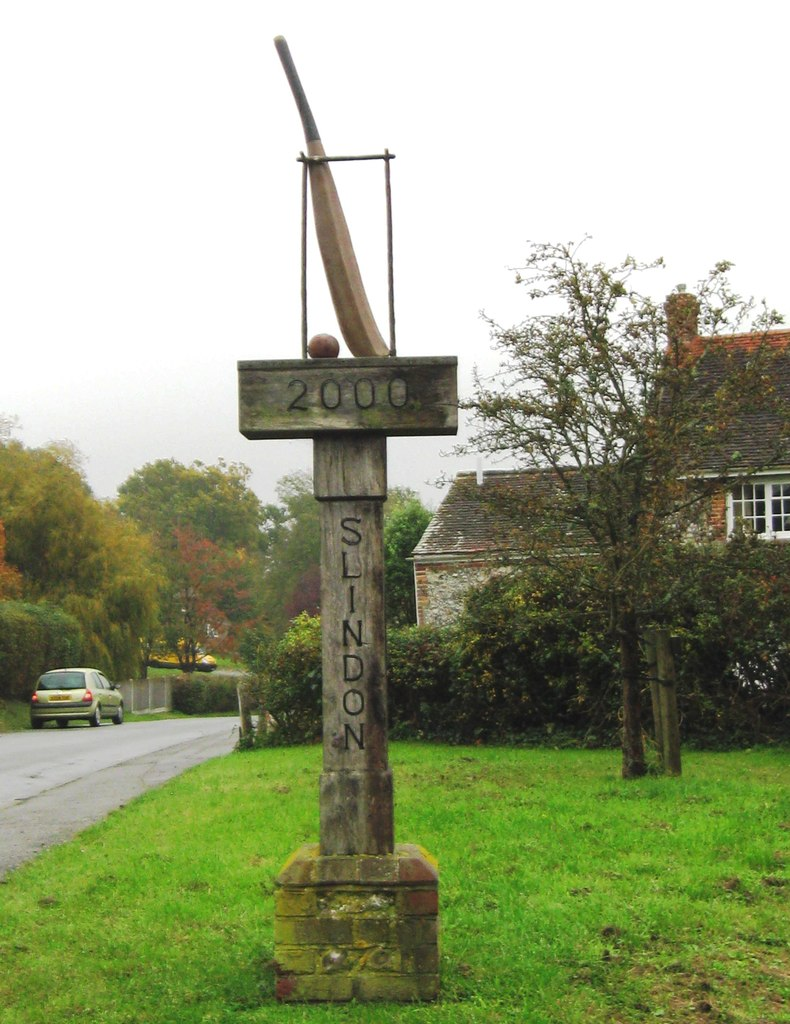
Slindon cricket sign, depicting the size and shape of the bat and wicket first used in Slindon in 1731.

In the years from 1726 to 1750, cricket became an established sport in London and the south-eastern counties of England. In 1726, it was already a thriving sport in the south east and, though limited by the constraints of travel at the time, it was slowly gaining adherents elsewhere with references being found in other southern counties. Having been essentially a rural pastime for well over a century, cricket became a focus for wealthy patrons and gamblers whose interests funded its growth throughout the 18th century.

Patrons such as the 2nd Duke of Richmond sought to ensure order both on and off the field of play. The earliest known written rules were deployed in 1727, but it was not until 1744 that the first code of laws was enacted. Ground enclosure began in 1731 and, later in the decade, admission fees were introduced. Media interest grew as the newspaper industry developed, a lead being taken by two new publications. London's Artillery Ground became the sport's showcase venue with important matches played in front of large crowds. The single wicket form enjoyed huge popularity through the 1740s until reaching its peak in 1748. Leading players of the period included Thomas Waymark of Sussex; Robert "Long Robin" Colchin of Bromley and Kent; and Richard Newland of Slindon and Sussex.

== Continuing growth of cricket ==
=== Regional, but also colonial ===
Cricket was still a regional sport in England, albeit a very popular one, as the constraints of travel limited its introduction to the rest of the country. It thrived on the funds provided by patronage, gambling, and large, enthusiastic crowds. As its popularity grew, cricket began to spread outwards from its south-eastern heartland. The earliest references have been found of games being played in the traditional counties of Berkshire (1727), Gloucestershire (1729), Buckinghamshire (1730), Hampshire (1733), Essex (1737), Hertfordshire (1737), Dorset (1738), Bedfordshire (1741), Huntingdonshire (1741), Northamptonshire (1741), Suffolk (1743), and Norfolk (1745).

Even so, cricket had already reached the Americas and India as confirmed by references to it being played overseas by English sailors and colonists in the first quarter of the 18th century.

=== Women's cricket ===
As in all fields of endeavour, it was difficult for women to partake in male-dominated pursuits. The earliest report of a women's match appeared in The Reading Mercury on 26 July 1745. The match was played on Gosden Common, near Guildford, between "XI Maids of Bramley" and "XI Maids of Hambledon". They all dressed in white, but the Hambledon girls wore red ribbons on their heads and the Bramley girls wore blue. The report says: "The Bramley girls got 119 notches and the Hambledon girls 127. There was of both sexes the greatest number that ever was seen on such an occasion. The girls bowled, batted, ran and catched as well as most men could do in that game". The villages were Bramley and Hambledon, both near Godalming in Surrey. A further report says the ladies played a return match at Hambledon, in Surrey, on 6 August.

On 13 July 1747, the Artillery Ground staged a match between a team from Charlton and another from West Dean, two neighbouring villages in West Sussex. There was crowd trouble which caused play to be abandoned. The intention was to continue next morning but no further reports have been found.

=== Educational links ===
A key factor in the growth of cricket was its introduction to schools and universities. In 1727, Horace Walpole commented that it was already "common" at Eton College—the earliest reference to it both at Eton and in the county of Berkshire. Earlier, the first mentions of the sport in each of Cambridgeshire, Hampshire, and Oxfordshire had related to its being played at, respectively, the University of Cambridge, Winchester College, and the University of Oxford. There were matches at Oxford in the summer of 1729, on the testimony of Dr Samuel Johnson, who was then a student. This was mentioned in James Boswell's Life of Samuel Johnson.

A schoolteacher in New Romney is credited with coining the word "cricketer" when completing a diary entry. He bestowed the accolade upon one William Pullen of Cranbrook but it was in connection with Pullen's death. He had just been hanged on Penenden Heath near Maidstone for stealing a sheep and five bushels of wheat.

== Coverage in the media and the arts ==
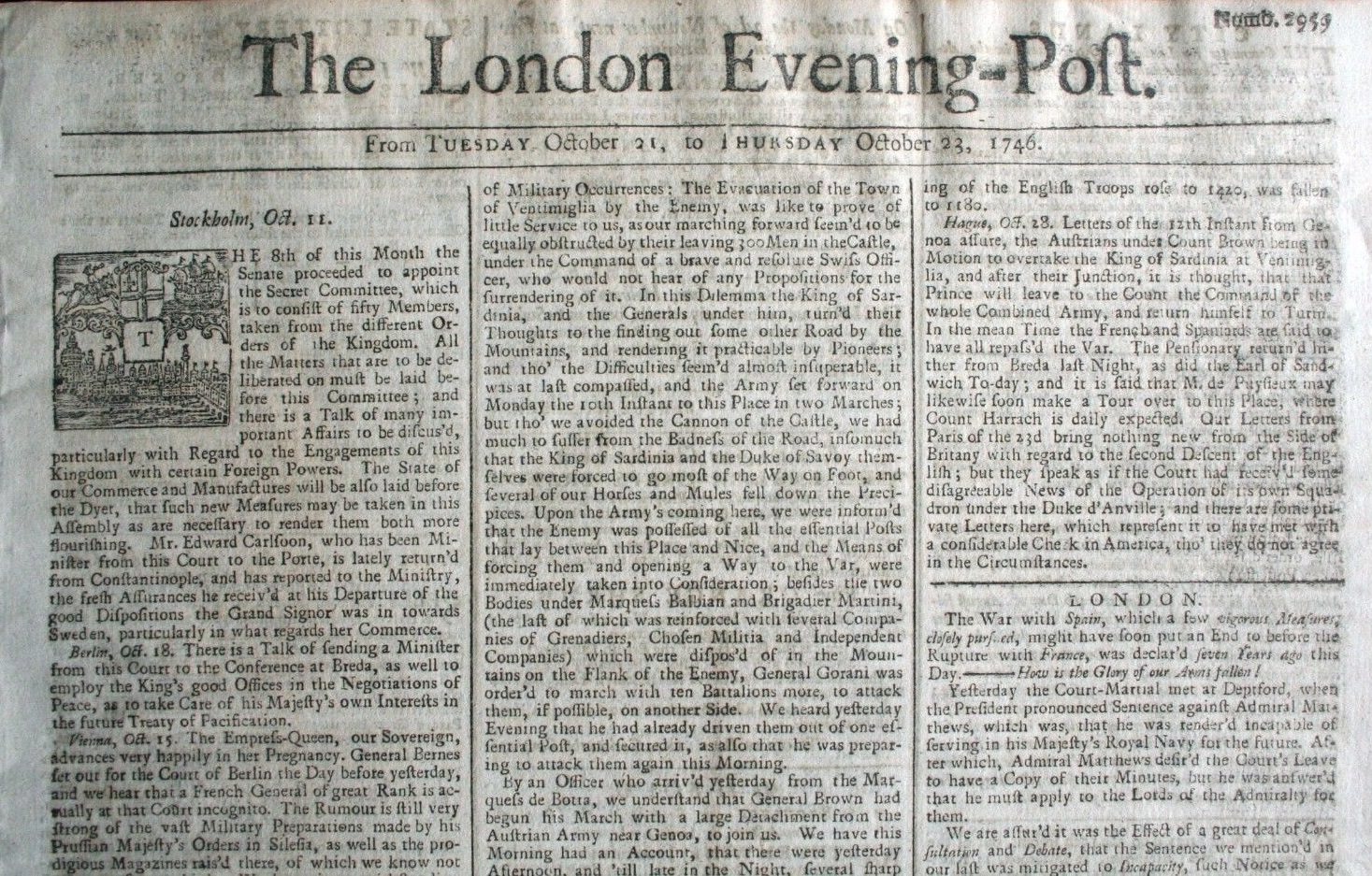
Front page of the London Evening Post for 21–23 October 1746

No cricket had been reported in the infant newspaper industry before 1697 due to the Licensing of the Press Act 1662 which controlled the press until 1696, but notices were becoming more frequent by the mid-1720s. Early notices tended to be either the announcement of a scheduled match or a brief summary of the gambling odds rather than the actual play. It was not until 1726 that players were first mentioned by name in a newspaper report. Only three notices were published in 1726, but this increased to nineteen in 1730. The London Evening Post was founded in 1726 and the Daily Advertiser (which had several changes of title) began publication in 1735; they carried a good many cricket notices until both ceased publication in 1797. Other newspapers included the General Evening Post, London Daily Post, St James Evening Post, and the Whitehall Evening Post. The early newspapers were not always correct, however, as in 1732 when twelve games were recorded, eleven involving the prominent London Cricket Club. A newspaper report in September stated that London played thirteen matches in all and were unbeaten, but that claim contradicted a report in May stating that Croydon defeated London "by great odds".

Surviving match scorecards have provided much-needed information about cricket in the last quarter of the eighteenth century, but only two are known to have been completed prior to 1750. These came from two matches in 1744. (Note: Any match listed in the ACS' Important Match Guide (1981) is historically important, and therefore of the highest standard, whether or not a scorecard might exist. The same applies to numerous matches discovered by researchers since 1981. For further information, see First-class cricket.)

Generally agreed to be the "first modern representation of cricket", a series of engravings, The Game of Cricket, was made by Hubert-François Gravelot in 1739. The six engravings show groups of children playing cricket, with a wicket of the "low stool" shape, probably 2-foot (0.61 m) wide by 1-foot (0.30 m) tall, with two stumps and a single bail. The engravings were used on porcelain. Gravelot helped to establish the French Rococo style in English publishing and was one of the most celebrated illustrators of the time.

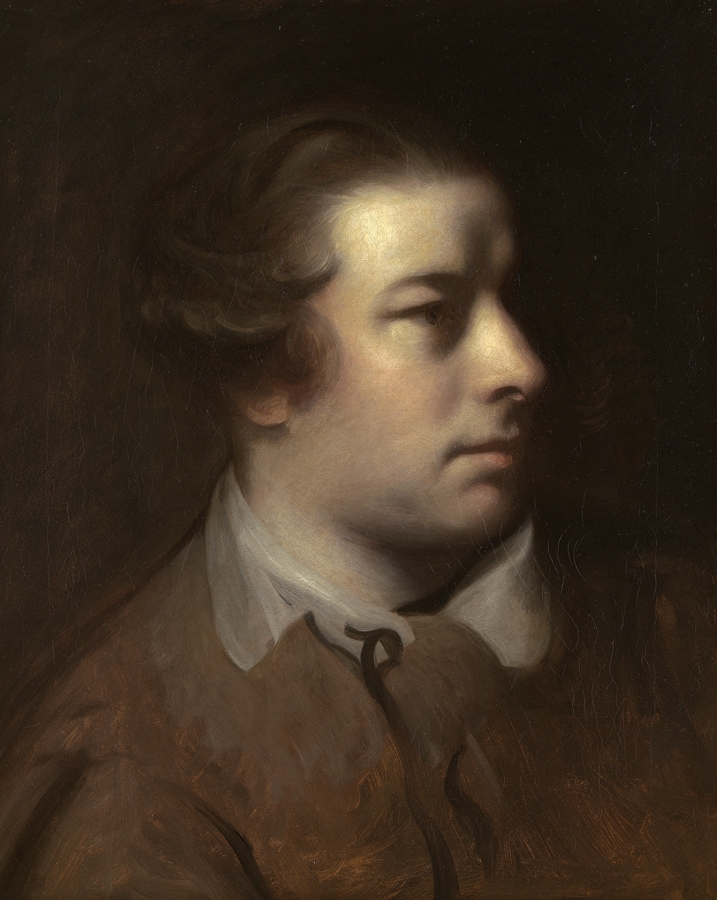
Portrait of Francis Hayman, by Sir Joshua Reynolds

The well known painting A Game of Cricket as played in the Artillery Ground by Francis Hayman (1708–1786) is now lost but it dated from this period. A 1743 engraving of it by Antoine Benoist has survived and now hangs at Lord's. It is widely thought to depict a game at the Artillery Ground, but that is not so because the Artillery Ground was walled around and this game is obviously being played on a common somewhere. The title is fair comment in that the painting shows cricket as played, not played. The picture shows a batsman with a bat shaped like a modern hockey stick. He is defending a two-stump wicket and is ready to try and hit the ball, which has been bowled using an underarm action. In the foreground is a Scorer notching the tally. Also from 1743 comes An Exact Representation of the Game of Cricket by Louis Philippe Boitard (c. 1733 – c. 1767). It is a birdseye view showing all eleven fielders as well as two batsmen, two umpires and two scorers. This now hangs in the Tate Gallery.

The England versus Kent match at the Artillery Ground on 18 June 1744 was described by the London Daily Advertiser as the "greatest cricket match ever known". It was a noted social occasion as the spectators included the Prince of Wales and his brother, Prince William, Duke of Cumberland. Also present were the 2nd Duke of Richmond and Admiral Vernon. The poet James Love (1722–1774) commemorated the match in his Cricket: An Heroic Poem (1745), written in rhyming couplets. The poem is one of the first substantial pieces of literature about cricket.

== Patronage and players ==
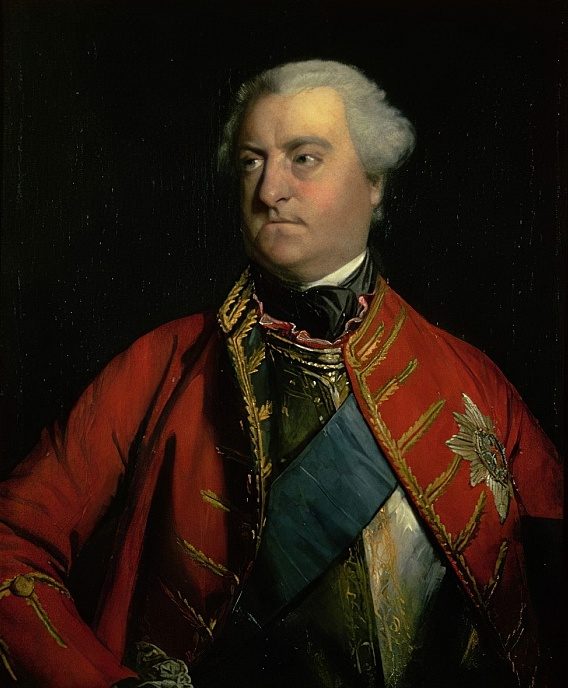
Charles Spencer, 3rd Duke of Marlborough, a prominent cricket patron

The most prominent patrons in the 1720s were Edwin Stead (Kent), who died on 28 August 1735; the 2nd Duke of Richmond and Sir William Gage (both Sussex); and Alan Brodrick (Surrey). Gage and Richmond continued to support cricket through the 1730s, when additional patrons were Frederick, Prince of Wales, and Lord John Sackville (father of cricketer and patron, the 3rd Duke of Dorset). Richmond, having adopted the famous Slindon team of the 1740s, continued his patronage through that decade until his death on 8 August 1750.

Patrons of the 1740s included Charles Spencer, 3rd Duke of Marlborough; John Russell, 4th Duke of Bedford, who organised matches at Woburn Abbey; George Montagu-Dunk, 2nd Earl of Halifax, in Northamptonshire; John Montagu, 4th Earl of Sandwich, in Huntingdonshire; Richard Grenville, in Buckinghamshire; and Lord Montfort, who led a combined London, Middlesex, and Surrey team in 1743. In a 1742 letter to Mr Richard West, the poet Thomas Gray said: "There is my Lords *** and ***, they are Statesmen; Do not you remember them dirty boys playing at cricket"? The cricket historian F. S. Ashley-Cooper believed the two "noble lords" to have been Bedford and Sandwich.

Following William Bedle in the first quarter of the century, an outstanding player of the 1720s and 1730s was Thomas Waymark. He was a groom employed by Richmond, and was perhaps the first great all-rounder. Other players named in the 1730s include "the famous" Tim Coleman; Cook, of Brentford Cricket Club, described as "one of the best bowlers in England"; Ellis, of London, who was their "best bowler"; and John Bowra, of Bromley Cricket Club, known as the "Kentish Shepherd". Researcher G. B. Buckley believed him to be the father of William Bowra.

Wider coverage in the 1740s, especially the two 1744 scorecards, has meant a substantial increase in the number of known players from that decade. Foremost among them were Robert "Long Robin" Colchin of Bromley and Richard Newland of Slindon. Other highly rated players included Newland's brothers, John and Adam. Brothers were a common feature of 1740s cricket. There were two London players called Bennett, known as "Little" and "Tall", who were probably brothers. Both were "reckoned as good a bat as Colchin". Two of Colchin's Bromley colleagues were John Bryant and his brother James. John and Joe Harris played for Addington Cricket Club and Surrey; John and Thomas Bell for Dartford and Kent.

Other top players were Edward Aburrow Sr, known as "Cuddy", a notorious smuggler who was also an outstanding bowler for Slindon; Stephen Dingate, who was a barber by trade; Tom Faulkner, also well known as a prizefighter called "Long Tom"; and William Sawyer of Richmond. Players from Kent included John Cutbush of Maidstone; William Hodsoll of Dartford; and Val Romney of Sevenoaks. There was also John Frame, only 16 when his career began in 1749, who went on to become one of the first great fast bowlers.

== Single wicket ==
=== 1726–1740 ===
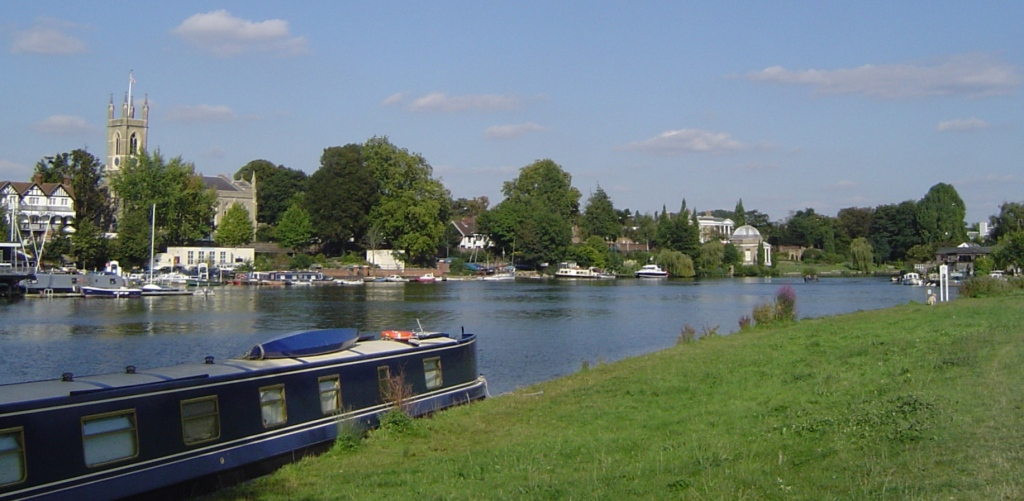
The River Thames at Moulsey Hurst, a popular sporting venue in the 18th century.

The London Evening Post dated Saturday, 27 August 1726, carried an advertisement for a single wicket match between players called "the noted Perry" (of London) and "the famous Piper" (of Hampton), playing "for twenty pounds a side". The match was played at Moulsey Hurst, a multi-sport venue near Molesey in Surrey; this is the first time that players are known to have been named in a newspaper, and the match itself is the earliest known to have been played under single wicket rules.

There were four single wicket matches in the 1730 season, three of which involved four-man Kent led by Edwin Stead in matches against four of Brentford Cricket Club. The other game was between three of Surrey and three of Sussex. The stake was usually £50 (approximately £9,267 in present-day terms).

In August 1735, there was a three against four match (result unknown) on Kennington Common, all the players being members of the London club. In 1736, there were two significant matches. In one of them, cricket's earliest known tied match result occurred. The teams, three of London and three of Surrey, aggregated 23 runs each. The other match was between two London players, named as Wakeland and George Oldner, and an unnamed pair from Richmond who were "esteemed the best two in England". One of the Richmond players suffered a serious facial injury when hit by the ball.

In August 1737, two unnamed players, one from Wandsworth and one from Mitcham, described as "two of the most celebrated sportsmen in the game", played a match on Kennington Common. The Mitcham man was hit by the ball in his first innings and concussed for a time. He continued but was "beaten by a considerable number of notches".

=== 1741–1746 ===
A three-a-side match at the Artillery Ground on 11 July 1743 featured six players billed as "the best in England". Richard Newland, William Sawyer, and John Bryant played as Three of England; William Hodsoll, John Cutbush, and Val Romney as Three of Kent. Hodsoll and Newland were the team captains. A notice in the Daily Advertiser of 7 July said that Thomas Ridgeway of Sussex was to play alongside Hodsoll and Romney. Then, on 8 July, Cutbush was named instead of Ridgeway. Three of Kent won the match by 2 runs, with The London Evening Post estimating the spectating crowd to be 10,000; a return match was arranged at Sevenoaks Vine a few days later, but it was cancelled.

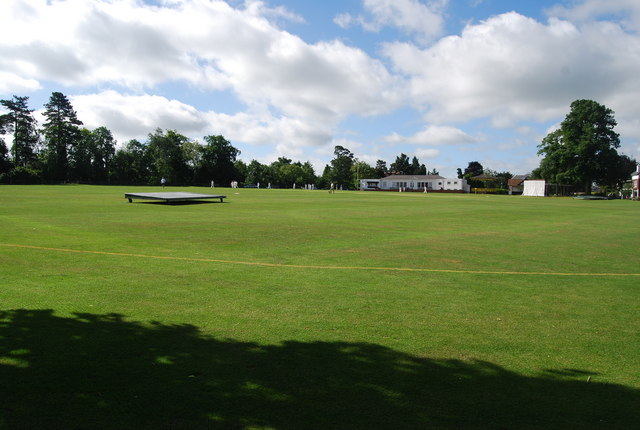
Sevenoaks Vine cricket ground (pictured in 2008)

In August 1743, "considerable sums" were at stake for two five-a-side games between Richmond and London. The first was on Richmond Green, and the return on the Artillery Ground. The match results are unknown.

In June 1744, there was a one-a-side match between two unnamed players "for a considerable sum of money, in order to determine finally who is the best player". In August, there was another one-a-side match "for a large sum" between a Sevenoaks player and a London player. On 17 September, a three-a-side match was billed as "Long Robin's Side v R. Newland's Side". The participants were described as the six best players in England. The teams were Robert Colchin ("Long Robin"), Val Romney, and John Bryant against Richard Newland, Edward Aburrow Sr and Joe Harris. Aburrow replaced John Mills, called the "famous Kent bowler", who was originally chosen. The stake was two hundred guineas. There was another "threes" match on 1 October, again "for a considerable sum" – Robert Colchin, James Bryant, and Joe Harris played against John Bryant, Val Romney and Thomas Waymark.

On 24 June 1745, in the Artillery Ground, a "threes match" was played by William Hodsoll, Val Romney, and Richard Newland versus Robert Colchin, John Bryant, and one of the Harris brothers; Hodsoll's three won by 7 runs.

On 6 August 1746, a three-a-side game in the Artillery Ground involved "six players esteemed the best in England". The teams were Robert Colchin, John Bryant, and Joe Harris versus Stephen Dingate, Val Romney, and Richard Newland. Dingate's team won the match and it was said that "hundreds of pounds were lost and won over the game". Newspapers pre-announcing the event named John Harris in Colchin's team, but it was his brother Joe who actually played.

=== 1747–1750 ===
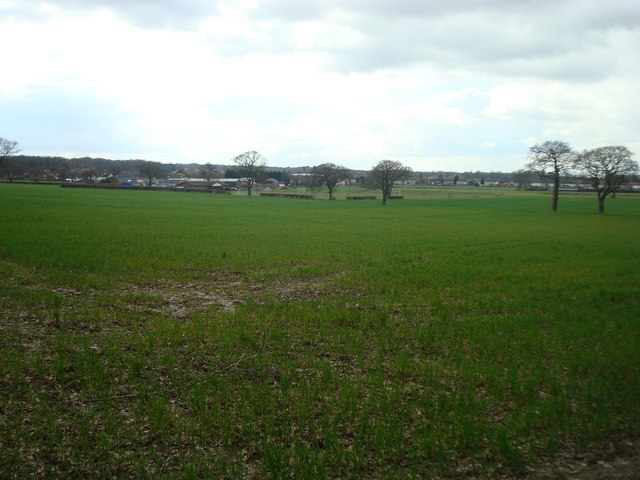
Bromley Common (pictured in 2009), used for cricket from the 1730s

Slindon were involved in four five-a-side matches at the Artillery Ground in July 1747. They played a match each against Dartford and Bromley, followed by two matches against Hadlow. Slindon had challenged "five of any parish in England, for their own Sum". It is known that the three Newland brothers were expected to play against Dartford, but no further details have been found. The Duke of Richmond organised two matches in early August 1747 and, in September, there was a three-a-side match between Long Robin's Three and Stephen Dingate's Three. It was ruled before the September match that "all Strokes behind as well as before Wickets" counted, (Note: The normal rule in a single wicket match was that a run could not be scored if the ball went past (and therefore "behind") the batsman's wicket, so the batsman could only score by hitting the ball forward of the wicket. Allowing "strokes behind" meant that runs could be scored wherever the ball had gone, as in regular cricket.) and in this respect the contest "differs from any Three Match ever play'd".

Records of eighteen matches have survived from the 1748 season, when the single wicket format reached its peak. Apart from one match on Addington Hill and another on Bromley Common, all of the known matches took place on the Artillery Ground. The format varied from one-a-side, as when Faulkner defeated Colchin in June on Bromley Common, to "twos", "threes", and "fives". On 6 June, Addington played a "fives" match against a team called "The Rest", the first time that this name was specifically used.

Records have survived of five matches in 1749, three of which were five-a-side between Addington and England; England won two, Addington one. There were also five matches in 1750, all five-a-side and three were between teams led by Tom Faulkner and Stephen Dingate. Faulkner's team won the first and third matches. The second match resulted in a tie in which both sides totalled nine. Joe Harris, playing for Faulkner's team, was the last man in and was caught while trying to hit the winning run.

== Club cricket ==
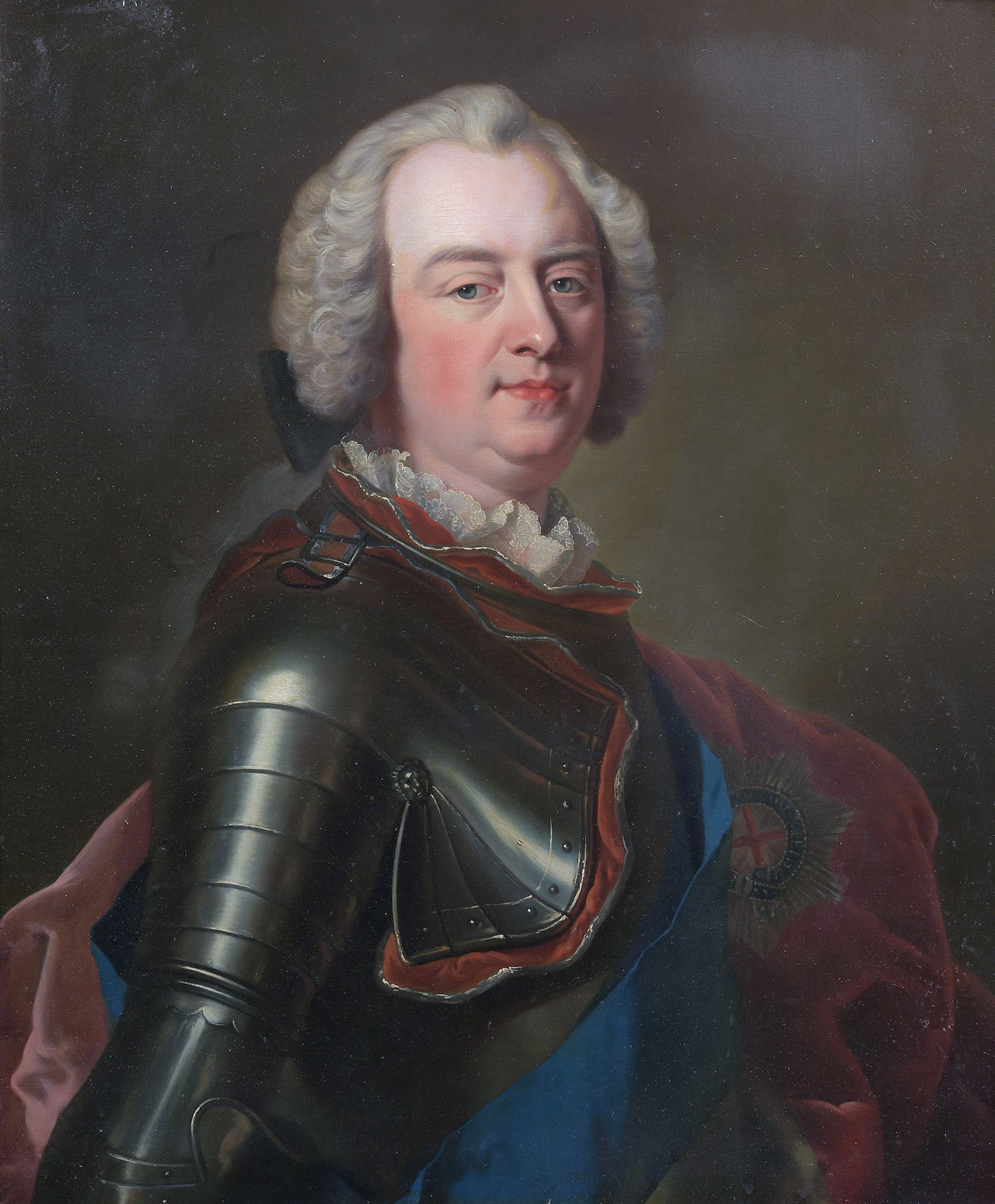
Charles Lennox, 2nd Duke of Richmond

While London Cricket Club presented an urban face of cricket, there were several famous rural clubs like Dartford, Chertsey, and Croydon, which could challenge London. Perhaps the most famous was Slindon, the Duke of Richmond's team, which is first recorded in a letter dated 30 July 1740 from Richmond to Thomas Pelham-Holles, 1st Duke of Newcastle, a future prime minister. Clubs of this calibre provided the main strength in their respective county teams which, in this period, were Kent, Middlesex, Surrey, and Sussex.

=== London ===
In terms of surviving records, London was easily the most prolific team of the period from 1726 to 1750. For example, the 1731 season has the highest number of known eleven-a-side matches (30) and sixteen of them involved London; no other team played in more than six. In 1743, there were 21 known eleven-a-side matches and nineteen involved London, while no other team played in more than three.

Matches between London and Dartford were first recorded in 1722, and this rivalry, albeit sporadic, continued into the 1750s. They met twice in 1729, with the first match in Dartford being played for a stake of £50, but the result is unknown. The return was on Kennington Common a few days later. The London Evening Post reported it as "a great cricket match on Kennington Common between the Londoners and the Dartford men for a considerable sum of money, wagers and bets, the latter beat the former very much". In 1731, they met five times between 5 June and 5 July—three times on the Artillery Ground and twice on Dartford Brent; London won the first match at home by 15 runs, the two in Dartford were drawn, and the other two results are unknown.

London were generally successful, especially in the 1730s, and had the strength to play against county teams. In 1734, they defeated Kent twice, in one match by an innings and 25 runs. In 1735, they played Surrey four times and won twice; one match was drawn and the other is an unknown result.

In the 1740s, London faced stronger opposition from clubs like Addington, Bromley, Slindon, and Woburn. In 1742, London met Bromley at the Artillery Ground on 14 June and the match ended in a tie, the second known instance of this result in eleven-a-side cricket. In 1743, they played Woburn five times with mixed success, winning three and losing two. On 25 July 1743, London were heavily beaten on the Artillery Ground by Addington, who had Robert Colchin as a given man. London batted first and were all out for 32. Addington scored 110 in reply and then dismissed London for 74 to win the match by an innings and 4 runs. The village of Addington is about three miles south-east of Croydon, and this was the club's first game in London. They fielded a strong eleven for a few years in the 1740s. London's most famous matches were probably the three against Slindon between 1742 and 1744. They won the first two in September 1742 but lost the 1744 match.

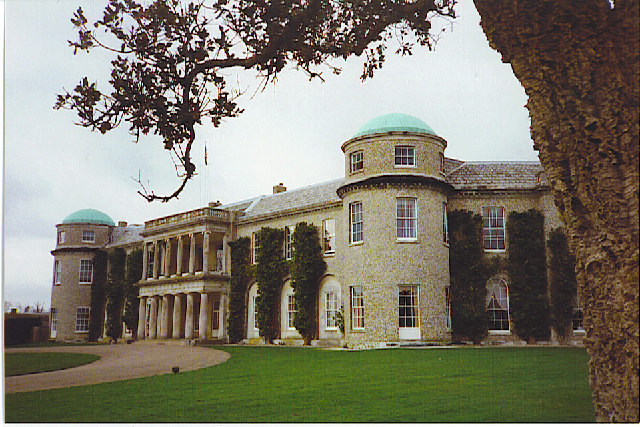
Goodwood House in Sussex, where the oldest known scorecard was kept.

On 2 June 1744, London played in the match that has left the earliest known scorecard. The card, which was kept by the Duke of Richmond at Goodwood House, contains individual scores but no details of dismissals. The match was played at the Artillery Ground between London and a combined Surrey and Sussex. Surrey & Sussex won by 55 runs after scoring 102 and 102 for 6, whilst London scored 79 and 70. The top scorer in the match was John Harris, playing for the combined XI, with 47 in the second innings. The card gives surnames only, although it does differentiate between the two pairs of brothers (the Harrises and Newlands) who were playing. As well as leaving the earliest scorecard, this was the first game at which tickets for readmission are known to have been issued to the spectators.

In 1745, London played four matches against Addington and three against Bromley. Few details are known other than five of the results. Addington defeated London at Addington Hills on 23 May, and then London won a return match at the Artillery Ground on the 27th. The results of the other two Addington matches are unknown. London's first match against Bromley was on 24 May, "behind the Bell Inn" on Bromley Common. Bromley won that match. There was a return on 10 June—postponed from 3 June because of rain—at the Artillery Ground, which London won by 10 runs after scoring 23 and 75; Bromley scored 52 and 36. There was then a "decider" on the 17th, also at the Artillery Ground for a prize of 200 guineas. Bromley scored 65 and 29; London scored 48 and then, as a contemporary newspaper reported it, "got the match and had only three hands out"—they must have scored 47 for 3 to win by 7 wickets.

=== Chertsey ===
Chertsey Cricket Club, famous in the second half of the century for the players Lumpy Stevens and William Yalden, was first recorded in 1736, when the team played five matches—three against Croydon, and two against London. Their matches against Croydon resulted in one win at their Laleham Burway home ground, one defeat at Croydon's Duppas Hill, and a draw in the third match on Richmond Green. In the last match, Chertsey scored 88 and 55; Croydon 58 and 25 for 9. Croydon, with one wicket standing, were 60 behind when the clock struck eight to end the match as a draw. Against London, Chertsey lost "by a very few notches" at Laleham Burway, and then won by 8 wickets on the Artillery Ground. In the second match, London scored 48 and 60; Chertsey replied with 97 & 12 for 2. Chertsey's team in the two London matches was unchanged from the one which played Croydon on Richmond Green, but none of the names were recorded.

=== Slindon ===
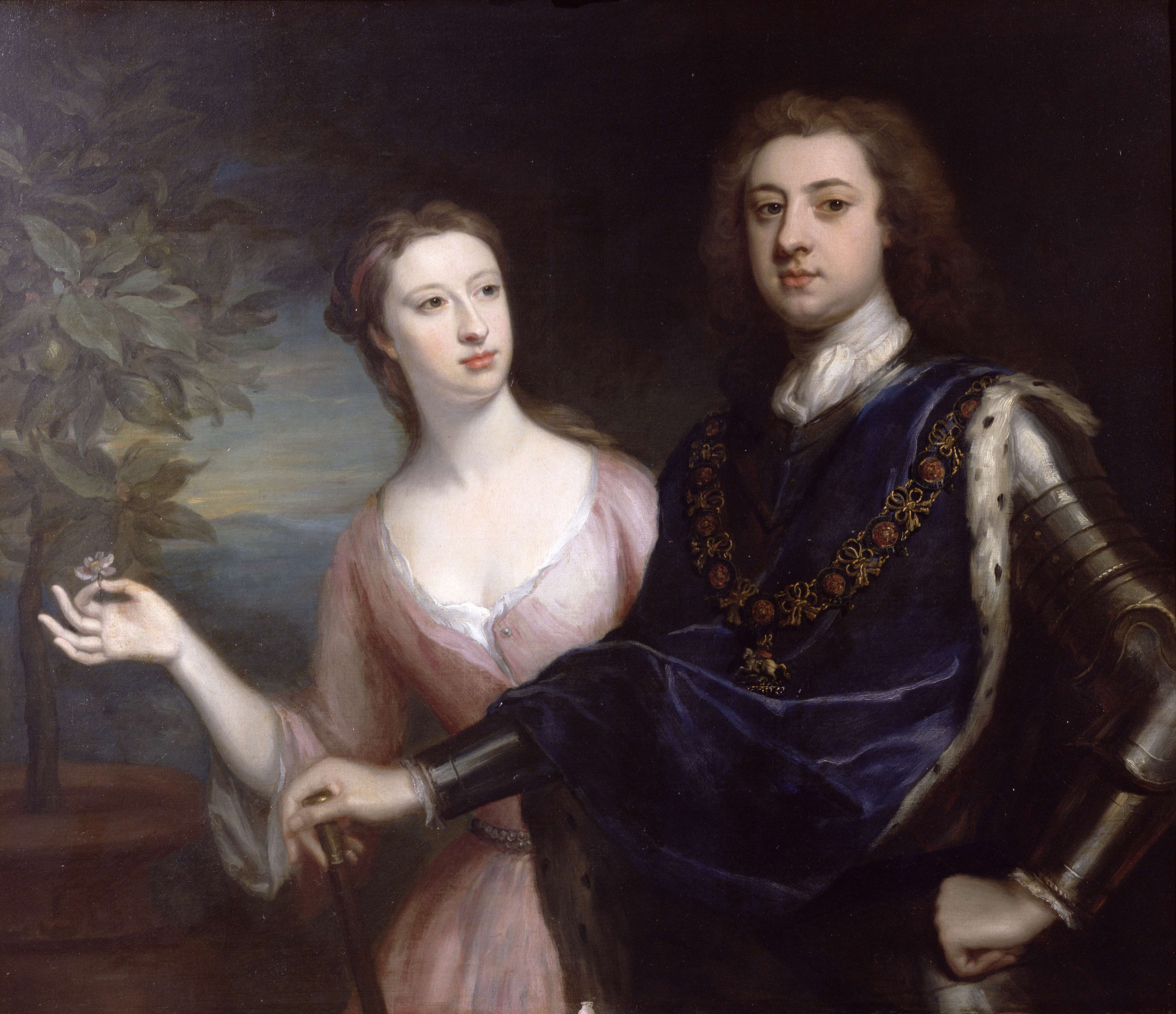
Charles Lennox, 2nd Duke of Richmond, and Duchess Sarah

The 1741 season saw the emergence of Slindon, whose team was recorded in four matches. Among the main primary sources for the events of the 1741 season are letters written by the 2nd Duke of Richmond and his wife, Duchess Sarah (1706–1751). She was formerly Lady Sarah Cadogan, daughter of William Cadogan, 1st Earl Cadogan. They married on 4 December 1719 at The Hague and had eight children, including Charles Lennox, 3rd Duke of Richmond. It seems that the marriage of Richmond to Duchess Sarah was a success, not always the case among the Georgian aristocracy. The Duchess took a keen interest in all the Duke's doings, including his cricket. Several references and letters written by her, including some financial accounts, have survived. For example, a letter to her husband on 9 July 1741 mentions a conversation with John Newland about a Slindon match against a team from East Dean at Long Down, near Eartham, a week earlier.

As documented in letters written by the Richmonds, Slindon are known to have played Portsmouth on 15 June 1741 at Stansted Park, near Chichester. That is the earliest-known match involving Slindon, though the club must have been playing for some time beforehand. Richmond said that "above 5,000 people" were present; in a second letter, he gave the result which was a win for Slindon by 9 wickets. Slindon played an unnamed team on 28 July, and Richmond said in a letter that it ended in a brawl.

Slindon's most famous match that season was against Surrey at Merrow Down, Guildford, on 7 September. Richmond, in a letter to his friend the Duke of Newcastle before the game, spoke of "poor little Slyndon (sic) against almost your whole county of Surrey". Next day he wrote again, saying that "wee (sic) have beat Surrey almost in one innings". The Duchess of Richmond wrote to her husband on 9 September, and said she "wish’d..... that the Sussex mobb (sic) had thrash'd the Surrey mob". She had "a grudge to those fellows ever since they mob'd you" (apparently, a reference to the Richmond Green fiasco in August 1731). She then said she wished the Duke "had won more of their moneys".

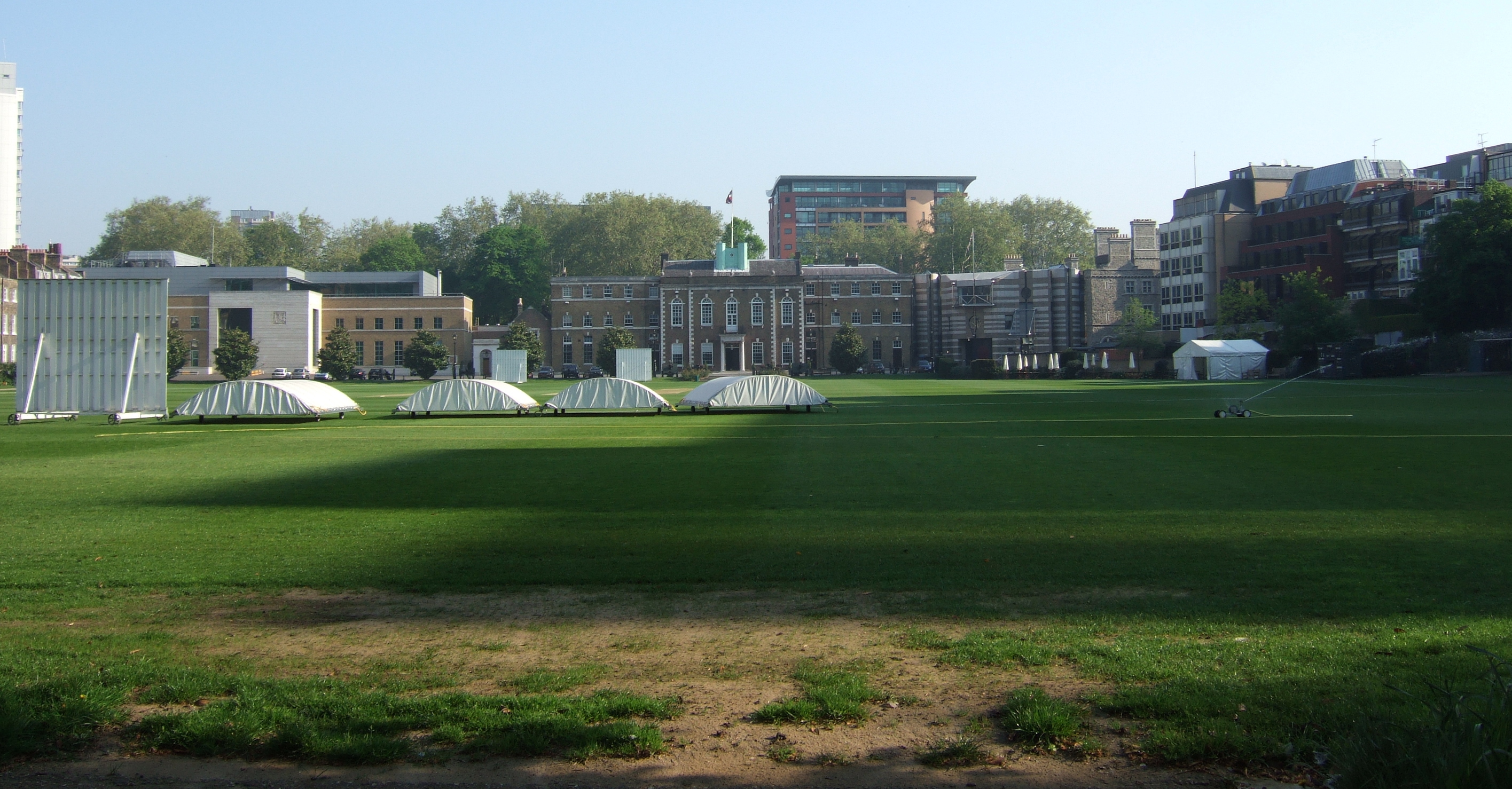
The Artillery Ground (pictured in 2008)

In September 1742, Slindon played London twice on the Artillery Ground and lost both times. A brief report in the London Evening Post says London won the first match "with much hard Play", and that Slindon came into the match "having played forty-three games and lost but one". The second match a few days later was a disaster for Slindon, who were beaten by "over 180 runs", a huge margin in 18th century conditions. Apparently, the match had been postponed because of rain. The Duke of Richmond challenged London to play Slindon at either Guildford or on the South Downs for £100, but London did not accept the challenge.

On Monday, 10 September 1744, London hosted Slindon again at the Artillery Ground. Play continued into the Tuesday and, after winning the match by an unknown margin, Slindon issued a challenge to play "any parish in England". They received immediate acceptances from Addington and Bromley. These matches were arranged to take place at the Artillery Ground over the next few days and it is known that Slindon versus Addington began on Wednesday, 12 September. It was impacted by bad weather, and Slindon led by two runs at close of play, with no surviving reports of play on the 13th. Slindon's match against Bromley was scheduled for Friday, 14 September, but there are no surviving reports of it taking place.

== County cricket ==
There was an increasing use of county names in the 1720s. Teams called Kent and Surrey had been recorded as far back as 1709, though they were probably not representative of the whole counties. In August 1726, a combined London and Surrey hosted Edwin Stead's Kent on Kennington Common, playing for a stake of 25 guineas. In 1728, Middlesex played London and then, in 1729, there was the first known use of Hampshire and Sussex in a team title, albeit not individually. In 1730, the first match took place between teams titled Surrey and Middlesex.

=== 1726–1730 ===
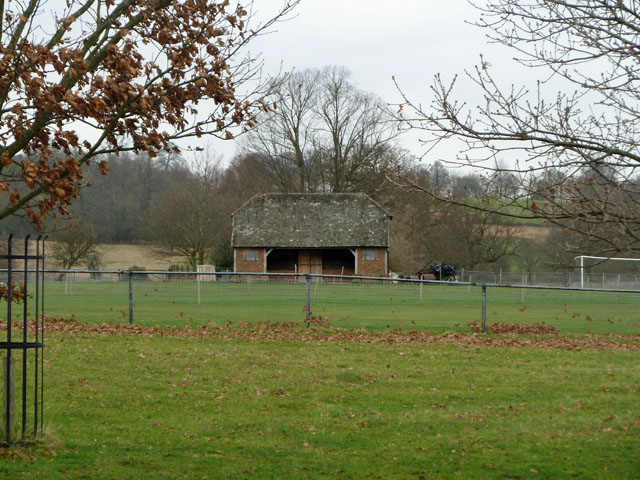
Penshurst Park cricket ground, with a pavilion which was a later addition (pictured in 2012).

In June 1728, the Swiss traveller César-François de Saussure noted in his journal the frequency with which he saw cricket being played while he was making his journeys across southern England. He referred to county matches as "a commonplace" and wrote that "everyone plays it, the common people and also men of rank". If they were a commonplace, they were also keenly contested to the point where winning teams would proclaim their county's superiority. In August of the same year, a game at Penshurst Park (near Tonbridge) between Kent and Sussex was won by Kent. The teams were organised by Edwin Stead (Kent) and Sir William Gage (Sussex). Edwin Stead's XI had earlier won two games against the 2nd Duke of Richmond's XI (also representing Sussex), and their victory over Sir William Gage's XI was reported as "the third time this summer that the Kent men have been too expert for those of Sussex".

In August 1729, there was a return match, again at Penshurst Park, between Stead's XI and Gage's XI – alternatively titled Kent (Stead's XI) versus Sussex, Surrey & Hampshire (Gage's XI). This was won by Gage's team, apparently by the earliest known innings victory. A match report singled out Thomas Waymark of Sussex for special praise, saying that he "turned the scale of victory, which for some years past has been generally on the Kentish side". It is from 1729 that sources tended to use county names instead of a patron's XI. A match on 24 June between Kent and Sussex is the first to feature a team that is expressly called Sussex, though the teams raised by Gage and Richmond in earlier seasons are understood to have been composed mainly, if not entirely, of Sussex players. On 26 August, the Daily Journal announced a Kent versus Surrey match as "Mr Steed (sic) of Kent and his Company, against the best Players in the County of Surrey".

In 1730, the St James Evening Post said of a match between Kent and London on 5 August that the "Kentish champions would have lost their honours by being beat at one innings if time had permitted", but the context is unclear and it may not mean that Kent were claiming to be the champion county. In any event, there was no county championship until well over a century later. Although unconfirmed, the match probably ended in a draw, time having run out. In all, there were ten matches involving county teams in 1730, but three were between Kent and London, plus three more between Surrey and London. In the four inter-county matches, Surrey played Middlesex three times and Sussex once. Middlesex against Surrey on 10 August, which Middlesex won, is the earliest known match on the Artillery Ground. According to a contemporary newspaper, the match between London and Surrey at Kennington Common on 17 August was "thought to be one of the completest matches that ever was played"; London won by a single run.

=== 1731–1740 ===
London continued to play against county opposition and, for many years, there were few inter-county matches. On 6 July 1732, the London team travelled to a location in Epping Forest to play against a combined Essex and Hertfordshire XI, with the result unknown. This is the earliest known reference to Essex in county cricket; it is the earliest recorded mention of cricket in connection with the county of Hertfordshire.

Having been probably the best county team for many years, Kent faced a strong challenge from Sussex in 1735. Sussex won at Lewes on 13 August and, according to a letter from John Whaley to Horace Walpole, were "as much pleased as if they had got an Election". Kent, however, won a return at Sevenoaks Vine a week or so later. The London Evening Post speculated that "the Conqueror" (i.e., a decider) between Kent and Sussex, led by Lord John Sackville and Sir William Gage respectively, would be played in a few days, but there is no record of it having taken place. Kent cricket suffered a huge blow on 28 August when its main patron Edwin Stead died. He was a compulsive gambler, and it seems he died in reduced circumstances.

Surrey were prominent in 1736, playing four matches against Middlesex, three against London, and two against Kent. They won four and lost three; one was drawn and the last is an unknown result. There was apparently some crowd trouble when Surrey played London on Barnes Common in August, as efforts were made to ring the field for the return at Lamb's Conduit Field a few days later. When Surrey met Kent on Kennington Common in September, there was some drama when three soldiers tried to apprehend a deserter. This interruption incensed the crowd who turned on the soldiers, rescued the deserter, and "after a severe discipline let them go about their business".

In 1737, Essex played London twice. The teams won one apiece, with London winning by 45 runs on the Artillery Ground in July, and Essex winning by 7 runs at an unknown venue in Ilford. This is the first mention of a team expressly called Essex, and the game at Ilford is the earliest that was definitely played in the county of Essex.

Kent had a strong team in 1737, twice defeating a combined London and Surrey team. The first match in June, on Kennington Common, was marred by serious crowd trouble. Kent, sponsored by Lord John Sackville, won by 40 runs after scoring 99 and 70 for 7 declared; London and Surrey, sponsored by the Prince of Wales, were dismissed for 31 and 98. One report says: "the Mob outrageously threw Dirt, Dung, etc. on Account of the people's entering within the Line". A week later, a man called John Smith died from complications of a wound caused when he was hit by one of the stones being thrown. Another report says that "the Press (i.e., crowd pressure) was so great" that a woman suffered a broken leg "by the Crowd bearing upon her". The Prince of Wales gave her ten guineas compensation. In the return on Bromley Common, Kent "maintained their honour, and beat their adversaries at one hands" (an innings victory). Despite the trouble, the fixture was repeated twice in 1738 – Kent won one and the other is an unknown result.

=== 1741–1750 ===
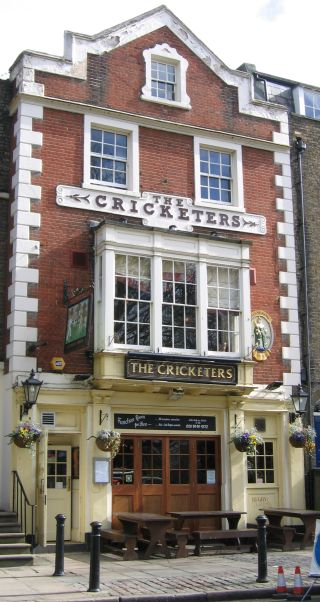
The Cricketers pub commemorates cricket on Richmond Green.

The earliest known tie in an eleven-a-side match occurred on 22 July 1741, when Surrey played London on Richmond Green. The scores were not recorded, but a contemporary report said the result was "a Tye (sic), which occasioned the Betts (sic) to be drawn on both Sides". Coincidentally, the same two teams had played in the September 1736 single wicket match which resulted in the earliest known tie in all forms of cricket.

There were few inter-county matches during this decade as the county teams tended to play London for the most part, and England teams were increasingly formed, but there were three Surrey versus Sussex matches in August 1745. The first of these took place at the Artillery Ground on Monday, 19 August, which was a significant date in British history as that Charles Edward Stuart ("Bonnie Prince Charlie") raised his standard at Glenfinnan to formally begin the '45 Rebellion. It is known that Richard Newland was playing for Sussex but Surrey won by " several notches", according to the St James Evening Post. The second match was played two days later on the 21st at Moulsey Hurst. The result is unknown but a flavour of the occasion is gained from a notice in that day's Daily Advertiser: "The Streatham Captain (George Williams), with his Flying Squadron of Red Caps, will attend at his grand Tent, to entertain Gentlemen with a cold Collation, the best French Wines, and other Liquours". It is possible that Sussex won this game because a third match, perhaps a decider, was arranged for 26 August at Bury Hill, Arundel, which was also called Berry Hill. The result is unknown but it would seem that Surrey might have won in view of a comment made by Lord John Sackville in a letter dated Saturday, 14 September to the 2nd Duke of Richmond, Sussex's patron: "I wish you had let Ridgeway play instead of your stopper behind it might have turned the match in our favour".

Kent played Surrey in 1746, but the result is unknown. There were no more inter-county matches for four years until the three Kent versus Surrey matches in 1750. Kent were handicapped by the loss of Robert Colchin, who had died of smallpox on 29 April 1750. The first match was on 6 July at Dartford Brent with a return on the 9th at the Artillery Ground. Kent won by 3 wickets on the Brent after Surrey had scored 57 and 36, and Kent had replied with 54 and 40 for 7. There is no surviving scorecard but the name of all 22 players are known: Hodsoll, Romney, the Bryant brothers, and the Bell brothers all played for Kent; Dingate, Faulkner, the Harris brothers, and John Frame all played for Surrey. The teams were unchanged for the return which Surrey won by 9 wickets after Kent had scored 53 and 55; Surrey replied with 80 and 29 for 1, to win with some ease. The third match, probably arranged as a decider, was at the Artillery Ground on 20 July. Surrey scored 55 and 42; Kent replied with 63 and 35 for 9 to win a very tight contest by 1 wicket; five runs had still been required when the penultimate wicket fell. The teams were unchanged from the two previous matches but again there are no individual scores. All three matches were won by the team batting second. The London Club ruled beforehand that players must reside in the county they play for. The Frames still lived at Warlingham in 1750, so John Frame could play for Surrey, but he was latterly associated with Dartford.

== England teams ==
Among seven known matches in 1739 are the first two to involve teams representing what may be called the Rest of England. Although these were by no means international teams, being composed of players from a handful of southern counties only, they were generally called England. The first match at Bromley Common on 9 July was billed as "eleven gentlemen of that county (Kent) and eleven gentlemen from any part of England, exclusive of Kent". The newspaper report described Kent as "the Unconquerable County" and said they won by "a very few notches". Two weeks later, the teams held a return match on the Artillery Ground before a crowd of over 10,000. This game was declared a draw after a furious dispute arose about whether one of the England players had been unfairly dismissed.

The next match featuring a team named England was in August 1742 on Moulsey Hurst; they were defeated by Surrey. However, the original notice of the match described Surrey's opponents as "London, Westminster, Middlesex, Southwark and Part of Kent".

England teams played six matches in May and June 1744, four against Kent and two against Surrey. They were not successful as they lost all four of the matches with a known result. On 18 June, England met Kent at the Artillery Ground in a celebrated match which left the second known scorecard and became the opening entry in Arthur Haygarth's Scores & Biographies, although he gave the year as 1746 instead of 1744. The scorecard is the first that includes dismissal information. England, batting first, totalled 40 and 70 in their two innings; Kent responded with 53 and 58 for 9 to win by one wicket. Details of the dismissals are only partially complete; it is known that Kent bowler William Hodsoll took at least eight wickets.

England played Kent twice in 1745, on Bromley Common and the Artillery Ground. Little is known about the first match on 12 July except that Kent won, and the stake was 1,000 guineas. The second match, played on 15 and 16 July, is remembered for a score of 88 by Richard Newland. England won the match, also played for a stake of 1,000 guineas, by 119 runs. Newland's 88 is the highest individual innings on record until at least 1768 when John Small scored "above seven score notches"—however, it is not known if Small achieved that in one innings or if it was his match total. The earliest known definite century was 107 by John Minshull in August 1769, but the match was a minor one only, with the first century definitely scored in an important match being by Small for Hampshire against Surrey in July 1775.

Although neither team was called England, there were two other big matches in 1745 which involved players from a wide spread of counties. The teams being led by the game's top two players, the matches were billed Long Robin's XI versus Richard Newland's XI. Both were played at the Artillery Ground in June and won convincingly by Colchin's team, the first by "over 70 runs", and the second by 5 wickets. Besides Colchin and Newland, leading players who took part included William Hodsoll; Val Romney; Tom Faulkner; John Bowra; Robert Lascoe; George Jackson; William Anderson; Little and Tall Bennett; James and John Bryant; and Joe and John Harris. Kent met England again in 1746, two matches being played on 2 and 4 August at Bromley Common and the Artillery Ground. The result of the first is unknown, but England won the second.

The Parliamentary Election of 1747 caused some disruption to cricket matches scheduled for the end of June and early July. Kent were again due to meet England at Bromley Common and the Artillery Ground but, as the source reported it, matches "are deferred on account of the gentlemen subscribers being engaged at several Elections". The Parliamentary Election resulted in a Whig government under Henry Pelham. It is not known if the Bromley Common match was eventually played, but England did meet Kent on 31 August at the Artillery Ground. Before the match took place, George Smith, the groundsman of the Artillery Ground, announced: "The Town may be certain that the taking Six-pence Admittance is out of no avaricious Temper. Two-pence being greatly insufficient to the Charge that attends the Matches, which Mr Smith is ready and willing to make appear to any Gentleman". The advertised teams in the Daily Advertiser on 31 August were:

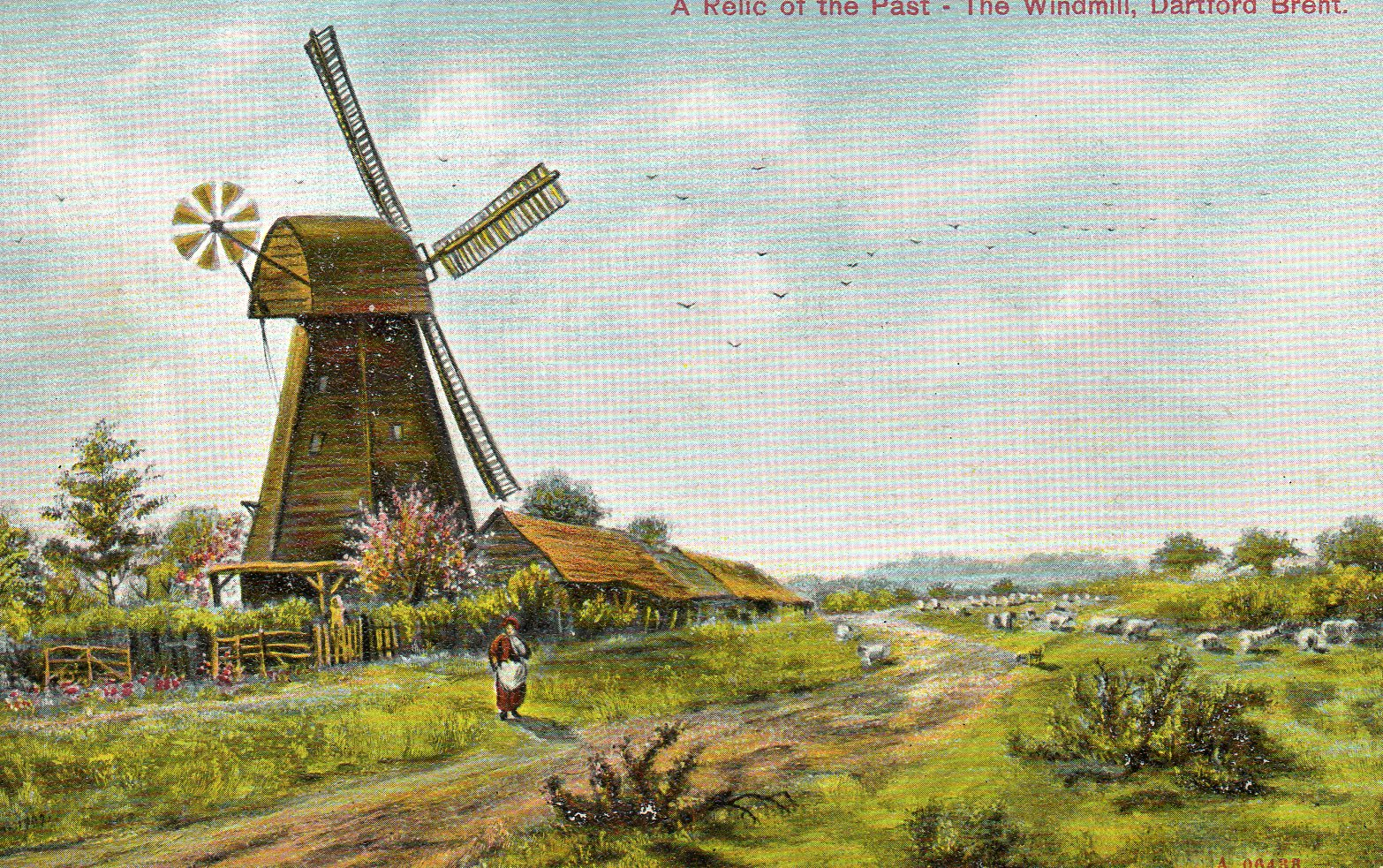
Dartford Brent. The windmill was demolished in 1901.

- Kent – Robert Colchin, James Bryant, John Bryant, Val Romney, Robert Eures, John Larkin, George Kipps (wicket-keeper), John Mansfield, John Bell, Thomas Bell, Jones.
- England – Richard Newland, William Sawyer, Tom Faulkner, Stephen Dingate, Little Bennett, Thomas Jure, Joe Harris, Broad, George Jackson, Green, Maynard.

England played Kent twice in 1748, but lost both times. Both matches were in June at Dartford Brent and the Artillery Ground. Kent won by 11 runs on the Brent and a newspaper report said: "It was esteemed all of a curious match, the odds being two to one on each side playing". Nothing is known of the second match except that Kent won it. England played Surrey twice in June 1749. The first match was on Dartford Brent and Surrey won by 2 wickets. England scored 89 and 42; Surrey replied with 73 and 59 for 8. No individual performances are known. England had William Durling of Addington, which is in Surrey, as a given man; Surrey had James and John Bryant (of Bromley) as given men. In the second match on the Artillery Ground, the result was a draw after England scored 71 and 47. Surrey scored 89 in their first innings but bad light prevented them chasing their target of 30. Presumably the match had to be finished (or left unfinished) on the one day. A report said the two teams were unchanged from the previous match.

== Venues ==
Well-known venues of the time included Dartford Brent, Kennington Common, Laleham Burway, Moulsey Hurst, Richmond Green, and Sevenoaks Vine. The most famous, as the sport's focal point through the mid-18th century, was the Artillery Ground in Bunhill Fields, Finsbury, London. Around 1730, this became the preferred home venue of London Cricket Club, and the stage for numerous important matches, including lucrative single wicket contests.

Some matches in the 1720s were arranged at places like Peper Harow and Penshurst Park which have long been horse racing locations (today, both house point-to-point racecourses), while Moulsey Hurst was perhaps better known as a prizefighting venue; there were strong gambling connections between cricket, racing, and prizefighting throughout the 18th century.

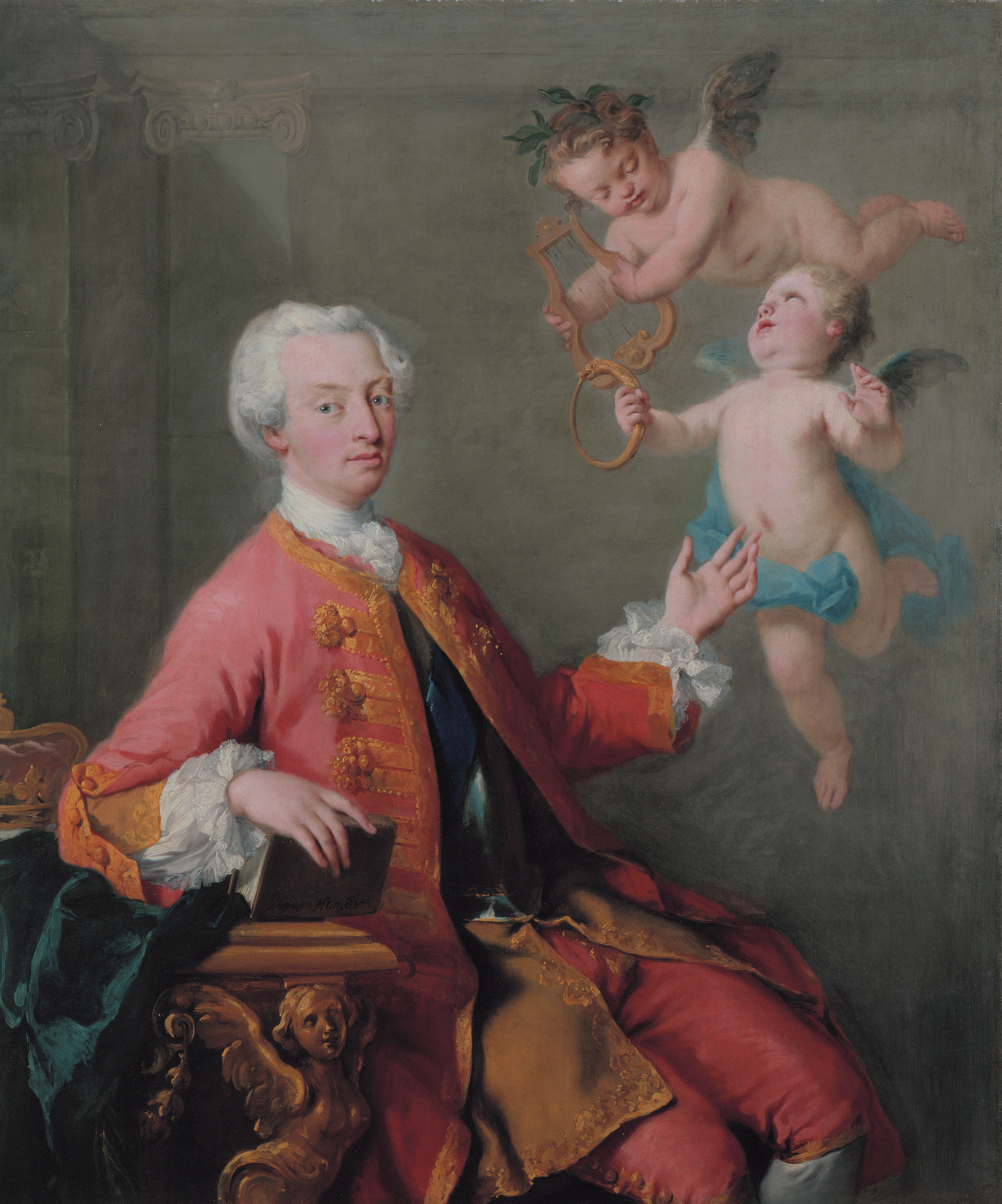
Frederick, Prince of Wales (painted in 1736 by Jacopo Amigoni)

A London versus Surrey match on 31 August 1730 took place at the Artillery Ground, which London won by 6 runs. It is the earliest definite match at the venue, referenced in contemporary reports as the "old" Artillery Ground, although that may have been because of frequent use for other forms of sport or entertainment. It was generally used for matches involving the original London Club and also became the feature venue of all London cricket until the mid-1760s. In 1748, George Smith, groundskeeper of the Artillery Ground, and landlord of the adjoining Pyed Horse in Chiswell Street, declared bankruptcy. A number of notices appeared in the press during the first six months of 1748, but Smith eventually resolved his problems, perhaps through the sale of other property, and was able to retain control of the Artillery Ground until 1752.

The earliest known instances of ground enclosure occurred in 1731, the playing area on Kennington Common being roped off twice in an attempt to keep spectators off the field. Cricket is the first sport known to have enclosed its venues and it quickly became common practice with stakes and ropes being reported at the Artillery Ground in 1732. It is not clear when admission fees were introduced but there was certainly a two pence charge in place at the Artillery Ground by the early 1740s, and this was increased to sixpence for certain matches.

Sevenoaks Vine, the colloquial name of the Vine Cricket Ground in Sevenoaks, was first recorded as a venue in September 1734, when Kent defeated Sussex. Lord Middlesex and his brother Lord John Sackville played for Kent; and Sir William Gage for Sussex. Kent won the match.

Laleham Burway was first recorded as the venue for two Chertsey matches in 1736. It does not appear in the sources again until 1759, from when it became one of the most frequent venues for big matches. It famously staged the 1771 Chertsey versus Hambledon match in which Thomas "Daddy" White used a bat that was the width of the wicket—as a result, the maximum width of the bat was set at four and one quarter inches.

Kew Green was an occasional venue in the 1730s and was favoured by the Prince of Wales. In 1737, he arranged three matches there in which the Prince of Wales' XI met Sir William Gage's XI, the 3rd Duke of Marlborough's XI, and London. The result of the Gage match is unknown, and Wales' XI defeated Marlborough's XI. G. B. Buckley doubts if the London match was played as Wales' first child Princess Augusta was born to "great rejoicings in London". The Prince provided beer for the populace but "one lot of it was too bad to drink". Augusta was the elder sister of George III and the mother of Princess Caroline of Brunswick.

== Emergence of written rules ==
=== Articles of Agreement, 1727 ===
In 1727, the 2nd Duke of Richmond organised two matches between his own team and Alan Brodrick's XI. Richmond and Brodrick drew up Articles of Agreement between them to determine the rules that must apply in these contests. This type of agreement seems to have been used throughout the period. It is the earliest known instance of rules (or some part of the rules as in this case) being formally agreed, although rules as such definitely existed. In early times, the rules would be agreed orally and subject to local variations so the Articles of Agreement were created to complement and clarify the rules.

Another reference to Articles of Agreement occurs in 1730 when London played Kent at a venue called Frog Lane in Islington. The report says: "but being obliged by their Articles to leave off at seven o'clock", they could not finish it. London had a lead of 30 when play ended and there was a resumption on Kennington Common six days later.

A game between London and Sevenoaks was arranged for 8 July 1734 on Kennington Common, but it was not played due to the non-appearance of the Sevenoaks team. The Whitehall Evening Post reported that, according to the Articles of Agreement, their deposit money was forfeit.

=== General practice and codification ===
The first formalised Laws of Cricket were written in 1744. Referring to the 1774 version of the Laws, writer and former politician John Major says regulation had hitherto been "rather informal". He believes that the 1744 rules were only a revision or codification of existing practice.

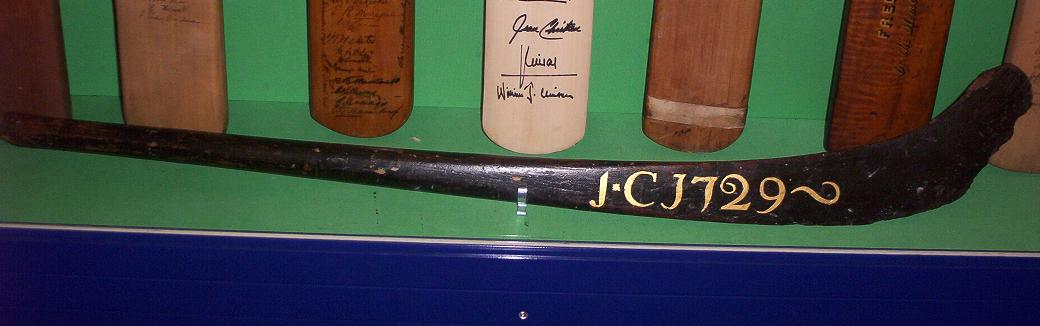
The oldest cricket bat still in existence dates from 1729. The shape is more like that of a modern-day hockey stick than a modern-day cricket bat. It is kept in the Sandham Room in the Member's Pavilion at The Oval.

The 1727 Articles of Agreement stated that "the Duke of Richmond & Mr. Brodrick shall determine the Ball or Balls to be played with". Similar rules applied through the period and there was no known attempt to standardise bat or ball size until much later. Batsmen defended a two-stump wicket using a bat shaped like a modern hockey stick against a ball that was bowled all along the ground, either by rolling or skimming. The oldest known surviving cricket bat is dated 1729. It is on display in The Oval pavilion and belonged to one John Chitty of Knaphill, Surrey.

Pads, gloves, and other forms of protective equipment were unknown. Umpires carried a stick, believed to be a bat, which the batsmen had to touch to complete a run. Scorers sat on a mound in the field and "notched" runs (then known as notches) on tally sticks. All runs had to be completed in full as boundaries were not recognised and there were no known rules concerning the care and maintenance of the wicket, although the leading bowler on the visiting team had the right to decide where the wickets would be pitched.

The only early rule about pitch and wicket dimensions was re the length of the pitch at 23 yards in 1727; this had become a chain (22 yards) by 1744. Major says the dimensions of the wicket, two stumps topped by a single bail, were set at 22 inches high and six inches wide.

The 1744 code stipulated that the bowling and popping creases must be cut with the popping crease exactly three feet ten inches before the bowling crease; and that the no ball is the penalty for overstepping, which then meant the hind foot going in front of the bowling crease. The Laws for bowlers did not say he must roll the ball and there was no mention of prescribed arm action, only that he must "deliver the ball" with one foot behind the bowling crease. The cricket historian Rowland Bowen, writing in the 1965 edition of Wisden Cricketers' Almanack, asserted that the ball was bowled in the true sense (all along the ground) through the first half of the 18th century, and that this was the rule prior to the 1750s, though it was largely forsaken by the 1770s after bowlers began pitching the ball.

== Controversy ==
=== Legal cases ===
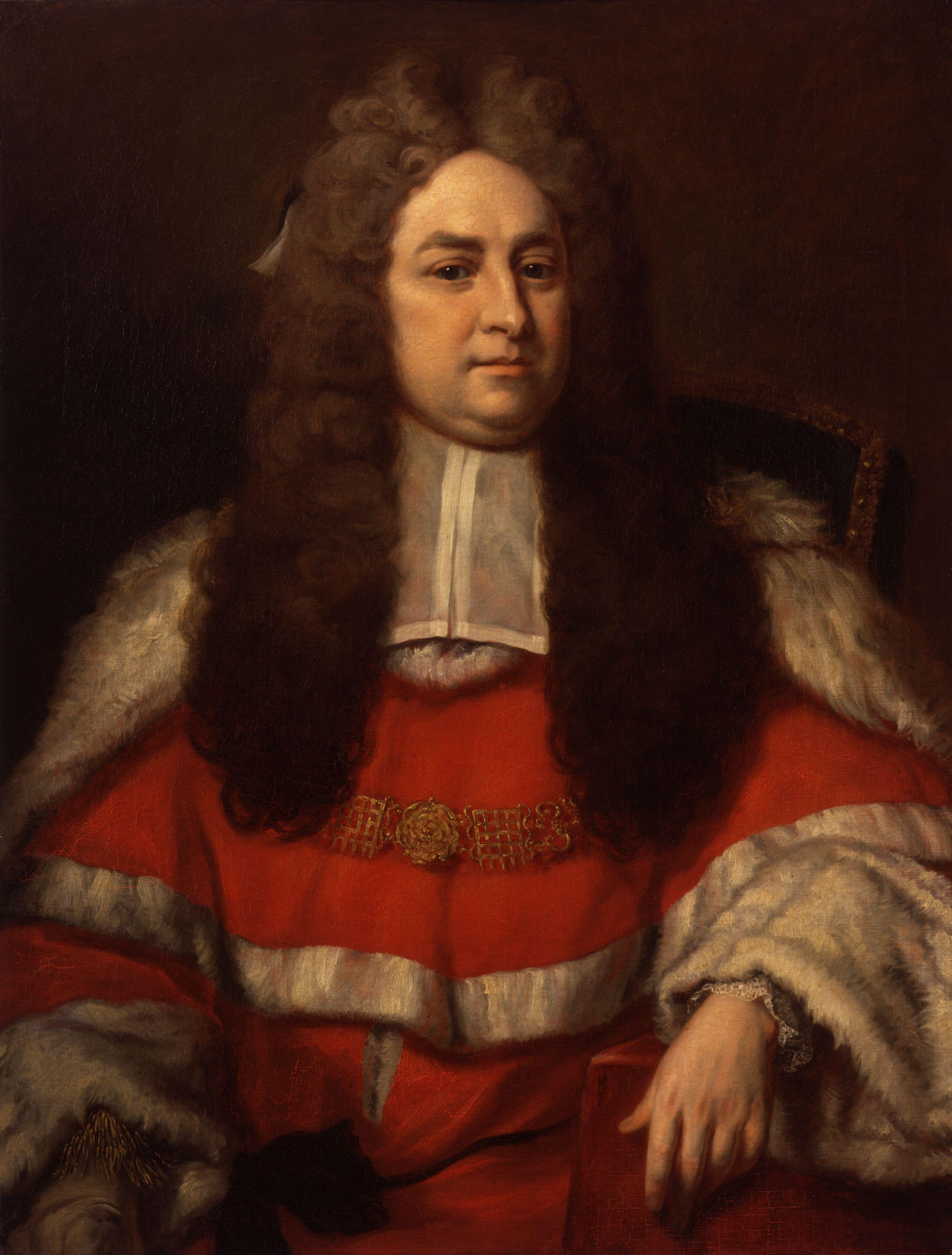
Lord Chief Justice Pratt (painted by Michael Dahl)

Cricket had some legal issues in the first half of the century, including two court cases about unpaid gambling debts. The second of these followed a match in 1724, between Stead's XI and a Chingford team on Dartford Brent. Terminating Stead's lawsuit, Lord Chief Justice Pratt ordered the match to be completed in order that the stakes could be settled. The replay took place in September 1726. In a letter written the same month, an Essex resident complained that a local Justice of the Peace had literally "read the Riot Act" to some people who were playing cricket. With reference to Pratt's ruling, the issue raised was that it was apparently lawful to play cricket in Kent but not in Essex.

=== Gambling ===
Gambling was prevalent at cricket matches in Georgian England and many gambling- or alcohol-fuelled incidents occurred. The issue was not addressed by the sport's ruling body until the 1770s, and it remained a significant problem through the 1730s and 1740s. The other side of the coin was the importance to cricket, as a professional sport, of investment accrued through gambling interests – that was illustrated in 1730 when a match between teams sponsored by Richmond and Gage was cancelled "on account of Waymark, the Duke's man, being ill". As Waymark was an outstanding player, stakes would have been laid on his expected performance and his absence meant all bets were off.

=== Matches ===
A controversial match took place on Monday, 23 August 1731, when Thomas Chambers' XI met the 2nd Duke of Richmond's XI (i.e., effectively a Middlesex v. Sussex match) in a return match at Richmond Green, played for 200 guineas. It is notable in one sense as the earliest match of which the team scores are known: Richmond's XI 79, Chambers' XI 119; Richmond's XI 72, Chambers' XI 23 for 5 (approximately). The game ended promptly at a pre-agreed time, although Chambers' XI with "four or five more to have come in" and needing "about 8 to 10 notches" clearly had the upper hand. The result caused a fracas among the crowd who were incensed by the prompt finish because the Duke of Richmond had arrived late and delayed the start of the game. The riot resulted in some of the Sussex players "having the shirts torn off their backs; and it was said a law suit would commence about the play". On Wednesday, 8 September, the Daily Post Boy reported that "(on 6 September) 11 of Surrey beat the 11 who about a fortnight ago beat the Duke of Richmond's men". This would suggest that the Duke of Richmond conceded his controversial game against Chambers' XI.

A dispute arose over scheduled finishing time in the London versus Middlesex match at the Artillery Ground on 13 September 1732. London, batting last, needed seven more runs to win with six wickets standing when a Middlesex player tried to terminate the game as a draw by claiming time was up. According to the scorer's watch, there were still several minutes to go. The newspaper report said that the London players intended legal action as over £100 was at stake.

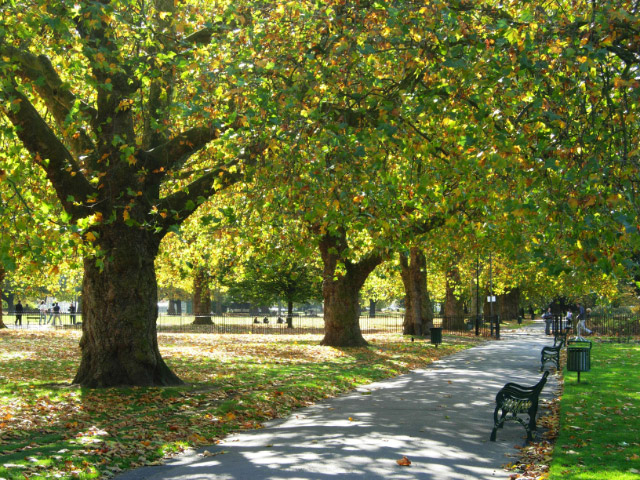
Part of Kennington Common that is now within Kennington Park

In September 1734, London issued a challenge "to play with any eleven men in England, with this exception only, that they will not admit of one from Croydon". There was a dispute between the London and Croydon clubs after the latter failed to appear for an arranged match. London were especially aggrieved that Croydon did this after "having been regaled with a good dinner". It is not known if the challenge match was played.

In May 1737, there was a tragic incident in a local match at Newick in Sussex, when a player called John Boots was killed after he collided with his partner whilst going for a run. Both men were knocked down but got up again, only for Mr Boots to drop down dead as he was running to his wicket. This was recorded in a number of sources, including one reference in the West Sussex Records Office which named Mr Boots and said he was buried on Tuesday, 31 May at Chailey. Chailey and Newick are neighbouring parishes just to the north of Lewes in East Sussex. In the following month, there was crowd trouble at a match on Kennington Common between Kent and the combined London/Surrey team. Missiles were thrown and a man died a week later after being struck by a stone.

In 1739, the return match between Kent and England was played on the Artillery Ground before a crowd of over 10,000. This game was declared a draw after a furious dispute arose about whether one of the England players had been unfairly dismissed.

In a letter to his friend the Duke of Newcastle, the Duke of Richmond spoke about a game on 28 July 1741 which resulted in a brawl with "hearty blows" and "broken heads". The game was at Portslade between Slindon and unnamed opponents.

There was crowd disorder at the England versus Kent match on Monday, 18 June 1744. The Daily Advertiser reported on Saturday, 30 June that it was "with difficulty the match was played out". A decision was taken to charge sixpence admission at future matches on the Artillery Ground. Also, the field would be surrounded by a ring of benches to hold over 800 people and no one without prior authorisation would be allowed within the ring.

== See also ==
- History of cricket to 1725
- History of English cricket (1751–1775)

== Bibliography ==
- ACS (1981). A Guide to Important Cricket Matches Played in the British Isles 1709–1863. Nottingham: ACS. OCLC 85045528.
- Altham, H. S.; Swanton, E. W. (1962). A History of Cricket, Volume 1 (to 1914) (5th ed.). London: George Allen & Unwin. OCLC 894274808.
- Birley, Derek (1999). A Social History of English Cricket. London: Aurum Press. ISBN 978-18-54107-10-7 – via Internet Archive.
- Bowen, Rowland (1970). Cricket: A History of its Growth and Development. London: Eyre & Spottiswoode. ISBN 978-04-13278-60-9.
- Buckley, G. B. (1935). Fresh Light on 18th Century Cricket. Birmingham: Cotterell & Co. OCLC 23450280.
- Buckley, G. B. (1937). Fresh Light on pre-Victorian Cricket. Birmingham: Cotterell & Co. OCLC 23469107.
- Byrd, William (1941). The Secret Diary of William Byrd of Westover, 1709–1712. Richmond, Virginia: Dietz Publishing. OCLC 1364677 – via Internet Archive.
- Haygarth, Arthur (1996) [1862]. Scores & Biographies, Volume 1 (1744–1826). Kennington: Frederick Lillywhite. ISBN 978-19-00592-23-9.
- Major, John (2007). More Than A Game. London: HarperCollins. ISBN 978-00-07183-64-7 – via Internet Archive.
- Malcolm, Dominic (2013). Globalizing Cricket. London: Bloomsbury Publishing. ISBN 978-18-49665-27-8.
- Marshall, John (1961). The Duke Who Was Cricket. London: Frederick Muller Ltd. OCLC 11214571.
- Maun, Ian (2009). From Commons to Lord's, Volume One: 1700 to 1750. Cambridge: Roger Heavens. ISBN 978-19-00592-52-9.
- McCann, Tim (2004). Sussex Cricket in the Eighteenth Century (PDF). Vol. 88. Lewes: West Sussex Record Office. ISBN 978-08-54450-55-8.
- Nyren, John (1998) [1832]. Mote, Ashley (ed.). The Cricketers of my Time. London: Robson Publishing. ISBN 978-18-61051-68-4.
- Underdown, David (2000). Start of Play. Westminster: Allen Lane. ISBN 978-07-13993-30-1 – via Internet Archive.
- Waghorn, H. T. (1899). Cricket Scores, Notes, &c. From 1730–1773. Edinburgh: Blackwood. OCLC 1086375331.
- Waghorn, H. T. (2005) [1906]. The Dawn of Cricket. London: J. W. McKenzie. ISBN 978-09-47821-17-3.
- Webber, Roy (1960). The Phoenix History of Cricket. Charing Cross, London: Phoenix House Ltd. OCLC 5391059.
