= 1743 English cricket season =

Cricket season review

Several outstanding players were first named by sources in the 1743 English cricket season. The increasing popularity of single wicket is evident in a three-a-side match which was publicised as a contest between the "best six players in England", and reportedly drew a crowd of over 10,000 into the Artillery Ground. Other events included a revolutionary new ball design. Details of 24 historically important matches are known. (Note: Any match listed in the ACS' Important Match Guide (1981) is historically important, and therefore of the highest standard, whether or not a scorecard might exist. The same applies to numerous matches discovered by researchers since 1981. For further information, see First-class cricket.)

== Three of Kent v Three of England ==
This was a three-a-side single wicket game, played 11 July at the Artillery Ground. The six players involved were publicised as "the best in England". They were William Hodsoll (Dartford), John Cutbush (Maidstone), and Val Romney (Sevenoaks) playing as Three of Kent; and Richard Newland (Slindon), William Sawyer (Richmond) and John Bryant (Bromley) playing as Three of England. Hodsoll and Newland were the captains.

The Daily Advertiser of Thursday, 7 July says Thomas Ridgeway of Sussex was to play alongside Hodsoll and Romney. Then, on Friday, 8 July, Cutbush, known to have been a clockmaker from Maidstone, was named instead of Ridgeway. Kent won by 2 runs. The London Evening Post says the crowd was "computed" to be over 10,000. A return match was arranged at Sevenoaks Vine on Wednesday, 27 July, but it did not come off.

Two more single wicket events were arranged in August between Five of London and Five of Richmond. The venues were Richmond Green and the Artillery Ground. Neither result is known.

== Kent v London, Middlesex & Surrey ==
On 16 May, Kent played against a combined London, Middlesex & Surrey team (LMS) on Bromley Common. LMS batted first and scored 97. Kent in reply made 69. In their second innings, LMS had made 112/3 when time was up at eight o'clock (20:00). The match situation was that LMS led by 140 runs with seven wickets in hand. It was initially agreed to continue next day, but Kent later "gave up the match". The LMS team was also described as Lord Montfort's XI. Montfort was associated with the London club, and seems to have been a noted patron of the game, although this match is the only one with which he can be directly associated. Kent were organised by Lord John Philip Sackville.

== London v Addington ==
On Monday, 25 July, London met Addington on the Artillery Ground. Addington is about 3 miles south-east of Croydon and this was the club's first game in London. They had a very strong eleven for some years at this time and the club immediately accepted the Slindon challenge, in 1744, to play against "any parish in England". Robert Colchin of Bromley and Tom Peake of Chelsfield played for Addington as given men. William Sawyer of Richmond played for London as a given man. Tom Peake, who died in 1767, lived at Chelsfield and Orpington. London batting first made 32 and 74. Addington in their only innings scored 110 and so won by an innings and 4 runs.

== London v Woburn ==
London played five matches against Woburn whose team, based at Woburn Park, was organised by the 4th Duke of Bedford. The first two fixtures were on 27 and 28 May at Woburn Park. The teams won one apiece, but by unknown margins. The next game on 13 June, played at the Artillery Ground, may have been intended as a decider. Woburn won by 54 runs.

The other two matches were on 1 August at Woburn Park, and on 8 August at the Artillery Ground. Innings totals of both games have been recorded. In the first, London scored 46 and 60; Woburn 72 and 31. London won by 3 runs. In the second, Woburn scored 104 and 36; London 93 and 48/9. London won by 1 wicket.

== London v Horsmonden ==
A report in the Kentish Weekly Post on 9 July said that Horsmonden Cricket Club, playing at home, had defeated a team from the combined villages of Romney, Cranbrook, and Staplehurst with a return due to take place on 11 July.

In September, Horsmonden played three matches against London. In these, they were called Horsmonden & Weald. The first match was on 5&6 September at the Artillery Ground. London won by 1 wicket, and three runs were still required when the last man went in. They played again on 12 September, also at the Artillery Ground, and London won by an unknown margin.

There was to be a third match later in the month, but neither the venue nor the result are known.

== London v Sevenoaks ==
There were three matches between London and the Sevenoaks Cricket Club. The first was played 23 and 24 August on Sevenoaks Vine. London scored 41 and 54; Sevenoaks 49 and 40. Sevenoaks were 24/6 in their second innings at close of play on the 23rd, still needing 23 to win. London won 6 runs. There was a return match, played 29 August, on the Artillery Ground. The pre-match announcement said: "the match played on Sevenoaks Vine, being won with great difficulty by London, has caused several considerable bets to be laid, between the noblemen and gentlemen then present; 'tis desired all persons will keep the utmost extent of the line". London won again, but by an unknown margin.

A third match was to be played 14 September on the Artillery Ground. It was pre-announced as "the third great match of cricket" between the two. However, the result is unknown.

== Dartford v Rochester ==
On 13 June, Dartford played the Rochester Cricket Club at Dartford Brent. Dartford won by 30 runs. This is the first mention of the Rochester club, which is unlikely to have had a connection with the old Rochester Punch Club. A return match was played 23 June on Marsh's New Ground in Rochester. The result is unknown.

== Combined teams ==
Six matches took place in which London faced a combined eleven. The teams were Deptford & Greenwich (D&G), Bromley & Chislehurst (B&C), Kingston & Richmond (K&R), and Berkshire, Buckinghamshire & Middlesex (BBM).

London played the D&G team at Blackheath on 9 June. D&G won by an unknown margin.

There were two matches between London and the B&C team. The first was played 24 June on Bromley Common, where B&C won "with difficulty". The return match was played three days later on the Artillery Ground. The result is unknown.

London also played the K&R team twice. These matches were played 4 July on Richmond Green, and 18 July on the Artillery Ground. In the first match, the famous Robert Colchin ("Long Robin") of Bromley Cricket Club played for London as a given man. This is the earliest known mention of Colchin. London won by an unknown margin. In the return match, Colchin again played for London as a given man. Scores are known: London 57 and 117; K&R 55 and 52, so London won by 67 runs.

London and the BBM team played 19 September on the Artillery Ground. It was announced beforehand that: "the days being short, it is ordered that the wickets be pitched at 10 o’clock. This will be the last great match of the season". London won by 53 runs.

== Suffolk ==
On Monday, 5 September, there was a match at Finningham between teams from Finningham and Stradbroke which is the earliest known reference to cricket in the county of Suffolk. Stradbroke, who had some given men from Stowmarket, won the match.

== Ball design ==
The heavy modern-type ball with wound core and a thick leather cover may have come into use about this time. Ashley-Cooper recorded that a Mr Clout was active in Sevenoaks as "the first cricket ball maker of any pretension". The better-known equipment manufacturing firm of Dukes was founded 1760 in Penshurst.

== Cricket and art ==
The well known painting The Cricket Match by Francis Hayman dates from this year. It now hangs at Lord's. It depicts a game 'as played at the Artillery Ground', and shows a tall two stump wicket. The batsman has a bat that is distinctly hockey-shaped; the ball has been trundled but appears to be 'off the ground', so it was perhaps a quicker skimmed delivery; and in the foreground is a scorer notching the tally.

From the same year comes An Exact Representation of the Game of Cricket by Louis Philippe Boitard. This now hangs in the Tate Gallery.

== Other events ==
On Tuesday, 26 April, the Daily Advertiser reported that a British Army deserter called Stephen Rose, from Chertsey and aged 21, was "a famous Cricket-Player".

On 6 June, a game between teams from Shacklewell and Westminster was played at The Cock in Shacklewell, near Stoke Newington. This is evidence of the involvement of the brewing industry in the sport; a number of grounds, ranging from Broadhalfpenny Down to Trent Bridge, were established on fields adjacent to inns and taverns.

There was a game played 16 June on Walworth Common in which a team from Bermondsey defeated one from Deptford & the King's Yard by an innings and 27 runs. It was clearly a minor fixture, but F. S. Ashley-Cooper helpfully explained that Walworth Common was situated where Westmoreland Road, Faraday Street, and Mann Street stood in 1900. He said the ground was "about three-quarters of a mile from where the Bee Hive Ground afterwards existed". The Bee Hive was Montpelier Cricket Club's home ground.

There was a match between teams called "Lewes Rape" and "Pevensey Rape" on 3 August. The venue was given as Lewes Down, near the "Horse-Course". Although it was a village match between two Sussex parishes, the stake was "a considerable sum of money". The Lewes Down venue was probably where Sir William Gage's XI met Edwin Stead's XI in September 1729.

== First mentions ==
=== Counties ===
- Suffolk

=== Clubs and teams ===
- Addington
- Berkshire, Buckinghamshire & Middlesex
- Bromley & Chislehurst
- Deptford & Greenwich
- Kingston & Richmond
- London, Middlesex & Surrey
- Maidstone
- Rochester
- Woburn

=== Venues ===
- Marsh's New Ground, in Rochester

=== Players ===
name	club/county	notes
Robert Colchin	Bromley and Kent	Also known as "Long Robin", a controversial figure who was held to be both the best batter and all-rounder of his time. An outstanding single wicket player, and a very influential match organiser.
Richard Newland	Slindon and Sussex	One of the most outstanding players of the sport's pioneering era before the introduction of the pitched delivery. Made the highest known individual score of the period.
John Bryant	Bromley and Kent	Brother of James Bryant. One of the best players for the Kent county team and a key member of Bromley Cricket Club.
John Cutbush	Maidstone and Kent	Rated among "the six best players in England".
Thomas Ridgeway	Sussex	Rated among "the six best players in England".
Tom Peake	Chelsfield and Kent	Kent player who was frequently called upon as a given man.
Val Romney	Sevenoaks and Kent	Noted for his leadership and described by James Love as "a mighty player".
William Hodsoll	Dartford and Kent	An outstanding bowler who was rated among "the six best players in England".
William Sawyer	Richmond and Surrey	Rated among "the six best players in England".
Lord Montfort	London	Patron and team captain who led the combined London, Middlesex & Surrey team in May 1743.
Stephen Rose	Chertsey	An Army deserter who was reported to be "a famous cricket player".

== Bibliography ==
- ACS (1981). A Guide to Important Cricket Matches Played in the British Isles 1709–1863. Nottingham: ACS. OCLC 85045528.
- Bowen, Rowland (1970). Cricket: A History of its Growth and Development. London: Eyre & Spottiswoode. ISBN 978-04-13278-60-9.
- Buckley, G. B. (1935). Fresh Light on 18th Century Cricket. Birmingham: Cotterell & Co. OCLC 23450280.
- Maun, Ian (2009). From Commons to Lord's, Volume One: 1700 to 1750. Cambridge: Roger Heavens. ISBN 978-19-00592-52-9.
- McCann, Tim (2004). Sussex Cricket in the Eighteenth Century (PDF). Vol. 88. Lewes: West Sussex Record Office. ISBN 978-08-54450-55-8.
- Waghorn, H. T. (1899). Cricket Scores, Notes, &c. From 1730–1773. Edinburgh: Blackwood. OCLC 1086375331.
- Waghorn, H. T. (2005) [1906]. The Dawn of Cricket. London: J. W. McKenzie. ISBN 978-09-47821-17-3.
- Wilson, Martin (2005). An Index to Waghorn. London: Bodyline Books (limited edition, by subscription only).
