= Thomas Ridgeway (cricketer) =

English cricketer (18th century)

Thomas Ridgeway (dates unknown) was an English cricketer of the mid-Georgian period who played for Slindon and Sussex under the patronage of Charles Lennox, 2nd Duke of Richmond. He also represented various England teams. A top-class player, he made numerous appearances in historically important matches, both eleven-a-side and single wicket. In the 1743 season, he was rated as one of "the six best players in England". (Note: Matches at this time were played on rudimentary pitches with a two-stump wicket. The batter used a curved bat and the bowler delivered the ball with an underarm action by bowling it all along the ground. The sport underwent an evolutionary change in the 1760s when bowlers began pitching the ball, still using an underarm action, and the modern straight bat was introduced in response.) (Note: Scorecard data till at least 1825 was never comprehensive, especially the dismissal information: bowling analyses lacked balls bowled and runs conceded; bowlers were not credited with wickets when the batsman was caught or stumped; in many matches, the means of dismissal were omitted.)

== 1743 ==
Perhaps the biggest match of the 1743 season was the single wicket encounter between Three of Kent and Three of England, which was played 11 July 1743 on the Artillery Ground. It was publicised as a contest involving "the six best players in England". The Daily Advertiser of Thursday, 7 July 1743 said Ridgeway would play for Kent alongside William Hodsoll and Val Romney. The England team was Richard Newland, William Sawyer, and John Bryant. (Note: The team selections are curious because Bryant, on the England team, was a Kent player; Ridgeway, on the Kent team, was a Sussex player.) However, Ridgeway had to withdraw, and his place was taken by John Cutbush, described as "a clockmaker from Maidstone".

Kent won the match by 2 runs. The London Evening Post estimated a crowd of 10,000. A return match was arranged at Sevenoaks Vine on 27 July, but "it did not come off".

== 1744 ==
Ridgeway played for Surrey & Sussex against London at the Artillery Ground on 2 June 1744. This match has left the sport's earliest-known scorecard. Ridgeway scored 6 in the first innings and did not bat in the second. The scorecard did not include bowling or dismissal details. Surrey & Sussex won by 55 runs.

== Surrey v Sussex, 1745 ==
Surrey and Sussex played three inter-county matches against each other in August 1745. The first was played Monday, 19 August on the Artillery Ground, and Surrey won "by several notches". The match was reported in the St James Evening Post on the same and the next day. Ridgeway and the Newland brothers played for Sussex. It was on the same day that Charles Edward Stuart raised his standard at Glenfinnan to formally begin the '45 Rebellion. The rebellion had little, if any, impact on cricket in south-east England.

Two days later, on the 21st, the teams met again on Moulsey Hurst, but the result is unknown. On the day of the match, the Daily Advertiser announced: "The Streatham Captain (i.e., George Williams), with his Flying Squadron of Red Caps, will attend at his grand Tent, to entertain Gentlemen with a cold Collation, the best French Wines, and other Liquours".

The final match, possibly a decider if Sussex won on the 21st, took place 26 August on Bury Hill, Arundel, also called Berry Hill. Ridgeway didn't play in this one, apparently because the Duke of Richmond, Sussex's patron, left him out of the team. It would seem that this decision backfired, and that Surrey won the game, in view of a comment made by Lord John Sackville in a letter to the Duke dated Saturday, 14 September:

I wish you had let Ridgeway play instead of your stopper behind it might have turned the match in our favour.

Sackville's comment confirms Ridgeway's prowess, but it is the last mention of him in the sources. Nothing is known of his private life, including his dates of birth and death.

== See also ==
- 1743 English cricket season
- 1745 English cricket season
- Bury Hill, Arundel
- Charles Lennox, 2nd Duke of Richmond
- History of English cricket (1726–1750)
- Richard Newland (cricketer)

== Bibliography ==
- ACS (1981). A Guide to Important Cricket Matches Played in the British Isles 1709–1863. Nottingham: ACS. OCLC 85045528. The list includes eleven-a-side matches known to have been played through the span of Newland's career.
- Buckley, G. B. (1935). Fresh Light on 18th Century Cricket. Birmingham: Cotterell & Co. OCLC 23450280.
- Haygarth, Arthur (1997) [1862]. Scores & Biographies, Volume 2 (1827–1840). Kennington: Frederick Lillywhite. ISBN 978-19-00592-23-9.
- McCann, Tim (2004). Sussex Cricket in the Eighteenth Century (PDF). Vol. 88. Lewes: West Sussex Record Office. ISBN 978-08-54450-55-8.
- Waghorn, H. T. (1899). Cricket Scores, Notes, &c. From 1730–1773. Edinburgh: Blackwood. OCLC 1086375331.
- Webber, Roy (1951). The Playfair Book of Cricket Records. London: Playfair Books Ltd. OCLC 753176177.
- Wilson, Martin (2005). An Index to Waghorn. London: Bodyline Books (limited edition, by subscription only).
