= John Cutbush (cricketer) =

English cricketer (18th century)

John Cutbush (dates unknown) was an English cricketer of the mid-Georgian period who came from Maidstone. He played for Maidstone Cricket Club and Kent. He also represented various England teams. A top-class player who was rated among the best in England, he made numerous appearances in historically important matches, both eleven-a-side and single wicket. (Note: Matches at this time were played on rudimentary pitches with a two-stump wicket. The batter used a curved bat and the bowler delivered the ball with an underarm action by bowling it all along the ground. The sport underwent an evolutionary change in the 1760s when bowlers began pitching the ball, still using an underarm action, and the modern straight bat was introduced in response.) (Note: Scorecard data till at least 1825 was never comprehensive, especially the dismissal information: bowling analyses lacked balls bowled and runs conceded; bowlers were not credited with wickets when the batsman was caught or stumped; in many matches, the means of dismissal were omitted.)

== 1743 ==
Three of Kent v Three of England was a three-a-side single wicket game, played 11 July 1743 on the Artillery Ground. The six players involved were publicised as "the best in England". They were William Hodsoll (Dartford), John Cutbush (Maidstone), and Val Romney (Sevenoaks) playing as Three of Kent; and Richard Newland (Slindon), William Sawyer (Richmond), and John Bryant (Bromley) playing as Three of England. Hodsoll and Newland were the captains.

The Daily Advertiser of Thursday, 7 July 1743 says Thomas Ridgeway of Sussex was to play alongside Hodsoll and Romney. Then, on Friday, 8 July, Cutbush, known to have been a clockmaker from Maidstone, was named instead of Ridgeway. Kent won by 2 runs. The London Evening Post estimated a crowd of 10,000. A return match was arranged at Sevenoaks Vine on 27 July, but "it did not come off".

== 1744 ==
Cutbush played for Kent v England at the Artillery Ground on 18 June 1744. He scored 3 in the first innings. In the second innings, with nine wickets down, Cutbush and Hodsoll formed the final partnership, and they scored the remaining runs needed to secure a one wicket victory. Cutbush scored 7*.

== See also ==
- 1743 English cricket season
- List of historically important English cricket teams
- List of Kent county cricketers to 1842
- Richard Newland

== Bibliography ==
- Buckley, G. B. (1935). Fresh Light on 18th Century Cricket. Birmingham: Cotterell & Co. OCLC 23450280.
- Haygarth, Arthur (1996) [1862]. Scores & Biographies, Volume 1 (1744–1826). Kennington: Frederick Lillywhite. ISBN 978-19-00592-23-9.
- Haygarth, Arthur (1997) [1862]. Scores & Biographies, Volume 2 (1827–1840). Kennington: Frederick Lillywhite. ISBN 978-19-00592-23-9.
- McCann, Tim (2004). Sussex Cricket in the Eighteenth Century (PDF). Vol. 88. Lewes: West Sussex Record Office. ISBN 978-08-54450-55-8.
- Waghorn, H. T. (1899). Cricket Scores, Notes, &c. From 1730–1773. Edinburgh: Blackwood. OCLC 1086375331.
- Webber, Roy (1951). The Playfair Book of Cricket Records. London: Playfair Books Ltd. OCLC 753176177.
- Wilson, Martin (2005). An Index to Waghorn. London: Bodyline Books (limited edition, by subscription only). [ISBN unspecified]
