= William Sawyer (cricketer) =

English cricketer (1712–1761

Personal information
- Born: c. 3 December 1712; Richmond, Surrey
- Died: c. 2 April 1761 (aged 48); Richmond, Surrey
- Source: CricketArchive, 5 April 2022

William Sawyer (c. 3 December 1712 – c. 2 April 1761) was an English cricketer who played during the 1730s and 1740s. He was mainly associated with Richmond and Surrey, but he also played for England teams. Although information about his career is limited by a lack of surviving data, he was a top-class player, and he made numerous appearances in historically important matches, both eleven-a-side and single wicket. Sawyer spent his whole life in Richmond, and was an innkeeper there. (Note: Matches at this time were played on rudimentary pitches with a two-stump wicket. The batter used a curved bat and the bowler delivered the ball with an underarm action by bowling it all along the ground. The sport underwent an evolutionary change in the 1760s when bowlers began pitching the ball, still using an underarm action, and the modern straight bat was introduced in response.) (Note: Scorecard data till at least 1825 was never comprehensive, especially the dismissal information: bowling analyses lacked balls bowled and runs conceded; bowlers were not credited with wickets when the batsman was caught or stumped; in many matches, the means of dismissal were omitted.)

== 1736 ==
In June 1736, there was a major single wicket match on Kennington Common and the report names Wakeland and George Oldner of London Cricket Club playing together against two "famous" Richmond players who are "esteemed the best two in England". Unfortunately the esteemed pair are not named, though one of them suffered serious facial injuries in this game when the ball came off his bat and hit his nose. The report rails against "human brutes" who insisted he should play on despite his injuries, the money they had staked being of much greater importance to them. It is believed that one of the Richmond players was William Sawyer, who was certainly active in the 1730s and who, in 1743, was acclaimed by name as "one of the best six players in England".

== 1743 ==
Sawyer is first definitely mentioned in a contemporary report of a celebrated single wicket "threes" game played at the Artillery Ground on Monday, 11 July 1743. The Daily Advertiser hailed that the six players involved as the "best in England". They were William Hodsoll (Dartford), Val Romney (Sevenoaks), and John Cutbush (Maidstone) (replacing Thomas Ridgeway of Sussex) who played as Three of Kent; and Richard Newland (Slindon), John Bryant (Bromley), and Sawyer, who played as Three of England. Kent won by 2 runs. The London Evening Post estimated a crowd of 10,000. A return match was arranged at Sevenoaks Vine on 27 July, but "it did not come off".

On Monday, 25 July 1743, Sawyer played as a given man for London against Addington at the Artillery Ground, but Addington won by an innings and 4 runs having scored 110 while London could only manage 32 and 74.

== Later years ==
In 1744, Sawyer played in both of the matches from which scorecards have survived. When London met Surrey & Sussex at the Artillery Ground on Saturday, 2 June, Sawyer was in the London team, possibly batting third, and scored 4 in each innings. Surrey & Sussex won by 55 runs. On Monday, 18 June, he was a given man in the Kent team that played England at the Artillery Ground, scoring 0 and 5 as Kent won a low-scoring game by 1 wicket.

Sawyer's last known appearance was on Monday, 31 August 1747, when he played in an important match for England v Kent at the Artillery Ground. The result is unknown. The match had been postponed earlier in the season because of a parliamentary election.

== See also ==
- 1743 English cricket season
- 1747 English cricket season
- Addington Cricket Club
- History of English cricket (1726–1750)
- List of English cricketers (1701–1786)
- List of Kent county cricketers to 1842
- Richard Newland (cricketer)
- Richmond Cricket Club (18th century)
- Slindon Cricket Club
- Stephen Dingate
- Val Romney

== Bibliography ==
- Buckley, G. B. (1935). Fresh Light on 18th Century Cricket. Birmingham: Cotterell & Co. OCLC 23450280.
- Haygarth, Arthur (1996) [1862]. Scores & Biographies, Volume 1 (1744–1826). Kennington: Frederick Lillywhite. ISBN 978-19-00592-23-9.
- Haygarth, Arthur (1997) [1862]. Scores & Biographies, Volume 2 (1827–1840). Kennington: Frederick Lillywhite. ISBN 978-19-00592-23-9.
- McCann, Tim (2004). Sussex Cricket in the Eighteenth Century (PDF). Vol. 88. Lewes: West Sussex Record Office. ISBN 978-08-54450-55-8.
- Waghorn, H. T. (1899). Cricket Scores, Notes, &c. From 1730–1773. Edinburgh: Blackwood. OCLC 1086375331.
- Webber, Roy (1951). The Playfair Book of Cricket Records. London: Playfair Books Ltd. OCLC 753176177.
