= George Kipps =

English cricketer (18th century)

George Kipps (born circa 1700) was an English cricketer of the mid-Georgian period born in Kemsing but later relocating to Eltham. He played for Sevenoaks and Kent. He also represented various England teams. A top-class player, and the sport's earliest-known accomplished wicket-keeper, he made numerous appearances in historically important matches, both eleven-a-side and single wicket. (Note: Matches at this time were played on rudimentary pitches with a two-stump wicket. The batter used a curved bat and the bowler delivered the ball with an underarm action by bowling it all along the ground. The sport underwent an evolutionary change in the 1760s when bowlers began pitching the ball, still using an underarm action, and the modern straight bat was introduced in response.) (Note: Scorecard data till at least 1825 was never comprehensive, especially the dismissal information: bowling analyses lacked balls bowled and runs conceded; bowlers were not credited with wickets when the batsman was caught or stumped; in many matches, the means of dismissal were omitted.) His name has sometimes been spelled "Kips".

== 1744 ==
Played for Kent v England at the Artillery Ground on 18 June 1744. Scored 12 & 10 (highest score in each innings). Stumped J. Bryant in the first innings, and this is the earliest-known stumping in cricket history. Also caught Bryant in the second innings.

== Earliest-known stumping ==
The earliest-known instance of a batsman being stumped was in 1744. J. Bryant (i.e., one of the brothers James or John Bryant) of England was dismissed by Kipps, the Kent wicket-keeper. The match was England v Kent on the Artillery Ground. The surviving match scorecard is the first to include dismissal information.

- See History of English cricket (1726–1750)#England teams for additional content.

Kipps is cricket's first renowned wicket-keeper. In this early era, wicket-keepers wore no protective padding and without gloves. Others in the 18th century were John Bell of Kent, Edward Gill of Buckinghamshire, Tom Sueter of Hampshire, Richard Simmons of Kent, and William Yalden of Surrey.

== 1746 ==
On 23 June 1746, Kent and Surrey were scheduled to play on the Artillery Ground. Kent's team consisted entirely of players from Bromley, Bexley, and Sevenoaks; these included Robert Colchin, George Kipps (wicket-keeper), John Bowra, James Bryant, John Bryant, and Robert Eures.

A combined teams match was played 7 July 1746 at Duppas Hill, Croydon, between Kent & Surrey and Addington & Bromley. The crowd was reported as "nearly ten thousand". George Kipps of Sevenoaks, the renowned wicket-keeper, played as a given man for Addington & Bromley. The title of the fixture indicates the strength of the Addington and Bromley clubs at this time. The London Evening Post on Thursday, 3 July announced: "No person allowed to bring any liquour that don't (sic) live in the parish". Kent & Surrey won by 4 runs.

On 14 July 1746, there was a return of the Addington & Bromley v Kent & Surrey match. This one was played on the Artillery Ground. George Kipps of Sevenoaks again played for the Addington & Bromley team as a given man. A report said: "Many hundreds of pounds were lost and won over this match".

== 1747 ==
- See 1747 English cricket season#Kent v England for additional content.

== See also ==
- History of English cricket (1726–1750)
- 1744 English cricket season
- Stumped
- 1746 English cricket season
- 1747 English cricket season
- List of Kent county cricketers to 1842

== Bibliography ==
- ACS (1981). A Guide to Important Cricket Matches Played in the British Isles 1709–1863. Nottingham: ACS. OCLC 85045528.
- Haygarth, Arthur (1996) [1862]. Scores & Biographies, Volume 1 (1744–1826). Kennington: Frederick Lillywhite. ISBN 978-19-00592-23-9.
- Haygarth, Arthur (1997) [1862]. Scores & Biographies, Volume 2 (1827–1840). Kennington: Frederick Lillywhite. ISBN 978-19-00592-23-9.
- Waghorn, H. T. (2005) [1906]. The Dawn of Cricket. London: J. W. McKenzie. ISBN 978-09-47821-17-3.
- Webber, Roy (1951). The Playfair Book of Cricket Records. London: Playfair Books Ltd. OCLC 753176177.
