= 1746 English cricket season =

Cricket season review

The Jacobite Rebellion was effectively over by the time the 1746 English cricket season got under way, the Battle of Culloden having been fought on 16 April. Details of 15 historically important matches are known. (Note: Any match listed in the ACS' Important Match Guide (1981) is historically important, and therefore of the highest standard, whether or not a scorecard might exist. The same applies to numerous matches discovered by researchers since 1981. For further information, see First-class cricket.)

== Eleven-a-side matches ==
=== Known results ===
Bromley played Addington, 12 May on Bromley Common, and Addington won "with great difficulty". A return match was arranged: "On Monday next (19th) they play their second match at Mr Smith's Pyd-Horse" (a reference to the pub adjacent to the Artillery Ground). There is no report of the return.

Addington & Lingfield played London & Surrey, 9 June on the Artillery Ground. A report says: "A Kent man (unidentified) assisted London and Surrey as a given man". The match was reported in the General London Evening Mercury as "Middlesex v Surrey" but the combined teams title seems to be more accurate. Addington & Lingfield (aka Middlesex) won "by a considerable number of notches".

Another combined teams match was played 7 July at Duppas Hill, Croydon, between Kent & Surrey and Addington & Bromley. The crowd was reported as "nearly ten thousand". George Kipps of Sevenoaks, the well-known wicket-keeper, played as a given man for Addington & Bromley. The title of the fixture indicates the strength of the Addington and Bromley clubs at this time. The London Evening Post on Thursday, 3 July announced: "No person allowed to bring any liquour that don't (sic) live in the parish". Kent & Surrey won by 4 runs.

On 4 August, England defeated Kent on the Artillery Ground. Nothing else is known about the match.

=== Unknown results ===
On 26 May, a combined Bromley & Chislehurst team was to play Addington on Bromley Common.

On 23 June, Kent and Surrey were scheduled to play on the Artillery Ground. Kent's team consisted entirely of players from Bromley, Bexley, and Sevenoaks; these included Robert Colchin, George Kipps (wicket-keeper), John Bowra, James Bryant, John Bryant, and Robert Eures.

On 14 July, there was a return of the Addington & Bromley v Kent & Surrey match. This one was played on the Artillery Ground. George Kipps of Sevenoaks again played for the Addington & Bromley team as a given man. A report said: "Many hundreds of pounds were lost and won over this match".

Also in July, London v Westminster, and London v Edmonton were pre-announced to be played on the Artillery Ground.

In August, Kent were to play England on Bromley Common. It is known that this one was postponed, but not if it was played later. Also in August, there was to be a return match between London and Edmonton. Finally, on 1 September a combined Chislehurst & London team were to play Addington on the Artillery Ground for a stake of £50.

== Single wicket ==
Monday, 21 July. There was a four-a-side match at the Artillery Ground between Four Millers of Bray Mills (in Berkshire) and Four Best Players of Addington. It was played for fifty pounds but the result is unknown. Thomas Waymark was by this time employed at Bray Mills and so he was probably involved.

Wednesday, 6 August. A three-a-side game between Long Robin's Side and Stephen Dingate's Side in the Artillery Ground involving "six players esteemed the best in England". The teams were Robert Colchin, John Bryant (both Bromley), and Joe Harris (Addington) versus Stephen Dingate (Surrey), Val Romney (Sevenoaks), and Richard Newland (Slindon). Dingate's team won the match. Hundreds of pounds were lost and won over the game. Newspapers pre-announcing the event named John Harris in Long Robin's team, but it was his brother Joe who actually played.

== First mentions ==
=== Clubs and teams ===
- Chislehurst & London
- Stephen Dingate's Side
- Edmonton

=== Players ===
- Robert Eures (Bexley and Kent)

== Bibliography ==
- ACS (1981). A Guide to Important Cricket Matches Played in the British Isles 1709–1863. Nottingham: ACS. OCLC 85045528.
- Buckley, G. B. (1935). Fresh Light on 18th Century Cricket. Birmingham: Cotterell & Co. OCLC 23450280.
- Maun, Ian (2009). From Commons to Lord's, Volume One: 1700 to 1750. Cambridge: Roger Heavens. ISBN 978-19-00592-52-9.
- McCann, Tim (2004). Sussex Cricket in the Eighteenth Century (PDF). Vol. 88. Lewes: West Sussex Record Office. ISBN 978-08-54450-55-8.
- Waghorn, H. T. (1899). Cricket Scores, Notes, &c. From 1730–1773. Edinburgh: Blackwood. OCLC 1086375331.
- Waghorn, H. T. (2005) [1906]. The Dawn of Cricket. London: J. W. McKenzie. ISBN 978-09-47821-17-3.
