= Mary Say =

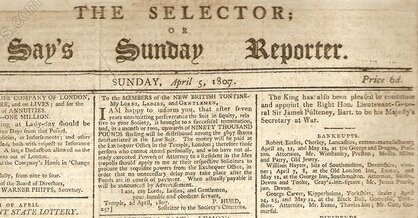
- "Say's Sunday Reporter" aka The Selector in 1807
- Born: 1740
- Died: 9 February 1832 (aged 91–92); Dartford, England
- Occupation: Newspaper publisher
- Known for: publishing The Gazetteer
- Spouses: Charles Green Say; Edward Vint

Mary Say born Mary Bemister later Mary Vint (1739/40 – 9 February 1832) was a British printer and newspaper publisher. From 1775 she was responsible for three titles after her husband Charles Green Say died. The Gazetteer was the daily title and Say was several times punished for libel.

== Life ==
Say may have been born in London or Somerset as the details are unknown. She comes to notice when she is about thirty and she marries Charles Green Say who was a publisher. The marriage was on 9 November 1769 at St George Botolph Lane (which is no longer extant as it was very close to the start of the Great Fire of London). The church was in Botoph Lane, which is the street she said she was from.

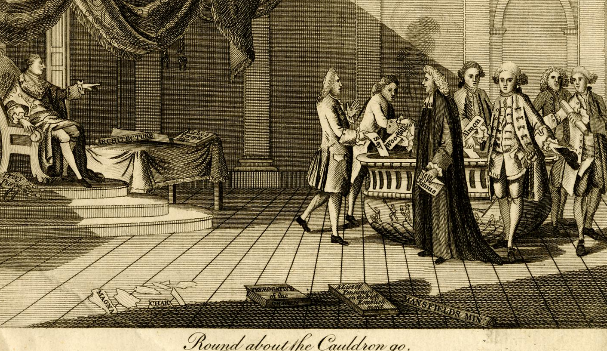
Anonymous satire about her husband's printing dating from 1770

Three newspapers were printed at the Gazetteer Printing-Office at 10 and 11 Ave Maria Lane and when her husband died in July 1775 she became wholly responsible. Her husband had been well known for publishing libels against the government - an anonymous print satires him being questioned by the King.

Say took a special interest in The Gazetteer which was her daily newspaper. The two other titles were the General Evening Post which was published twice a week and The Craftsman, which was also known as Say's Weekly Journal which had been started in 1758. It was published every Saturday. Say appears to have been a bold publisher as she was prosecuted several times. In 1778 she was fined for a libel on the constitution and in 1781 she libelled the Russian ambassador, Johann Matthias von Simolin. She was again fined and sentenced to six months in prison. In 1788 her publications about Pitt the Younger were debated in parliament and it was decided to prosecute her.

In 1787 she married Edward Vint, but she kept the name of Mary Say. In 1799 she launched the weekly paper Say's Sunday Reporter or The Selector. It was published until 1808. Say's Weekly Journal ended in 1810, which is when she appeared to retire.

Say died in Dartford in 1832.
