= George Dance the Elder =

English architect (1695–1768)

George Dance
- Born: 1695
- Died: 8 February 1768 (aged 72–73); Norton, England
- Children: James, Nathaniel, George, and 2 other sons

George Dance the Elder (1695 – 8 February 1768) was a British architect. He was the City of London surveyor and architect from 1735 until his death.

== Life ==
Originally a mason, George Dance was appointed Clerk of the city works to the City of London. In 1734, shortly before taking up the post, he had won a major commission from the city, for the Mansion House, the new residence for the Lord Mayor. He was one of three architects—the others being James Gibbs and Giacomo Leoni—who had been invited to submit designs. His building has a grand portico, and an "Egyptian Hall", so called because it uses an arrangement of columns described as Egyptian by Vitruvius. It was completed in 1752.

He also designed the Great Synagogue of London as well as the churches of St Leonard's, Shoreditch (1736–40), St Botolph's Aldgate (1741–44) and St Matthew's, Bethnal Green (1743–46). Further afield, Dance designed the Town Hall of Coleraine in Northern Ireland (1743; demolished in 1859).

Sir John Summerson included Dance in a list of London architects who he felt debased Palladianism, calling his Mansion House "cramped and overdressed".

George had five sons, three of whom enjoyed fame in their own right.

- Eldest son James Dance (1722–1744) became an actor and playwright connected with Drury Lane theatre, and took the name Love.
- Second son Giles
- Third son Sir Nathaniel Dance-Holland (1735–1811) was a notable painter.
- Fourth son William, "an ingenious modest man, is in a private situation. With a talent for musick, & much ingenuity He has attempted to get a living by miniature painting & by teaching as a School Master. Lord Camden knows him &, being at a Concert given by his Brother Sir Nathaniel, conceived the reason to be his situation in life. His Lordship soon after had a Concert & invited Sir Nathaniel & William who made an excuse, which His Lordship saw through & put off the day of his Concert. William was obliged to attend to the 2nd invitation & gave Lord C. an opportunity of showing an attention that the Brother had not."
- Fifth son George Dance the Younger (1741–1825) succeeded him as city architect.

Dance is buried in the churchyard of St Luke's Old Street, north of the City of London.

== Gallery of architectural work ==
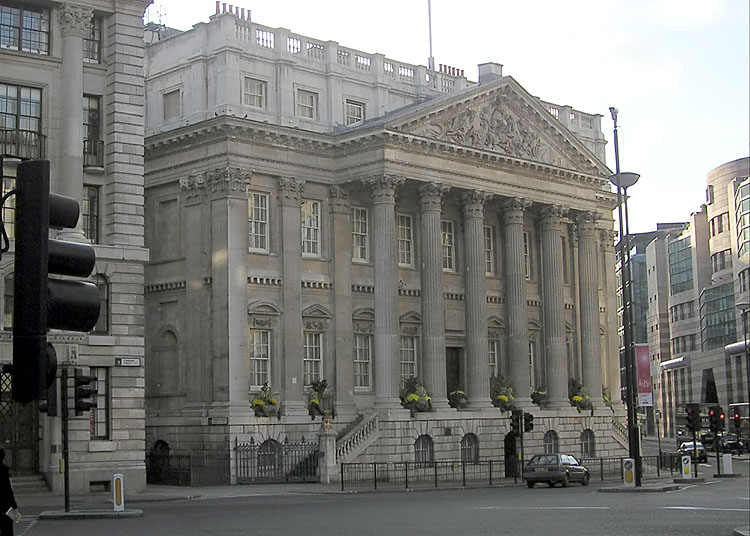
Mansion House, City of London.

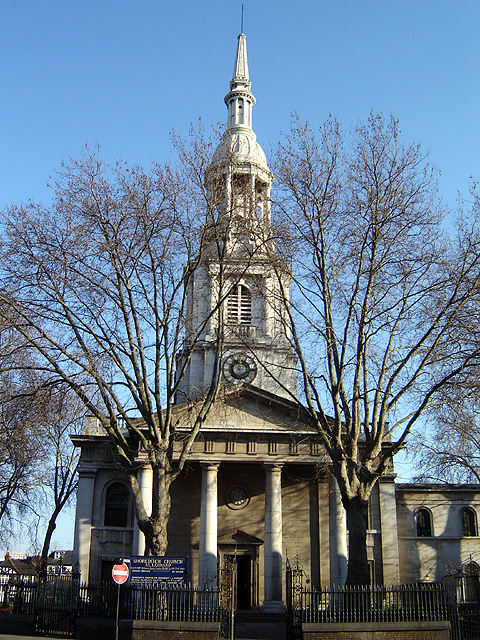
St. Leonard's Shoreditch, London

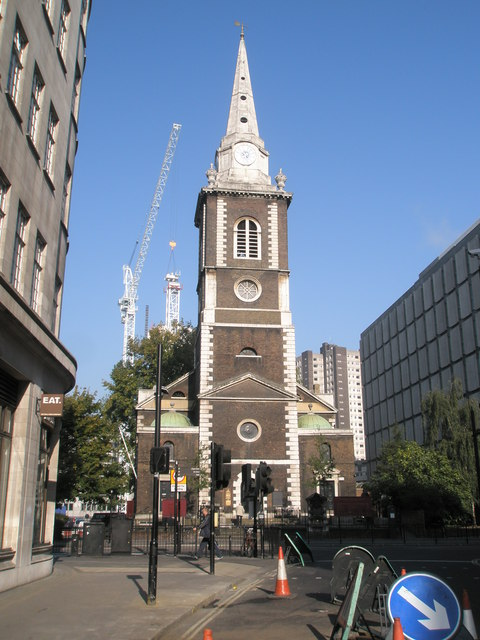
St. Botolph, Aldgate, London

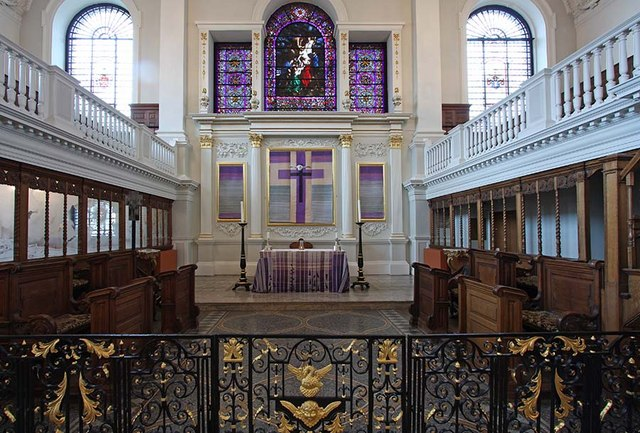
St. Botolph, Aldgate, London, interior
