= Woburn Cricket Club =

English cricket club

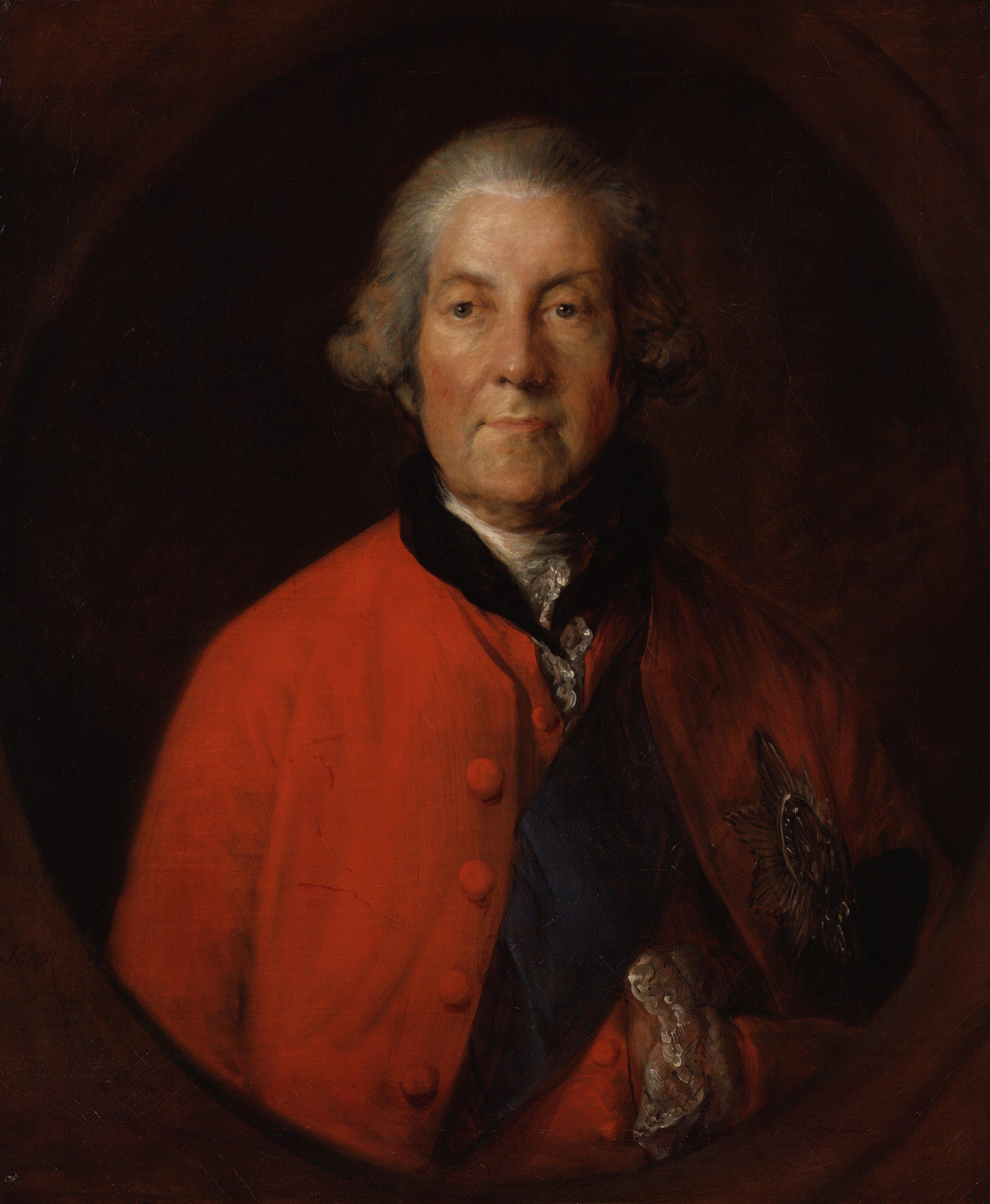
Portrait of John Russell, 4th Duke of Bedford by Thomas Gainsborough, c. 1770

Woburn Cricket Club was based at Woburn, Bedfordshire. It was formed by the then Duke of Bedford, who was an enthusiastic patron of cricket. The team's home matches were played at Woburn Park. Woburn played six known historically important matches from 1743 to 1744, all of them against London Cricket Club. (Note: Any match listed in the ACS' Important Match Guide (1981) is historically important, and therefore of the highest standard, whether or not a scorecard might exist. The same applies to numerous matches discovered by researchers since 1981. For further information, see First-class cricket.)

== History ==
Woburn Park is first recorded as a venue in August 1741 for Bedfordshire v Northamptonshire & Huntingdonshire. The combined Northamptonshire & Huntingdonshire team won. This is, incidentally, the earliest-known recorded mention of cricket in each of the three counties involved.

The Woburn team is first recorded on 27 and 28 May 1743 when it hosted London in two matches at Woburn Park. London won the first, and Woburn the second, both by unknown margins. A decider, then called a "conqueror", was arranged at the Artillery Ground on 13 June. This was won by Woburn. The winning margin was either 40 runs or 54 runs.

Two further matches against London were held on 1 and 8 August 1743. Both had close results as London won by 3 runs at Woburn on 1 August; and then by 1 wicket at the Artillery Ground on the 8th.

Woburn's last known match was at the Artillery Ground on 21 July 1744, but the result is unknown. The match had been postponed from 19 July as the venue became unavailable.

== Bibliography ==
- ACS (1981). A Guide to Important Cricket Matches Played in the British Isles 1709–1863. Nottingham: ACS. OCLC 85045528.
- ACS (1982). A Guide to First-class Cricket Matches Played in the British Isles. Nottingham: ACS. OCLC 10586869.
- Maun, Ian (2009). From Commons to Lord's, Volume One: 1700 to 1750. Cambridge: Roger Heavens. ISBN 978-19-00592-52-9.
- Waghorn, H. T. (1899). Cricket Scores, Notes, &c. From 1730–1773. Edinburgh: Blackwood. OCLC 1086375331.
- Waghorn, H. T. (2005) [1906]. The Dawn of Cricket. London: J. W. McKenzie. ISBN 978-09-47821-17-3.
