= Bury Hill, Arundel =

Cricket venue in West Sussex, England

Bury Hill
- Interactive map of Bury Hill
- Location: near Bury, West Sussex
- Coordinates: 50.903°N 0.581°W

Bury Hill is an area of West Sussex, England, north of Arundel and south-west of Bury. In the 18th century, its name was sometimes spelled Berry or Bery Hill, and it was used as a venue for cricket matches.

== Matches ==
An Arundel team played against the 1st Duke of Richmond's XI in 1702, but at an unknown venue, and two years before Arundel Cricket Club was founded.

The first match definitely played on Bury Hill was in 1725. It was between the 2nd Duke of Richmond's XI and Sir William Gage's XI on 20 July. They had intended to play at Richmond's Goodwood estate, but the report in a Daily Journal newspaper on 21 July confirms "Berry Hill" as the venue. The match, played before "a vast Concourse of People", was hosted by Thomas Howard, 8th Duke of Norfolk, who gave a ball at Arundel Castle in the evening. The newspaper said Richmond's XI "got the Victory above Forty, which was thought very much", and went on to praise the two teams as "the best that ever was seen to Play".

The next match was in June 1730 between the same teams, but the result is unknown. In August 1745, Bury Hill was used for a match between Sussex and Surrey, the third in a series between the two teams. Surrey are believed to have won the match because of a letter from Lord John Sackville to the Duke of Richmond, in which he says that if Thomas Ridgeway had played, "it might have turned the match in our favour". David Underdown says that Sussex were apparently a man short before the match, and a player called Martin from Henfield was recruited "at the last minute".

Bury Hill seems to have remained in use for cricket matches until the 1770s, as there are references to matches which were scheduled to be played there in 1771 and 1774.

== Bibliography ==
- Maun, Ian (2009). From Commons to Lord's, Volume One: 1700 to 1750. Cambridge: Roger Heavens. ISBN 978-19-00592-52-9.
- McCann, Tim (2004). Sussex Cricket in the Eighteenth Century (PDF). Vol. 88. Lewes: West Sussex Record Office. ISBN 978-08-54450-55-8.
- McColl, Paul J. (2000). A View from Long Off: The History of Cricket in Mayfield. Sussex: P. J. McColl. ISBN 978-09-53841-40-0.
- Underdown, David (2000). Start of Play. Westminster: Allen Lane. ISBN 978-07-13993-30-1 – via Internet Archive.
