= James Love (poet) =

British poet, playwright and actor

James Love (1721–1774) was the pseudonym of British poet, playwright and actor James Dance. He is best known for his poem Cricket: An Heroic Poem (1744).

== Life and work ==
Son of George Dance the Elder, who worked as an architect and city surveyor, Love was himself a cricketer, being a member of Richmond Cricket Club. Richmond was a leading club in the 1740s, and Love may have represented Surrey too. However, no details have survived of his playing career.

He was also likely the founder of the Theatre Royal in Richmond upon Thames, which he managed from 1766 to 1773. In 1763, at Drury Lane in London, he played the role of Falstaff, for which he became best known as an actor, his authorial pseudonym serving also as his stage name. In 1766 he played his signature role in a new play, William Kenrick's Falstaff's Wedding, intended as a sequel to Henry IV, Part 2. He performed, too, in both Dublin and Edinburgh, of which he was a sometime manager. Invited to Theatre Royal, Drury Lane, in 1762, he retained a connection to it for the rest of his life.

As a writer, Love met success with such Rome-inspired Pantomimes as The Witches; or, Harlequin Cherokee (1762), The Rites of Hecate; or, Harlequin from the Moon (1763) and The Hermit; or, Harlequin at Rhodes (1766), in addition to Cricket. His earliest work was Pamela (1742), an eponymous adaptation of Samuel Richardson's 1740 novel.

He is famous within sporting circles for his Cricket: An Heroic Poem (1744), whose line "The strokes re-echo o'er the spacious ground" has been quoted in the Oxford English Dictionary. Its subtitle reads thus: "Illustrated with the Critical Observations of Scriblerus Maximus. To which is Added an Epilogue, call'd 'Bucks Have at Ye All'. Spoken by Mr. King, at the Theatre Royal in Dublin, in the Character of Ranger, in The Suspicious Husband".

On 4 July 1745, the Daily Advertiser advertised it at 1/-. A footnote to the publication adds that it was "[p]rinted for W Bickerton at the Gazette in the Temple Exchange near the Inner Temple Gate, Fleet Street".

According to the cricket historian H. S. Altham, the poem "should be in every cricket lover's library" and "his description of the game goes with a rare swing".

== Family ==
Love was also the brother of George Dance the Younger, who took on the same occupation as his father. It is probable that both the Younger and the Elder helped to construct the Richmond Theatre. According to Dorothy Stroud, "references to the building are vague and two of them, while agreeing as to sponsors, differ as to the name of the designer. A third gives it to [David] Garrick and it is evident that there was a good deal of confusion as to the various participants."

== See also ==
- Cricket poetry

== Bibliography ==
- Altham, H. S.; Swanton, E. W. (1962). A History of Cricket, Volume 1 (to 1914) (5th ed.). London: George Allen & Unwin. OCLC 894274808.
- Nicoll, Allardyce. A History of English Drama 1660–1900. Cambridge University Press, 1955.
- "Performances at Richmond's Theatre Royale: 15 June 1765." London Borough of Richmond upon Thames. 10 October 2008. (accessed 22 October 2008).
