= Richmond Cricket Club (18th century) =

Historical English cricket team

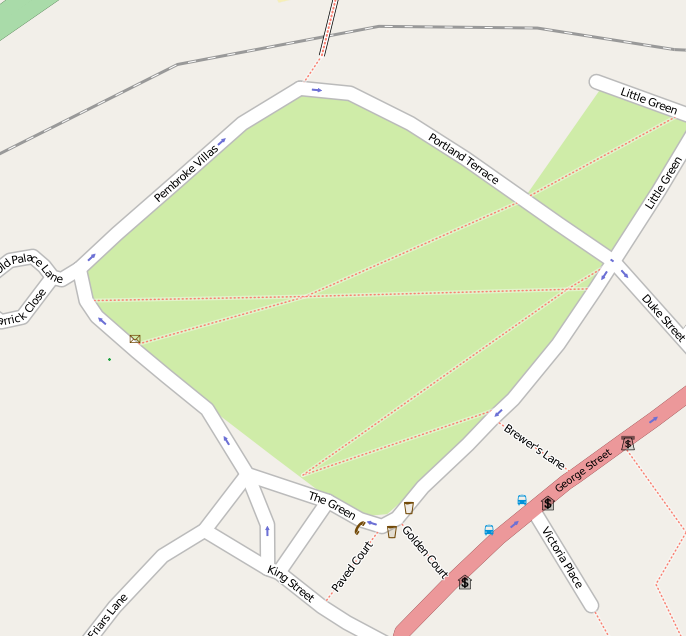
Map of Richmond Green

Richmond Cricket Club was based in Richmond (historically part of Surrey and now in London) and was a leading club during the 18th century. Its home venue was at Richmond Green. It ceased to exist sometime after 1805. The current Richmond club, which plays in the Middlesex County Cricket League, was founded in 1862.

== History ==
Richmond is first recorded as a team in July 1720. In June 1736, two of its players challenged a London duo in a single wicket contest. The two Richmond players were unnamed in the newspaper report but were nevertheless "esteemed the best two in England".

In 1740, a combined Richmond and Moulsey team played two matches against London. The first was incomplete due to rain and the second was won by London. In 1742, Richmond played London at the Artillery Ground in Finsbury "for a considerable sum" but the result is unknown.

The poet James Love, well known in cricket circles for his Cricket: An Heroic Poem (1744), was a playing member of the Richmond club but probably the greatest ever Richmond player was his teammate, the innkeeper William Sawyer. He had by this time established himself as "one of the best six players in England", and was a regular choice for big single wicket contests such as the one in 1743 between Three of Kent and Three of England. In the same year, there were two more single wicket contests between Five of Richmond and Five of London, one game on Richmond Green and the return at the Artillery Ground. In July 1743, Richmond twice played London and were beaten each time.

Richmond played London on Kennington Common in July 1744 but the result is unknown. Richmond declined in the latter half of the 1740s as there are no further references to the club apart from one match in 1749 when a Richmond & Ripley XI played London at the Artillery Ground, but again the result is unknown.

The club continued to play inter-parish matches until the end of the 18th century and saw something of a revival between 1799 and 1805 when it had a team of near important standard that played matches against clubs like Montpelier Cricket Club and Homerton Cricket Club.

The original Richmond club went out of existence sometime in the 19th century, possibly during the Napoleonic Wars as there is no record of it after 1805.

== Sources ==
- Buckley, G. B. (1935). Fresh Light on 18th Century Cricket. Birmingham: Cotterell & Co. OCLC 23450280.
- Haygarth, Arthur (1996) [1862]. Scores & Biographies, Volume 1 (1744–1826). Kennington: Frederick Lillywhite. ISBN 978-19-00592-23-9.
- Waghorn, H. T. (1899). Cricket Scores, Notes, &c. From 1730–1773. Edinburgh: Blackwood. OCLC 1086375331.
