= Daily Gazetteer =

English newspaper (1735–1797)

The Daily Gazetteer was an English newspaper which was published from 30 June 1735 until 1746. The paper was printed for T. Cooper, at the Globe in Pater-Noster Row, London by W. Arnall et al.

In June 1740 the opposition essay-paper The Champion joked that postal “Clerks of the Road” would not let it travel by post “for fear, perhaps, it shall quarrel with the Gazetteer upon the Road.”

The Gazetteer and New Daily Advertiser was printed by Charles Say until his death in 1775, after which it was printed by his widow, Mary Say. Say published three papers but the Gazetteer was the only daily publication. The London Gazette paper was then published as

- The Daily Gazetteer or London Advertiser from 1746 until 15 April 1748
- The London Gazetteer from 5 December 1748 until October 1753
- The Gazetteer and London Daily Advertiser from 1 November 1753 until April 1764
- The Gazetteer and New Daily Advertiser 27 from April 1764 until November 1796
- The Gazetteer from November 1796 until September 1797

== See also ==
- Burney Collection of Newspapers
