= London Evening Post =

English newspaper from 1727 to 1797

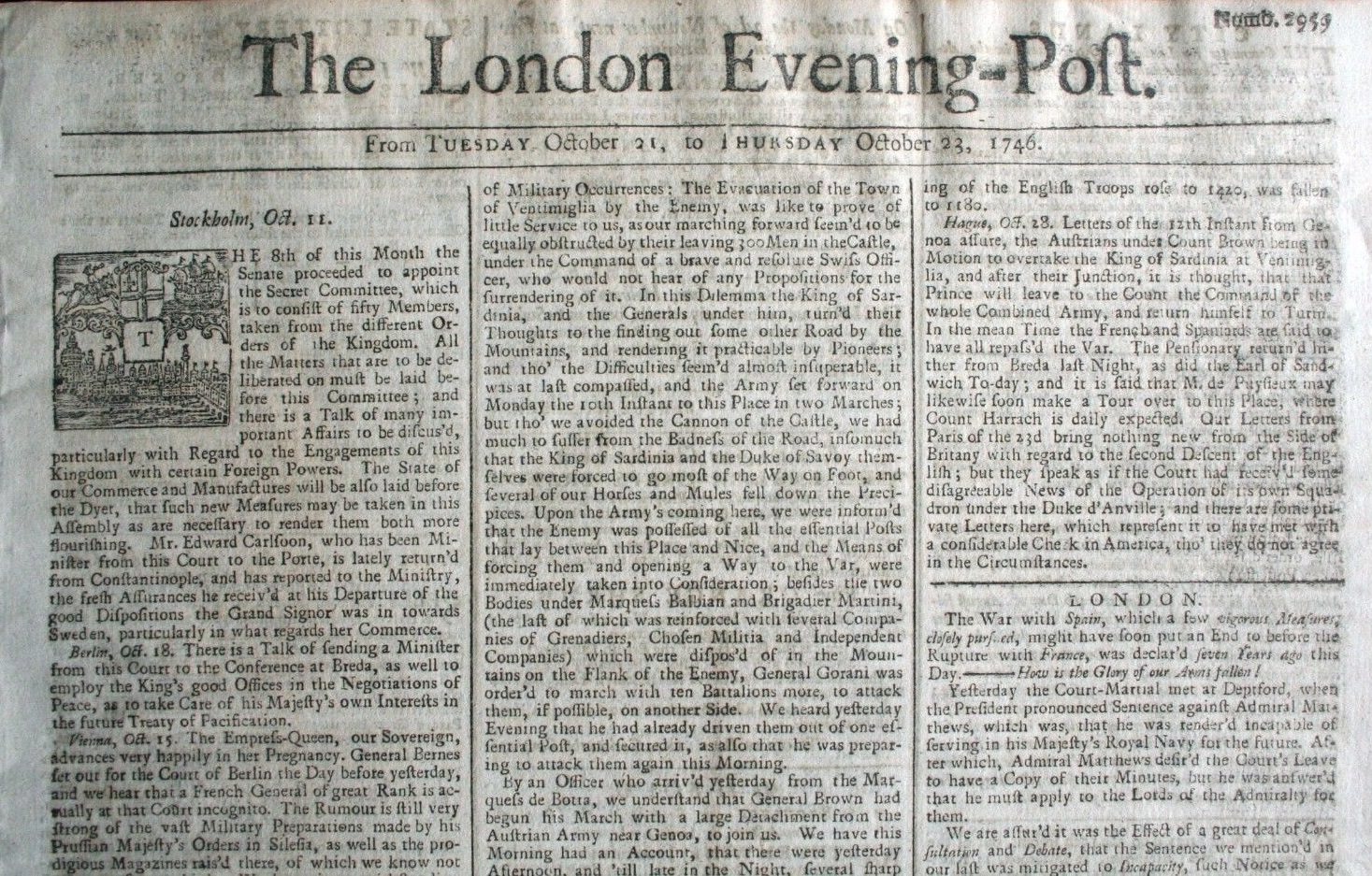
- Front page of the London Evening Post for 21–23 October 1746
- Type: Tri-weekly, later daily
- Owner: Richard Nutt
- Editor: Richard Nutt, Samuel Nevill, John Meres, John Miller
- Founded: 17 December 1727
- Ceased publication: ?
- Political alignment: Jacobite
- Headquarters: London

The London Evening Post was a pro-Jacobite Tory English language daily newspaper published in London, then the capital city of the Kingdom of Great Britain, from 1727 until 1797.

The paper was first published on 17 December 1727 by Richard Nutt (1694–1780) on a tri-weekly schedule matching the primary post nights (Tuesday, Thursday, and Saturday). It appears to have been immediately successful. Samuel Nevill took over the enterprise in 1730, and started to cover politics more than his predecessor (who mainly avoided it). (Nevill later emigrated to colonial America, where he served as a judge and speaker of the assembly in New Jersey, and as mayor of Perth Amboy, before dying in 1764).

John Meres (1698–1761, grandson of Sir Thomas Meres) took over management of the paper in 1737, first as a partner with Nutt, also printing the Daily Post. Meres was jailed for 10 weeks in 1740, for printing remarks about a act of Parliament regarding trade. Richard Nutt was found guilty of libel after publishing a letter about the government in 1754, and was sentenced to the pillory in addition to being fined. Meres was also once fined, for mentioning a nobleman in the newspaper. After Meres died in 1761, his son (also John) took over the business. The younger Meres was called before the House of Lords in 1764 to explain a "vague and slightly anti-Scottish remark" regarding Lord Hertford.

After Richard Nutt died in 1780, the paper also reportedly folded, though archives exist of the paper in the same name dated later than 1780. John Miller (c. 1744–1807), who was printer of the Post in the 1770s, was charged with libel five times and at times jailed for it; he later moved to South Carolina in 1783 and started newspapers there.
