= First known use of English cricket venues (1610–1825) =

Venues used in early cricket

This article records English cricket venues whose first known use was in or before the 1825 season.

The cutoff is set at 1825 because records since then became increasingly certain and comprehensive. On 28 July 1825, the Lord's Pavilion was destroyed by fire. MCC's entire archive, which included countless unique documents recording early matches, was irretrievably lost. With few exceptions, there is no certainty as to when any venue to 1825 was first used for cricket. This record is therefore inexhaustive, as ongoing research may discover earlier dates or additional venues.

Many of the early matches were played at unspecified venues, the sources giving only the name of a population centre, such as a village, parish, or town. Even when a venue is named, it tends to be a common, or other large tract of land. Each venue is listed once, in the first season that it is known to have staged a match, and the confirmed or assumed title of that match is also given.

Note #1: Online databases are excluded from this work as the scope is historical, and NOT statistical.
Note #2: Most of the matches mentioned were eleven-a-side, while others were single wicket events. In general, they were historically important. The list does include some minor matches—two local teams; "gentlemen only"; senior citizens only; etc.—but the objective here is to capture the venues, and the matches are incidental.

== 1610 to 1730 ==
season	venue	location	match / notes
1610	(unspecified)	Chevening, Kent	Weald and Upland v Chalkhill. World's earliest-known organised match.
1646	Coxheath Common	Coxheath, Kent	Coxheath v Maidstone. Earliest-known "odds" match (two of Coxheath against four of Maidstone); possibly single wicket.
1666	Richmond Green	Richmond, Surrey	In a letter, Sir Robert Paston mentioned "a game of criquett on Richmond Green".
1677	"Ye Dicker"	Herstmonceux, Sussex	Thomas Lennard, 1st Earl of Sussex received £3 at a match on "ye Dicker", which was a common near Herstmonceux.
1685	Mitcham Cricket Green	Mitcham, Surrey	Based on a claim that Mitcham Cricket Club and its ground originated in 1685, but there is no evidence to support it.
1694	(unspecified)	Lewes, Sussex	The accounts of Sir John Pelham record that he paid 2s 6d for a wager concerning a match in Lewes.
1700	Clapham Common	Clapham, Surrey	A series of ten-a-side matches was announced in a newspaper.
1705	(unspecified)	Town Malling, Kent	West of Kent v Chatham. The primary source gave the curious location of "Maulden", which doesn't exist. It is generally believed that Maulden was Town Malling.
1707	Duppas Hill	Croydon, Surrey	Croydon v London.
1707	Lamb's Conduit Field	Holborn, Middlesex	London v Mitcham.
1709	Dartford Brent	Dartford, Kent	Kent v Surrey. Ostensibly, the earliest known "inter-county" match, but it is believed to have been an "inter-parish" match involving two villages on either side of the county boundary.
1718	White Conduit Fields	Islington, Middlesex	London v Rochester Punch Club.
1723	Moulsey Hurst	Moulsey, Surrey	Surrey v London.
1724	(unspecified)	Chingford, Essex	Chingford v Edwin Stead's XI. The match is tentatively believed to have been played in Chingford, but there can be no certainty. Stead sued his opponents for unpaid wagers. Following the court case, the match was "played out" in September 1726, but on Dartford Brent. If the original did take place in Chingford, it is the earliest known match played in Essex.
1724	Kennington Common	Kennington, Surrey	London v Dartford.
1724	Penshurst Park	Penshurst, Kent	Penshurst, Tunbridge Wells & Wadhurst v Dartford.
1725	Artillery Ground	Finsbury, Middlesex	The Honourable Artillery Company (HAC) took issue with Mr Robinson, apparently the groundskeeper, saying he was responsible for "abuse done to the herbage of the ground", not only by horses but "also by Crickett Players".
1725	Bury Hill	Arundel, Sussex	2nd Duke of Richmond's XI v Sir William Gage's XI.
1727	(unspecified)	Cranbrook, Kent	Oak Apple Day senior citizens' match.
1727	Peper Harow	Godalming, Surrey	Alan Brodrick's XI v 2nd Duke of Richmond's XI.
1727	Warehorne Green	Warehorne, Kent	Warehorne XII v Hawkshurst XII.
1729	"The Downs"	Lewes, Sussex	Edwin Stead's XI v Sir William Gage's XI
1729	(unspecified)	Farnham, Surrey	Surrey v Kent. Farnham was later noted for Holt Pound.
1729	(unspecified)	Gloucester, Gloucestershire	A local game on 22 September 1729 is the earliest known reference to cricket in both the city and the county.
1729	Walworth Common	Walworth, Surrey	Kent v Sussex. Earliest known match involving a team expressly called Sussex.
1729	The "Woolpack"	Islington, Middlesex	Gentlemen of Middlesex v Gentlemen of London. The first match known to include "Gentlemen" in its title; also the first known to involve a team called Middlesex. The match was listed under 1728 for over a century. In 2007, it was realised that there had been a dating error. The given day of the week did not match the calendar, because 5 August 1728 was a Monday, not a Tuesday as originally transcribed.
1730	(unspecified)	Blackheath, Kent	Greenwich v London.
1730	Datchet Common	Datchet, Buckinghamshire	Local match. Datchet is now in Berkshire.
1730	The Dripping Pan	Lewes, Sussex	2nd Duke of Richmond's XI v Sir William Gage's XI.
1730	Epsom Down	Epsom, Surrey	Epsom v Sunbury.
1730	Frog Lane	Islington, Middlesex	London v Kent.
1730	Gray's Inn Lane	Gray's Inn, Middlesex	London v Kent.
1730	Kew Green	Kew, Surrey	Brentford v Kent.
1730	Merrow Down	Guildford, Surrey	Surrey v Sussex.
1730	Mickleham Down	Mickleham, Surrey	Surrey v Sussex.
1730	Putney Heath	Putney, Surrey	Putney v Fulham.
1730	(unspecified)	Tonbridge, Kent	A twelve-a-side game which was apparently a big event.
1730	Westerham Common	Westerham, Kent	Kent v Brentford.

== 1731 to 1750 ==
season	venue	location	match / notes
1731	Chelsea Common	Chelsea, Middlesex	Chelsea v Fulham.
1731	(unspecified)	Chichester, Sussex	2nd Duke of Richmond's XI v Thomas Chambers' XI. This was the second of their three matches in 1731.
1731	Dulwich Common	Dulwich, Surrey	Surrey v Kent.
1731	(unspecified)	Maidstone, Kent	Captain Beak v Lieutenant Coke. A single wicket match won by Beak.
1731	Parsons Green	Fulham, Middlesex	Fulham v Chelsea.
1731	Sanderstead Common	Sanderstead, Surrey	Surrey v Thomas Chambers' XI.
1731	Smitham Bottom	Coulsdon, Surrey	Surrey v East Grinstead.
1731	Sunbury Common	Sunbury-on-Thames, Surrey	Sunbury v Kent.
1732	(unspecified)	Epping Forest, Essex	Essex & Hertfordshire v London. The earliest recorded mention of cricket in connection with the county of Hertfordshire.
1733	Ealing Common	Ealing, Middlesex	Acton & Ealing v London.
1734	Vine Cricket Ground	Sevenoaks, Kent	Kent v Sussex. Also known as Sevenoaks Vine.
1735	Bromley Common	Bromley, Kent	Kent v London. The game was marred by crowd trouble.
1735	Tothill Fields	Westminster, Middlesex	Westminster v London.
1736	Barnes Common	Barnes, Surrey	Surrey v London.
1736	Laleham Burway	Chertsey, Surrey	Chertsey v Croydon.
1736	White Lion Fields	Streatham, Surrey	Streatham v London.
1737	Hyde Park	London	Frederick, Prince of Wales' XI v Sir William Gage's XI.
1737	(unspecified)	Ilford, Essex	Essex v London. The earliest known match that was definitely played in the county of Essex.
1737	(unspecified)	Ware, Hertfordshire	Hertford v Brentwood.
1738	Chislehurst Common	Chislehurst, Kent	Chislehurst v Horsmonden.
1738	(unspecified)	Dorchester, Dorset	Two local teams.
1738	(unspecified)	Horsmonden, Kent	Horsmonden v Chislehurst.
1740	New Ground, Uxbridge Moor	Uxbridge, Middlesex	Berkshire, Buckinghamshire & Hertfordshire v London. First known mentions of Berkshire and Buckinghamshire in terms of county cricket.
1741	(unspecified)	Charlwood, Surrey	Surrey v London.
1741	Cow Meadow	Northampton	Huntingdonshire & Northamptonshire v Bedfordshire.
1741	Stansted Park	Chichester, Sussex	Slindon v Portsmouth.
1741	Woburn Park	Woburn, Bedfordshire	Bedfordshire v Huntingdonshire & Northamptonshire.
1743	Marsh's New Ground	Rochester, Kent	Rochester v Dartford.
1745	Addington Hills	Addington, Surrey	Addington v London.
1747	Ripley Green	Ripley, Surrey	Bromley & Ripley v London.
1748	Mr Siddle's Ground	Deptford, London	Deptford & Greenwich v London.
1748	Peckham Rye Common	Peckham Rye, London	Lambeth v London.
1749	Barnet Common	Chipping Barnet, Hertfordshire	Middlesex v Hertfordshire.

== 1751 to 1770 ==
season	venue	location	match / notes
1751	Hayes Common	Bromley, Kent	Addington v Hadlow.
1751	Raby Castle	County Durham	1st Earl of Northumberland's XI v 3rd Duke of Cleveland's XI.
1751	(unspecified)	Somerset	Local match.
1751	Stanwick	Richmond, North Yorkshire	3rd Duke of Cleveland's XI v 1st Earl of Northumberland's XI.
1751	(unspecified)	Warwickshire	Local match.
1752	Durdham Down	Bristol, Gloucestershire	Bristol v London.
1752	Long Down	Chichester, Sussex	Sussex v Surrey.
1752	Upper Fountain	Deptford, Kent/Surrey	Deptford v Westminster.
1753	(unspecified)	Dover, Kent	Dover v Dartford.
1753	Broadhalfpenny Down	Hambledon, Hampshire	Hambledon v Surrey.
1754	Barrack Field	Woolwich, Kent	Woolwich v Dartford.
1754	(unspecified)	Brompton, Kent	Chatham v Dartford.
1754	(unspecified)	Guildford, Surrey	Surrey v Sussex.
1754	Bowling Green, Lavington Common	Petworth, Sussex	Midhurst & Petworth v Slindon.
1755	(unspecified)	Cambridge	Cambridge University v Eton College.
1755	Hampton Court Green	Hampton, Middlesex	Hampton v Kingston.
1757	Brampton Moor	Chesterfield, Derbyshire	Wirksworth v Sheffield.
1761	The Crown	Billericay, Essex	Essex v Kent
1761	Chapeltown Moor	Leeds	Two Elevens
1762	(unspecified)	Carshalton	Surrey v Kent
1764	Ampton Racecourse	Bury St Edmunds, Suffolk	Suffolk v Norfolk
1764	Henfield Common	Henfield, Sussex	Arundel v East Sussex
1764	Romford Racecourse	Romford, Essex	Romford v Dartford
1764	Scole Common	Scole, Suffolk	Suffolk v Norfolk
1765	(unspecified)	Sheffield	Sheffield v Leeds
1766	Bishopsbourne Paddock	Bishopsbourne, Kent	Bourne v Dartford
1767	Caterham Common	Caterham, Surrey	Caterham v Hambledon
1768	(unspecified)	Stamford Hill, Middlesex	Middlesex v Surrey
1769	Guildford Bason	Guildford, Surrey	Caterham v Hambledon
1769	(unspecified)	Stanmore, Middlesex	Middlesex v London

== Remainder ==
This is a work in progress, and the main task pending is the addition, with citations, of the following venues to one of the tables. Most if not all of the necessary citations can be found in the season review articles—e.g., 1771 English cricket season.

Note that this list may not be exhaustive.

First mentions from 1771 to 1825 are:

- 1771 Forest New Ground, Nottingham Nottingham v Sheffield
- 1773 Chatham Lines Chatham v Bourne
- 1774 Peasmarsh (unspecified) Sussex v Maidstone
- 1775 Kilmiston Down Hambledon Parish v Hampshire
- 1775 Old Field, Bray Maidenhead v Risborough
- 1776 Cheden Holt Hampshire v England
- 1776 Tichborne Down Alresford v Catherington & Petersfield
- 1777 Old Park, Canterbury Sir H. Mann's XI v Duke of Dorset's XI
- 1778 Itchin Stoke Down Hambledon Club v Hambledon Parish
- 1779 Henley (unspecified) Oxfordshire v Berkshire
- 1779 Maidenhead Thicket Berkshire Club v Berkshire & Hampshire
- 1779 Odiham Down Alresford v Berkshire
- 1780 Priestwood Common Maidenhead v Chertsey
- 1780 The Nythe, Alresford Alresford v Alton & Odiham
- 1781 Barrowcliffe Meadow, Leicester Leicester v Melton Mowbray
- 1781 Benson Common, Oxfordshire Oxfordshire v Berkshire
- 1781 Loughborough (unspecified) Leicester v Nottingham
- 1782 Windmill Down Hampshire v England
- 1783 Melton Mowbray (unspecified) Melton Mowbray v Nottingham
- 1783 Strood (unspecified) Strood v Dartford
- 1784 Holt Pound, Farnham Farnham v Alton & Odiham
- 1784 Langton Park, Hornchurch Hornchurch v Dartford
- 1784 Little Marlow (unspecified) Buckinghamshire v Berkshire
- 1785 Langley Broom Bucks v Berkshire
- 1785 Lingfield Common Lingfield v Sussex
- 1785 North Green, Reading Farnham v Petworth
- 1785 Nottis Green, Beaconsfield Bucks v Herts
- 1785 Petworth Park Petworth v Farnham
- 1786 Bearsted Green Maidstone v Kent
- 1786 Hayley Green, Warfield Berkshire v Middlesex
- 1786 Northchapel (unspecified) Farnham v Hampshire & Sussex
- 1786 Thursley (unspecified) Thursley v Six Parishes
- 1787 Amberley Hill West Sussex v East Sussex
- 1787 Hinckley (unspecified) Leicester v Coventry
- 1787 Hornchurch (unspecified) Essex v White Conduit Club
- 1787 Lord's Old Ground White Conduit Club v Middlesex
- 1787 Perriam Down, Ludgershall T. A. Smith's XI v Winchilsea's XI
- 1787 Star Inn, Coxheath Kent v Hampshire
- 1787 Swanscombe Park Kent v Essex
- 1787 Titchbourne Down, Alresford Alresford v Odiham
- 1788 Lutterworth (unspecified) Leicester v Coventry
- 1788 Warfield (unspecified) Surrey v Windsor Forest
- 1789 Aberdeen (unspecified) Gordon Castle Club v 55th Regiment
- 1789 Dandelion Paddock East Kent v Isle of Thanet
- 1789 New Ground, Uxbridge Moor Uxbridge v Moulsey Hurst
- 1790 Burley-on-the-Hill, Rutland Winchilsea's XI v T. A. Smith's XI
- 1790 Meopham (unspecified) Meopham v Chatham
- 1790 Prince of Wales Ground, Brighton Brighton v Lambehurst & Wadhurst
- 1790 Tunbridge Wells (unspecified) Tunbridge Wells v Brighton
- 1790 Woodburn Down Lambehurst & Wadhurst v Brighton
- 1791 Eton Brocas Eton & Windsor v Warfield
- 1791 Goodwood Park West Sussex v Hambledon Town
- 1791 King's Meadow, Nottingham Nottingham v MCC
- 1791 Waltham Abbey Marsh Waltham v Hornchurch
- 1792 Cobham Park, Gravesend Kent v Hampshire
- 1793 Navestock, Essex R. Newman's XI v R. Leigh's XI
- 1795 Penenden Heath Kent v England
- 1795 Wheatsheaf Common Frensham v Bramshot
- 1796 Aram's New Ground, Walworth Thursday/Montpelier v MCC
- 1797 Swaffham Racecourse Winchilsea's XI v Lennox's XI
- 1798 Wetherby (unspecified) Yorkshire Militia v Nottingham Militia
- 1800 Mansfield (unspecified) Nottingham v Sheffield
- 1800 St Margaret's Pasture, Leicester Leicester v Nottingham
- 1800 Storrington (unspecified) Storrington v Sussex
- 1800 Thames Ditton (unspecified) Thames Ditton v London
- 1800 Warsop (unspecified) Nottingham v Sheffield XXII
- 1802 Esburn Park, Sussex North Sussex v South Sussex
- 1802 Hampstead Heath Hampstead & Highgate v MCC
- 1803 Clifford's Park, Rickmansworth H. C. Woolridge's XI v W. R. Capel's XI
- 1804 Homerton (unspecified) Homerton v MCC
- 1806 Bowman's Lodge, Dartford Kent v England
- 1808 Woodford Wells, Essex Essex XIII v Homerton XIII
- 1811 High Down Hill, Sussex Sussex v Storrington
- 1811 Lord's Middle Ground B Aislabie's XI v G Osbaldeston's XI
- 1814 Lord's MCC v St John's Wood
- 1814 Royal New Ground, Brighton Brighton v Epsom
- 1815 Napps, Wrotham Kent v England
- 1817 Parker's Piece Cambridgeshire v Cambridge University
- 1818 Newmarket Heath Cambridgeshire v Holt (Norfolk)
- 1821 Bury St Edmunds School Ground Bury St Edmunds v Cambridgeshire
- 1821 Holt, Norfolk Holt (Norfolk) v Nottingham
- 1821 The Burys, Godalming Godalming v MCC
- 1821 University Ground, Cambridge Cambridge University v Cambridgeshire
- 1822 Chester (unspecified) Cheshire v Liverpool
- 1822 Darnall Old Ground, Sheffield Sheffield XV v Nottingham XI
- 1822 Race Ground, Buxton Bakewell v Manchester
- 1822 West Kent CC, Chislehurst Kent v MCC
- 1823 Bramshill Park Hampshire v England
- 1823 Saffron Walden (unspecified) Saffron Walden v Bury St Edmunds
- 1823 Salford Crescent, Broughton Manchester v Liverpool
- 1824 Darnall New Ground, Sheffield Sheffield v Leicester
- 1824 Rectors Fields, Liverpool Liverpool v Manchester
- 1824 The Cricket Field, Biggleswade Biggleswade v Bury St Edmunds
- 1825 Barker's Ground, Leicester Leicester v Sheffield
- 1825 Hawkhurst Moor Kent v Sussex
- 1825 Rougham Park, Bury St Edmunds Bury St Edmunds v Nottingham

== See also ==
- History of cricket to 1725
- History of English cricket (1726–1750)
- History of English cricket (1751–1775)
- History of English cricket (1776–1800)
- History of English cricket (1801–1825)
- List of cricket grounds in England and Wales
- List of historically important English cricket teams
- List of occasional English cricket XIs
- Earliest references to cricket in English and Welsh counties

== Bibliography ==
- ACS (1981). A Guide to Important Cricket Matches Played in the British Isles 1709–1863. Nottingham: ACS. OCLC 85045528.
- Bowen, Rowland (1970). Cricket: A History of its Growth and Development. London: Eyre & Spottiswoode. ISBN 978-04-13278-60-9.
- Buckley, G. B. (1935). Fresh Light on 18th Century Cricket. Birmingham: Cotterell & Co. OCLC 23450280.
- Buckley, G. B. (1937). Fresh Light on pre-Victorian Cricket. Birmingham: Cotterell & Co. OCLC 23469107.
- Major, John (2007). More Than A Game. London: HarperCollins. ISBN 978-00-07183-64-7.
- Marshall, John (1961). The Duke Who Was Cricket. London: Frederick Muller Ltd. OCLC 11214571.
- Maun, Ian (2009). From Commons to Lord's, Volume One: 1700 to 1750. Cambridge: Roger Heavens. ISBN 978-19-00592-52-9.
- Maun, Ian (2011). From Commons to Lord's, Volume Two: 1751 to 1770. Martin Wilson. ISBN 978-0-9569-0660-1.
- McCann, Tim (2004). Sussex Cricket in the Eighteenth Century. Lewes: Sussex Record Society. ISBN 978-08-54450-55-8.
- Underdown, David (2000). Start of Play. Westminster: Allen Lane. ISBN 978-07-13993-30-1.
- Waghorn, H. T. (1899). Cricket Scores, Notes, &c. From 1730–1773. Edinburgh: Blackwood. OCLC 1086375331.
- Waghorn, H. T. (2005) [1906]. The Dawn of Cricket. London: J. W. McKenzie. ISBN 978-09-47821-17-3.
- Wilson, Martin (2005). An Index to Waghorn. London: Bodyline Books (limited edition, by subscription only). [ISBN unspecified]
