= 1764 English cricket season =

Cricket season review

The 1764 English cricket season marks the beginning of the 'Hambledon Era' in earnest, and it is believed to be about this time that the Hambledon Club was founded. Chertsey and Hambledon, by now the leading teams in cricket, played each other three times. Details of these and five other historically important eleven-a-side matches are known. (Note: Any match listed in the ACS' Important Match Guide (1981) is historically important, and therefore of the highest standard, whether or not a scorecard might exist. The same applies to numerous matches discovered by researchers since 1981. For further information, see First-class cricket.)

== Chertsey v Hambledon ==
Chertsey hosted Hambledon 10 and 11 September on Laleham Burway; Hambledon won by 4 wickets. The team scores were: Chertsey 48 and 127; Hambledon 76 and 100–6. The stakes were £20 a side. At the end of the first day's play, Chertsey had scored 115 in their second innings (number of wickets unknown), and so led by 87. They added 12 in the morning, and Hambledon needed exactly 100 to win. Hambledon reached their target with four wickets in hand, after losing their first three for only four runs.

In his book, Ashley Mote speculated about certain Hambledon players who could have taken part in this match. However, there are no contemporary sources which support his conjecture. The only Hambledon player who definitely did take part was Peter Stewart, who broke a finger; John Edmeads and Thomas Baldwin played for Chertsey, and shared a partnership of more than 40. One of the people listed by Mote was Squire Thomas Land, who may or may not have been an actual player. Hambledon was called 'Squire Land's Club' by both the Whitehall Evening Post and the St James Chronicle in September 1764, but it is evident that he 'deserted the Club' sometime between then and 1769.

On 17 and 18 September, Hambledon played Chertsey on (probably) Broadhalfpenny Down, and Chertsey won by 2 wickets. This was the return match to the above. The two clubs apparently agreed to stage a decider on 24 September, but it is not known if it ever took place.

== Other events ==
There were three matches between the county teams of Norfolk and Suffolk. The first was played 23 August at Ampton Racecourse, near Bury St Edmunds. It was reported in the Gazetteer & London Daily Advertiser on Tuesday, 28 August. Norfolk won by an unknown margin. The other two matches were played 10 and 12 September on Scole Common in Suffolk. Suffolk won both, the second one "with the greatest of ease".

A Romford v Dartford match was announced in the Chelmsford Chronicle on Friday, 24 August. It was due to be played 28 August on the Romford Racecourse.

The Sussex Weekly Advertiser reported on Monday, 24 September, that a match between Arundel and East Sussex was played 21 September on Henfield Common. Arundel won by 2 wickets.

== First mentions ==
=== Clubs and teams ===
- East Sussex
- Norfolk (pre-1876)
- Romford
- Suffolk (pre-1864)

=== Players ===
- Thomas Baldwin (Chertsey)
- Thomas Land (Hambledon/Hampshire)
- Peter Stewart (Hambledon/Hampshire)

=== Venues ===
- Ampton Racecourse, Bury St Edmunds
- Scole Common
- Romford Racecourse, Romford
- Henfield Common

== Bibliography ==
- ACS (1981). A Guide to Important Cricket Matches Played in the British Isles 1709–1863. Nottingham: ACS. OCLC 85045528.
- Ashley-Cooper, F. S. (1924). Hambledon Cricket Chronicle: 1772–1796. London: Jenkins. OCLC 38498574.
- Buckley, G. B. (1935). Fresh Light on 18th Century Cricket. Birmingham: Cotterell & Co. OCLC 23450280.
- Buckley, G. B. (1937). Fresh Light on pre-Victorian Cricket. Birmingham: Cotterell & Co. OCLC 23469107.
- Mote, Ashley (1997). The Glory Days of Cricket. Robson. ISBN 978-1-8610-5111-0.
- Waghorn, H. T. (1899). Cricket Scores, Notes, &c. From 1730–1773. Edinburgh: Blackwood. OCLC 1086375331.
- Waghorn, H. T. (2005) [1906]. The Dawn of Cricket. London: J. W. McKenzie. ISBN 978-09-47821-17-3.
