= History of cricket to 1725 =

Origin and development of cricket (to 1725)

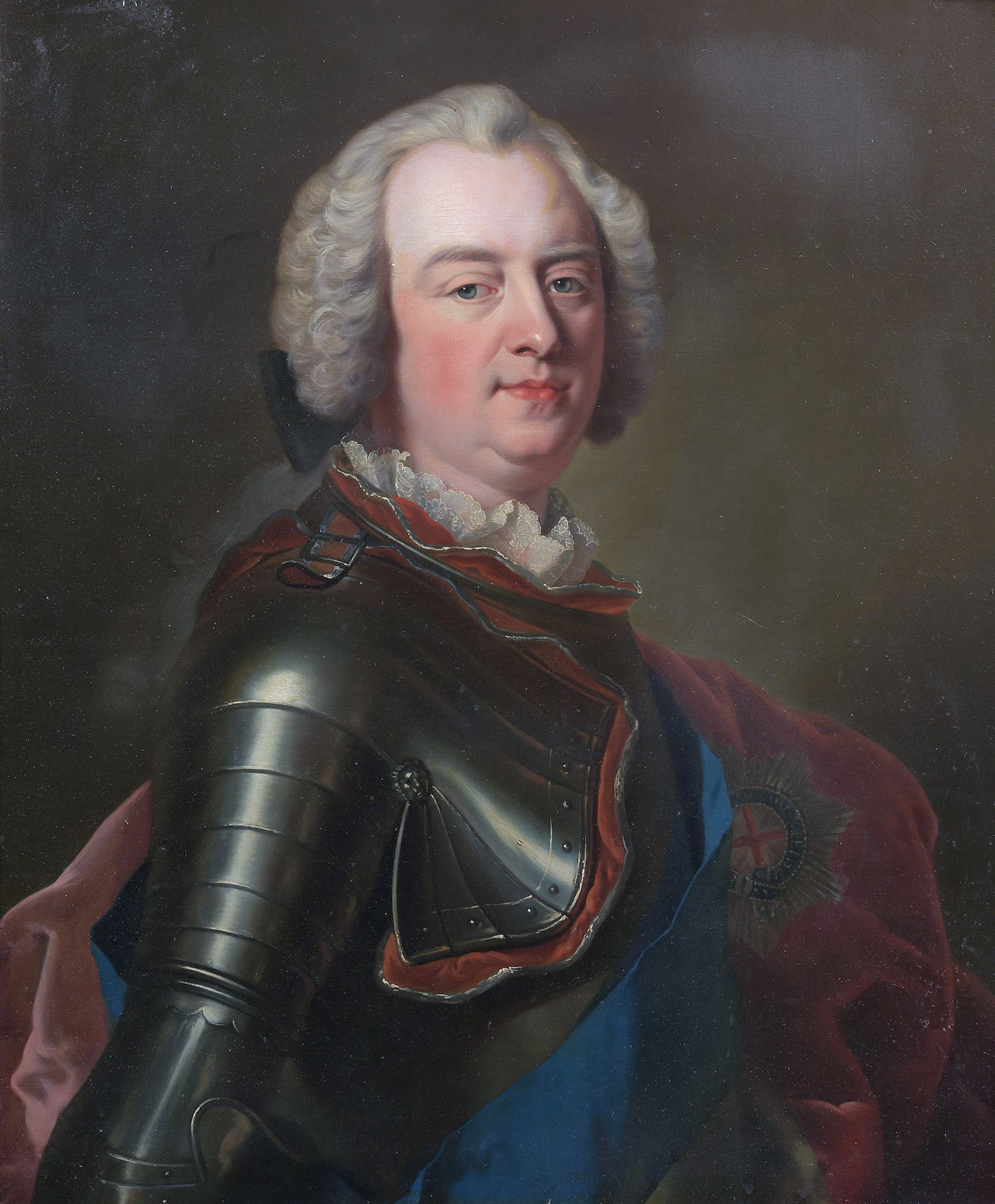
Charles Lennox, 2nd Duke of Richmond was a leading patron of early cricket.

The earliest definite reference to the sport of cricket is dated 17 January 1597 (Old Style), equating to 27 January 1598 in modern New Style dates. (Note: New Year's Day in England was 25 March until 1752, when it was moved to 1 January. The Old Style Julian calendar was also replaced by the New Style Gregorian calendar in 1752.) It is a deposition in the records of a legal case at Guildford, Surrey, regarding usage of a parcel of land. John Derrick, a coroner, testified that he had played cricket on the land when he was a boy in about 1550. Derrick's testimony is confirmation that the sport was being played by the middle of the 16th century, but its true origin is unknown. All that is known with a fair degree of certainty is that its beginning was earlier than 1550, probably somewhere in south-east England within the counties of Kent, Sussex, and Surrey. There have been suggestions that it can be traced to Flemish immigrants then resident in the area. The origin of the word cricket could derive from the Flemish word krick(-e), meaning a stick.

The sparse information available about the early years suggests that it may have been a children's game in the 16th century but, by about 1610, it had become an adult pastime. A dictionary published in 1611 describes a type of cricket bat. The earliest known match was played around that time, but fewer than thirty are recorded from then to 1725. Similarly, the names of few players, teams, and venues of the period have been recorded. The earliest matches played by English parish teams are examples of village cricket. There were no newspaper reports of matches until the end of the seventeenth century, and so the primary sources are court records and private diaries; hence games were rarely recorded.

During the reign of Charles I, the gentry took an increased interest as patrons, and occasionally as players. A big attraction for them was the opportunity that the game offered for gambling, and this escalated in the years following the Restoration when cricket in London and the south-eastern counties of England evolved into a popular social activity. The patrons staged lucrative eleven-a-side matches featuring the earliest professional players. Meanwhile, English colonists had introduced cricket to North America, and the sailors of the East India Company had taken it to the Indian subcontinent.

In the first quarter of the 18th century, more information about cricket became available as the growing newspaper industry took an interest. While impeded by poor transport links, the game was beginning to reach parts of England outside the home counties by the early 18th century. By 1725, wealthy patrons—such as Edwin Stead; Charles Lennox, 2nd Duke of Richmond; and Sir William Gage—were forming teams of county strength in Kent and Sussex. The earliest-known great players, including William Bedle and Thomas Waymark, were active. Cricket was attracting large, vociferous crowds, and the matches were social occasions at which gambling and alcoholic drinks were additional attractions.

== Origins and etymology ==
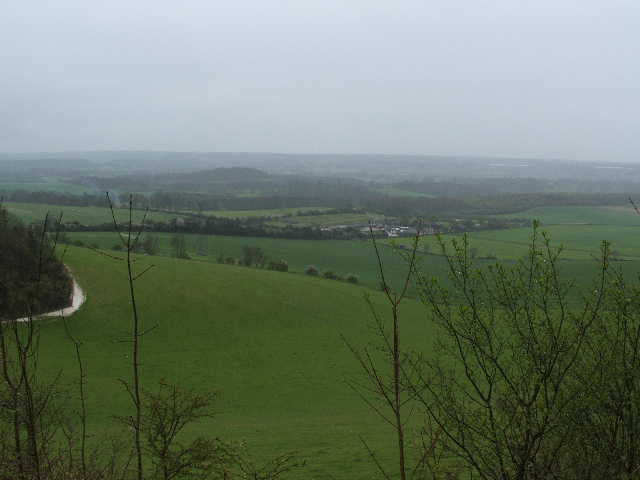
A view of the Weald, where cricket may have originated

The most widely accepted theory about the origin of cricket is that it developed in early medieval times to the south and south-east of London in the geographical areas of the North Downs, the South Downs, and the Weald. The counties of Kent, Sussex, and Surrey were therefore the sport's earliest locations, and it was from these that it reached London, where its lasting popularity was ensured, and other southern English counties like Berkshire, Essex, Hampshire, and Middlesex.

A number of words in common use in the 16th century are thought to be possible sources for cricket's name. In the earliest known reference to the sport in 1598 (N.S.), it is called creckett. Given the strong medieval trade connections between south-east England and the County of Flanders when the latter belonged to the Duchy of Burgundy, the name may have been derived from the Middle Dutch (Note: Middle Dutch was the language in use in Flanders at the time.) krick(-e), meaning a stick, or the Old English cryce, meaning a crutch, staff, or stick. In what may be an early reference to the sport, a 1533 poem attributed to John Skelton describes Flemish weavers as "kings of crekettes", a word of apparent Middle Dutch origin. In Samuel Johnson's Dictionary of the English Language (1755), he derived cricket from cryce. In Old French, the word criquet seems to have meant a kind of club or stick, though this may have been the origin of croquet. The first mention of criquet in France is in a letter of grievance to King Louis XI in October 1478, following a riot in Liettres. Another possible source is the Middle Dutch word krickstoel, meaning a long low stool used for kneeling in church, the shape of which resembled the two-stump wicket used in early cricket. According to Heiner Gillmeister, a European language expert of the University of Bonn, cricket derives from the Middle Dutch phrase for hockey, met de (krik ket)sen (i.e., "with the stick chase").

Cricket is known to have been played by children in the 16th century, and it is possible that it was, for many generations, essentially a children's game. It has been suggested that the invention of the game could have happened in Norman (1066–1154) or Plantagenet (1154–1485) times, or even in Anglo-Saxon times before the Norman Conquest in 1066. Historian David Underdown rejects speculation, however, and asserts that the only thing which can definitely be said about the origin of cricket is that its earliest record is a testimony in a late 16th-century court case, which proves it was played by children in Surrey in the middle of that century.

Despite some similarities, there is no evidence of cricket having evolved from another bat-and-ball sport and, equally, no evidence that any other bat-and-ball sport evolved from cricket. Part of the reasoning for this is that, unlike other games with batters, bowlers, and fielders—such as stoolball, rounders, and baseball—cricket can only be played on relatively short grass, especially as the ball was delivered along the ground until the 1760s, so forest clearings and land where sheep had grazed would have been suitable places to play.

Among alternative theories of origin is one by the writer Andrew Lang, who claimed in 1912 that cricket evolved from a bat-and-ball game which may have been played in Dál Riata (modern Argyll and County Antrim) as early as the 6th century, but this claim has been dismissed, by Anthony Bateman among others, in terms of "Lang's idiosyncratic belief in the Celtic origin of cricket". It is true that cricket is one of many bat-and-ball sports existing worldwide which have no known origin. Others are the Irish sport of hurling, and Scottish shinty. Golf and hockey are other British ball games involving a club or stick, while croquet was apparently imported from France and, globally, there are games such as Sweden's brännboll, Italy's lippa, India's gilli-danda, Finland's pesäpallo, and Samoa's kilikiti. There is a 1523 reference to stoolball at a designated field in Oxfordshire; this may then have been a generic term for any game in which a ball is somehow hit with a bat or stick. Eighteenth-century references to stoolball in conjunction with cricket clearly indicate that it was a separate activity.

=== "Creag" ===
On 10 March 1300 Old Style (18 March 1301 New Style), wardrobe accounts of King Edward I of England included refunds to one John de Leek of monies that he had paid out to enable Prince Edward to play "creag and other games" at both Westminster and Newenden. Prince Edward, the future Prince of Wales, was then aged 15. It has been suggested that "creag" was an early form of cricket, but most historians believe it was something quite different.

=== Earliest definite references ===
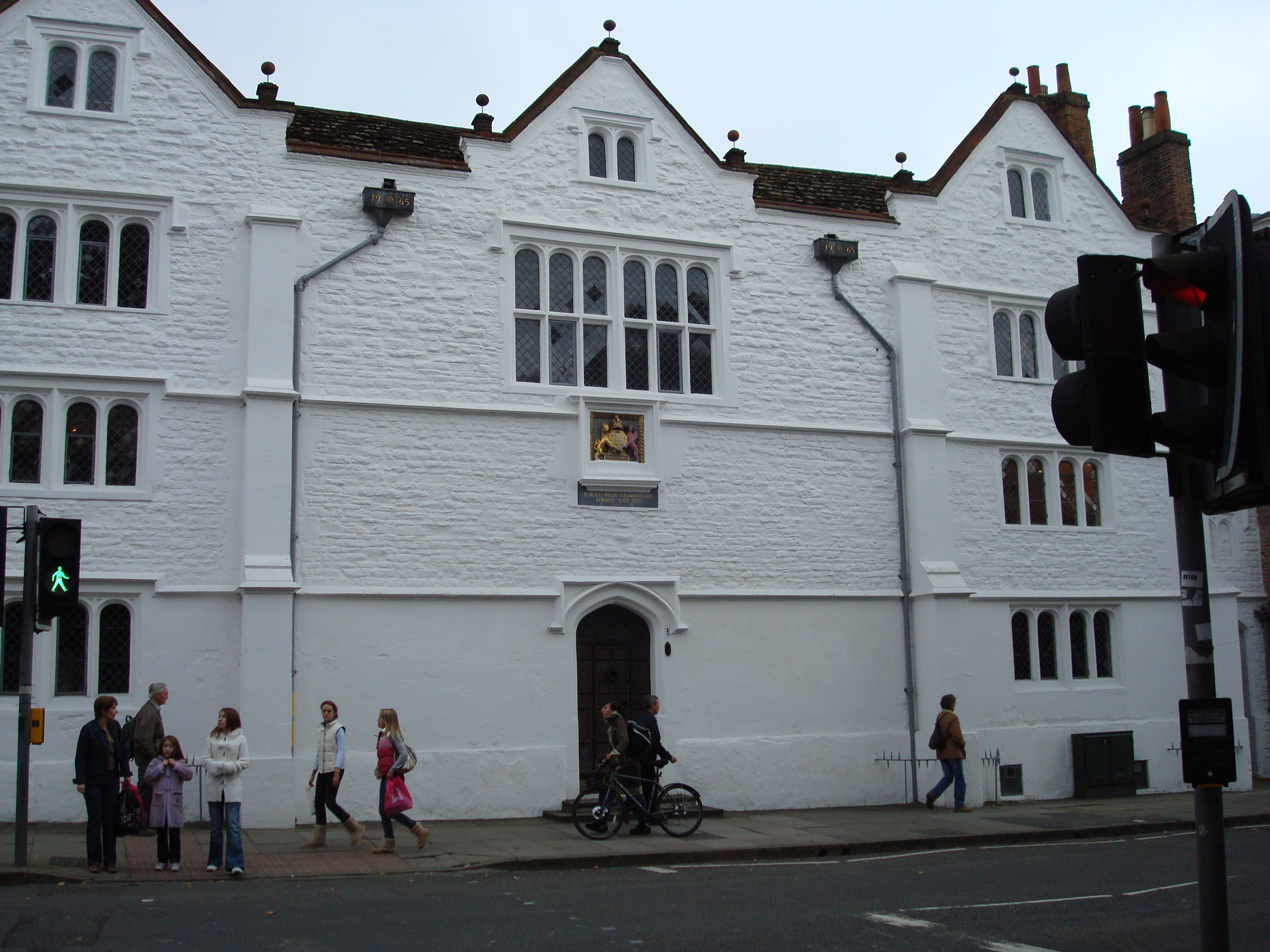
The Royal Grammar School in Guildford (pictured in 2007), where John Derrick was a pupil when he and his friends played creckett c. 1550

The earliest definite reference to cricket being played in England, its home country, is in evidence given at a 1598 legal case, concerning ownership of a parcel of land, which confirms that it was played on common land in Guildford, Surrey, around 1550. The court in Guildford heard on 17 January 1597 Old Style (27 January 1598 New Style) from a 59-year-old coroner, John Derrick, who gave witness that when he was a scholar fifty years earlier at the Free School of Guildford:

hee and diverse of his fellows did runne and play [on the common land] at creckett and other plaies

This confirmed that the sport was played there by schoolboys c. 1550. Cricket is the only one of the plaies (i.e., games) to be specifically named.

In 1598, there was a reference to cricket in an Italian-English dictionary by Giovanni Florio. His definition of the word sgillare was: "to make a noise as a cricket, to play cricket-a-wicket, and be merry". Florio is the first writer known to have defined cricket in terms of both an insect and a game. In a later edition of his dictionary in 1611, Florio infers that to play cricket-a-wicket has sexual associations with references to frittfritt, defined as cricket-a-wicket, or gigaioggie, and dibatticare, defined as "to thrum a wench lustily till the bed cry giggaioggie".

== The development of village cricket: 1610–1660 ==
=== Beginning of adult participation ===
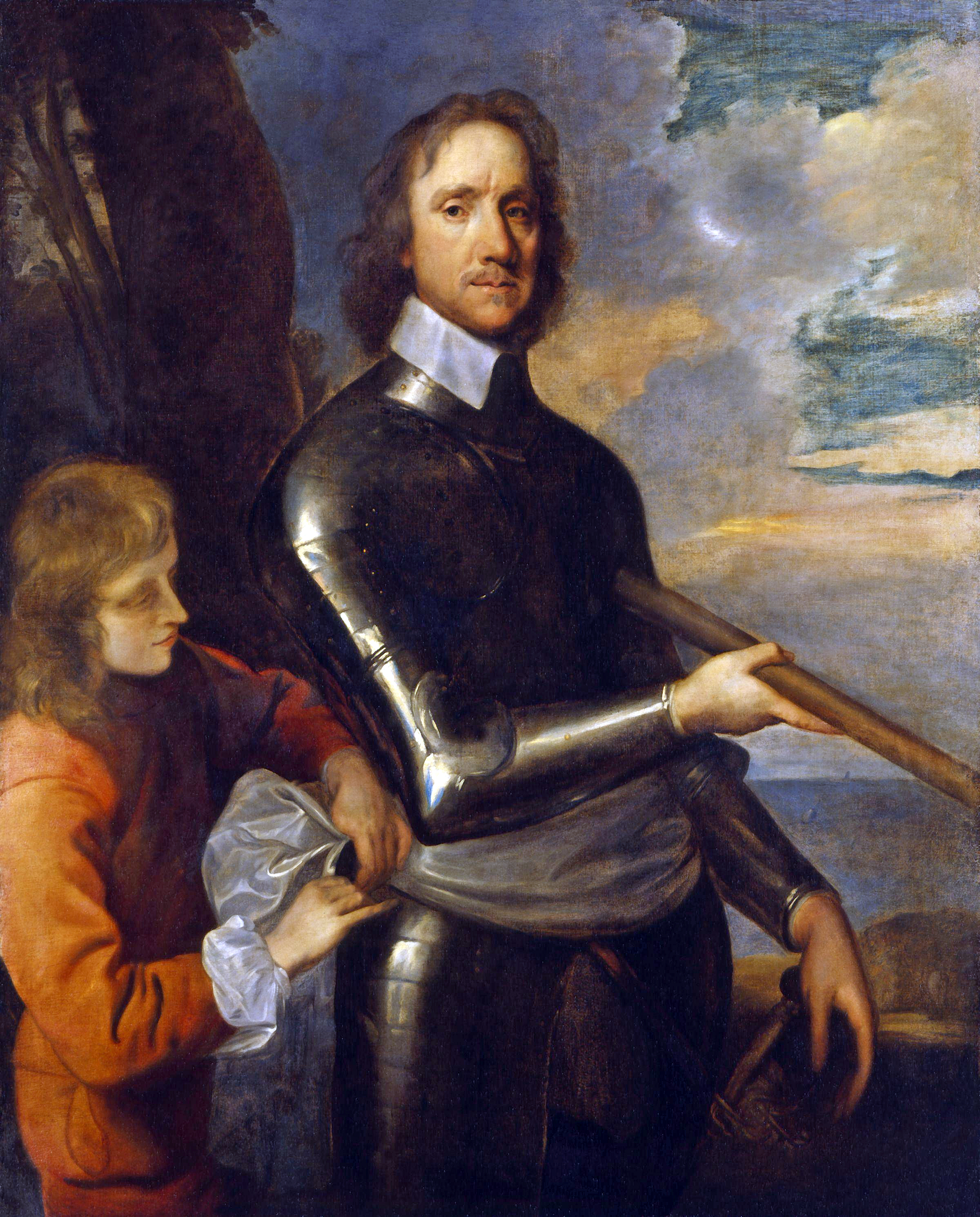
Oliver Cromwell was the subject of the earliest definite reference to cricket being played in London. Portrait by Robert Walker (1649).

The first definite mention of cricket in Kent is deduced from a 1640 court case which recorded a "cricketing" (match) of the Weald and the Upland versus the Chalk Hill at Chevening "about thirty years since" (so, around 1610). As with the 1598 reference, the case concerned the land on which the game was played. The match is the earliest on record anywhere in the world. It involved two village/parish teams, and these contests became popular in the first half of the 17th century, so the match also marks the known beginning of village cricket, which has continued to the present day.

In 1611, a French-English dictionary was published by Randle Cotgrave who defined the noun crosse as "the crooked staff wherewith boys play at cricket"; the verb form of the word is crosser, defined as "to play at cricket". Although cricket was defined as a boys' game in Cotgrave's dictionary, as per the Guildford schoolboys mentioned by Derrick, other references from this time indicate adult participation. The first is in a 1613 court case which recorded that someone was assaulted with a "cricket staffe" at Wanborough, near Guildford. In 1616, John Bullokar referred to cricket in his An English Expositor as "a kind of game with a ball". In 1617, the 18-year-old Oliver Cromwell is recorded as playing cricket and football in London. This is the earliest definite reference to cricket in London.

=== Religious issues ===
Cricket in Sussex is first definitely mentioned in 1611, when ecclesiastical court records state that two parishioners of Sidlesham, Bartholomew Wyatt and Richard Latter, had failed to attend church on Easter Sunday because they were playing cricket. They were fined 12 pence each, and made to do penance, which meant confessing their guilt to the whole church congregation the following Sunday. The Sidlesham case is the first of several 17th-century cricket references, until the Restoration in 1660, arising from Puritan disapproval of recreational activity, especially on Sundays.

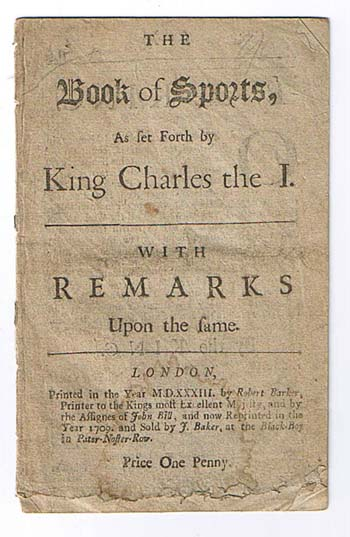
Title page of The Book of Sports (1633), which did not mention cricket

Puritan interference had become enough of a problem by 1617 for James I to issue the Declaration of Sports (also known as The Book of Sports) which listed the sports and recreations that were permitted on Sundays. Cricket is not mentioned. Initially, the declaration was effective in Lancashire only, partly as a reaction to Puritan suppression there of certain activities which were pursued by the Roman Catholic gentry. In 1618, the declaration was issued nationally, and then reissued by Charles I in 1633. Sunday amusements were strongly opposed by the Puritans.

In 1622, several parishioners of Boxgrove, near Chichester, were prosecuted for playing cricket in a churchyard on Sunday, 5 May. There were three reasons for the prosecution: one was that it contravened a local bye-law; another reflected concern about church windows which may or may not have been broken; the third was expressed as:

A little childe had like to have her braines beaten out with a cricket batt.

The latter reason was because the rules at the time allowed the batter to hit the ball twice, meaning that he could actually chase the ball after hitting it once and try to hit it again, either to score more runs or to prevent a fielder from catching it. That being so, fielding near the batter was very hazardous, as two fatalities would drastically confirm. In 1628, an ecclesiastical case related to a game at East Lavant, also near Chichester, being played on a Sunday. One of the defendants argued that he had not played during evening prayer time but only before and after. His defence was dismissed, and he was fined the statutory 12 pence and ordered to do penance. There are three further references before the Civil War. In a 1636 court case concerning a tithe dispute, a witness called Henry Mabbinck testified that he played cricket "in the Parke" at West Horsley in Surrey. Another ecclesiastical case recorded parishioners of Midhurst, Sussex, playing cricket during evening prayer on 26 February 1637 Old Style (8 March 1638 New Style). In 1640, Puritan clerics at both Maidstone and Harbledown, near Canterbury, denounced cricket as "profane", especially if played on Sunday.

When the Civil War began in 1642, the Long Parliament banned theatres, which had met with Puritan disapproval. For the same reason, sanctions were issued against other recreational activities, including certain sports, and the Declaration of Sports manuscript was publicly burned by order of the Puritan Parliament in 1643. Except that it must not be played on Sundays, references to cricket before and during the Commonwealth suggest that it was otherwise approved. Oliver Cromwell, now Lord Protector of the Commonwealth, had himself been a player as a young man.

In 1654, three men were prosecuted at Eltham in Kent for playing cricket on a Sunday. As the Puritans were now firmly in power, Cromwell's Protectorate having been established the previous year, the penalty was doubled to 24 pence (two shillings). The defendants were charged with "breaking the Sabbath", not with playing cricket. Similarly, when Cromwell's commissioners banned sport in Ireland two years later on the grounds of "unlawful assembly", there is no evidence that the ban included cricket, which may not have reached Ireland by that time – according to cricket historian and writer Rowland Bowen, the earliest-known match in Ireland was in 1792.

Puritan prejudice did not survive the Restoration. In 1671, a man called Edward Bound was charged with playing cricket on the Sabbath, and was exonerated: evidence that attitudes had changed.

=== Fatalities ===
In 1624, a fatality occurred following a match on 28 August Old Style (7 September New Style), at Horsted Keynes in Sussex. A fielder called Jasper Vinall was struck on the head by the batter, Edward Tye, who was trying to hit the ball a second time to avoid being caught. Vinall, who died thirteen days later at home in West Hoathly, is thus the earliest recorded cricketing fatality. The matter was recorded in a coroner's court, which returned a verdict of death by misadventure. The record of the 1624 case confirms that two villages, Horsted Keynes and West Hoathly, were involved in the match, providing further evidence of the growth of village cricket. A further fatality, under identical circumstances, occurred in 1647 at Selsey, now in West Sussex, when a player called Henry Brand was hit on the head by a batter trying to hit the ball a second time. (Note: When the first Laws of Cricket were encoded in 1744, hitting the ball twice was banned, and a batter breaking the rule was to be given out.)

== The beginning of amateur cricket ==
The beginnings of cricket's social division between amateurs and professionals, from which the annual Gentlemen v Players contest ultimately evolved, can be traced to the reign of Charles I. In 1629, Henry Cuffin, a curate at Ruckinge in Kent, was prosecuted by an archdeacon's court for playing cricket on Sunday evening after prayers. He claimed that several of his fellow players were "persons of repute and fashion". This statement is the first evidence of cricket achieving popularity among the gentry.

It was the gentry who introduced large-scale gambling into cricket, and some of these gamblers subsequently became patrons by forming select teams that would improve their chances of winning. During the Commonwealth, gambling was, of political necessity, low key. The earliest reference to gambling on a cricket match is in the records of a 1646 court case concerning non-payment of a wager that was made on a game at Coxheath Common in Kent that year. Incongruously, given the huge sums of money staked later in the century, this wager was for twelve candles. The match is the earliest known example of an "odds" game as two Coxheath players were against four Maidstone players; the Coxheath two won. It was possibly a single wicket match and, if that could be proved, it would be the earliest on record. As in the 1629 case, the six players were gentry. In 1652, a case at Cranbrook against John Rabson, Esq. and others referred to "a certain unlawful game called cricket" – as far as is known, it was only "unlawful" if played on a Sunday. Rabson was evidently a member of the gentry, but most of the other defendants were working-class.

Cricket has long been recognised as a sport that bridged the class divide but, in time, the cricketing gentlemen came to be called "amateurs" to emphasise the distinction between themselves and the professionals who belonged to the lower social classes, mostly to the working class. The amateur became not merely someone who played cricket in his spare time but a particular type of top class cricketer who existed officially until 1962, when the distinction between amateur and professional was abolished, and all players became nominally professional thereafter. In terms of remuneration, amateurs claimed expenses for playing while professionals were paid a salary or fee. Amateur cricket was an extension of the game played in schools, universities, and other centres of education, both as a curricular and extracurricular activity; schools and universities formed the "production line" that created nearly all the noted amateur players.

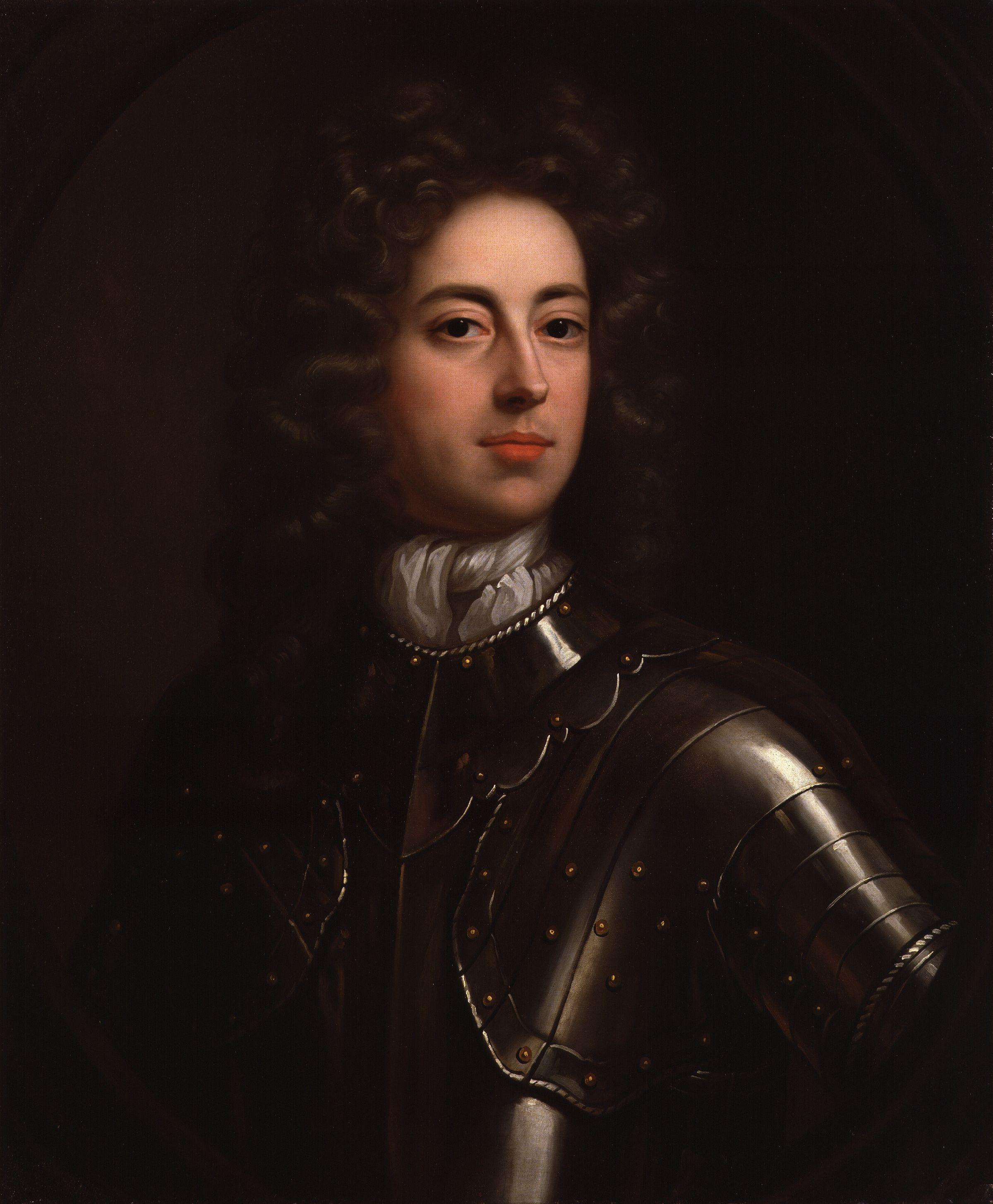
John Churchill, 1st Duke of Marlborough, as a young man; he played cricket at school in the 1660s.

There are few 17th-century references to cricket being played at or in the vicinity of schools but, in 1647, a Latin poem contains a probable reference to cricket being played at Winchester College; if so, it is the earliest known mention of cricket in Hampshire. There is a reference to the game at St Paul's School, London c. 1665 concerning John Churchill, 1st Duke of Marlborough, who studied there. In his Social History of English Cricket, historian Derek Birley comments that school cricket was "alive and well during the interregnum" (1649–1660). He speculates that the game "must have been known to every schoolboy in the south-east" of England. He doubts, however, that the sport at this time was part of any school's curriculum. Apart from Eton College and Westminster School, all schools in the 17th century had local intakes and no class segregation. Therefore, the sons of rich and poor families played together.

The earliest reference to cricket at the University of Oxford, and in the county of Oxfordshire, is in John Phillips' Duellum Musicum, a 1673 pamphlet concerning music tuition. In this, there is a criticism of his rival Thomas Salmon, who had boasted of being a graduate of Trinity College, Oxford: "He shews but a slender sign of his University-Education: Where he seems to have spent his time rather in the more laudable Exercises of Trap and Cricket, than in any sound Reading".

Depending on when Salmon graduated, it would seem that cricket was a normal activity at Oxford for some time before Phillips wrote his pamphlet. (Note: Cricket was certainly well-established at Oxford by October 1728, when the 19-year-old Samuel Johnson entered Pembroke College. He told James Boswell that cricket matches were played during the one year he was at Oxford, and this was recorded by Boswell in his Life of Samuel Johnson.)

A comment by Horace Walpole confirms that cricket was being played at Eton College during the first quarter of the 18th century. The earliest reference to cricket being played at the University of Cambridge is dated 1710. The earliest-known description of a cricket match is by William Goldwin, a former student at both Eton and Cambridge. In 1706, he wrote a Latin poem of 95 lines on a rural match entitled In Certamen Pilae (On a Ball Game), which was published in his Musae Juveniles (Youthful Muses).

== Development of cricket from 1660 to 1700 ==
In what Birley calls "the great upsurge of sport after the Restoration", the nobility adopted cricket as one of their main sports along with horse racing and prizefighting. Under their patronage, the first teams representing several parishes, and even whole counties, were formed in the 1660s; the period saw the first "great matches" as cricket evolved into a major sport. One significant aspect of this evolution was the introduction of professionalism as the nobility returned to London from their country estates. They were keen to develop cricket, and brought with them some of the "local experts" from village cricket, whom they now employed as professional players.

It was during the second half of the 17th century that, as cricket historian Roy Webber put it, "the game took a real grip", especially in the south-eastern counties of England. According to Bowen, "it is likely that the Restoration was the crucial factor in leading to the social acceptance of the game". Although there are only scattered references to the game in the time of Charles II, it is clear that its popularity was increasing. The shortage of references is due to the Licensing of the Press Act 1662, which imposed stringent controls on the newspaper industry, and sports – including cricket – were not reported. The few surviving references have been found in official records, such as court cases, or in private letters and diaries.

Cricket historian Harry Altham asserted that, within a year or two of the Restoration, "it became the thing in London society to make matches and form clubs". He claimed that a kind of "feudal patronage" was established as the nobility took control of the sport, their interest fuelled by the opportunities for gambling that it provided, and this set the pattern for cricket's development through the next century. These claims by Altham are challenged by writer and former politician John Major, who wrote that he could find no evidence at all of matches in London before the 1700s, and no mention of any club prior to 1722.

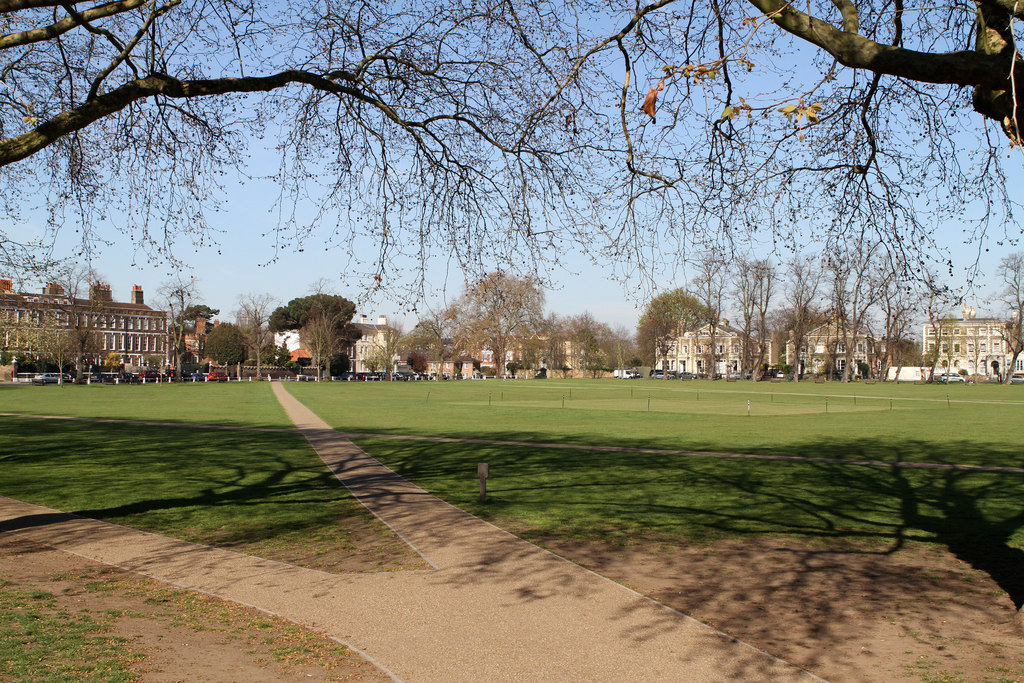
Richmond Green cricket field in 2012

The Gaming Act 1664 was passed by the Cavalier Parliament to try to curb some of the post-Restoration excesses, including gambling on cricket, and it limited stakes to £100 (equivalent to £17,820 in 2025). It is known that, by 1697, a cricket match could attract stakes of 50 guineas (equivalent to £8,328 in 2025), and it was funded by gambling throughout the next century.

In May 1666, Sir Robert Paston, a resident of Richmond, wrote a letter to his wife, in which he mentioned that their son had taken part in "a game of criquett (sic) on Richmond Green", the first reference to cricket there.

There was a far-reaching development at Maidstone in 1668 when the quarter sessions made a ruling that customs and excise could not claim excise duty on alcoholic drinks sold at a "kricketing"; it was further ruled that a match promoter had the right to sell ale to spectators, presumably after obtaining the necessary licence. As Major suggested, this dealt a massive blow to "Puritan morality", and it could have been the beginning of the long-term relationship between sport and alcohol. Birley's comment on the excise ruling was that cricket's "connection with public houses is historic in every sense of the word". In his view, the sport had "arrived" because the brewery trade was the earliest and strongest sponsor of popular sport.

In 1677, accounts of Thomas Lennard, 1st Earl of Sussex, include an item which refers to £3 being paid to him when he attended a cricket match being played at "ye Dicker", which was a common near Herstmonceux in East Sussex. In 1678, there was mention of cricket as "a play" (presumably in the sense of a sport that is played) in a Latin dictionary published by Dr Adam Littleton. In 1694, accounts of Sir John Pelham record 2s 6d paid for a wager concerning a cricket match in Lewes (at an unspecified venue).

In 1695, Parliament decided against a renewal of the Licensing of the Press Act 1662, and so cleared the way for a free press on the Act's expiry in 1696. Censorship had already been relaxed following the Bill of Rights 1689. Freedom of the press made it possible for sporting events to be reported, but it would be a very long time before the newspaper industry adapted sufficiently to provide frequent, let alone comprehensive, reports. As Major says, however, although early reports were sparse, trivia tended to "make good copy", and large wagers between rival patrons were given coverage.

The earliest known newspaper report of a "great match" was in the Foreign Post dated Wednesday, 7 July 1697 Old Style (17 July 1697 New Style):

The middle of last week a great match at cricket was played in Sussex; there were eleven of a side, and they played for fifty guineas apiece.

The match has been recorded by more than one source, starting with cricket historian G. B. Buckley, who said it is the earliest record of an eleven-a-side match. The stakes on offer confirm the importance of the fixture, and the fact that it was eleven-a-side suggests that two strong, well-balanced teams were assembled.

Periodicals called The Post Boy and The Post Man were in circulation during the early 18th century. A series of ten-a-side matches to be held on Clapham Common, near Vauxhall, was pre-announced by The Post Boy. The first was to take place on Easter Monday, 1 April 1700 Old Style (12 April 1700 New Style), and prizes of £10 and £20 were at stake. No match reports have survived. so the results and scores remain unknown. The advert says the teams would consist of ten "Gentlemen" per side but the invitation to attend was to "Gentlemen and others". This clearly implies that cricket had acquired both the patronage that underwrote it through the 18th century, and the spectators who demonstrated its lasting popular appeal. It is the earliest-known match in the county of Surrey.

== Rules and equipment of early cricket ==
Early cricketers played in their everyday clothes, and had no protective equipment such as batting gloves or pads. Cricket as played in the first half of the 18th century is the subject of a 1743 painting (Note: The painting is Francis Hayman's Cricket as played at the Artillery Ground, 1743. It hangs in the Lord's Pavilion.) of a game in progress. It depicts two batsmen and a bowler dressed alike in white shirt, breeches, white knee-length stockings, and shoes with buckles. The wicket-keeper wears the same clothes with the addition of a waistcoat, and does not wear wicket-keeper's gloves. An umpire and Scorer wear three-quarter length coats and tricorn hats. Apart from the shirts and stockings, none of the clothes are white, as they would normally be in modern cricket.

The ball was bowled underarm along the ground, as in bowls, at varying speed towards a wicket consisting of two stumps mounted by a single crosspiece. The batsman addressed the delivery with a bat that resembled a modern hockey stick, this shape being ideal for dealing with a ball on the ground. (Note: The modern straight bat is said to have evolved in the 1760s, after the introduction of the pitched delivery.)

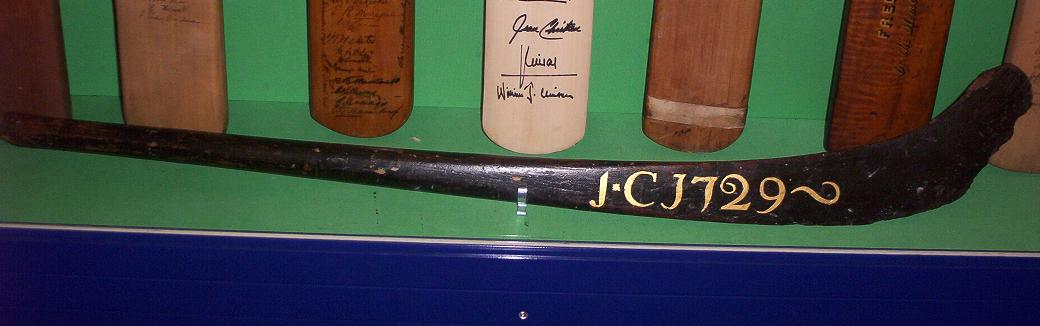
The oldest cricket bat still in existence dates from 1729. The shape is more like that of a modern-day hockey stick than a modern-day cricket bat. It is kept in the Sandham Room in the Member's Pavilion at The Oval.

The record of the 1622 case at Boxgrove contains the earliest reference to the cricket bat. The term "batt" in cricket was peculiar to Kent and Sussex, where coastal smugglers were known as "batmen" because of the cudgels they carried. The earliest reference to a "flat-faced" bat also occurs in 1622. The term "bat" remained comparatively rare until about 1720, with the terms "staff", "stave" or "stick" being more prevalent. These tended to have regional usage: for example, "stave" was used in the Gloucester area, and "batt" in the south-east; while "staff" and, especially, "stick" were more widely used. (Note: "Bat" is derived from the French battledore, shaped like a table tennis bat, which was used by washerwomen to beat their washing with. See Oxford English Dictionary – battledore.)

The earliest reference to the cricket ball is found in 1658 in Mysteries of Love and Eloquence by Edward Phillips. The pitch has been 22 yards long (i.e., a chain) since the first known code of Laws in 1744, and it is believed this length had been in use since the introduction of Gunter's chain in 1620. The over consisted of four deliveries until the 19th century.

The earliest known reference to the wicket is contained in lines written in an old bible in 1680 which invited, "All you that do delight in Cricket, come to Marden, pitch your wickets". Marden is in West Sussex, north of Chichester, and close to Hambledon, which is just across the county boundary in Hampshire. The wicket until the 1770s comprised two stumps and a single bail. By that time, the shape of the wicket was high and narrow after the 1744 Laws defined the dimensions as 22 inches high and six inches wide. Earlier 18th century pictures, however, show a wicket that was low and broad, perhaps two feet wide by one foot high. The ends of the stumps were forked to support the light bail, and there were criteria for the firmness of pitching the stumps into the ground, and for the delicate placing of the bail, so that it would easily topple when a stump was hit.

While the actual origin of the wicket is unknown, its outline shape in the first quarter of the 18th century resembles the profile of a church stool, which is low and broad. Furthermore, the legs of the stool were called stumps, which adds further credence to the idea that stools were used as early wickets. According to the Churchwarden's Accounts for Great St. Mary's Church of Cambridge (1504–1635), a church stool was sometimes known in the south-east by the Dutch name of "kreckett", this being the same word used for the game by Derrick in 1598.

The earliest known mention of the umpire dates from a match in Middlesex in 1680; this constitutes the first mention of cricket in the county, and is the first entry in Buckley's Fresh Light on 18th Century Cricket. Buckley does not quote the reference "that is quite unfit for publication nowadays", but he confirms a clear reference to "the two umpires", and that the double wicket form of the game was already well known in London. In early cricket, there were two umpires as now, one standing behind the wicket at the bowler's end of the pitch, the other close to the striker's wicket. Both umpires carried a bat which the running batsman was required to touch in order to complete his run. There were two Scorers who sat on the grass, several yards from the striker, and recorded the scores by making notches on tallysticks; runs were then known as notches for this reason.

There were two main forms of cricket in the 17th and 18th centuries. One was single wicket in which, as the name implies, there is only one batsman, although teams of threes or fives usually took part. The converse is the "double wicket" form, with two batsmen, which has long been associated with eleven-a-side teams playing two innings each – it is these games which, depending on the teams involved, are usually considered historically important. Although single wicket is known to have been popular during this period, the earliest definite record of a single wicket match is in 1726.

== English cricket in the early 18th century ==
=== Patrons ===
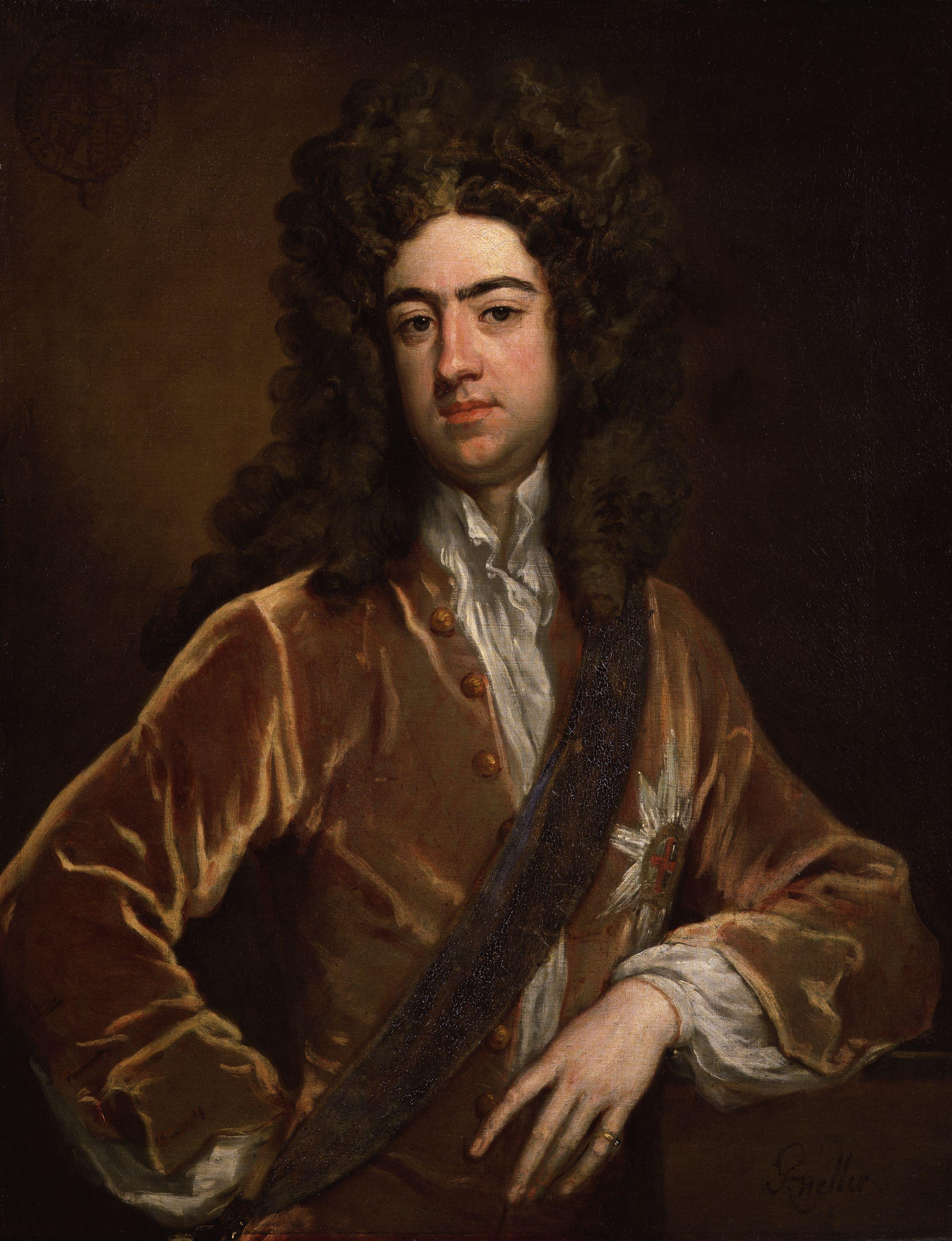
Charles Lennox, 1st Duke of Richmond

On an unknown date in 1702, the 1st Duke of Richmond's XI (Note: It is normal to have eleven players in a cricket team, and many ad hoc units were termed an "XI" after the name of the patron. The 1st Duke of Richmond's XI is the earliest team known to have been named in this way. See also List of occasional English cricket XIs.) played against an Arundel team at an unspecified venue in Sussex. The source for this game is a receipt sent by one Saul Bradley to the Duke on Monday, 14 December 1702 Old Style (25 December 1702 New Style). The receipt was for one shilling and six pence paid by the Duke "for brandy when your Grace plaid at Cricket with Arundel men". The venue was probably either Goodwood, where Richmond had his estate, or Arundel, possibly on Bury Hill, which was used for cricket in later years. Arundel was the first cricket club to be founded in Sussex, and remained one of the "stronger towns" through the 18th century.

After the 1st Duke of Richmond died in 1723, his son Charles Lennox, 2nd Duke of Richmond, quickly succeeded him as cricket's main benefactor, becoming a famous patron of Sussex cricket for the next thirty years. The 2nd Duke enjoyed a friendly rivalry with Sir William Gage, another Sussex patron. Their teams played each other many times, and their earliest known contest was in July 1725, five days after Sir William's team was beaten by unknown opponents.

Richmond had written to Gage in early July 1725 to issue a challenge for a match to be played at Goodwood. Gage replied by letter to confirm that his team would play the Duke's later in the month, and stated that he was "in great affliction from being shamefully beaten yesterday the first match I played ys (sic) year", going on to wish the Duke success in everything except his cricket match. Their game was actually played at Bury Hill, and Richmond's team won by "above forty (runs)". A report in the Daily Journal newspaper confirms Bury Hill (then called Berry Hill) as the venue. The match, played before "a vast Concourse of People", was hosted by Thomas Howard, 8th Duke of Norfolk who gave a ball at Arundel Castle in the evening.

The main rival to Richmond and Gage was Edwin Stead of Maidstone, who was the first of the noted Kent patrons. The Sussex of Richmond and Gage enjoyed what seems to have been cricket's first inter-county rivalry with Stead's Kent, although it amounted to little more than "bragging rights" as the patrons were primarily concerned with winning their wagers.

=== Gambling ===
The patrons ensured that cricket was financed in the 18th century but their interest, equally applicable to horse racing and prizefighting, was based on the opportunities that cricket provided for gambling. Every important match in the 18th century, whether eleven-a-side or single wicket, was played for stakes. The early newspapers recognised this, and were more interested in publishing the odds than the match scores. Reports would say who won the wager rather than who won the match.

Sometimes, gambling would lead to dispute, and two matches ended up in court when rival interests sought legal rulings on the terms of their wagers. In September 1718, a game on White Conduit Fields in Islington between London and the Rochester Punch Club was unfinished because three Rochester players "made an elopement" in an attempt to have the game declared incomplete, so that they would retain their stake money. London was clearly winning at the time. The London players sued for their winnings, and the game was the subject of a noted lawsuit in which the terms of the wager were at issue. The court ordered that the match must be "played out" (to a finish), and this happened in early July 1719 (the exact date is uncertain, but it was before the 4th). Rochester, with four not out batsmen, needed thirty more runs to win, but they scored only nine before they were all out. London's 21-run victory is the earliest-known definite result of any cricket match. The match is also the earliest known mention of White Conduit Fields as a venue.

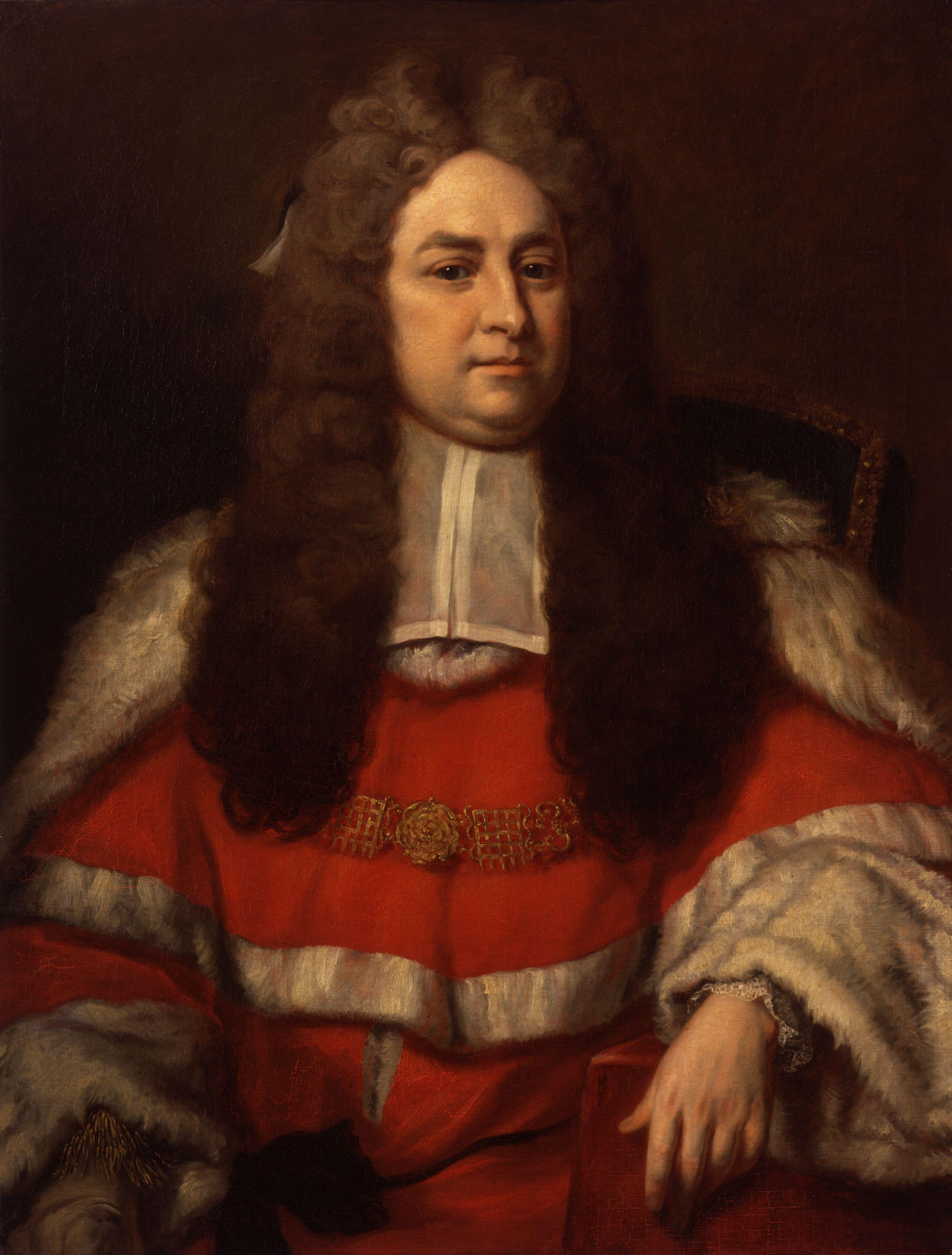
Lord Chief Justice Pratt (painted by Michael Dahl)

In 1724 (exact date unknown), a match between Edwin Stead's XI and a team from Chingford ended early because the Chingford team refused to play to a finish when Stead's team held the advantage. Another court case followed, presided over by Lord Chief Justice Pratt, who ordered them, as in the London versus Rochester match in 1718, to play it out to a finish so that all wagers could be fulfilled. Pratt "referr"d the said Cause back to Dartford Heath, to be played on where they left off, and a Rule of Court was made accordingly". The game was completed in 1726, but the final result is not on record, and there is no confirmation that Stead's team held their advantage and won.

It was about this time that the introduction of articles of agreement, agreed before matches by the stakeholders, largely resolved these problems between patrons and match organisers. The concept was more important in terms of defining the rules of play, and these were eventually codified as the Laws of Cricket.

=== 1701 to 1720 ===
In August 1705, The Post Man announced West of Kent versus Chatham, an 11-a-side game to be played in Kent. The primary source gave the venue as "Maulden", which almost certainly refers to Town Malling. There were several matches throughout the 18th century involving teams called West Kent and East Kent. Chatham was a prominent centre of cricket in the 18th century.

There was a London versus Mitcham match in 1707 at Lamb's Conduit Field, Holborn; the result is unknown. This is the earliest known important match in Middlesex, and possibly the earliest known to involve the original London Cricket Club, although the date of the club's formation is uncertain, and the team here might have been an ad hoc one. In a similar vein to the "all England" term used later in the century, the source calls this team "all London". The Mitcham team may have represented the extant Mitcham Cricket Club, which has a claimed foundation date of 1685.

Croydon played London twice in July 1707: the first game was in Croydon, probably at Duppas Hill, and the second at Lamb's Conduit Field. Both matches were advertised by The Post Man as "two great matches at cricket (to be) plaid, between London and Croydon". No post-match reports have survived, so the results and scores are unknown. The match in Croydon is the earliest known important match in Surrey.

In 1708, a local match took place somewhere in the Canterbury area, and was recorded in the diary of one Thomas Minter, a Canterbury resident, who wrote: "We beat Ash Street at Crickets (sic)".

The earliest-known match that definitely involved teams using the names of counties was Kent versus Surrey at Dartford Brent on Wednesday, 29 June 1709 Old Style (10 July 1709 New Style). This was advertised in the Post Man the previous Saturday, and played for a stake of £50. From this time, there are references to traditional counties in use as team names, although it is generally believed that the earliest "inter-county matches" were really inter-parish matches involving two villages on either side of a county boundary. Dartford was an important club in the first half of the 18th century, and the 1709 match is the earliest known mention of Dartford Brent as a venue.

William Bedle, of Dartford, the earliest great player whose name has been recorded, was reckoned to be "the most expert player in England", and must have been in his prime c. 1700 to c. 1725. Other good players known to have been active in the 1720s were Edwin Stead of Kent; Edmund Chapman and Stephen Dingate of Surrey; Tim Coleman of London; and Thomas Waymark of Sussex. Another of the very few players to be named in contemporary sources was William Goodwin of Sunbury Cricket Club, which had a noted team in the 1720s and 1730s. Goodwin's skill received comment in a 1724 newspaper report, which described him as "able to play at Cricket with most People".

On Friday, 31 May 1717 Old Style (11 June 1717 New Style), Thomas Marchant, a farmer from Hurstpierpoint in Sussex, first mentioned cricket in his diary. He made numerous references to the game, particularly concerning his local club, until 1727. His son, Will, played for "our parish", as he often called the Hurstpierpoint team. In total, his diaries mention 21 village matches, and the entries provide evidence of the widespread popularity of cricket in Sussex. (Note: It is from the 1717 season that a continuous history of English cricket by season is possible. Records of cricket have survived from every season after 1716, although the details in most seasons through the 18th century remain sparse.)

=== Dartford–London rivalry ===
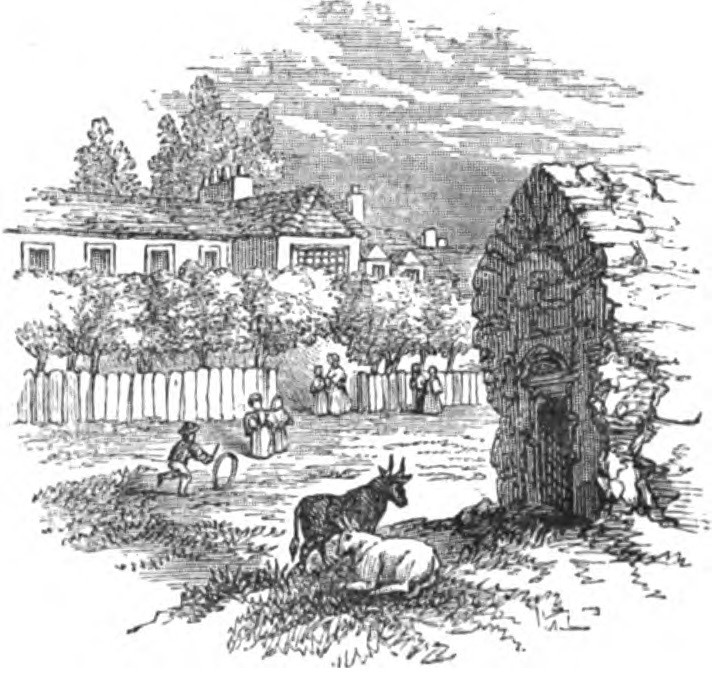
White Conduit House, just south of White Conduit Fields

The first great rivalry in cricket history was between the Dartford and London clubs, whose earliest-known match was in 1722. London played some matches against Kent, but the county side is believed to have largely consisted of Dartford players. In August 1719, London versus Kent was played at White Conduit Fields, with Kent victorious. The report said the teams played for "a considerable sum of money". A contemporary report concludes with: "The Kentish men won the wager".

In July 1720, London defeated Kent at White Conduit Fields, but the match was marred by two London fielders being badly injured, following a clash of heads while chasing the ball. Cricket historian H. T. Waghorn noted a lull in the advertising and reporting of cricket after this game, and he wondered if that was due to a perception of the sport as dangerous. If there was a lapse in cricket at this time, the more likely causes would be either the South Sea Bubble, which ruined many investors after the South Sea Company was found to be insolvent, and so could have reduced cricket patronage, or the Stamp Act 1712, which applied stamp duty to newspapers, and so increased their publication costs. This in turn caused publishers to reduce paper size with limited space for content, including the advertising and reporting of matches.

A disrupted match between London and Dartford was the subject of a letter in The Weekly Journal dated Saturday, 21 July 1722 Old Style (1 August 1722 New Style). It is believed the match took place somewhere in the Islington area, so the exact venue may have been White Conduit Fields, but the match was abandoned following a dispute. The letter said: "A Match at Cricket was made between the little Parish of Dartford in Kent, and the Gentlemen known by the name of the London Club".

Dartford and London met at Dartford Brent in June 1724 and, soon afterwards, a return game was the earliest known match at Kennington Common, near where The Oval is now sited; the results of both matches are unknown.

=== Other events in the 1720s ===
In July 1720, Kingston versus Richmond was played at an unknown venue, with Kingston victorious.

There is no evidence of any club being founded before 1722, although it has been claimed by Mitcham Cricket Club, whose home is Mitcham Cricket Green, that it was formed in 1685. Croydon, Dartford, and London may all have been founded by the 1720s, but no dates of origin have been found, although there was an actual reference to a "London Club" in a letter to The Weekly Journal (London) dated 21 July 1722 Old Style (1 August 1722 New Style). Major could find no evidence for any club prior to 1722; he mentions Mitcham as one of several localities in which impromptu games were thriving on common land. The others were Chelsea, Kennington, Clapham, Walworth, and the Weald.

In 1723, the prominent Tory politician Robert Harley, Earl of Oxford recorded in his journal: "At Dartford upon the Heath as we came out of the town, the men of Tonbridge and the Dartford men were warmly engaged at the sport of cricket, which of all the people of England the Kentish folk are the most renowned for, and of all the Kentish men, the men of Dartford lay claim to the greatest excellence". It is more than likely to have been Dartford Brent where this game was taking place.

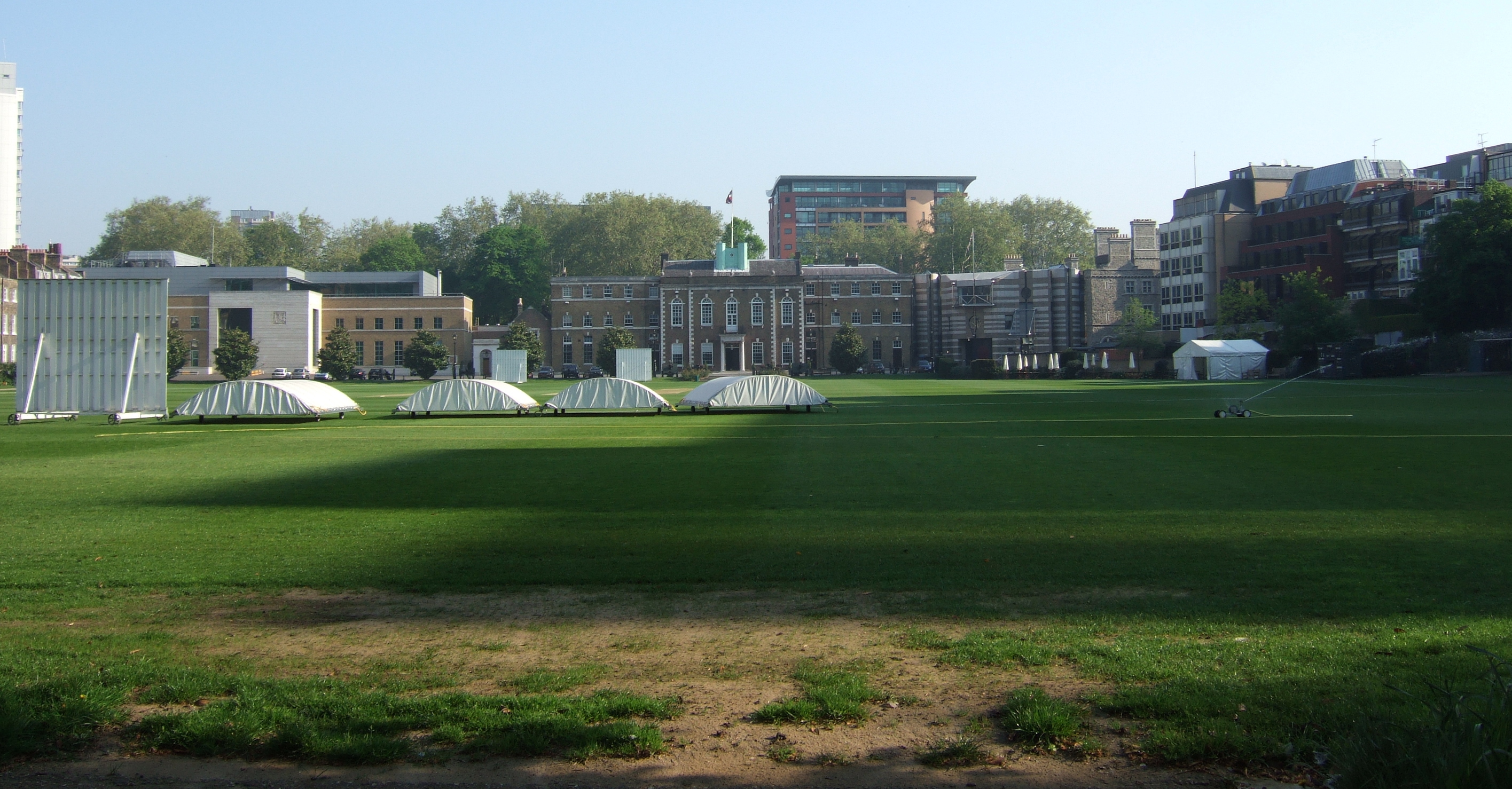
The Artillery Ground, photographed in 2008

Surrey versus London was played at Moulsey Hurst on an unknown date in 1723, the result unknown. It is the earliest known mention of Moulsey Hurst as a venue for cricket.

In August 1724, there was a match at Penshurst Park (result unknown) which featured the combined parishes of Penshurst, Tonbridge & Wadhurst versus Dartford. This was recorded in a diary entry by one John Dawson, who may have watched it; no details are known but Dawson says it was "a great cricket match".

The London club was to become chiefly associated with the Artillery Ground in Finsbury. Cricket was first mentioned at this venue on 7 May 1725 Old Style (18 May 1725 New Style), when the minutes of the Honourable Artillery Company refer to it being played there, in a note concerning "the abuse done to the herbage of the ground by the cricket players". The Artillery Ground became the feature venue for matches in the mid-18th century.

=== Geographical spread and transport issues ===
Having begun in the south-eastern counties, cricket is known to have reached Cambridgeshire, Hampshire, and Oxfordshire by 1725, but it was still essentially a Home Counties sport. Its spread into the western and northern counties of England – and into Ireland, Scotland, and Wales – was slow, and it was not recorded in Lancashire, for example, until 1781. The problem was road travel, which was both slow and dangerous with inadequate transport. In fact, long journeys tended to be waterborne, using coastal or river vessels. There were signs of improvement in road travel, however, especially after Parliament established the first turnpike trusts in 1707.

== The spread of cricket overseas ==
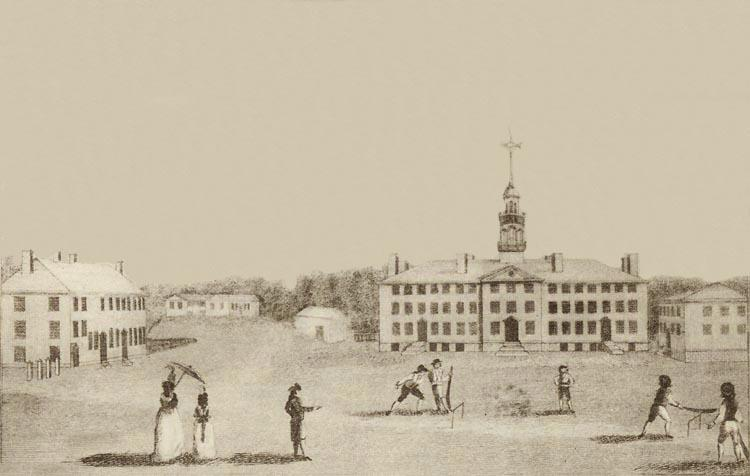
A 1793 American depiction of "wicket" being played in front of Dartmouth College. Wicket likely came to North America in the late 17th century.

While Britain's poor roads inhibited the expansion of cricket at home, the country's seafaring and trading concerns ensured its spread overseas. The earliest known mention of cricket being played outside England is dated Saturday, 6 May 1676 Old Style (16 May 1676 New Style). A diarist called Henry Tonge, who was part of a British mission at Aleppo in the Ottoman Empire, recorded that "at least forty of the English" left the city for recreational purposes and, having found a nice place to pitch a tent for dinner, they "had several pastimes and sports" including "krickett". At six they "returned home in good order".

The first definite references to cricket in India and North America date from the early 18th century. In 1709, cricket was played by William Byrd of Westover on his James River estates in the Colony of Virginia. This is the earliest reference to cricket being played in the New World.

In 1721, British sailors of the East India Company were reported to be playing cricket at Cambay, near Baroda, and this is the earliest reference to cricket being played in the Indian sub-continent. One of the players wrote: "When my boat was lying for a fortnight in one of the channels, though the country was inhabited by the Culeys, we every day diverted ourselves with playing Cricket and to other Exercises, which they would come and be spectators of".

== Known matches (c. 1610 to 1725) ==
The table below is fully chronological. It summarises the known matches – whether organised or ad hoc – from c. 1610 to 1725, and does not separate them by form or status. The earliest-known single wicket match was played in 1726, but the form is believed to be much older.

Year	Match title	Venue	Result	Ref.
c. 1610	Weald and Upland v Chalkhill	Chevening	unknown	
1624	Horsted Keynes v West Hoathly	Horsted Keynes	unknown	
1697	"A Great Match"	Sussex	unknown	
1700	Series of ten-a-side matches	Clapham Common, near Vauxhall	unknown	
1702	1st Duke of Richmond's XI v Arundel	Sussex	unknown	
1705	West of Kent v Chatham	"Maulden" (Town Malling)	unknown	
1707	London v Mitcham	Lamb's Conduit Field, Holborn	unknown	
1707	Croydon v London	Croydon, probably on Duppas Hill	unknown	
1707	London v Croydon	Lamb's Conduit Field, Holborn	unknown	
1708	A Canterbury team v Ash Street	unknown	The Canterbury team won	
1709	Kent v Surrey	Dartford Brent	unknown	
1717	"A cricket match"	Sussex	unknown	
1718	London v Rochester Punch Club	White Conduit Fields	match abandoned	
1719	London v Rochester Punch Club	White Conduit Fields	London won by 21 runs	
1719	London v Kent	White Conduit Fields	Kent won	
1720	Kingston v Richmond	unknown	Kingston won	
1720	London v Kent	White Conduit Fields	London won	
1721	English sailors	Cambay, India	unknown	
1722	London v Dartford	unknown	unknown	
1723	Surrey v London	Moulsey Hurst	unknown	
1723	Dartford v Tonbridge	Dartford Brent	unknown	
1724	Dartford v London	Dartford Brent	unknown	
1724	London v Dartford	Kennington Common	unknown	
1724	Penshurst, Tonbridge & Wadhurst v Dartford	Penshurst Park	unknown	
1724	Edwin Stead's XI v Chingford	Dartford Brent	match abandoned	
1725	Sir William Gage's XI v another XI	unknown	Gage's XI "shamefully beaten"	
1725	2nd Duke of Richmond's XI v Sir William Gage's XI	Bury Hill, Arundel	Richmond's XI won by "above forty (runs)"	

== Earliest known participants (1598 to 1725) ==
This is a list of people known to have been involved in cricket from its earliest mention until 1725. The list is by season, this being the season in which the person's name first appears in surviving sources. Starting with John Derrick in 1598, many of the people have been named above. They may or may not have been regular players or patrons. Some are referenced only in court cases, or are people who witnessed the sport. The town or village given is where their involvement occurred. Citations reference the earliest-known mention of each person.

Year	Name	Location	Ref.
1598	John Derrick	Guildford, Surrey	
1611	Bartholomew Wyatt	Sidlesham, Sussex	
1611	Richard Latter	Sidlesham, Sussex	
1617	Oliver Cromwell	London	
1622	Edward Hartley	Boxgrove, Sussex	
1622	Anthony Ward	Boxgrove, Sussex	
1622	Raphe West	Boxgrove, Sussex	
1622	Richard Martin Sr	Boxgrove, Sussex	
1622	Richard Martin Jr	Boxgrove, Sussex	
1622	Richard Slaughter	Boxgrove, Sussex	
1622	Thomas West	Boxgrove, Sussex	
1622	William Martin	Boxgrove, Sussex	
1624	Jasper Vinall	West Hoathly, Sussex	
1624	Edward Tye	West Hoathly, Sussex	
1628	Edward Taylor	East Lavant, Sussex	
1628	William Greentree	East Lavant, Sussex	
1629	Henry Cuffin	Ruckinge, Kent	
1636	Henry Mabbinck	West Horsley, Surrey	
1646	Samuel Filmer	Coxheath, Kent	
1646	Thomas Harlackenden	Coxheath, Kent	
1646	Richard Marsh	Maidstone, Kent	
1646	Robert Sanders	Maidstone, Kent	
1646	Walter Franklyn	Maidstone, Kent	
1646	William Cooper	Maidstone, Kent	
1647	Henry Brand	Selsey, Sussex	
1647	Thomas Latter	Selsey, Sussex	
1652	John Rabson	Cranbrook, Kent	
1665	John Churchill, 1st Duke of Marlborough	St Paul's School, London	
1666	Sir Robert Paston	Richmond, Surrey	
1671	Edward Bound	Shere, Surrey	
1673	Thomas Salmon	University of Oxford	
1676	Henry Tonge	British Mission, Aleppo, Ottoman Empire	
1677	Thomas Lennard, 1st Earl of Sussex	Herstmonceux, Sussex	
1694	Sir John Pelham	Lewes, Sussex	
1702	Charles Lennox, 1st Duke of Richmond	Sussex	
1708	Thomas Minter	Canterbury	
1717	Thomas Marchant	Hurstpierpoint, Sussex	
1723	Robert Harley, 1st Earl of Oxford	Dartford Brent	
1724	Edwin Stead	Kent	
1724	William Goodwin	Sunbury	
1724	John Dawson	Penshurst Park	
1725	Sir William Gage, 7th Baronet	Sussex	
1725	Charles Lennox, 2nd Duke of Richmond	Sussex	

== See also ==
- 1725 English cricket season
- Earliest references to cricket in English and Welsh counties
- First known use of English cricket venues (1610–1825)
- History of English cricket (1726–1750)
- List of English cricketers (1701–1786)
- List of historically important English cricket teams
- List of occasional English cricket XIs

== Bibliography ==
- ACS (1981). A Guide to Important Cricket Matches Played in the British Isles 1709–1863. Nottingham: ACS. OCLC 85045528.
- Altham, H. S.; Swanton, E. W. (1962). A History of Cricket, Volume 1 (to 1914) (5th ed.). London: George Allen & Unwin. OCLC 894274808.
- Birley, Derek (1999). A Social History of English Cricket. London: Aurum Press. ISBN 978-18-54107-10-7 – via Internet Archive.
- Bowen, Rowland (1970). Cricket: A History of its Growth and Development. London: Eyre & Spottiswoode. ISBN 978-04-13278-60-9.
- Buckley, G. B. (1935). Fresh Light on 18th Century Cricket. Birmingham: Cotterell & Co. OCLC 23450280.
- Buckley, G. B. (1937). Fresh Light on pre-Victorian Cricket. Birmingham: Cotterell & Co. OCLC 23469107.
- Haygarth, Arthur (1996) [1862]. Scores & Biographies, Volume 1 (1744–1826). Kennington: Frederick Lillywhite. ISBN 978-19-00592-23-9.
- Major, John (2007). More Than A Game. London: HarperCollins. ISBN 978-00-07183-64-7 – via Internet Archive.
- Maun, Ian (2009). From Commons to Lord's, Volume One: 1700 to 1750. Cambridge: Roger Heavens. ISBN 978-19-00592-52-9.
- McCann, Tim (2004). Sussex Cricket in the Eighteenth Century (PDF). Vol. 88. Lewes: West Sussex Record Office. ISBN 978-08-54450-55-8.
- Nyren, John (1998) [1832]. Mote, Ashley (ed.). The Cricketers of my Time. London: Robson Publishing. ISBN 978-18-61051-68-4.
- Underdown, David (2000). Start of Play. Westminster: Allen Lane. ISBN 978-07-13993-30-1 – via Internet Archive.
- Waghorn, H. T. (2005) [1906]. The Dawn of Cricket. London: J. W. McKenzie. ISBN 978-09-47821-17-3.
- Webber, Roy (1960). The Phoenix History of Cricket. Charing Cross, London: Phoenix House Ltd. OCLC 5391059.
- Wilson, Martin (2005). An Index to Waghorn. London: Bodyline Books (limited edition, by subscription only). [ISBN unspecified]
- Wisden (1963). Preston, Norman (ed.). Wisden Cricketers' Almanack (100th ed.). London: Sporting Handbooks Ltd. OCLC 5629471.
