= 1733 English cricket season =

Cricket season review

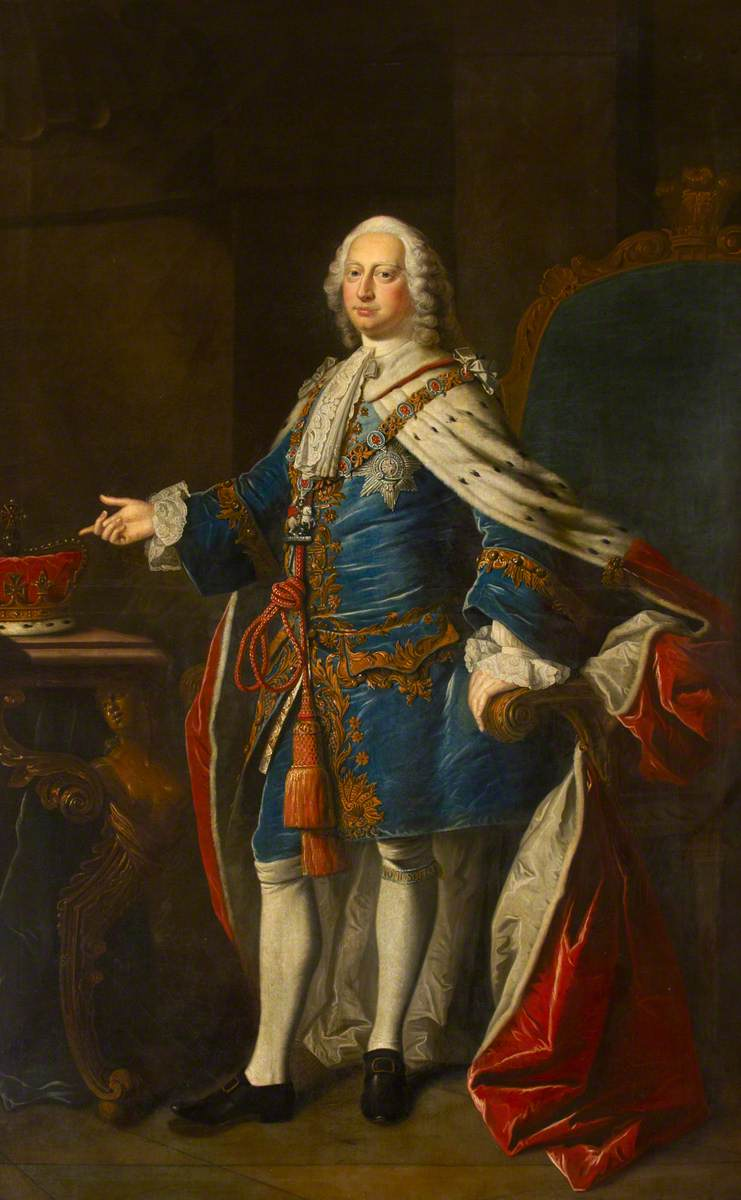
Frederick, Prince of Wales, in 1750.

In the 1733 English cricket season, the Prince of Wales increased his patronage of the sport by awarding a trophy to the winners of one game, and forming his own team to play in another. Two local matches in Hampshire are the earliest that are definitely known to have been played in the county. Fourteen historically important matches have been recorded. (Note: Any match listed in the ACS' Important Match Guide (1981) is historically important, and therefore of the highest standard, whether or not a scorecard might exist. The same applies to numerous matches discovered by researchers since 1981. For further information, see First-class cricket.)

== County teams ==
Kent played London twice, and also faced a combined Middlesex & Surrey team. There were two one-on-one inter-county matches which both involved Surrey.

=== Kent v London ===
Kent's first match was against London at the Artillery Ground on 5 July. It was advertised as for one guinea each man with wickets to be pitched at one o'clock and the spectators to keep outside the line round the ground. The notice also said: "If any persons get on the Walls (sic), they will be prosecuted as the Law directs; and the Company are desired to come through the Py'd Horse Yard, Chiswell Street". Kent won by 60 runs.

Kent and London met again at the Artillery Ground on 12 September, and Kent won by 3 wickets. This is the earliest known result wherein the win was by a certain number of wickets, unless the Richmond v Chambers game in 1731 was actually conceded by Richmond. London scored 65 & 35; Kent scored 71 "and the second hands of the Kentish men won the wager and had three men to spare".

=== Surrey v Middlesex ===
Surrey played Middlesex on about 11 July at Moulsey Hurst. Middlesex won by three runs, and a newspaper report says the teams "were very hard matched". The Prince of Wales was present, and gave each player a guinea after the game.

=== Kent v Middlesex & Surrey ===
Immediately after the Surrey/Middlesex match, the Prince and Edwin Stead arranged the match between Kent and the Middlesex & Surrey combine. This was played on 1 August at Moulsey Hurst. Middlesex & Surrey won by an unknown margin, and the Prince of Wales awarded a silver cup to the team. That is the first known instance of a trophy being presented.

=== Surrey v Kent ===
In the second inter-county match, Surrey played Kent on 10 September at Kennington Common. A pre-match notice said the enclosure would be roped around, as was by then normal at Kennington. The result is unknown.

== Prince of Wales' XI v Lord Gage's XI ==
The match between Frederick, Prince of Wales' XI and Lord Gage's XI was scheduled for 31 August on Moulsey Hurst. Lord Gage was the former Sir William Gage. The Prince of Wales had by now become another great patron of the sport. The match was pre-announced in the St James Evening Post as:

On Friday next a great Match at Cricket will be play’d on Molesey Hurst; by 11 of the best Players in the County on each Side, for a Wager of 100 Guineas between His Royal Highness the Prince of Wales, and the Right Honorable, the Lord Gage.

The result is unknown.

== London v Croydon ==
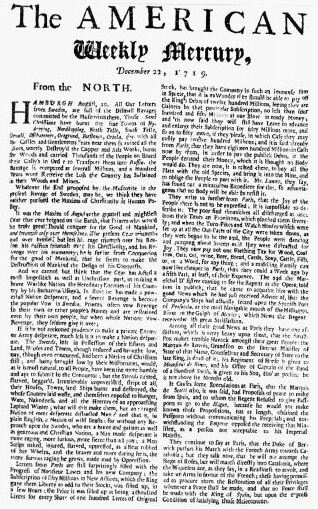
A 1719 issue of the American Weekly Mercury.

The rivalry between London and Croydon was renewed with two matches in September. The first was at Duppas Hill, Croydon, probably on the 19th. Team scores are known: Croydon 95 & 76; London 89 & 41/5. Time expired and the result was a draw. Croydon had three given men and it was reported that the betting reached record levels, but that statement could not have been verifiable even at the time. The Croydon team was called "the country men". The report said a rematch would take place at the Artillery Ground "on Wednesday next" (the 26th).

The rematch ended in a draw, due to rain. London had a lead of eight runs when play was abandoned, but it is not known what stage the game had reached. It was reported in the Whitehall Evening Post dated Saturday, 29 September.

== Other events ==
On Tuesday, 22 May, the earliest known match in Hampshire took place at Stubbington, near Portsmouth, when a team of bachelors were beaten "most shamefully" by a team of married men. A week later, on the 29th, a return match took place at Titchfield and the married men won again. The report for these matches was found in the American Weekly Mercury, a Philadelphia newspaper, dated 20 to 27 September 1733.

On 22 and 28 May, London played two matches against Greenwich. The first was at Blackheath, and London won by 15 runs. The return was at the Artillery Ground, and London won by 18 runs.

There was a match at Parsons Green, in London, on 26 June between Fulham and Chelsea. The result is unknown, but it was played for a prize of thirty guineas. Little is known about either of these teams, but the stake was high, and the match was pre-announced in a newspaper, Berington's Evening Post.

London had a match against Acton & Ealing on 20 August, at Ealing Common. The terms were "for £50, play or pay". This is the only mention of an Acton & Ealing team in the surviving records, and also of Ealing Common. As with the Fulham v Chelsea match, the stake was high, and it was announced in Berington's Evening Post.

== First mentions ==
=== Clubs and teams ===
- Acton & Ealing
- Frederick, Prince of Wales' XI
- Middlesex & Surrey (combined)

=== Venues ===
- Ealing Common

== Bibliography ==
- ACS (1981). A Guide to Important Cricket Matches Played in the British Isles 1709–1863. Nottingham: ACS. OCLC 85045528.
- Ashley-Cooper, F. S. (1929). Kent Cricket Matches, 1719–1880. Canterbury: Gibbs & Sons. OCLC 220674085.
- Buckley, G. B. (1935). Fresh Light on 18th Century Cricket. Birmingham: Cotterell & Co. OCLC 23450280.
- Maun, Ian (2009). From Commons to Lord's, Volume One: 1700 to 1750. Cambridge: Roger Heavens. ISBN 978-19-00592-52-9.
- McCann, Tim (2004). Sussex Cricket in the Eighteenth Century (PDF). Vol. 88. Lewes: West Sussex Record Office. ISBN 978-08-54450-55-8.
- Waghorn, H. T. (1899). Cricket Scores, Notes, &c. From 1730–1773. Edinburgh: Blackwood. OCLC 1086375331.
- Waghorn, H. T. (2005) [1906]. The Dawn of Cricket. London: J. W. McKenzie. ISBN 978-09-47821-17-3.
