= 1762 English cricket season =

Cricket season review

Details have survived of eight historically important eleven-a-side matches in the 1762 English cricket season. (Note: Any match listed in the ACS' Important Match Guide (1981) is historically important, and therefore of the highest standard, whether or not a scorecard might exist. The same applies to numerous matches discovered by researchers since 1981. For further information, see First-class cricket.) Chertsey was again the most active club.

== Matches ==
=== Guildford v Chertsey ===
Guildford played Chertsey 21 June on Merrow Down; in what may have been a tight finish, Chertsey apparently won by two runs. H. T. Waghorn's source says 'the former brought 99 and the latter 101', so the result was probably a win for Chertsey by two runs; evidently the stakes amounted to 'several hundred pounds'.

=== Kent matches ===
Kent are known to have played two matches in 1762: against Surrey at an unspecified venue in Carshalton on 19 July; and against London at the Artillery Ground on 30 August.

The Carshalton game was played for 100 guineas but was undecided. Waghorn's source says: '...but was not decided, a dispute arising about one of the players being catched (sic) out when Surrey was 50 ahead the first innings. From words they came to blows, which occasioned several broken heads, as likewise a challenge between two persons of distinction. The confusion was so great that the bets were withdrawn'.

London won the match in August, which was 'played eleven-a-side for a considerable sum', by 8 wickets.

=== Chertsey v Middlesex ===
Chertsey played two matches against Middlesex: 30 August on Laleham Burway; and 7 September on Moulsey Hurst. Middlesex won by 6 wickets on 30 August, and by an unknown margin in September.

When pre-announcing the return match, the Daily Advertiser on Saturday, 4 September, referred to the first match by saying that Middlesex won 'with great difficulty', but later reported that Middlesex 'had five to go in when they beat them'. (Note: Contemporary reports tended to number the men who have 'not yet gone in', and it must be remembered that there are two men who have gone in who are still not out, so when there are 'five to go in' it means that four wickets have fallen, as the fifth wicket partnership is intact.) Following the second match, the Daily Advertiser described the teams as 'the County of Middlesex' and 'the parish of Chertsey'.

=== Chertsey v the Rest of Surrey ===
This match was played 13 September on Ripley Green for £50, but the result is unknown. Chertsey had a very strong team at this time—when John Edmeads, Will Palmer, Lumpy Stevens, and William Yalden were all active—so a game against the rest of Surrey would be a significant fixture. The Daily Advertiser carried the curious sentence: 'Ordinary at Mr Fowler's at the White Horse', an Ordinary being an 'ordinary dinner'.

=== Chertsey & Dartford v London & Middlesex ===
A report in the Daily Advertiser on Friday, 17 September, says that these teams are: 'the County of Middlesex and London against the famous (sic) Parish of Chertsey with 3 of the best men from Dartford in Kent'. This underlines the afore-mentioned quality of the Chertsey team. The report also confirms the dates and venues of the two games, saying: 'Each match to begin at 11, and to be played out'.

The first match was played 21 September on Hampton Court Green, but the result is unknown. The second was 27 September on Laleham Burway, but again the result is unknown.

== First mentions ==
=== Clubs and teams ===
- Chertsey & Dartford

=== Venues ===
- Carshalton (unspecified)

== Bibliography ==
- ACS (1981). A Guide to Important Cricket Matches Played in the British Isles 1709–1863. Nottingham: ACS. OCLC 85045528.
- Buckley, G. B. (1935). Fresh Light on 18th Century Cricket. Birmingham: Cotterell & Co. OCLC 23450280.
- Waghorn, H. T. (1899). Cricket Scores, Notes, &c. From 1730–1773. Edinburgh: Blackwood. OCLC 1086375331.
