= 1765 English cricket season =

Cricket season review

Only six historically important matches (Note: Any match listed in the ACS' Important Match Guide (1981) is historically important, and therefore of the highest standard, whether or not a scorecard might exist. The same applies to numerous matches discovered by researchers since 1981. For further information, see First-class cricket.) were reported in the 1765 English cricket season, though a positive development was the clear indication of increased cricket activity in the north of England as Leeds played Sheffield. However, events at the Artillery Ground in August may have been almost the last straw where this infamous old venue was concerned.

== Artillery Ground in disrepute ==
On 19 and 20 August, the Artillery Ground staged a match between Surrey and Dartford. Surrey won by an unknown margin. The match was played for 100 guineas per side, before a crowd estimated at 12,000.

At close of play on the first day, a report condemned 'the mob (many of whom had laid large bets), imagining foul play, several of whom were dangerously wounded and bruised'.

A few days later, the St James Chronicle reported: 'A young fellow, a butcher, being entrusted with about £40 by his mistress to buy cattle in Smithfield market, instead went into the Artillery Ground and sported away the whole sum in betting upon the Cricket players'.

The reports are evidence of the Artillery Ground having fallen into disrepute, and it is a fact that few matches of importance were played there after 1765, until the last in September 1778.

== Leeds v Sheffield ==
A Leeds v Sheffield match was reported by the London Chronicle on Thursday, 5 September. It took place on Chapeltown Moor, near Leeds. Sheffield won 'with great difficulty'. It was rated a 'great match', and reported by a London newspaper, which shows that cricket was already well-established in Yorkshire only 14 years after it was first recorded there.

The teams played a return match at an unspecified venue in Sheffield on Friday, 5 September, but the result is unknown. By the 1820s, Sheffield were playing at Darnall Old Ground, and then Darnall New Ground. They switched to the Hyde Park ground in 1830, and then to Bramall Lane in 1855.

== Chertsey v Richmond ==
Chertsey and Richmond met twice in 1765. The dates are uncertain, but approximately 9 and 16 September. The first match was on Laleham Burway (result unknown), and the second on Richmond Green. Chertsey won the second match by 106 runs, having scored 130 and 116 while Richmond made 48 and 92. The source says: 'Chertsey headed 94', which is incorrect according to the given team totals. The report also said Stephen Harding scored 24 in four balls with a five, two sixes and a seven. The Edmeads brothers, John and Richard, scored 108 between them in the whole match. This is the sole mention in sources of Richard Edmeads.

== Other events ==
In single wicket, there was a 'threes' game on Friday 30 August at Moulsey Hurst in which Surrey beat Kent 'after a smart contest'. The source is the Gazetteer & London Daily Advertiser on Wednesday, 4 September.

A notice in the Salisbury Journal on Monday, 16 September, might have interested the members of the Hambledon Club: 'The Cricket players of the parish of Portsea (in Hampshire) will play the game of Cricket with any parish in the said County for 20 guineas each match, home and home (sic)'. It is not known if the challenge was taken up.

== First mentions ==
=== Clubs and teams ===
- Leeds

=== Players ===
- Richard Edmeads

=== Venues ===
- Sheffield (unspecified)

== Bibliography ==
- ACS (1981). A Guide to Important Cricket Matches Played in the British Isles 1709–1863. Nottingham: ACS. OCLC 85045528.
- Buckley, G. B. (1935). Fresh Light on 18th Century Cricket. Birmingham: Cotterell & Co. OCLC 23450280.
- Buckley, G. B. (1937). Fresh Light on pre-Victorian Cricket. Birmingham: Cotterell & Co. OCLC 23469107.
- Maun, Ian (2011). From Commons to Lord's, Volume Two: 1751 to 1770. Leicester: Martin Wilson. ISBN 978-09-56906-60-1.
- Waghorn, H. T. (1899). Cricket Scores, Notes, &c. From 1730–1773. Edinburgh: Blackwood. OCLC 1086375331.
