= 1757 English cricket season =

Cricket season review

Details have survived of two eleven-a-side matches in the 1757 English cricket season, but no notable single wicket matches. (Note: Any match listed in the ACS' Important Match Guide (1981) is historically important, and therefore of the highest standard, whether or not a scorecard might exist. The same applies to numerous matches discovered by researchers since 1981. For further information, see First-class cricket.) This was the first full season since the outbreak of the Seven Years' War in May 1756.

== London v Surrey ==
There was only one "great match" in 1756, played 25 and 26 July on the Artillery Ground between London and Surrey. Surrey batted first, and scored 84, to which London replied with 89. Surrey batted until close of play when they were apparently 126/4. It seems that London batted when play restarted on Tuesday morning and scored 71. The primary source concludes: "so that Surrey beat London by 50 notches and had six wickets to knock down". That suggests there may have been a declaration by Surrey. However, there are conflicting versions because the London Chronicle on Tuesday, 26 July, reported the close of play score on Monday as "(Surrey) had three hands put out but had got 117 notches ahead". That would make the close of play score 122/3, so it seems they received a slightly premature report, as confirmed in another source.

== Chertsey v Hampton ==
On 26 August, Chertsey played Hampton on Moulsey Hurst. As reported in the General Evening Post next day, Chertsey won, but the margin was not mentioned.

== Derbyshire ==
A match in September between Wirksworth and Sheffield at Brampton Moor, near Chesterfield, is the earliest reference to cricket in Derbyshire. Although cricket is known to have been played in Sheffield since 1751, this may be the earliest indication of the Sheffield Cricket Club from which Yorkshire County Cricket Club eventually evolved.

== Sheffield ==
The following reference is contained in William White's History & General Directory of the Borough of Sheffield (1833). In his introductory history, Mr White says:

In 1757 we find the Town Trustees attempting the abolition of brutal sports by paying 14s 6d to the cricket players on Shrove Tuesday "to entertain the populace and prevent the infamous practice of throwing at cocks".

He does not give the primary source from which he himself derived the information but it would likely be in parish or town records of some kind which may or may not still exist. There is a reference to the same in Waghorn who quotes his source as the much later Records of the Burgery of Sheffield (1897) by Jno. D Leader (p. 382) which dates the contract as 6 February 1757 (which may have been a Julian date as 6 February 1757 in the Gregorian Calendar was a Sunday).

== First mentions ==
=== Counties ===
- Derbyshire

=== Clubs and teams ===
- Sheffield Cricket Club
- Wirksworth

=== Venues ===
- Brampton Moor

== Bibliography ==
- ACS (1981). A Guide to Important Cricket Matches Played in the British Isles 1709–1863. Nottingham: ACS. OCLC 85045528.
- Bowen, Rowland (1970). Cricket: A History of its Growth and Development. London: Eyre & Spottiswoode. ISBN 978-04-13278-60-9.
- Buckley, G. B. (1935). Fresh Light on 18th Century Cricket. Birmingham: Cotterell & Co. OCLC 23450280.
- Buckley, G. B. (1937). Fresh Light on pre-Victorian Cricket. Birmingham: Cotterell & Co. OCLC 23469107.
- Waghorn, H. T. (1899). Cricket Scores, Notes, &c. From 1730–1773. Edinburgh: Blackwood. OCLC 1086375331.
- Waghorn, H. T. (2005) [1906]. The Dawn of Cricket. London: J. W. McKenzie. ISBN 978-09-47821-17-3.
