= 1741 to 1745 in sports =

Events in world sport through the years 1741 to 1745.

== Boxing ==
Events

- 24 April 1741 — Broughton defeated George Stevenson after 35 minutes and in the 4th round of a fight in London. Stevenson's injuries were serious and he died a few days later.
- May 1741 — Upset by Stevenson's death, Broughton retired from the ring. He returned in March 1743; George Taylor reclaimed the title in 1741.
- 16 June 1741 — Taylor defeated Prince Boswell at London after 2 hours and 15 minutes in the 4th round.
- 1741 — Together with the aristocratic patrons of his boxing academy, Broughton proposed and eventually drafted a set of rules to improve ring safety.
- 1743 — Jack Slack (the " Norfolk Butcher") defeated three local opponents and was recognized as the Norfolk county champion.
- 10 March 1743 — Broughton opened his amphitheatre on Oxford Street.
- 13 March 1743 — Broughton announced his comeback and reclaimed the Championship of England, which George Taylor had held since May 1741.
- 13 March 1743 — George Taylor v Sailor Field was scheduled to take place in London but, for an unknown reason, was cancelled.
- 16 Aug 1743 — Broughton published his Rules of the Ring (aka Broughton's Rules), in which Rule VII reads: "That no person is to hit his Adversary when he is down, or seize him by the ham, the breeches, or any part below the waist: a man on his knees to be reckoned down".
- 1744 — Broughton successfully defended his title three times to 1746 against Chicken Harris, Jack James and Tom Smallwood and all fights were in London.
- 1744 — Taylor closed his Amphitheatre and went to work for Jack Broughton at his place for several years. There, he took on all-comers and never lost a fight until 1750.
- 24 June 1744 — Slack defeated Daniel Smith in a 20-minute fight in East Anglia.
- 12 November 1744 — Slack defeated Daniel Smith at Framlingham in a 45-minute 18th round fight.
- 1745 — Slack defeated several opponents in provincial rings.

== Cricket ==
Events

- 1741 — emergence of Slindon Cricket Club; its most outstanding player was Richard Newland.
- 1743 — first mention in the sources of the great Kent batsman Robert Colchin.
- 1744 — first codification of the Laws of Cricket, by the Star and Garter club of Pall Mall in London; these Laws do not say the bowler must roll the ball and there is no mention of prescribed arm action so, in theory, a pitched delivery would have been legal, although pitching was not introduced until the 1760s.
- 1744 — the earliest known scorecards were created for two matches this season but they did not come into regular use until 1772.
- 1745 to 1748 — single wicket cricket became increasingly popular and was the main form of cricket in England during this decade with lucrative contests taking place at the Artillery Ground in particular.

== Horse racing ==
Events

- c.1750 — Formation of the Jockey Club to establish rules for British racing.

== Sources ==
- Buckley, G. B. (1935). Fresh Light on 18th Century Cricket. Cotterell.
- Maun, Ian (2009). From Commons to Lord's, Volume One: 1700 to 1750. Roger Heavens. ISBN 978-1-900592-52-9.
- McCann, Tim (2004). Sussex Cricket in the Eighteenth Century. Sussex Record Society.
- Waghorn, H. T. (1906). The Dawn of Cricket. Electric Press.
