= 1736 to 1740 in sports =

Events in world sport through the years 1736 to 1740.

== Boxing ==
Events

- 1736 — Broughton defeated Bill Gretting, but it is unclear if it was a championship fight.
- 1736 — Broughton defeated Taylor after 20 minutes in London. Broughton claimed the English title and held it until 1750.
- 1737 — Broughton defeated John Smith ("Buckhorse") in London to retain the title.
- 1738 — Broughton defeated Prince Boswell in London to retain the title.
- 1739 — Broughton defeated Will Willis in London to retain the title.
- 1740 — Broughton defeated Sailor Field in London to retain the title.

== Horse racing ==
Events

- 1740 — Parliament introduced an Act "to restrain and to prevent the excessive increase in horse racing", though it was largely ignored.

== Sources ==
- Buckley, G. B. (1935). Fresh Light on 18th Century Cricket. Cotterell.
- Maun, Ian (2009). From Commons to Lord's, Volume One: 1700 to 1750. Roger Heavens. ISBN 978-1-900592-52-9.
- McCann, Tim (2004). Sussex Cricket in the Eighteenth Century. Sussex Record Society.
- Waghorn, H. T. (1906). The Dawn of Cricket. Electric Press.
