= Earliest references to cricket in English and Welsh counties =

This article records the first known references to cricket being played in the historic counties of England and Wales. Dates for the countries of Ireland, Scotland, and Wales are also included.

Note: Online databases are excluded from this page as the scope is historical, and NOT statistical.

== List ==
- Surrey – c.1550 re John Derrick as a boy, and the 1597 Old Style (1598 New Style) Guildford court case; the world's earliest definite mention of cricket
- Kent – c.1610 re the match at Chevening, the world's oldest known organised match
- Sussex – 1611 re an ecclesiastical court case
- Hampshire – 1647 at Winchester College
- London – 1617 re Oliver Cromwell
- Oxfordshire – 1673 at the University of Oxford
- Middlesex – 1680; also the first mention re umpires
- Cambridgeshire – 1710 at the University of Cambridge

- Essex – 1724 re the Chingford-Stead match
- Berkshire – 1727 at Eton College
- Gloucestershire – 1729
- Buckinghamshire – 1730
- Hertfordshire – 1732
- Dorset – 1738
- Bedfordshire – 1741
- Huntingdonshire – 1741
- Northamptonshire – 1741
- Suffolk – 1743
- Norfolk – 1745
- Scotland – 1750 re a military match in Perth
- Durham – 1751
- Somerset – 1751
- Warwickshire – 1751
- Yorkshire – 1751
- Northumberland – 1753
- Derbyshire – 1757
- Wales and Glamorgan – 1771 re local matches in Swansea
- Nottinghamshire – 1771
- Wiltshire – c.1774 (Note: There is no certainty about when cricket was first mentioned in Wiltshire. Rowland Bowen gave 1769 as the first date, but he had mistakenly ascribed a Hampshire venue to Wiltshire. John Major, writing about an event in 1799, stated that cricket had been played in the towns of Calne, Devizes, Salisbury, and Marlborough 'for a quarter of a century'.)
- Leicestershire – 1776
- Cheshire – 1781
- Lancashire – 1781
- Rutland – 1790
- Ireland – 1792 re a military match in Dublin
- Lincolnshire – 1792
- Shropshire – 1794
- Devon – 1799
- Cornwall – 1813
- Staffordshire – 1817
- Herefordshire – 1823
- Westmorland – 1827
- Cumberland – 1828
- Worcestershire – 1829

== See also ==
- County cricket
- First known use of English cricket venues (1610–1825)
- History of cricket to 1725
- List of historically important English cricket teams
- List of occasional English cricket XIs

== Bibliography ==
- Altham, H. S.; Swanton, E. W. (1962). A History of Cricket, Volume 1 (to 1914) (5th ed.). London: George Allen & Unwin. OCLC 894274808.
- Birley, Derek (1999). A Social History of English Cricket. London: Aurum Press. ISBN 978-18-54107-10-7 – via Internet Archive.
- Bowen, Rowland (1970). Cricket: A History of its Growth and Development. London: Eyre & Spottiswoode. ISBN 978-04-13278-60-9.
- Buckley, G. B. (1935). Fresh Light on 18th Century Cricket. Birmingham: Cotterell & Co. OCLC 23450280.
- Buckley, G. B. (1937). Fresh Light on pre-Victorian Cricket. Birmingham: Cotterell & Co. OCLC 23469107.
- Major, John (2007). More Than A Game. London: HarperCollins. ISBN 978-00-07183-64-7 – via Internet Archive.
- Maun, Ian (2009). From Commons to Lord's, Volume One: 1700 to 1750. Cambridge: Roger Heavens. ISBN 978-19-00592-52-9.
- Maun, Ian (2011). From Commons to Lord's, Volume Two: 1751 to 1770. Leicester: Martin Wilson. ISBN 978-09-56906-60-1.
- Underdown, David (2000). Start of Play. Westminster: Allen Lane. ISBN 978-07-13993-30-1 – via Internet Archive.
- Waghorn, H. T. (1899). Cricket Scores, Notes, &c. From 1730–1773. Edinburgh: Blackwood. OCLC 1086375331.
- Waghorn, H. T. (2005) [1906]. The Dawn of Cricket. London: J. W. McKenzie. ISBN 978-09-47821-17-3.
