= 1758 English cricket season =

Cricket season review

Details have survived of one major eleven-a-side match in the 1758 English cricket season, and one single wicket event. (Note: Any match listed in the ACS' Important Match Guide (1981) is historically important, and therefore of the highest standard, whether or not a scorecard might exist. The same applies to numerous matches discovered by researchers since 1981. For further information, see First-class cricket.)

== London & Surrey v Kent ==
In the only "great match" of the season, the London & Surrey combine played against Kent. The venue is uncertain, and it is possible that a return game took place at any of about five venues, but the report in the General Evening Post (three weeks later) is very ambiguous. This match was played 16/17 August, probably on the Artillery Ground, and was won by London & Surrey.

== Single wicket ==
A "fives" game was held on Kennington Common in August. Tom Faulkner, one of the Harris brothers, and three more of the London club defeated five players from various Surrey clubs by three wickets.

== Impact of the war ==
The reduction in the number of matches was essentially due to the Seven Years' War. In G. B. Buckley's Fresh Light on 18th Century Cricket, he recorded a number of inter-parish games including: Saffron Walden v Cambridge; Faversham v Tenterden; Faversham v Dover; New Romney v Ashford. The presence of these and the absence of "great matches" suggests a lack of investment and resource in the game during wartime with the sport falling back onto its parish roots.

== Bibliography ==
- ACS (1981). A Guide to Important Cricket Matches Played in the British Isles 1709–1863. Nottingham: ACS. OCLC 85045528.
- Buckley, G. B. (1935). Fresh Light on 18th Century Cricket. Birmingham: Cotterell & Co. OCLC 23450280.
- Waghorn, H. T. (1899). Cricket Scores, Notes, &c. From 1730–1773. Edinburgh: Blackwood. OCLC 1086375331.
