= 1766 English cricket season =

Cricket season review

Details of only three historically important eleven-a-side matches have survived the 1766 English cricket season. (Note: Any match listed in the ACS' Important Match Guide (1981) is historically important, and therefore of the highest standard, whether or not a scorecard might exist. The same applies to numerous matches discovered by researchers since 1981. For further information, see First-class cricket.)

== Matches ==
Sussex met Hampshire at a place called the Race Down, in the county of Hampshire. The London Evening Post on 8 May 1766 said: 'On Thursday the 19th, will be played a Grand Subscription Cricket Match, play'd on the Race Down, between the Counties of Hampshire and Sussex. The Wickets to be pitched by Ten o'Clock'. It is known that the odds were 40 to 1 against Hampshire after the first innings. The match is the earliest reference to Hampshire, who won it by an unknown margin, as an individual county team.

On 29 September, Bourne Cricket Club, long associated with Sir Horatio Mann, played Dartford on Bishopsbourne Paddock. No details are known of the game apart from a brief mention in the Kentish Weekly Post.

As late as 8 October, Chertsey met Hambledon on Dartford Brent, a neutral venue. The result is unknown.

== Demise of the Artillery Ground ==
Perhaps another nail in the coffin of the Artillery Ground when its latest keeper, Mr Read, died on Thursday, 25 September. Like George Smith before him, he was also the landlord of the Pyed Horse Inn.

== The Bartholomews ==
On Thursday, 6 February, Robert Bartholomew died. He had played for Surrey in the 1750s, and may have been related to the Bartholomews who played for Chertsey in the 1770s. He was the master of the Angel Inn at Islington, and also of White Conduit House.

== First mentions ==
=== Clubs and teams ===
- Bourne
- Hampshire (pre-1864)

=== Players ===
- Sir Horatio Mann

=== Venues ===
- Bishopsbourne Paddock

== Bibliography ==
- ACS (1981). A Guide to Important Cricket Matches Played in the British Isles 1709–1863. Nottingham: ACS. OCLC 85045528.
- Buckley, G. B. (1937). Fresh Light on pre-Victorian Cricket. Birmingham: Cotterell & Co. OCLC 23469107.
- Maun, Ian (2011). From Commons to Lord's, Volume Two: 1751 to 1770. Leicester: Martin Wilson. ISBN 978-09-56906-60-1.
- Waghorn, H. T. (1899). Cricket Scores, Notes, &c. From 1730–1773. Edinburgh: Blackwood. OCLC 1086375331.
