= Peter Stewart (cricketer) =

English cricketer

Peter "Buck" Stewart (1730–1796) was an English cricketer who played for the Hambledon Club in its great days during the 1760s and 1770s.

Known to have been nicknamed "Buck" because he was a "natty dresser", Stewart was a considerable player but one of many whose best years were before 1772 and whose records are mostly lost.

Stewart worked as a carpenter, shoemaker and innkeeper. He is said to have been one of the team's characters and a noted humorist. He was a good batsman in his prime and strong in his offside strokes.

Stewart was a stoic, durable player. In one 1764 game against Chertsey, he played with a knee strain and a broken finger.
