= 1738 English cricket season =

Cricket season review

As in 1737, Kent was the strongest county team in the 1738 English cricket season. London Cricket Club is featured in most of the surviving match reports. Chislehurst Cricket Club and Horsmonden Cricket Club became prominent. The earliest reference to cricket in the county of Dorset has been found.

Details of eight historically important matches are known. (Note: Any match listed in the ACS' Important Match Guide (1981) is historically important, and therefore of the highest standard, whether or not a scorecard might exist. The same applies to numerous matches discovered by researchers since 1981. For further information, see First-class cricket.)

== Kent v London & Surrey ==
In July, Kent played two matches against a London & Surrey combine. One match was played on Kennington Common, and Kent "won easily" to repeat their successes in two 1737 matches against the same opponents. A return was planned at another venue, but no details have been found.

== Chislehurst v Horsmonden ==
A Chislehurst v Horsmonden match was played 11 July on Chislehurst Common for "a considerable sum of money". It is the first known reference to each of these teams who were prominent for a few seasons before and after 1740. Chislehurst won, and a return match took place 21 July in Horsmonden. This was won by Horsmonden "in one Hands (sic), all but 4 notches". The use of "hands" in this context means "innings", so Horsmonden achieved an innings victory, one of the earliest on record.

== Chislehurst v London ==
The teams met 12 July on Chislehurst Common in a game that "turned several times" until finally being won by London. A rematch was arranged a week hence at the Artillery Ground. In that one, London scored less than 100 in their combined innings. Chislehurst had scored 73 in the first innings, and won "without much difficulty" by 5 wickets.

A third match was played in September at the Artillery Ground, and London won by an unknown margin. The newspaper report said nothing else about the game, but did say betting on London at the start of the second innings was "a guinea to a shilling".

== London v Mitcham ==
Played 11 August at the Artillery Ground, Mitcham totalled 117/20 in their two innings, and London made 118/19 to win by one wicket. Strangely, given the distance involved, the only report of this match was in the Warwickshire & Staffordshire Journal dated Thursday, 17 August.

== Other events ==
An advertisement in the Sherborne Mercury dated Tuesday, 9 May, is the earliest reference to cricket in Dorset. Twelve Dorchester men at Ridgway (sic) Races challenged twelve men from elsewhere to play them at cricket for the prize of twelve pairs of gloves valued at a shilling a pair.

In September, there was an inter-parish match in Sussex between teams from Eastbourne and Battle. Lord John Sackville captained Eastbourne, who won by 4 wickets.

== First mentions ==
=== Counties ===
- Dorset

=== Clubs and teams ===
- Chislehurst
- Horsmonden

=== Venues ===
- Chislehurst Common
- Dorchester (unspecified)
- Horsmonden (unspecified)

== Bibliography ==
- ACS (1981). A Guide to Important Cricket Matches Played in the British Isles 1709–1863. Nottingham: ACS. OCLC 85045528.
- Buckley, G. B. (1935). Fresh Light on 18th Century Cricket. Birmingham: Cotterell & Co. OCLC 23450280.
- Major, John (2007). More Than A Game. London: HarperCollins. ISBN 978-00-07183-64-7 – via Internet Archive.
- Maun, Ian (2009). From Commons to Lord's, Volume One: 1700 to 1750. Cambridge: Roger Heavens. ISBN 978-19-00592-52-9.
- Waghorn, H. T. (1899). Cricket Scores, Notes, &c. From 1730–1773. Edinburgh: Blackwood. OCLC 1086375331.
