= Greenwich Cricket Club =

Historical English cricket team

Representing Greenwich which was then in Kent, the original Greenwich Cricket Club took part in known matches between 1730 and 1767. According to surviving records the team used an unknown location on nearby Blackheath for its home matches. Greenwich teams are recorded, either individually or jointly with other clubs, in four known matches.
