= John Edmeads =

English cricketer (?–1802)

John Edmeads (born ? at Chertsey in Surrey; died July 1802 at Staines) was an English cricketer who played for Chertsey Cricket Club, Surrey, and England.

== Career ==
Edmeads seems to have begun his career in the 1750s and played until 1779, making 19 known appearances in historically important matches from the beginning of the statistical record in 1772, by when his best years were probably behind him. He was a noted batsman and fielder.

== Family ==
He kept Simplemarsh Farm in the Chertsey parish; the farm was in his family for over 200 years. There was also a Richard Edmeads, probably John's brother, who is known to have played in one match for Chertsey in 1765.

== Bibliography ==
- Haygarth, Arthur (1996) [1862]. Scores & Biographies, Volume 1 (1744–1826). Kennington: Frederick Lillywhite. ISBN 978-19-00592-23-9.
- Waghorn, H. T. (1899). Cricket Scores, Notes, &c. From 1730–1773. Edinburgh: Blackwood. OCLC 1086375331.
