= Arundel Cricket Club =

Historical English cricket team

Team information
- Established: 1704; 322 years ago
- Home venue: Arundel Cricket Club, Arundel

Arundel Cricket Club is in the town of Arundel in West Sussex, and was founded in 1704. The club's first XI plays in Division 1 of the West Sussex Invitation League They currently have three Saturday League teams, a Club (Friendly) XI and multiple Junior teams ranging from U10s to U16s.

The earliest known mention of an Arundel team is a match in 1702 when it played against the 1st Duke of Richmond's XI. Richmond had his estate at Goodwood, while Arundel is near Bury Hill which was used for cricket in later years. However, the venue in 1702 remains unknown. Knowledge of the match comes from a receipt sent by one Saul Bradley to the Duke on Monday, 14 December 1702, in respect of 1s 6d paid by the Duke "for brandy when your Grace plaid (sic) at Cricket with Arundel men".

In 1764, the Sussex Weekly Advertiser reported on Monday, 24 September, that a match between Arundel and East Sussex was played 21 September on Henfield Common. Arundel won by 2 wickets.

== Bibliography ==
- Buckley, G. B. (1937). Fresh Light on pre-Victorian Cricket. Birmingham: Cotterell & Co. OCLC 23469107.
- McCann, Tim (2004). Sussex Cricket in the Eighteenth Century (PDF). Vol. 88. Lewes: West Sussex Record Office. ISBN 978-08-54450-55-8.
