= Moulsey Hurst =

Cricket ground located in United Kingdom

Coordinates: 51.410°N 0.361°W

Moulsey Hurst cricket ground
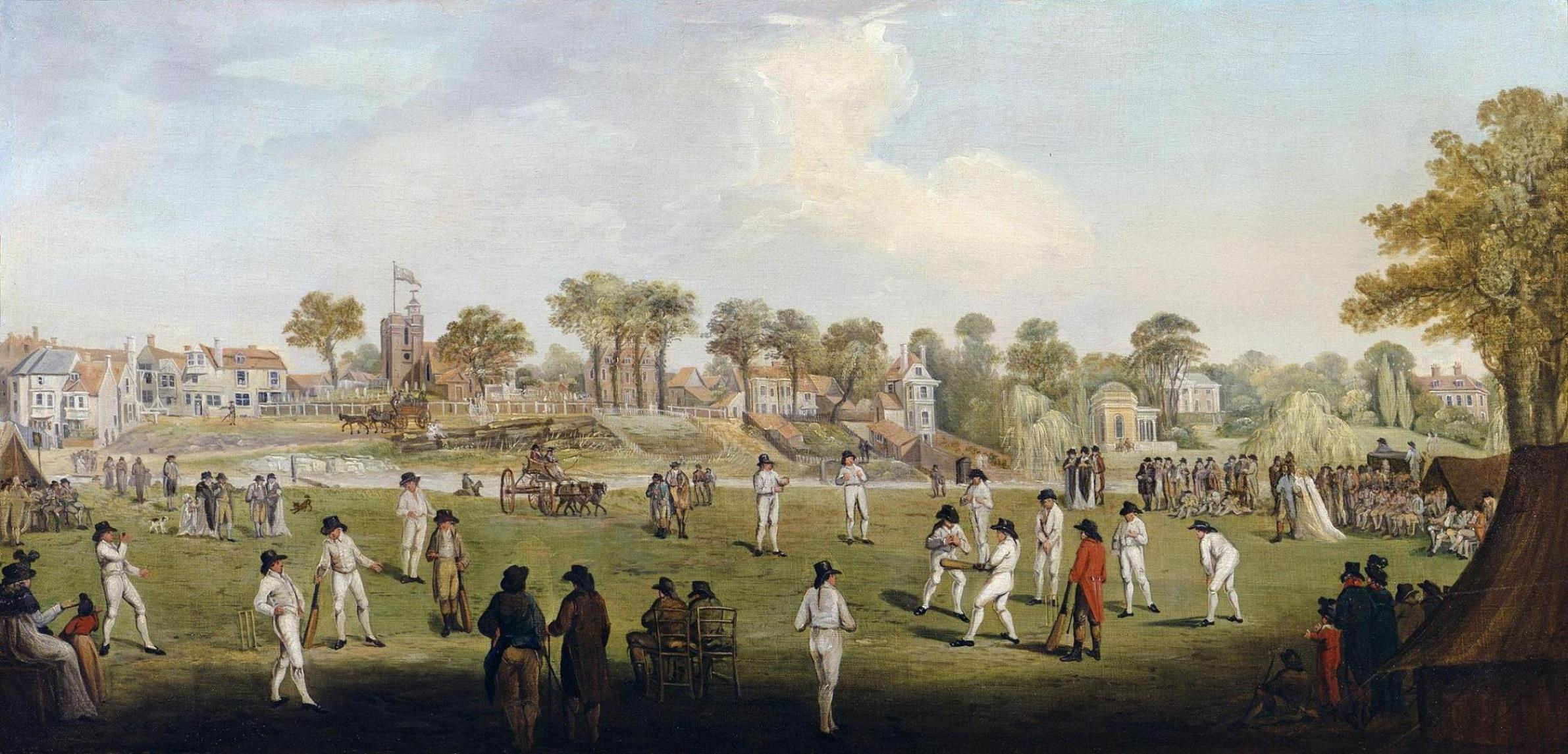
- A cricket match on Moulsey Hurst in 1790
- Interactive map of Moulsey Hurst cricket ground
- Location: West Molesey, Surrey
- Home club: Moulsey Hurst CC
- County club: Surrey
- Establishment: by 1726
- Last used: 1810

Moulsey Hurst is in West Molesey, Surrey on the south bank of the River Thames above Molesey Lock. It is one of England's oldest sporting venues and was used in the 18th and 19th centuries for cricket, prizefighting and other sports. This area is now called Hurst Park; the area currently called Molesey Hurst is smaller, and some 500m to the south.

The site can be reached from Hampton across the river by Hampton Ferry when it is running in the summer.

== Sporting venue ==
When James VI and I became King of England in 1603, he introduced the sport of golf to the country. The first games of golf in England were played at Molesey, in Westminster and Greenwich Park which were large open spaces near to royal palaces.

This venue is one of the oldest used for organised cricket. The earliest known use of the site for the game was in 1723 for a match between Surrey and London. One of cricket's most famous paintings is Cricket at Moulsey Hurst, by Richard Wilson in 1780. The painting is owned by Marylebone Cricket Club (MCC) and on display at Lord's.

It hosted for some decades Hurst Park horse race course, evinced by an 1872 Ordnance Survey map. The cricket ground probably remained in the centre of the racecourse, which was common practice in the 18th century. It was at this ground where the now modern-day East Molesey CC began; the current ground now lies off Graburn Way, about 1/3 mile (0.54 km) east and a short walk from Hampton Court Palace.

Molesey Hurst Golf Club (now defunct) was founded in 1907. The club disappeared at the onset of WW2.

Other sports and activities included ballooning, sprinting and archery. In May 1810, Dutch Sam defeated Ben Medley in front of a reported ten thousand spectators at Moulsey Hill.

== Moulsey Hurst today ==
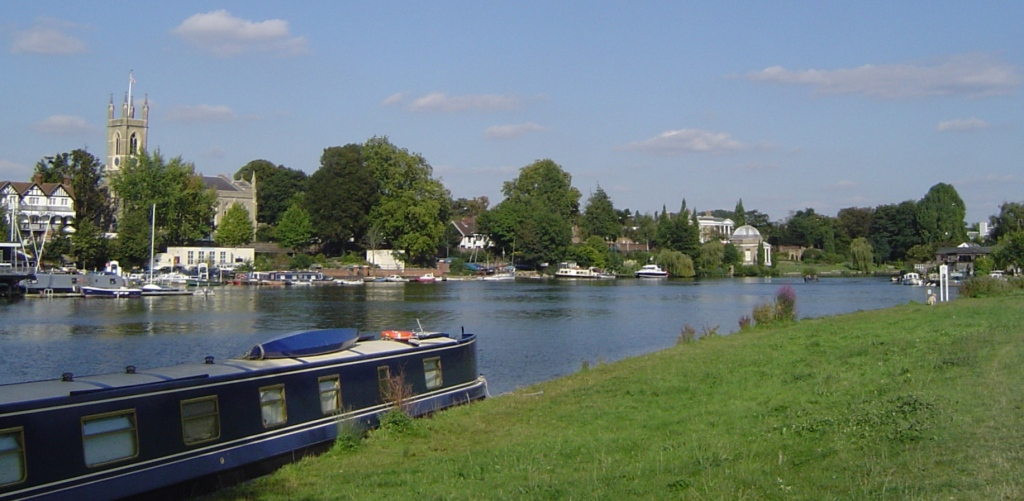
The Thames at Moulsey Hurst today

In 2004, Hurst Park Residents Association laid out a "heritage marker" close to the river, which contains a number of illustrations of the history and activities of the area.

== Chronology of events ==
- 871 – Vikings sailed up the Thames here to sack Chertsey Abbey
- 1723 – the earliest known use of the site for cricket: Surrey v. London
- 1733 – earliest known use of the site for an inter-county match when Surrey played Middlesex
- May 1785 – James Sadler made a hot air balloon ascent near here, accompanied by a member of parliament, about a year after the success of the Montgolfier Brothers balloon
- Autumn 1787 – a professional runner named Powell ran a mile in 4 minutes and 3 seconds at Moulsey Hurst in preparation for an attempt on the 4-minute mile
- August 1795 – in a cricket match at Moulsey Hurst, John Tufton was dismissed leg before wicket by John Wells, the first time the mode of dismissal is recorded.
- 1798 – a Mr Troward, a member of the Toxophilite Society, shot an arrow on a level piece of ground on Moulsey Hurst seventeen score, or 340 yards
- 1806 – last known use of Moulsey Hurst for an important match was Surrey v England.
- October 1808 – Tom Cribb fought Bob Gregson to determine the new English boxing champion. The fight resulted in a win for Cribb in 23 rounds.
