= Francis Towneley =

English Jacobite

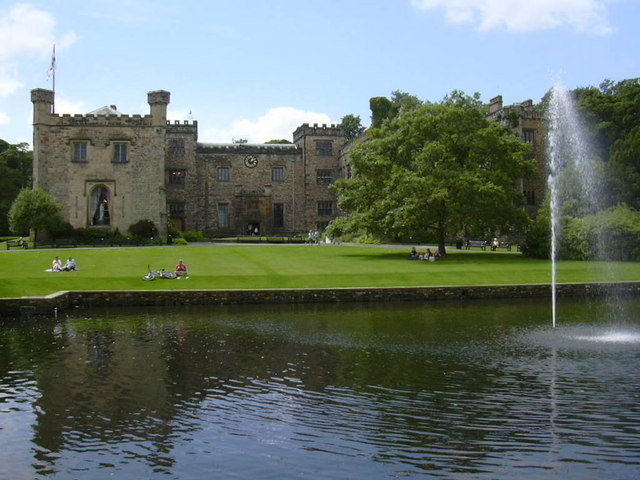
- Towneley Hall in Towneley Park, Burnley
- Born: 9 June 1709; Burnley
- Died: 30 July 1746 (aged 37); Kennington Common, London
- Burial place: St Pancras Old Church and Burnley, Lancashire
- Relatives: John Towneley (1696–1782)
- Military career
- Allegiance: France; Jacobites
- Service years: 1728–1734, 1745–1746
- Rank: Colonel
- Unit: Manchester Regiment
- Conflicts: War of the Polish Succession; Philippsburg; Jacobite Rising of 1745; Carlisle, December 1745

Francis Towneley (9 June 1709 – 30 July 1746) was an English Catholic and supporter of the exiled House of Stuart or Jacobite.

After service with the French army from 1728 to 1734, he returned to England and took part in the Jacobite Rising of 1745. He was appointed colonel of the Manchester Regiment, the only significant English formation to take part in the rebellion. Captured at Carlisle in December 1745, he was convicted of treason and executed at Kennington Common, London in July 1746.

== Early life ==
Francis Towneley was born on 9 June 1709, fifth and youngest surviving child of Ursula, daughter of Phillip Fermor of Tusmore, Oxfordshire, and Charles Towneley of Towneley Hall, Burnley, Lancashire. He had three brothers, Richard (1689-1735), John (1696-1782) and George, as well as a sister, Mary (1686-1712).

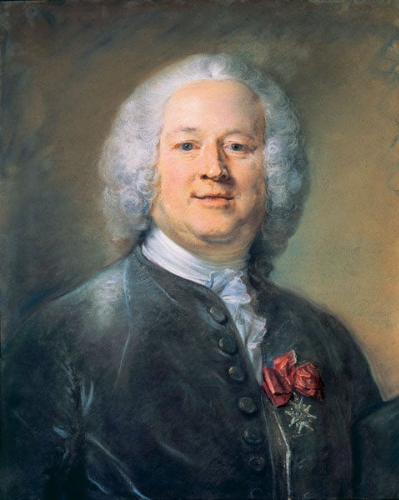
Francis Towneley's older brother John, who was also involved in the 1745 rising.

The Towneleys were prominent members of the Roman Catholic minority in Lancashire and their private chapel served as the focus of Catholic worship in the area until the building of a public church in 1846. Towneley Hall was occupied by Parliamentary forces during the First English Civil War; Charles Towneley (1604-1644) raised a Royalist infantry regiment and was killed at Marston Moor in 1644.

His grandfather Richard Towneley (1629-1707), was a scientist and astronomer, part of a close-knit group of Catholic scientific collaborators. Periods of anti-Catholic agitation before and after the 1688 Glorious Revolution, saw him fined and imprisoned, culminating in accusations of involvement in the 1694 Lancashire Plot, an alleged attempt to restore the exiled James II.

Francis' father died in 1711,; his eldest brother, also called Richard, was captured at Preston during the 1715 Rising but a jury acquitted him of treason in May 1716, although the trial involved the family in heavy expenses. While most Jacobite prisoners were eventually pardoned, one consequence was harsher treatment in 1745 for individuals or families viewed as repeat offenders, including Francis.

Like many English Catholics, Francis was educated at Douai and served in the French army from 1728 to 1734, acting as aide to the Duke of Berwick during the 1734 siege of Philippsburg. The northern Catholic gentry formed a small, tight-knit group, among them the Stricklands, who owned lands in Westmoreland and Yorkshire. His brother John spent time at the Jacobite court in Rome, and served as head of household for Henry Stuart in 1743. There he would have met Francis Strickland (1691-1746), one of the Seven Men of Moidart who accompanied Prince Charles to Scotland in 1745.

== Rebellion ==
Towneley returned to Britain sometime before 1743 and lived quietly in Wales. His French officer's commission was renewed in late 1744, which suggests he had been identified for a senior role in any invasion. Hearing of Charles' landing in north-west Scotland in August 1745, he traveled to Manchester, with two prominent Welsh Jacobites, David Morgan and William Vaughan. They met other Jacobite sympathisers at Didsbury, among them the poet John Byrom, who described Towneley as a "gallant soldier", devoted to the Stuart cause, but was shocked by his "profane swearing".

When the Jacobite army arrived on 28 November, Towneley and others formed the Manchester Regiment, the only significant English unit raised in 1745. Vaughan and many recruits were Catholic, including a group of 39 from Kirkham, Lancashire, but the gentry generally avoided involvement. Since 1721, Walpole's government pursued a policy of reconciling Catholics to the regime, while closely monitoring any of doubtful loyalty, and the Jacobites made little effort to raise them. Since most felt a Stuart monarch would do little to improve their status, joining the rebellion offered little gain for an enormous risk.

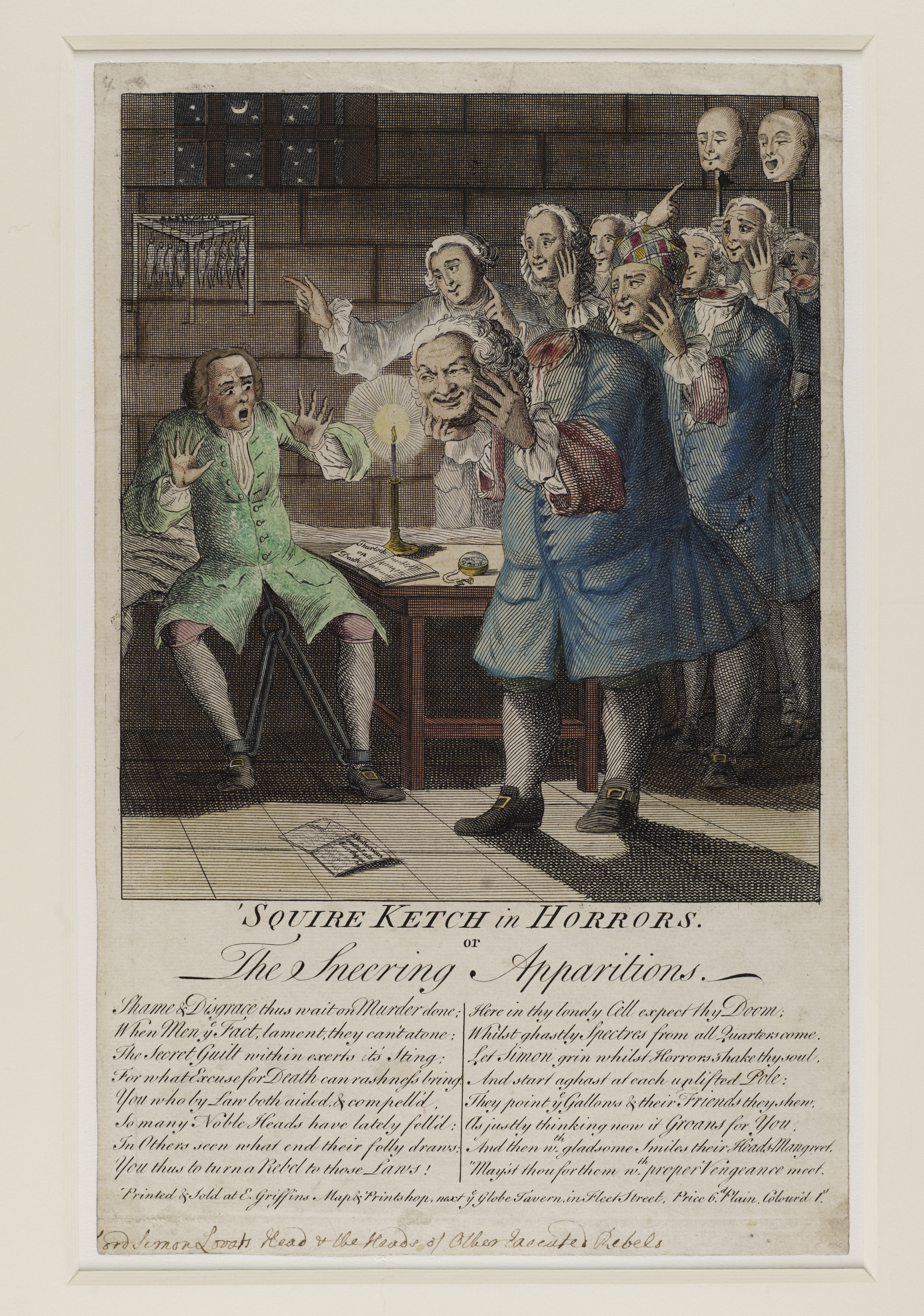
"Squire Ketch in Horrors", a pro-Jacobite satirical print of 1750. Executioner John Thrift is confronted by his Jacobite victims, including Lovat (front), Kilmarnock and Balmerino (immediately behind Lovat) and Towneley and Fletcher, their heads on spikes at the rear.

Towneley was appointed colonel on the recommendation of unofficial French envoy, the Marquis d’Éguilles, who knew his brother John. Although viewed favourably by Irish Jacobite Sir John MacDonald, this opinion was not universally shared; Towneley had a reputation for being hot-tempered and one of his officers, James Bradshaw, transferred to Lord Elcho's regiment as a result.

The unit was issued with weapons and ammunition at Macclesfield on 1 December but attempts to attract additional recruits were unsuccessful. The Scots had agreed to the invasion only when Charles promised they would receive widespread English support; there was no sign of this and at Derby on 5 December, they insisted on retreat. Morale among the English collapsed and while a few enlisted on the return from Derby, there were an increasing number of desertions.

By 19 December, the Jacobites had retreated as far as Carlisle, captured in November, which Charles wanted to retain, as a statement of his intention to return. With his remaining 115 men, Towneley volunteered to join the garrison of 200 under John Hamilton of Sandistoun, an officer from the Duke of Perth's Regiment. According to Adjutant-general O'Sullivan, his officers believed it was easily defensible and they could hold out for good terms. (Note: Besides there wou'd be no body sacrefised, if they had not surrendered as they did, for it was Mr Brown's & Maxfield's opinion (who served both of them twenty years in France) as well as Geohagans & Townly's, yt Cumberland cou'd not take the Castle with the Cannon he had, & the season we were in, in a Country where his Cavalry cou'd not subsist eight days) Given Cumberland wanted to execute those responsible for surrendering the castle in November, this was probably an accurate assessment.

However, when government forces reached Carlisle on 22 December, morale and supplies were low and most of the Jacobite officers considered defence futile. At Towneley's trial, a witness claimed he told Hamilton it was "better to die by the sword than fall into the hands of those damned Hanoverians". He was overruled by the others present and the castle surrendered on 30 December.

Two officers from Lallys escaped over the wall and made their way to Scotland; the other French-Irish regulars were treated as prisoners of war and later exchanged. The Manchesters were only granted their lives, subject to the "King's pleasure"; this meant they would receive a trial, rather than being summarily executed.

== Trial and execution ==
Along with Hamilton and other prisoners, Towneley was taken to London and held in Newgate Prison. He reportedly kept to himself and continued his quarrel with Hamilton, whom he referred to as a "Traitor on both Sides [...] to be despised by both Parties".

Claims to be treated as prisoners of war were carefully assessed by the authorities. Charles Radclyffe, de jure 5th Earl of Derwentwater and a captain in Dillon's Regiment, was captured with his eldest son en route to Scotland in 1745. Sentenced to death in 1715 before escaping, he was executed in December 1746 under the 1716 warrant, while James Radclyffe was released.

Towneley's reliance on his French commission was disallowed; he was tried on 13 July 1746, found guilty of treason and sentenced to be hanged, drawn and quartered, although by then it was customary to ensure the condemned were dead before being eviscerated. He was executed at Kennington Common on 30 July, along with eight officers from the Manchester Regiment; George Fletcher, David Morgan, Thomas Chadwick, Andrew Blood, John Berwick, Thomas Deacon, Thomas Syddall and James Dawson. He was said to have been calm and dignified, wearing a suit of black velvet made for the occasion.

His body was interred in the graveyard at St Pancras Old Church, one of the few places in London reserved for Catholic burials. Along with that of George Fletcher, his head was placed on a pike on Temple Bar; the journalist John Taylor reported that it was later removed by friends of his nephew Charles Townley. Author Katherine Grant, who is a direct descendant, states the relic was returned to his wife Mary and kept in the family chapel. In the 1930s, it was moved to Drummonds Bank in London, before being interred at St Peter's Church, Burnley in the late 1940s.

== Legacy in popular culture ==
Jacobites of the time used Towneley's name in a number of ballads, most notably 'Towneley's Ghost'. The 2007 children’s book How The Hangman Lost His Heart, although a work of fiction, uses the execution as a backdrop to the story.

== Sources ==
- Alger, John G; Braida, Antonella (1911). "Towneley, John". Oxford Dictionary of National Biography (2011 Online ed.). Oxford University Press. doi:10.1093/ref:odnb/27604. (Subscription, Wikipedia Library access or UK public library membership required.)
- Anonymous (1716). A Faithful Register of the Late Rebellion. Tom Warner, London.
- Catholic Record Society (1906). Miscellanea II. Catholic Record Society.
- Chambers, Robert (1827). History of the Rebellion of 1745–6. Forgotten Books.
- Clark, Jonathan (2012). Erskine-Hill, Howard (ed.). The Last Choices, 1775 to 1784 in The Politics of Samuel Johnson (Studies in Modern History). Palgrave. ISBN 978-0230355996.
- Espinasse, Francis (1877). Lancashire Worthies. Simpkin, Marshall & Co.
- Farrer, William; Brownbill, John, eds. (1911), The Victoria History of the County of Lancaster, vol. 6, Victoria County History - Constable & Co, OCLC 270761418
- Gooch, Leo (2006). "Towneley, Francis". Oxford Dictionary of National Biography (Online ed.). Oxford University Press. doi:10.1093/ref:odnb/27603. (Subscription, Wikipedia Library access or UK public library membership required.)
- Lonsdale, Enid (1961). "John Lunt and the 1694 Lancashire Plot" (PDF). Fylde Historical Society.
- Lysons, Daniel (1795). The Environs of London: Being an Historical Account of the Towns, Villages, and Hamlets, Within Twelve Miles of That Capital: Volume III (2018 ed.). Ecco. ISBN 978-1385312780.
- McCann, Jean E (1963). The Organisation of the Jacobite Army. PHD thesis Edinburgh University. hdl:1842/9381. OCLC 646764870.
- Monod, Paul Kleber (1993). Jacobitism and the English People, 1688–1788. Cambridge University Press. ISBN 978-0521447935.
- O'Sullivan, John (1938). Tayler, Alistair; Tayler, Henrietta (eds.). 1745 and after. Nelson.
- Oates, John (2010). "The Manchester Regiment of 1745". Society for Army Historical Research. 88 (354): 30–31. JSTOR 40177113.
- Oates, John (2006). "The Jacobite Invasion of 1745 in the North-West". Centre for North-West Regional Studies.
- Riding, Jacqueline (2016). Jacobites; A New History of the 45 Rebellion. Bloomsbury. ISBN 978-1408819128.
- Secombe, Thomas (1896). RADCLIFFE or RADCLYFFE, JAMES, third EARL OF DERWENTWATER. Oxford DNB. doi:10.1093/odnb/9780192683120.013.22983.
- Taylor, John (1833). Records of my Life. J & J Harper.
- Webster, C (1966). "Richard Towneley, the Towneley Group and 17th century science" (PDF). Transactions of the Historic Society of Lancashire and Cheshire.
- Wilkinson, W (1746). A compleat history of the trials of the rebel lords in Westminster-Hall, and the rebel officers and other concerned in the rebellion in the year 1745, at St. Margaret's-Hill, Southwark, and at Carlisle and York : with the lives, behaviour, and dying speeches of those executed pursuant to their sentences. London.
