= David Morgan (Jacobite) =

Welsh lawyer

David Morgan of Penygraig (c.1695 – 30 July 1746) was a Welsh lawyer and Jacobite, or supporter of the claim of the exiled House of Stuart to the British throne.

Morgan was notable as one of only a handful of Welshmen to join the Jacobite rising of 1745, during which he briefly served in Lord Elcho's 'Life Guards' and helped raise the Manchester Regiment. Unwilling to retreat to Scotland with the rest of the Jacobite Army, he was arrested by the government near Stone, Staffordshire, tried and executed in July 1746.

== Life ==
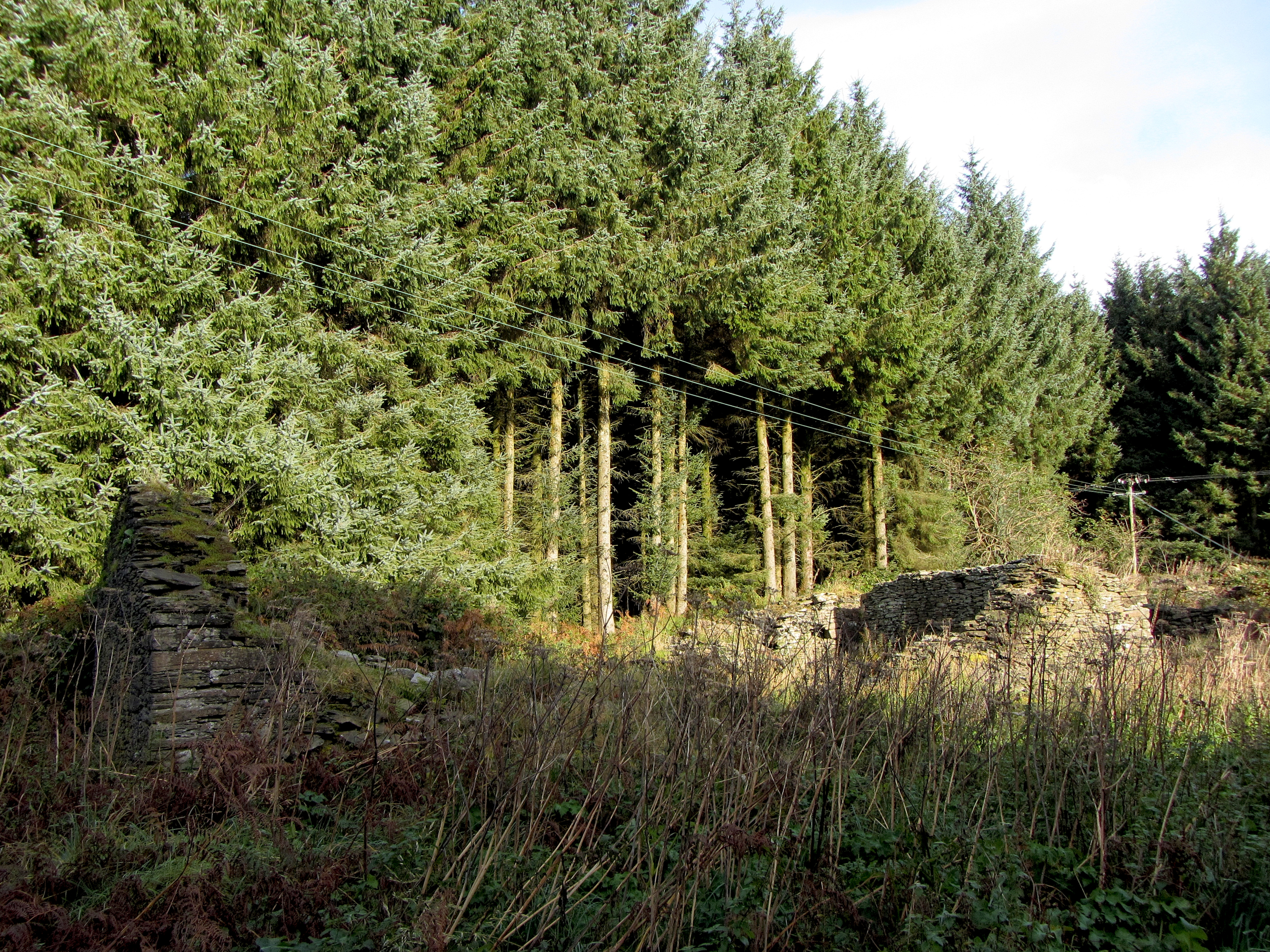
Remains of buildings at Penygraig, once owned by Morgan's family. In the late 19th century a window here was still pointed out as the "Counsellor's Room".

Morgan was born about 1695, probably in Glamorganshire. His family were of the small gentry class but were considered fairly well-connected; his father, Thomas Morgan, was the second son of landowner William Morgan of Coed-y-Gores and his mother Dorothy was the granddaughter of a baronet, Sir Edmund Stradling. On his mother's side Morgan was the first cousin of Admiral Thomas Mathews.

Details of Morgan's early life are obscure; he attended Christ Church, Oxford though did not graduate. He trained in law and was called to the bar in 1721 at the Middle Temple but although said to have been well known at Westminster, he seems to have spent much of his time at his father's estate of Penygraig, near present-day Edwardsville, Merthyr Tydfil. While some of his surviving poetry suggests he practised actively as a barrister on the Welsh circuit, he later claimed to have “never pretended to much knowledge that way”. He may have spent some time as an officer in the British Army; at his trial he said that he had “served the crown of England in two campaigns with some reputation”. Much of his income seems to have come from valuable leasehold property in Shoreditch that he acquired through his marriage.

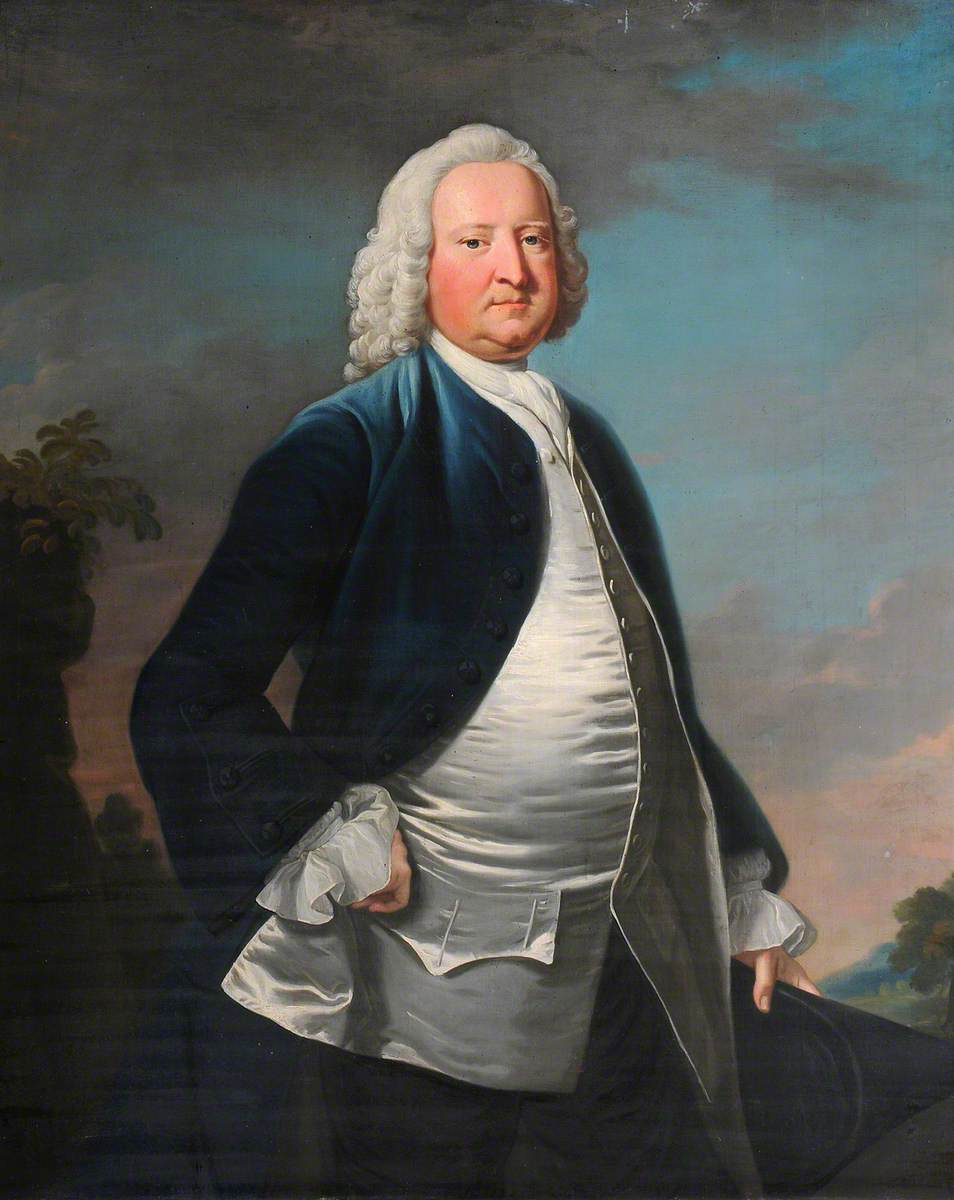
Sir Watkin Williams-Wynn of Wynnstay, Denbighshire, was the senior Welsh Jacobite; unlike Morgan he failed to commit to the 1745 rising

During the early part of the 18th century a number of Welsh gentry continued to support the claims of the exiled Stuarts. The most senior Welsh Jacobite was the powerful Tory landowner and MP Sir Watkin Williams-Wynn, 3rd Baronet; Wynn had indicated his support for a Stuart restoration on condition it was backed by French military support. His political club, the ‘Cycle of the White Rose’, was a focus for Jacobite activity in North Wales; a comparable role in South Wales was filled by the ‘Sea Serjeants’, led by Sir John Philipps.

Morgan himself was a friend of both Wynn and Philipps: he was closely associated with the circle of the Duke of Beaufort, another Tory with Jacobite sympathies, and was a prominent member of the “Independent Electors of Westminster”, a pro-Jacobite London club. He published several poems dealing with Jacobite themes, notably The Country Bard (1739).

== 1745 Rising ==
At the time the Stuart heir Charles Edward Stuart landed in Scotland in late July 1745, he was partly relying on French intelligence from 1743 that had suggested he would find strong support in Wales. While there is evidence of some latent support during 1745, the majority of the Welsh Tory gentry were horrified by the turn events had taken, which seemed to presage a bloody civil war rather than a Stuart restoration on the terms they had hoped for. Viewing the Rising primarily as a Scottish internal conflict, they felt Charles had aligned himself with “alien and barbarous Highlanders, rather than [...] a British political faction”. While Wynn was subjected to intense government scrutiny, he did no more than send the Jacobites equivocal verbal messages of support; in the event Morgan, along with the Catholic William Vaughan of Courtfield and his brother Richard, was one of the few Welshmen of the property owning class to join the Rising.

Morgan's own motives for joining appear to have been at least partly ideological, although he later admitted in a letter he might not have got involved had his "personal Affairs been more to [his] Liking". His surviving poetry and other writings focus on core High Tory themes such as indefeasible dynastic right, a ‘country’ attack on high taxation and on the standing army, while like many other senior Jacobites he was a 'High Church' nonjuring Anglican.

By tradition Morgan is supposed to have heard the news of Charles's landing through members of Philipps’ ‘Sea Serjeants’. He left Penygraig in early November and rode to Spetchley Park, Worcestershire, where he met William Vaughan; under the cover of a shooting trip, they travelled to northern England and along with Francis Towneley, a Lancashire Catholic, met the advancing Jacobite army near Preston on 27 November. At Manchester, around 200 English Jacobite volunteers were formed into the Manchester Regiment; while Morgan's Anglicanism and links with Beaufort made him a politically expedient candidate for colonel, the position was given to Towneley. Morgan was instead commissioned captain and was given responsibility for selection of the regiment's junior officers. He is also sometimes described as having been appointed as Charles's "counsellor" or legal advisor, but he denied this at his trial and seems to have served in a purely military capacity. One of his main duties was to organise the Jacobites' search for weapons.

Contrary to Charles's assurances, very few English recruits joined on the march towards London and at Derby on 5 December the Jacobite Council of War voted overwhelmingly to return and consolidate their position in Scotland. They debated and rejected the option of heading for Wales: a further message had been sent to Wynn as it was felt that the propaganda value of him joining would be high even if he brought no recruits, but the messenger was intercepted. Like Charles himself, Morgan felt the Council's decision had destroyed their best chance of success: he told Sir John MacDonald that "all was lost" and said to Vaughan that he would “rather be hanged than go to Scotland to starve”. While Vaughan stayed, Morgan left the army on the evening of 7 December at Ashbourne and headed southwards with a guide; he was arrested by government forces near Stone, Staffordshire.

The Jacobites continued northwards to Carlisle, where Towneley and the majority of the Manchester Regiment were left behind as a garrison; after a short siege they surrendered to Cumberland's government army on 30 December. Vaughan continued north with the main Jacobite force: after the Rising ended at Culloden in April 1746, he escaped the country.

== Trial and execution ==
Held at Newgate Prison along with other senior Jacobites, Morgan was eventually brought to trial on 18 July 1746; despite a “lengthy and ingenious defence” he was found guilty of treason and sentenced to be hanged, drawn and quartered.

He was executed on 30 July at Kennington Common alongside Towneley and several other officers of the Manchester Regiment. Morgan seemed unconcerned by his fate: several accounts noted him angrily complaining about the coffee the prisoners were served shortly before being taken to execution. At the scaffold he led the others in prayer for about thirty minutes and distributed copies of his dying speech. As with Towneley, Morgan's speech unapologetically restated 'Country party' or 'patriot' ideals, attacking the Hanoverians' "ungrateful avarice" and labelling them as foreign usurpers, arguing that "a lawful king is a nursing father who would protect us". After the execution his remains were probably buried in the burying ground attached to the Foundling Hospital, now St George's Gardens, Bloomsbury.

== Legacy ==
While Wynn continued his covert activities, and the Welsh Jacobite clubs lingered into the 19th century, Morgan's death and the inaction of Welsh Tories effectively signalled the end of Welsh Jacobitism. Nevertheless, like Towneley, Morgan for a time became a figure of inspiration for Jacobites elsewhere in Britain; his execution reinvigorated the Independent Electors of Westminster, of which he had been a member, and contributed to a rise in Jacobite activities after 1745.

Memories of figures such as Morgan and David Jenkins influenced later historians in assuming the rural Welsh gentry to have been ultra-royalists or "fanatical tories", even though this view was largely a "myth". Morgan also attracted some interest from the Welsh “Celticist” nationalists of Cymru Fydd: in 1901 the magazine Young Wales published a poem by W. Llewelyn Williams in which Morgan, awaiting execution, laments his cause's betrayal by Wynn and the other Welsh gentry to the “shame [of] / Our gallant country”. Another nationalist writer, Arthur Owen Vaughan or "Owen Rhoscomyl", used Morgan's story as the basis for an 1897 historical novel, For the White Rose of Arno.

== Family ==
Morgan was married; his wife was reported to have visited him regularly during his imprisonment. They had at least one daughter, Mary, who later inherited Morgan's properties and died unmarried prior to 1798.
