= John Towneley =

John Towneley may refer to:

- John Towneley (politician), English politician
- John Towneley (translator), translator of Hudibras into French

== See also ==
- John Townley, musician, astrologer, and naval historian
- John Wes Townley, American stock car racing driver
