= 68th Regiment of Foot (disambiguation) =

Two regiments of the British Army have been numbered the 68th Regiment of Foot:

- 68th Regiment of Foot (1745), or Bedford's Regiment, raised in 1745 and disbanded in 1746
- 68th (Durham) Regiment of Foot (Light Infantry), raised in 1756 and renumbered 1758.
