= Chevalier de Johnstone =

Jacobite army officer

James Johnstone, Chevalier de Johnstone
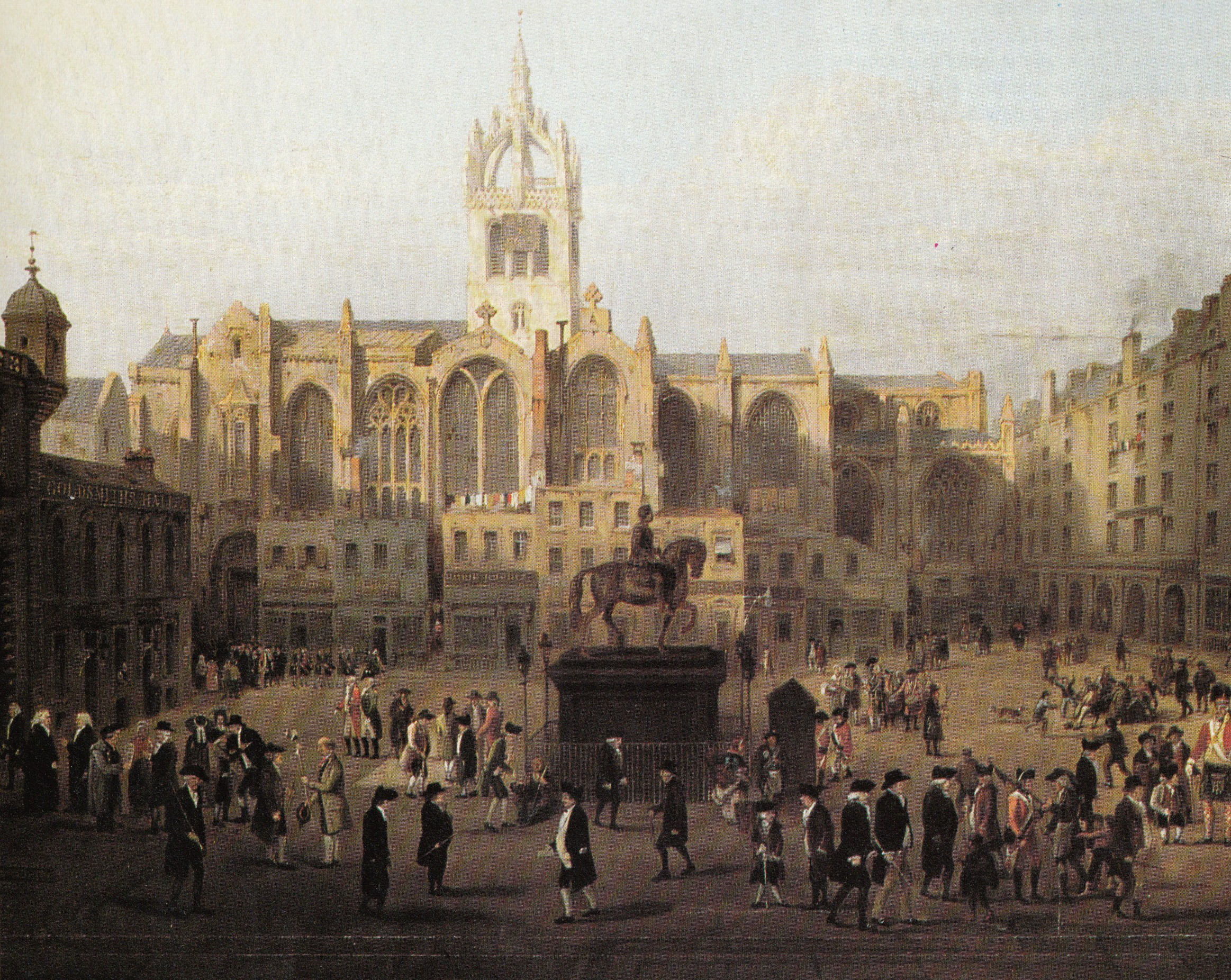
- Johnstone's home town of Edinburgh, c. 1770
- Born: 25 July 1719; Edinburgh
- Died: c. 1791; Paris
- Relatives: Lady Jane Douglas (c. 1698–1753); John, 6th Lord Rollo (1708–1783)
- Military career
- Allegiance: Great Britain 1719–1745; Jacobite 1745–1746; France 1746–1791
- Branch: French Colonial Army
- Service years: 1745–1746 and 1750–1760
- Rank: Lieutenant
- Nickname: Johnstone de Moffatt
- Unit: Compagnies Franches de la Marine 1750–1760
- Conflicts: Jacobite rising of 1745; Battle of Prestonpans; Battle of Falkirk Muir; Battle of Culloden; French and Indian War; Siege of Louisbourg; Battle of the Plains of Abraham
- Awards: Order of Saint Louis, 1761

James Johnstone (1719 – c. 1791), also known as Chevalier de Johnstone or Johnstone de Moffatt, was a Scottish memoirist who is best remembered for his Memoirs of the Rebellion in 1745 and 1746, first published in 1820. The son of an Edinburgh merchant, he escaped to France after participating in the 1745 Jacobite rebellion.

He was commissioned a lieutenant in the French Colonial Army, and served in French North America for several years. Following the loss of Quebec to the British Army in 1760, Johnstone returned to France and became a civilian. Little is known of his later life, and he is thought to have died sometime between 1791 and 1800.

== Family and early life ==
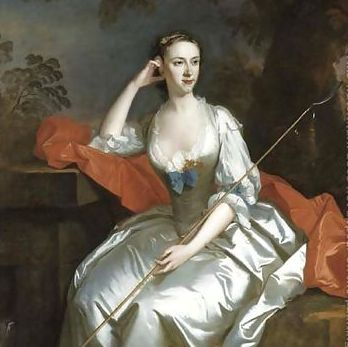
Lady Jane Douglas (c.1698–1753); a distant relative and family friend who helped Johnstone escape to France in 1746.

James Johnstone was born 25 July 1719, only son of Jeremy Boone Johnstone, an Edinburgh merchant; his mother was a distant relative of Lady Jane (or Jean) Douglas (c.1698–1753), later the centre of a famous inheritance case known as the Douglas Cause. He had two sisters; the elder, Cecilia (c.1715–1746), married John Rollo (1708–1783), later 6th Lord Rollo. His other sister, Jean, married Hugh Leslie of Dalkeith and their great-grandson purchased Johnstone's manuscripts in 1870. There is no record of Johnstone ever marrying or having children.

Little is known of Johnstone's childhood and youth. In his autobiography, he admitted to being a poor student who was "given to dissipation and extravagance". He had a difficult relationship with his father, but was indulged by his mother and Lady Jane, who lent him money.

In 1738, Johnstone persuaded his father to send him to Saint Petersburg, where he stayed with his mother's uncle, James Hewitt, an expatriate Scot and merchant. Another uncle, Gustav Otto Douglas (1687–1771), was a Russian general who was born in Sweden, but changed sides after being captured at Poltava in 1709. Douglas arranged a commission for Johnstone in the Russian military, but his father threatened to disinherit him if he accepted. After a period in London, he returned to Edinburgh in 1740.

His sister Cecilia's marriage into the Rollo family connected Johnstone to the circle of Jacobite gentry in Perthshire. This group is said to have supplied over 20% of the rebel army in the 1745 Rising. Robert, 4th Lord Rollo (1679–1758) had participated in the 1715 Rising, although his son Andrew Rollo (1703–1765) served with the British army in Flanders during the War of the Austrian Succession.

== Jacobite rebellion, 1745–1746 ==
Johnstone joined the Jacobites under Charles Edward Stuart when they reached Perth in early September 1745. He was appointed captain in the Duke of Perth's regiment. Although his claim to have been aide-de-camp to Lord George Murray cannot be verified, he was present throughout the campaign, and took part in the invasion of England. Perth ordered him to join the garrison left at Carlisle in December but he refused, saying he "would never be a victim by choice". At Culloden in April 1746, he allegedly took part in the attack on the government lines, before he escaped by taking someone else's horse.

He made his way to Ruthven Barracks with around 1,500 other survivors; on 20 April, Stuart ordered them to disperse until he returned from France with additional support. Johnstone accompanied Lord Ogilvy to Clova, in Angus, and then spent several weeks hiding in the Highlands until he could return to Edinburgh. His old friend Lady Jane Douglas helped him escape to London, where he watched members of the Jacobite Manchester Regiment being taken to Kennington Common for their execution on 30 July 1746. Disguised as one of Lady Jane's servants, he accompanied her to The Hague, where they parted.

== French Colonial Army ==
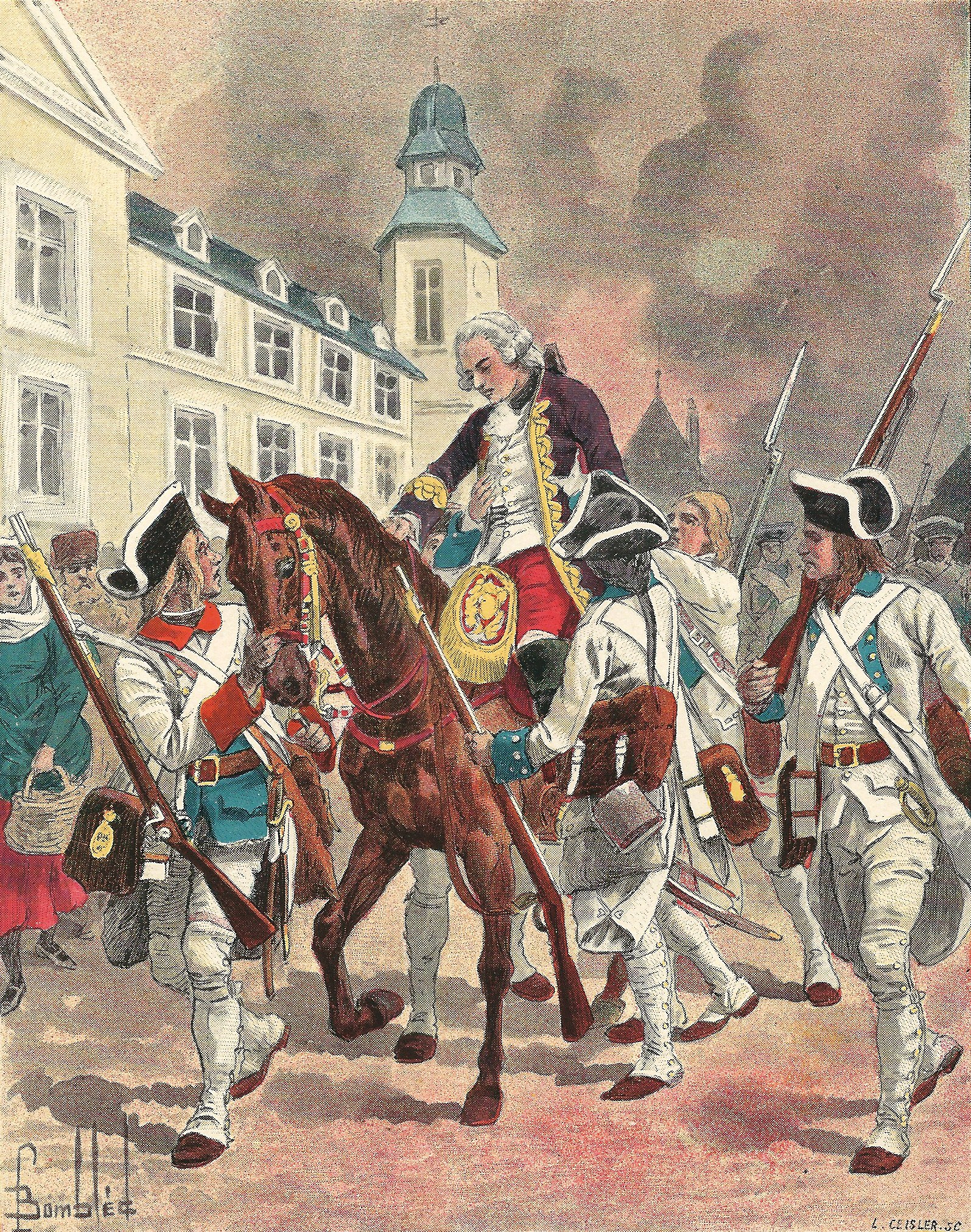
Johnstone served under Montcalm, shown here after being fatally wounded in the Battle of the Plains of Abraham.

Although he had originally intended to return to Russia, Johnstone stayed in Paris until Stuart was expelled from France after the 1748 Treaty of Aix-la-Chapelle. In 1750, a connection to the Marquis de Puisieulx, then French Foreign Minister led to his appointment as ensign in the Compagnies Franches de la Marine. These were regular troops raised for service in French North America, and Johnstone was posted to Île-Royale, Nova Scotia. A recurring theme of his Memoirs is his complaint of unfair treatment as he considered his rank an insult; however, when he arrived at Louisbourg in 1754, he was promoted lieutenant.

The colonial dispute between Britain and France, known as the French and Indian War, began in 1754. Two years later, it merged into the global Seven Years' War. When the British captured Louisbourg in June 1758, Johnstone was stationed on Prince Edward Island and escaped to Quebec. He served under General Montcalm, commander at Quebec until his death on 13 September in the Battle of the Plains of Abraham. Despite being recognised by the British as a Scot, Johnstone was allowed to return to France in October 1760.

The loss of North America resulted in the disbandment of the Compagnies and Johnstone's military career ended. He was paid a small pension and appointed to the Order of Saint Louis in 1762. Although the Memoirs often refer to his preference for a military life, his career had been undistinguished. There are few details of his life thereafter; he apparently visited Scotland in 1779 but seems to have had little contact with his family. The parlous state of French government finances resulted in his pension being reduced in the 1770s; it was stopped completely following the 1789 French Revolution but later restored.

While it is generally agreed he died in Paris, the date is uncertain; the Oxford Dictionary of National Biography suggests circa 1800. There is no record of him after 1791, which is used by the Dictionary of Canadian Biography and other sources.

== Manuscripts ==
Johnstone reportedly deposited his manuscripts in the Scots College, Paris, including Memoirs of the Rebellion in 1745 and 1746, translated into English and published in 1822. While full of complaints about the injustice of the world and often extremely self-centred, they are lively and include the occasional flash of insight. Like many, Johnstone disliked Charles Stuart. He was an admirer of Lord George Murray, but criticised him because Murray's talents were offset by a quick temper, arrogance, and inability to take advice.

Other works dealing with Johnstone's time in Canada were printed in Quebec in 1887: The Campaign of 1760 in Canada and A dialogue in Hades: a parallel of military errors, of which the French and English armies were guilty, during the campaign of 1759, in Canada.

== Sources ==
- Alger, J. G.; Carafano, James Jay (2004). "Johnstone, James [known as Chevalier de Johnstone]". Oxford Dictionary of National Biography (2006 ed.). Oxford University Press. doi:10.1093/ref:odnb/14963. (Subscription, Wikipedia Library access or UK public library membership required.)
- Crowley, T. A. (1979). Johnstone, James: Dictionary of Canadian Biography. Vol. IV. University of Toronto.
- Johnstone, James (1822). Memoirs of the Rebellion in 1745 and 1746 (2010 ed.). Kessinger Publishing. ISBN 978-1-163-445-27-3.
- McCann, Jean E. (1963) The Organisation of the Jacobite Army (PHD thesis) Edinburgh University, OCLC 646764870
- Riding, Jacqueline (2016). Jacobites: A New History of the 45 Rebellion. Bloomsbury. ISBN 978-1-408-819-12-8.
- Wills, Rebecca (2001). The Jacobites and Russia, 1715-1750. Tuckwell Press. ISBN 978-1-862-321-42-7.
