= Blood Red Horse =

2004 novel

- Puffin Books edition, 2004
- Author: K M Grant
- Language: English
- Series: De Granville Trilogy
- Genre: Historical fiction
- Publisher: Puffin Books
- Publication date: 2004
- Publication place: United Kingdom
- Media type: Print
- Pages: 277 pp
- ISBN: 0802789609
- OCLC: 58386374
- Followed by: Green Jasper

Blood Red Horse is a 2004 young adult historical novel by author K M Grant. The book was published in 2004 by Puffin Books and Walker Children's. Blood Red Horse is the first novel in the De Granville Trilogy and was followed by the books Green Jasper and Blaze of Silver.

In 2006 the audiobook version of Blood Red Horse won an AudioFile Earphones Award and in 2007 was one of YALSA's recommended audiobooks for 2007.

== Plot summary ==
Blood Red Horse follows Will and Ellie, two young teens growing up during the time of the Crusades. Ellie has feelings for Will, yet has been promised in marriage to Will's brother Gavin. When King Richard announces that he will launch a Crusade, both Will and Gavin are sent off to fight. Will chooses the scrawny Hosanna to ride into battle, drawn in by the horse's allure. Along with his horse, Gavin doesn't want Will to find a way to survive the battle and return home.

== Reception ==
Critical reception for the book has been mostly positive, with the School Library Journal praising the audiobook's narration. The Guardian cited the factual detail in the battle scenes as a highlight, calling the overall book "soundly researched" and "well-structured". Kirkus Reviews gave a negative review, criticizing Blood Red Horse as "overblown and under-plotted".
