= St George's Gardens =

Public park in King's Cross, London

Coordinates: 51.526°N 0.121°W

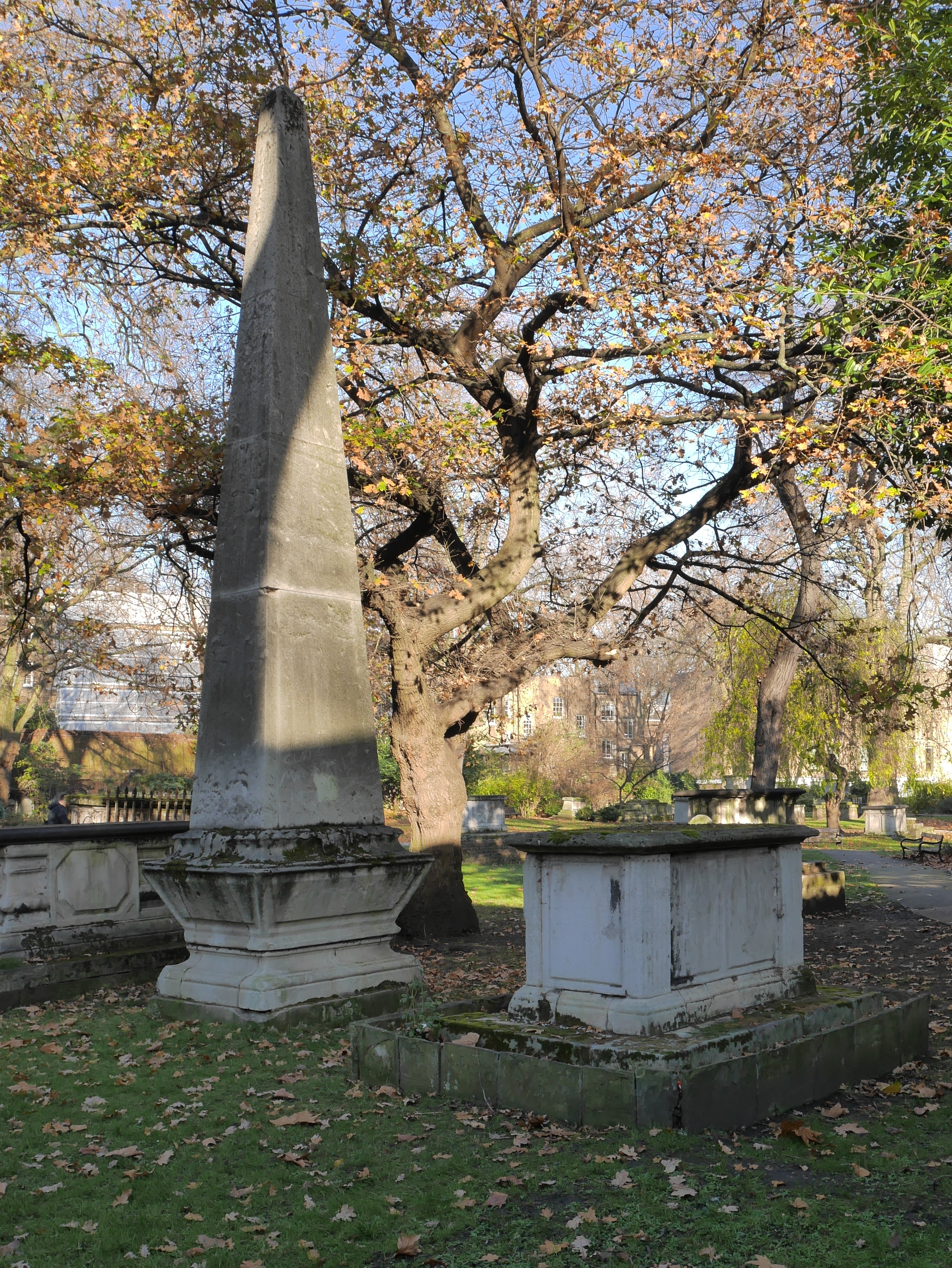
Monuments in St George's Gardens

St George's Gardens is a public park in the King's Cross area of the former parish and borough of St Pancras, in the London Borough of Camden.

== History ==
Its land was originally bought in 1713 to provide a joint burial ground for St George's Bloomsbury and St George the Martyr, Holborn; however the site chosen was in neither Bloomsbury or Holborn as there was no suitable site available in either of those areas. Instead, the parishes sited their burial ground in the parish of St Pancras. This was one of the first burial grounds in London to be sited away from the church or churches it served.

The burial ground was formerly known as Nelson's Burial Ground after a "Pious and learned writer" Robert Nelson (1665-1715) who was the first to be buried there. The burial ground closed due to overcrowding in 1855, reopening as a public garden around 1885.

It was Grade II* listed on 1 October 1987.

Eight officers of the Jacobite Manchester Regiment who were captured in the 1745 Rising, condemned as rebels and executed at Kennington Common in 1746, were buried in St George's Gardens, where a plaque was erected by the 1745 Association in 2015.
