= Siege of Carlisle (November 1745) =

1745 military action

Coordinates: 54.895°N 2.934°W

First siege of Carlisle
- Part of the Jacobite rising of 1745
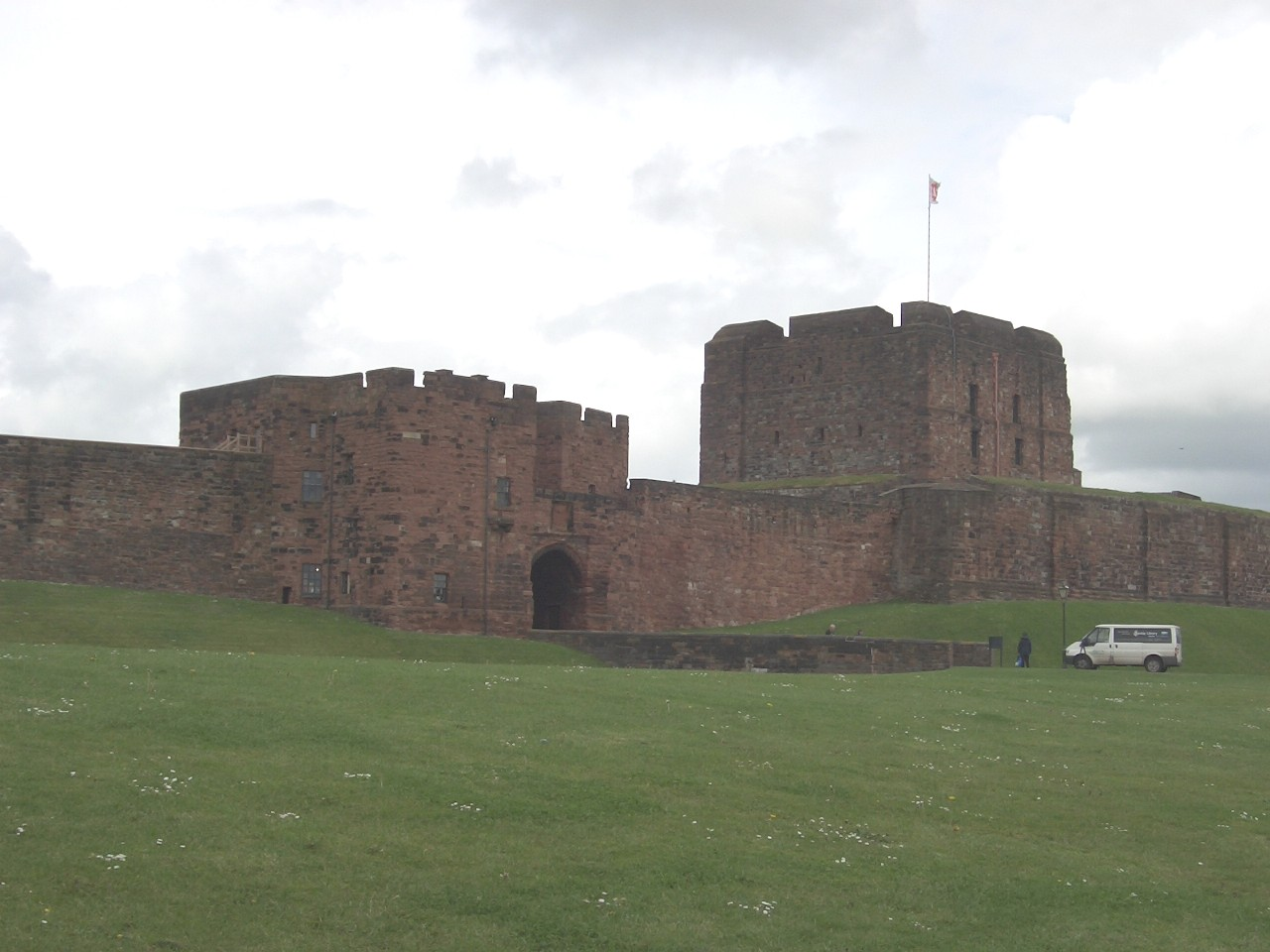
- A present-day view of Carlisle Castle
| Date | 13–15 November 1745 |
| Location | Carlisle, England, Great Britain |
| Result | Jacobite victory |

Belligerents
| Jacobites | (Kingdom of Great Britain) Britain |

Commanders and leaders
| Charles Stuart | Colonel Durand |

Strength
| Unknown | Unknown |

Casualties and losses
| Unknown | Unknown |

The first siege of Carlisle was an important event of the 1745–1746 Jacobite rising. Jacobite forces loyal to Prince Charles Edward Stuart captured the city of Carlisle and Carlisle Castle on 14–15 November 1745.

== Background ==
Jacobite leader Charles Edward Stuart had received intelligence that the British commander General George Wade was advancing with British forces from Newcastle to relieve Carlisle and that he had already arrived in Hexham. Charles Stuart had decided to meet and attack him on hilly grounds between Newcastle and Carlisle. Leaving a sufficient force to blockade Carlisle he departed with the remainder of his army on the morning of 11 November 1745.

Stuart reached Brampton at about ten o'clock and despatched a party of horse led by a Colonel in the direction of Hexham to reconnoitre and order his men to take up quarters for the night. The Colonel returned with news that General George Wade's march to Hexham had been false. Charles waited at Brampton for two days without hearing anything of Wade. A council of war was then held at which several opinions were offered. One opinion was that Charles should march to Newcastle and give battle to Wade. Some of the council thought that this would be a dangerous move, because even if they were to defeat Wade his army might take refuge in Newcastle which it was vain for them to think of taking. Other opinions included returning to Scotland until they were joined by a greater body of Jacobite allies.

Lord George Murray was a respected Jacobite commander whose father, the Duke of Atholl (chief of Clan Murray) in fact supported the British Government. Lord George opposed all of these views and proposed that half of their force should stay at Brampton while the other half besieged Carlisle. James Drummond, 3rd Duke of Perth supported Murray's opinion and offered to take charge of the force to attack Carlisle if Murray took command of the blockade. The attacking party left the main body of the Jacobite army in Brampton, cutting down wood in Corby and Warwick parks to make scaling ladders and carriages.

== Siege ==
On 13 November at about noon, the regiments appointed for the blockade and siege of the city of Carlisle appeared before it. Lord George Murray took up his quarters at Harbery and posted his men in the villages around the city to stop all communication with it. The besieging party broke ground during the evening within musket shot of the city walls. The city's garrison constantly fired upon the attacking force but as the Jacobites were operating under the shroud of night they received no injuries. The Jacobites soon brought up all of their cannon which consisted of thirteen pieces to attack the town with. The following morning on the 14th the defenders continued their fire with little effect and the Jacobite besiegers, instead of returning fire held up their bonnets on the end of their spades in derision. According to the Chevalier de Johnstone, the Jacobites held their fire in case the defenders found out how small was the calibre of their guns.

Alarmed by the preparations of the Jacobites and the state of affairs within the city a meeting of the English inhabitants was held and it was decided to surrender the town. For seven days the inhabitants of the town were kept in constant alarm by the Jacobites' presence in Brampton followed by the siege. Many of the inhabitants refused to defend the town due to illness and many numbers of them were leaving by slipping over the walls. A white flag was exhibited from the walls and a messenger was despatched to the Duke of Perth to request terms. However, Prince Charles refused to grant any terms to the city unless Carlisle Castle was surrendered as well.

Colonel Durand, the commander of the castle, agreed to surrender the fortress along with the town. The conditions were, that the liberties and properties of the inhabitants, and all the privileges of the town, should be preserved inviolate; – that both garrisons on taking an oath not to serve against the house of Stuart for one year, should be allowed to retire, – and that all the arms and ammunition in the castle and the city, and all the horses belonging to the militia, should be delivered up to the prince. This capitulation was signed by the Duke of Perth and Colonel Durand on the night of 14 November 1745.

The next morning of the 15th, the Duke of Perth, James Drummond entered the city at the head of his regiment and was followed by other regiments at one o'clock in the afternoon. Carlisle Castle however was not given up until the next morning. The Duke of Perth shook hands with the men of the garrison, told them they were brave fellows, and offered them a large bounty to enlist in the service of the prince. The mayor and his attendants went to Brampton, and delivered the keys of the city to the prince. The Duke found 1,000 stand of arms in the castle, besides those of the militia. He also found 200 good horses in the city, and a large quantity of valuable effects in the castle, which had been lodged there by the gentry of the neighbourhood for safety.

== Aftermath ==
On the day following the surrender, the Chevalier de St. George was proclaimed in the city with the usual formalities; and, to give greater éclat to the ceremony, the mayor and aldermen were compelled to attend with the sword and mace carried before them. Along with the manifestos formerly noticed, another declaration for England, dates from Rome, 23d December, 1743, was also read, or much the same tenor as the others. After the Chevalier had been proclaimed, and the different manifestos read, the corporation went out to meet the prince, who entered the city under a general salute of artillery.

To many points of view the capture of Carlisle would have been of great importance to Prince Charles Edward Stuart, if he had been strong enough to have availed himself of the state of terror which that event, and his subsequent advance into the very heart of England, had thrown the people of that kingdom; but his means were soon found quite inadequate to accomplish his end. Even if his resources had been much greater than ever they were, it seems doubtful whether the jealousies and dissensions, which, at an early period, began to distract his councils, would not have rendered all his exertions, for obtaining the great object of his ambition, unavailable.

During the retreat of Charles Edward Stuart's Jacobites in 1746 he ordered that the Manchester Regiment be left to garrison Carlisle so that he "continued to hold at least one town in England". The Government army under Cumberland then besieged and took Carlisle. Today it still houses the King's Own Royal Border Regiment.

== See also ==
- Charles Edward Stuart
- Jacobite risings
- Carlisle Castle
- Second siege of Carlisle (December 1745)
