= Manchester Regiment (Jacobite) =

The Manchester Regiment
- Jacobite Standard of 1745
- Active: 1745–1746
- Country: Jacobite
- Type: Infantry
- Size: One battalion, maximum 300 men
- Engagements: 1745 Jacobite Rising; Clifton Moor Skirmish; 2nd Siege of Carlisle

Commanders
- Colonel of the Regiment: Francis Towneley

The Manchester Regiment was a Jacobite unit raised during the 1745 Rebellion and the only significant number of English recruits willing to fight for Charles Edward Stuart in his attempt to regain the British throne for his father. Raised in late November 1745, the majority were captured in December at Carlisle; eleven officers and sixteen members of the rank and file were executed in 1746, over a quarter of all those executed for their role in the Rising.

== Background ==
In July 1745, Charles landed in Scotland; by the end of September, he had captured Edinburgh and defeated a government army at the Battle of Prestonpans. After intense debate, in early November a Jacobite army of around 5,000 crossed into England, where Charles believed there was strong support for a Stuart restoration.

On 10 November, the Jacobite army reached Carlisle, which capitulated five days later; leaving a small garrison behind, they continued south to Preston on 26 November, then Manchester on 28th. Despite large crowds, they attracted few recruits; Preston, a Jacobite stronghold in 1715, supplied only three.

Manchester proved the exception; one suggestion was its lack of borough status or equivalent civic structure, which hampered the ability of government institutions to respond. In 1724, William Stukeley had described Manchester as "the largest, most rich, populous, and busy village in England". By 1745, it was also one of a handful of English towns with a significant non-juring congregation, many of whom were sympathetic to the Stuarts.

== Formation ==
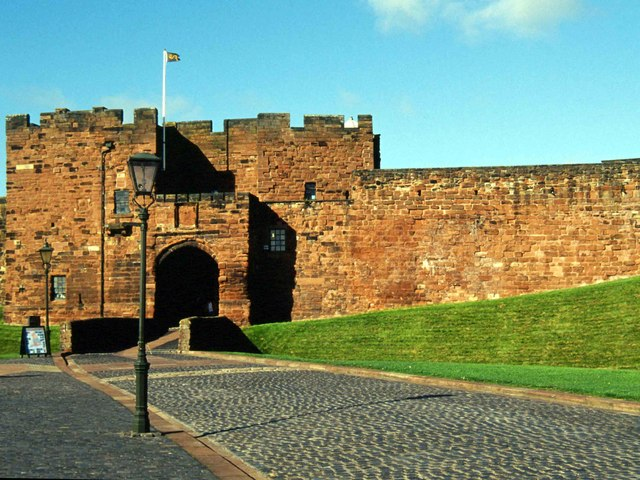
Carlisle Castle; garrisoned by the regiment in December 1745

The nucleus was provided by English officers and men from the Duke of Perth's Regiment, plus 39 Catholics recruited by John Daniel, of Kirkham, Lancashire. Provisionally titled the "English Regiment," it was subsequently renamed "Manchester" to "please and content the town".

Lancashire Catholic Francis Towneley was appointed colonel on the recommendation of the Marquis d’Éguilles, who was acquainted with his brother John. Towneley served with the French army from 1728 to 1736 and was viewed favourably by Irish Jacobite Sir John MacDonald, an opinion not universally shared. He had a reputation for being hot-tempered and one officer, James Bradshaw, later transferred to Lord Elcho's regiment as a result.

William Vaughan, a Herefordshire Catholic from the same social class as Towneley, was made lieutenant-colonel, with approval of the junior officers delegated to David Morgan. They included Tom Syddall, a barber whose father was executed after 1715, James Dawson, a former student of Cambridge University, John Berwick, a linen draper, plus three sons of Thomas Deacon, Charles, Robert and Thomas Theodorus.

A member of the non-juring church, Deacon was also a Jacobite sympathiser, who wrote the final speeches for John Hall and William Paul, executed after the 1715 Rising. Charles Deacon was appointed secretary, signing up recruits at the Bull's Head; many came from surrounding villages and it was later claimed no more than 28 were from Manchester itself. Excluding those drafted from existing units, the number of new recruits was estimated as around 200, considerably less than hoped. One reason was the relatively low status of the captains, normally responsible for recruiting; social standing was needed to attract men, then money to equip and pay them in advance.

O'Sullivan and others attributed the lack of enthusiasm to the absence of French regulars; while this undoubtedly played a part, it also reflected the post-1715 decline in English Jacobite support. Although some Scots and English observers dismissed the rank and file as "men of desperate fortunes", "common fellows" and "200 vagabonds", they represented a fairly typical cross-section of tradesmen, agricultural workers and those employed in the weaving industry. The majority were in their late teens and early twenties, with a relatively high proportion of Catholics.

According to a witness, the regimental colours had the words "Liberty" and "Property" on one side, "Church" and "Country" on the other, and may have incorporated the St George's Cross, while recruits were initially given blue and white ribbons as an identifying badge. They are supposed to have received blue coats and tartan sashes, although this seems unlikely for a unit that existed for little more than a month; the town constable in Derby recorded "about 56 Lankashire persons (wearing) a Sash of Pladd", which may have been a generalised Jacobite identifier.

== Service ==
Some received weapons and ammunition at Macclesfield on 1 December, but were barely trained in their use; a pioneer company under Captain Andrew Blood was used for road-mending. The Scots agreed to the invasion only when Charles promised they would receive widespread English support; there was no sign of this and at Derby on 5 December, they insisted on retreat. Morale among the English recruits collapsed, and while a few enlisted on the return from Derby, they were not nearly enough to compensate for the desertions. Bradshaw's company may have been involved in the skirmishes at Clifton Moor on 18 December, where "one Ogden, of Manchester" was reportedly taken prisoner.

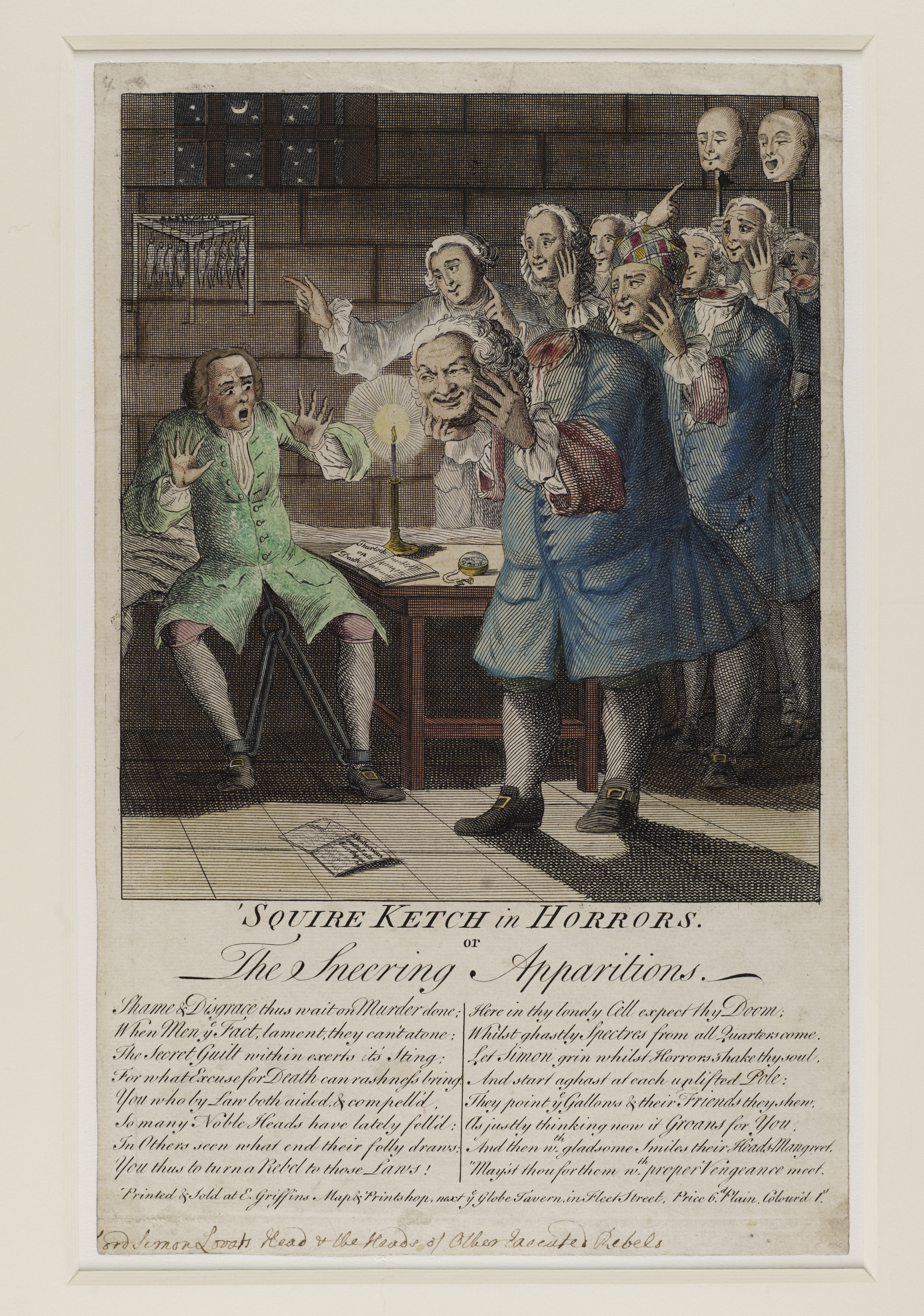
Cartoon; the public executioner visited by his victims, including Towneley and others from the Manchester Regiment

On 19 December, the Jacobites re-entered Carlisle, captured in November; Charles wanted it held, as a statement of his intention to return. Towneley was appointed town commander, with a garrison of the Manchester Regiment, now reduced to around 115 men, plus 200 others, including a contingent from the Irish Brigade. Many considered it suicidal, and Towneley claimed he volunteered only because it was his duty to do so. He may have hoped the presence of the French-Irish regulars meant they might be treated as prisoners of war, rather than rebels.

A small detachment continued with the Jacobite artillery, along with James Bradshaw, and fought at the Battle of Culloden in April. Government forces reached Carlisle on 22 December, and the castle was surrendered on 30th by its governor, Colonel John Hamilton. Most officers thought further resistance futile; Towneley and Dawson later claimed they wanted to fight on, but were overruled. The majority of the garrison's officers agreed to seek terms for a capitulation but the English officers were less keen. At least two officers managed to escape after the capitulation was agreed, with a Scots officer, James Nicolson, recaptured a day later.

Men from the Irish Brigade were treated as prisoners of war, but the Manchesters were considered rebels. The Duke of Cumberland granted their lives, subject to the "King's pleasure", which meant they received a trial. On 31 July 1746, Towneley was executed at Kennington Common, in South London, along with Blood, Dawson, Fletcher, Morgan, Syddall, Berwick, Chadwick, and Thomas Theodorus Deacon. Captured at Culloden, Bradshaw was executed on 28 November.

All were hanged, drawn and quartered, although by then it was common to ensure they were dead before being eviscerated. Towneley was buried in St Pancras Old Church, one of the few Catholic graveyards in London. The other nine were buried in St George's Gardens, Bloomsbury, where a plaque was erected by the 1745 Association in 2015.

Over a quarter of those executed for their role in the Rising were members of the regiment, including sixteen members of the rank and file. Others were transported or pardoned in return for enlisting in the British Army; a few escaped, among them John Holker, who later used his knowledge of Manchester industrial technology to establish a business in France.

== Sources ==
- Baker-Smith, Veronica. Royal Discord: The Family of George II. Athena Press, 2008.
- Chambers, Robert (1827). History of the Rebellion of 1745–1746. Forgotten Books.
- Duffy, Christopher. The '45: Bonnie Prince Charlies and the Untold Story of the Jacobite Rising. Cassell, 2003.
- Hibbert, Samuel (1848). The Episcopal See of Manchester, Volume II. Manchester: Thomas Agnew.
- de Dromantin, Patricia Clark (2010). "The Influence of the Jacobites on the Economic Development of France in the Era of the Enlightment". In Monod, P.; Szechi, M.; Pittock, D. (eds.). Loyalty and Identity: Jacobites at Home and Abroad. Palgrave Macmillan. ISBN 978-0230222571.
- Earwalker, J.P, ed. (June 1875). Local Gleanings Relating to Lancashire and Cheshire. Vol. 1. Manchester: J. E. Cornish.
- Lysons, Daniel (1795). The Environs of London: Being an Historical Account of the Towns, Villages, and Hamlets, Within Twelve Miles of That Capital: Volume III (2018 ed.). Ecco. ISBN 978-1385312780.
- Oates, John (2010). "The Manchester Regiment of 1745". Society for Army Historical Research. 88 (354). JSTOR 40177113.;
- Pollard, Tony (2009). Culloden: The History and Archaeology of the last Clan Battle. Pen and Sword. ISBN 978-1848840201.
- Reid, Stuart (2006). The Scottish Jacobite Army 1745-46. Osprey. ISBN 978-1846030734.
- Riding, Jacqueline (2016). Jacobites; A New History of the 45 Rebellion. Bloomsbury. ISBN 978-1408819128.
- Robb, Steven (2023). James Nicolson, a Leith Jacobite Martyr. Book of the Old Edinburgh Club Vol 19. ISBN 978-0-9933987-8-0.
- Sankey, Margaret (2005). Jacobite Prisoners of the 1715 Rebellion: Preventing and Punishing Insurrection in Early Hanoverian Britain. Routledge. ISBN 978-0754636311.
- Seton, Sir Bruce Gordon; Arnot, Jean (1928). The Prisoners of the '45, v.1. Scottish History Society.
- Stephen, Jeffrey (January 2010). "Scottish Nationalism and Stuart Unionism: The Edinburgh Council, 1745". Journal of British Studies. 49 (1, Scotland Special Issue): 47–72. doi:10.1086/644534. JSTOR 27752690. S2CID 144730991.
- Steuart, Francis (1891). "Some Notes on the Attainted Jacobites, 1746". The Scottish Antiquary, or, Northern Notes and Queries. 6 (21): 27–30. JSTOR 25516410.
- Szechi, Daniel (1994). The Jacobites: Britain and Europe, 1688–1788 (First ed.). Manchester University Press. ISBN 978-0719037740.
- Yates, Nigel (2017). Eighteenth-century Britain: Religion and Politics, 1715-1815. Routledge. ISBN 978-1138154346.
