= 68th Regiment of Foot (1745) =

- Active: 1745–1746
- Country: Kingdom of Great Britain
- Branch: British Army
- Type: Infantry
- Engagements: Jacobite rising of 1745

Commanders
- Colonel of the Regiment: John Russell, 4th Duke of Bedford

The 68th Regiment of Foot, or Bedford's Regiment, was a regiment in the British Army from 1745 to 1746.

== History ==
In response to the Jacobite rising of 1745, the regiment was raised in Bedfordshire by John Russell, 4th Duke of Bedford. It was the first of the new provincial regiments to be declared half-complete, on October 10. It received the rank 68th.

On November 30, the Duke of Cumberland reviewed the regiment and was disappointed, writing to the Duke of Newcastle: "‘I am sorry to speak my fears that they will rather be a hindrance than a service to me, for this regiment was represented to be the most forward regiment of them, yet neither officers nor men know what they are about, so how they will do before an enemy God alone knows." As of December 14, it mustered 764 NCOs and privates for an authorized strength of 780.

The Duke of Bedford, as colonel of the regiment, personally led his men but an attack of gout prevented him from marching north with them.

In December, the regiment was part of Cumberland's Army that successfully besieged Carlisle. It was then used to garrison Newcastle upon Tyne.

From June, the 68th Foot continued its mission by guarding Jacobite prisoners. It was disbanded at Bedford in the second half of August.

== Uniform ==
Most of the regiment raised by noblemen in 1745 had blue coats and red facings.
