= John Towneley (translator) =

English gentleman and translator

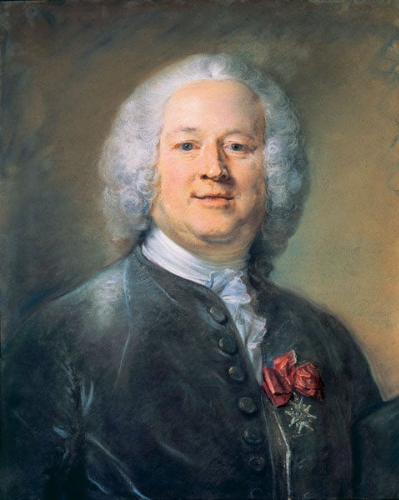
- Portrait by Jean-Baptiste Perronneau; Towneley is wearing the Order of Saint Louis
- Born: 1697; Burnley, Lancashire
- Died: 1782 (aged 84–85); Chiswick, London
- Burial place: Chiswick churchyard, London
- Military career
- Allegiance: France; Jacobites
- Service years: 1731–1746
- Conflicts: War of the Polish Succession; Jacobite Rising of 1745
- Awards: Order of Saint Louis

John Towneley (1697–1782) was an English gentleman from a Roman Catholic family, who served in the French Royal Army and supported the Jacobite Rising of 1745. Living in Paris for around 30 years, he also translated Hudibras into French.

== Early life ==
John Towneley was born in 1697 at Towneley Hall, Burnley, Lancashire, second surviving son of Charles Towneley and Ursula, daughter of Richard Fermor of Tusmore, Oxfordshire. (Note: Although Towneley's entry in the Dictionary of National Biography specifies that he was the second son, other sources say that he was the third.)

The Towneleys were prominent members of the Roman Catholic minority in Lancashire and their private chapel served as the focus of Catholic worship in the area until the building of a public church in 1846. Towneley Hall was occupied by Parliamentary forces during the First English Civil War; Charles Towneley (1604-1644) raised a Royalist infantry regiment and was killed at Marston Moor in 1644.

His grandfather Richard Towneley (1629-1707), was a scientist and astronomer, part of a close-knit group of Catholic scientific collaborators. Periods of anti-Catholic agitation before and after the 1688 Glorious Revolution, saw him fined and imprisoned, culminating in accusations of involvement in the 1694 Lancashire Plot, an alleged attempt to restore the exiled King James II. Towneley's grandfather died in 1707, as did his father four years later.

With an allowance of only £60 a year under his father's will, in 1715 Towneley entered Gray's Inn, and studied law under William Salkeld. His eldest brother, also called Richard, was captured at Preston during the 1715 Rising but a jury acquitted him of treason in May 1716, although the trial involved the family in heavy expenses. Around 1728, Towneley and his younger brother Francis, who would also become involved with the Jacobite cause, moved to France.

The English Catholic gentry formed a small, tight-knit group, including the Stricklands, a family based in Westmoreland and Catterick, North Yorkshire. It is suggested John spent time at the exile court in Rome, and served as head of household for Henry Stuart in 1743. There he would have met Francis Strickland (1691-1746), a long-time resident in Rome and one of the Seven Men of Moidart who accompanied Prince Charles to Scotland in 1745.

== Career ==
=== Military ===
In 1731 Towneley entered Roth's regiment of the Irish Brigade as a lieutenant. He fought in the War of the Polish Succession and was present at the Siege of Philippsburg (1734), being promoted to captain in 1735.

During the Jacobite Rising of 1745, he traveled to Scotland and returned to France in March, carrying dispatches from the Marquis d'Éguilles, unofficial French envoy to the Jacobite leadership. In a report dated 20 February to René d'Argenson, French Foreign Minister, d'Éguilles described Towneley as "a man of most intelligence and prudence amongst those here with the prince. You may question him on all subjects."

His younger brother Francis had been taken prisoner at the surrender of Carlisle in late December 1745, and was executed the following July. In the autumn of 1746, Towneley and forty-two other Jacobite officers, received a grant of money from Louis XV, his share being 1,200 livres, and in December he received the order of Saint Louis.

=== Translator ===
Towneley was a member of Marie Anne Doublet's salon in Paris, which met in an annexe of the Filles-Saint-Thomas convent. He may have been admitted after being sent, during his military service with messages for Doublet, by Éguilles who was also a member. At these regular gatherings of the intellectual and those eager to learn of news and scandal, the prevailing topic of conversation was literature. It is also thought each guest sat for a portrait, the hostess herself having painted some of them.

Towneley was a great admirer of the 17th-century English mock-heroic narrative poem Hudibras written by Samuel Butler. Voltaire had described it as untranslatable except in the fashion in which he himself compressed four hundred lines into eighty. The poem had been turned into German verse in 1737, and in 1755 Jacques Fleury published the first canto in French prose, offering to issue the remainder if the public wished for it. Towneley began translating passages from it for the amusement of the other salon members and John Needham, the tutor of his grand-nephew Charles Townley, ultimately induced him to complete the translation. It was published anonymously in 1757, ostensibly at London to avoid censorship, but really at Paris. The English original was given on parallel pages, with William Hogarth's engravings reproduced, Towneley wrote a preface, while Needham appended explanatory notes.

Towneley felt he did not have the ability to give the spirit and humour of the original. The translation has been praised by Horace Walpole, and Henry Hart Milman, but others such as Jean-Baptiste-Antoine Suard, in the Biographie Universelle, though acknowledging its fidelity, called the diction poor and the verses unpoetical, "the work of a foreigner familiar with French but unable to write it with elegance". John Goldworth Alger, the author of Towneley's entry in the Dictionary of National Biography wrote that "it certainly lacks the swing and the burlesque rhymes of the original".

Charles Townley presented the British Museum with a copy of it containing William Skelton's portrait of the translator, dated in 1797. This may have been engraved from the portrait which must have been possessed by Madame Doublet.

A second edition of his translation, with the English text revised by Sir John Byerley and the French spelling modernised, was printed by Firmin Didot at Paris in 1819.

== Death ==
Towneley lived in Paris for around 30 years, but never married. He died at Chiswick, London, at the residence of his nephew and namesake, (Note: The younger John was Richard's son, and close to Charles, his nephew. He was living at Corney House on the River Thames in 1762, continuing to own it until its sale to Sir Charles Rouse-Boughton in 1792.) early in 1782, and was buried in Chiswick churchyard. Some fragmentary manuscripts in his handwriting were included in the sale of the Towneley library in 1883.
