= John Holker (Jacobite) =

Industrial espionage agent

John Holker (1719 – 27 April 1786) was an English Jacobite soldier, industrialist, and one of the world's first industrial espionage agents.

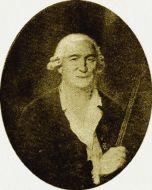
Picture of John Holker

== Early life ==
Born in Stretford, Lancashire, England, to blacksmith John Holker and his wife Alice Morris. He married a local woman, Elizabeth Hilton, in 1740, and while still in his twenties, he set up a calendering business in Manchester, in partnership with Peter Moss. When Bonnie Prince Charlie's army entered the town in 1746, both men purchased commissions in the Jacobite regiment that was raised there. Holker and Moss were captured at Carlisle during the army's retreat, and were incarcerated in Newgate Prison, in London. They succeeded in escaping together, and Holker made his way, via Holland, to France, where he joined the Scottish Ogilvy Regiment, a Jacobite regiment in the French army, seeing service in Flanders.

Holker and his wife became French citizens in 1766.

== French textile industry ==
Holker came to the attention of Daniel-Charles Trudaine, head of the French Bureau of Commerce. Trudaine believed that Holker would be able to increase the competence of the French cotton industry, based in Rouen, raising it to the standards of the English, and he provided funds and resources to allow Holker to set up two factories: one for spinning and weaving, and the other for the finishing of cloth, particularly by calendering. Holker returned to England, and with help from his mother, managed to recruit a sufficient number of skilled workers for his new factories. He also managed to acquire some of the necessary textile machinery and have it shipped to France. Holker subsequently submitted a proposal to the French government suggesting that a scheme should be set up to encourage the "seduction" of workers and machinery from England and that agents should be employed for that purpose. The French government approved Holker's idea, and appointed him inspector-general of foreign manufactures in 1756, with a brief to identify those industries that might benefit from "an infusion of English technology and workers".

Holker's samples and descriptions of textiles, including the earliest known samples of jean fabric, are preserved in a manuscript at the Musée des Arts Décoratifs, Paris. In 2023 a facsimile of the manuscript along with related essays was published.

== French chemical industry ==
Holker also developed an interest in the French chemical industry, and in particular the manufacture of vitriol, an archaic name for sulphuric acid, which could be used as a bleach for linen. At the time, Britain had a monopoly on the manufacture of vitriol, but working with his son Holker was able to establish a factory at Saint-Sever, a suburb of Rouen, which produced the acid in sufficient quantities not only to supply the needs of France, but also to turn the country into an exporter of sulphuric acid.
