= How the Hangman Lost His Heart =

2006 novel by K M Grant

How The Hangman Lost His Heart
- First edition
- Author: K. M. Grant
- Language: English
- Published: 2006
- Publisher: Puffin Books
- Publication place: United States
- Pages: 256

How The Hangman Lost His Heart is a 2006 young adult novel by K. M. Grant which is set in mid-18th century England after the Second Jacobite Rebellion.

== Plot ==
Alice Towneley's beloved uncle, Colonel Frank Towneley, has just been executed by Dan Skinslicer for supporting Prince Bonnie Charlie during the Second Jacobite Rebellion. After the drawing and quartering, Dan expresses his sympathy towards Alice and remarks that Frank was the first condemned to have his eyes wide open during his execution.
