= James Bradshaw (Jacobite) =

James Bradshaw (1717–1746) was an English Jacobite rebel.

== Life ==
Bradshaw was the only child of a well-to-do Roman Catholic in trade at Manchester. He was educated at Manchester free school, and learned some classics there. About 1734 he was bound apprentice to Charles Worral, a Manchester factor, trading at the Golden Ball, Lawrence Lane, London.

In 1740 Bradshaw was called back to Manchester through the illness of his father, and after his father's death he found himself in possession of a thriving trade and several thousand pounds. Very quickly (about 1741) he took a London partner, James Dawson, near the Axe Inn, Aldermanbury, and he married a Miss Waggstaff of Manchester. She and an only child both died in 1743.

Bradshaw threw in his lot with Charles Edward Stuart, when the prince and his Jacobite army invaded England. Bradshaw was one of the Jacobites assembled at Carlisle on 10 November 1745. He arrived back in Manchester on 29 November, where he went recruiting at the Bell Inn. He was a member of the Jacobite council of war, and received fellow Jacobites in his own house. Having accepted a captaincy in Colonel Francis Towneley's Manchester Regiment he marched to Derby, paying his men out of his own purse; he headed his company on horseback in the skirmish at Clifton Moor; he attended Charles Edward Stuart's levée on the retreat through Carlisle in December; and preferring to be in Lord Elcho's troop of horse when the Jacobite army was back in Scotland in the early weeks of 1746, he fought at the Battle of Falkirk Muir.

Bradshaw was at Stirling, Perth, Strathbogie, and finally at Culloden, on 16 April 1746, where in the rout he was taken prisoner. In his scaffold speech later that year, Bradshaw made scathing remarks about the commander of the Hanoverian forces, The Prince William, Duke of Cumberland. Bradshaw noted that 'After the battle of Culloden I had the misfortune to fall into the hands of the most ungenerous enemy that I believe ever assumed the name of a soldier, I mean the pretended Duke of Cumberland, and those under his command, whose inhumanity exceeded anything I could have imagined' Bradshaw is an important eyewitness for the aftermath of the battle. He highlighted the barbaric treatment of the Jacobite prisoners by the Hanoverian regime: 'I was put into one of the Scotch kirks together with a great number of wounded prisoners who were stripped naked and then left to die of their wounds without the least assistance; and though we had a surgeon of our own, a prisoner in the same place, yet he was not permitted to dress their wounds, but his instruments were taken from him on purpose to prevent it; and in consequence of this many expired in the utmost agonies'.

Bradshaw was then taken to London by ship, with forty-two fellow-prisoners. He was taken to the New Gaol, Southwark; his trial took place at St. Margaret's Hill on 27 October. On that occasion he was dressed in new green cloth, and conducted his defence with great vigour. His counsel (who only had limited input into the trial, in accordance with the legal rules of the time) argued that Bradshaw had always had "lunatick pranks", and had been driven entirely mad by the death of his wife and child. Bradshaw was found guilty, and having been kept in gaol nearly a month more, he was executed on Kennington Common, 28 November 1746, aged 29. His scaffold speech gave an effective and eloquent defence of his Jacobite principles, including religion: 'I die a member of the Church of England, which I am satisfied would flourish more under the reign of a Stewart than it does now, or has done for many years. The friends of the House of Hanover say they keep out Popery. But do they not let in Infidelity, which is almost become (if I may so say) the religion established?'
