= K. M. Grant =

British children's author

Katharine Mary Grant (née Towneley; born 1958) is a British children's writer based in Scotland. She is best known for her DeGranville Trilogy published by Walker Books.

== Biography ==
Katharine Mary Towneley was born in 1958, in Cliviger to Sir Simon Towneley and Lady Mary Fitzherbert. She grew up at Dyneley Hall near Burnley, and attended Glasgow University.

In 1985, she married William Marr Couper Grant. They have three children together and live in Glasgow.

== Publications ==
=== Standalone books ===
- How the Hangman Lost His Heart. Puffin Books. 2006. ISBN 978-0-141-31950-6.
- Belle's Song. New York: Walker & Co. 2011. ISBN 978-0-8027-2275-1.

=== De Granville trilogy ===
- Blood Red Horse. New York: Walker & Co. 2005. ISBN 978-0-8027-8960-0.
- Green Jasper. Walker. 2006. ISBN 978-0-141-31737-3.
- Blaze of Silver. New York: Walker. 2007. ISBN 978-0-8027-9625-7.

=== Perfect Fire trilogy ===
- Blue Flame. New York: Walker. 2008. ISBN 978-0-8027-9694-3.
- White Heat. New York: Walker & Co. 2009. ISBN 978-0-8027-9695-0.
- Paradise Red. Quercus. 2009. ISBN 978-1-847-24707-0.
