= Blaze of Silver =

2007 novel

- Puffin Books edition, 2007
- Author: K M Grant
- Language: English
- Series: De Granville Trilogy
- Genre: Children's fiction
- Publisher: Puffin Books (UK); Walker & Company (US)
- Publication date: 3 April 2007
- Publication place: United Kingdom; United States
- ISBN: 0802796257
- OCLC: 779097347
- Preceded by: Green Jasper

Blaze of Silver is a 2007 young adult historical novel by K M Grant and the final book in the De Granville Trilogy. The book was released on April 3, 2007 by Puffin Books in the UK and Walker Children's in the US.

== Plot summary ==
The book takes place shortly after the events in Green Jasper and follows Will, Ellie, Kamil, and Hosanna as they try to deliver the ransom for King Richard. This proves to be difficult, as the leader of the Assassins is seeking revenge against Kamil and is willing to organise a huge betrayal to do so.

== Reception ==
Critical reception for the book was mixed. Booklist wrote that the book's portrayal of horses was one of its highlights, but that "the author's shifting focus makes it hard to decide just who the protagonist is". The School Library Journal also gave a mostly positive review, stating that the book was "satisfying, though perhaps somewhat contrived".
