= Seven Men of Moidart =

Group of Jacobites in the 1745 uprising

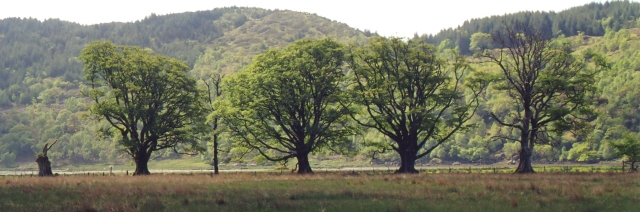
Survivors of the beech trees known as the Seven Men of Moidart, in commemoration of Jacobite folklore.

The Seven Men of Moidart, in Jacobite folklore, were seven followers of Charles Edward Stuart who accompanied him at the start of his 1745 attempt to reclaim the thrones of Great Britain and Ireland for the House of Stuart. The group included English, Scots and Irish subjects of varying backgrounds linked mostly by their involvement in pro-Stuart intrigues. Although some had military experience, most of the men were relatively elderly by the standards of the time; some were already infirm and little suited to the rigours of campaigning.

The seven accompanied Charles on the French privateer Du Teillay, initially landing on Eriskay; the group later reached the mainland at Borrodale in Loch Nan Uamh, Lochailort, then returned to Borrodale before travelling to Kinlochmoidart. In the early 19th century a row of beech trees was planted at Kinlochmoidart in commemoration of the events.

== List of the Men of Moidart ==
=== The Marquess of Tullibardine ===
William Murray, Marquess of Tullibardine (1689–1746), eldest surviving son of the 1st Duke of Atholl and brother of Jacobite Lieutenant-General Lord George Murray, had been heavily involved in the risings of 1715 (following which he was attainted for treason) and 1719. He spent the following years in exile in France, suffering from poor health and relative poverty, despite secret financial support from his family in Scotland.

During the 1745 rising, as the senior representative of the house of Atholl, he was chosen to unfurl Charles's standard at Glenfinnan on 16 August though his military activity was limited by gout. He was captured following the defeat at Culloden and imprisoned in the Tower of London: in very poor health at the time of his arrival, he died shortly afterwards.

=== John William O'Sullivan ===
Sir John William O'Sullivan (1700–c.1760) was an Irish professional soldier who, like many Irish Jacobites, had served in the French army. Service in Corsica had given him experience of irregular warfare, and he was highly regarded and trusted by Charles. O'Sullivan was appointed the Jacobite army's Adjutant-General and Quartermaster-General and was an influential figure in the Jacobite "Council of War".

After the rebellion's failure, Scottish Jacobites were quick to blame O'Sullivan for "tactical ineptitude", a view repeated by 19th century historians and into modern times. More recent scholarship has challenged this view, concluding that this reputation was probably undeserved and that O'Sullivan was effective in the roles given to him. He later returned to service in the French army and wrote a detailed narrative account of the rebellion.

=== Sir Thomas Sheridan ===
Sir Thomas Sheridan (c.1684–1746) was an Anglo-Irish Jacobite courtier who had previously been involved in the 1715 rising. Sheridan was the son of a former Chief Secretary for Ireland; his mother, Helen Appleby, was rumoured to be an illegitimate daughter of James II. Having been appointed Charles Stuart's governor, he had a close and trusting relationship with him and was a member of the Jacobite Council during the rebellion. Following the Jacobite defeat at Culloden in April 1746, Sheridan escaped Scotland on the French privateer Mars: he had been in poor health for some time and died later that year at Rome.

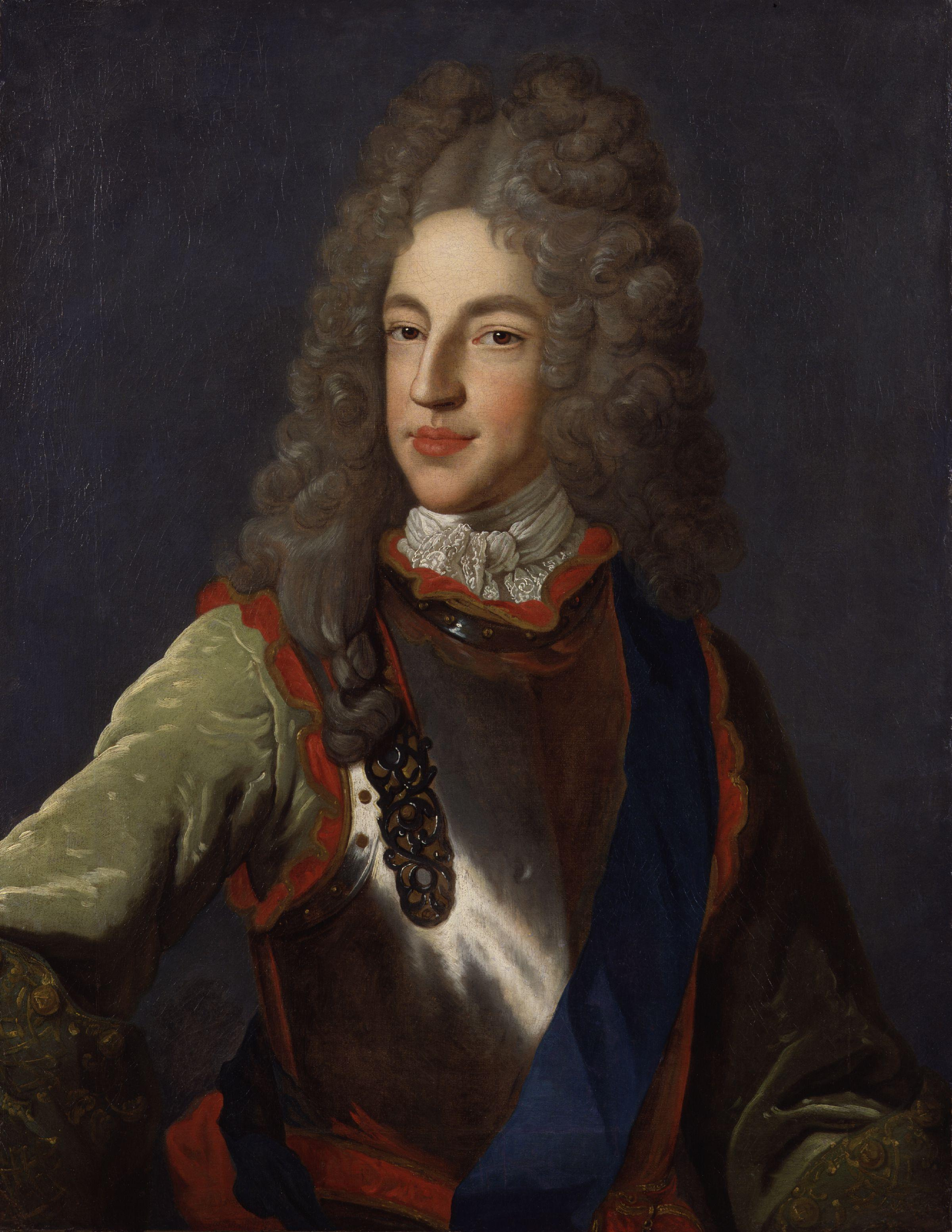
James Francis Edward Stuart, the Jacobite pretender. Despite the rebellion being undertaken in his name, he intensely disliked one of Charles's companions (Strickland), seriously mistrusted at least one other (Kelly), and was angry with a third (Sheridan) for permitting Charles to become involved.

=== Sir John MacDonald ===
Sir John MacDonald, or Macdonnell, (d. aft. 1760) a French subject of Irish origin, was a cavalryman and veteran of the French Régiment de Fitz-James cavalerie. MacDonald, said to be a relative of the 5th Earl of Antrim, a member of Clan MacDonnell of Antrim, and a distant kinsman of the Scottish Clan Donald, served as the Jacobite Inspector-General of Cavalry during the rebellion. He commanded the cavalry at Culloden, surrendered at Inverness, and was subsequently repatriated.

MacDonald clashed on several occasions with Lord George Murray, whose memoir depicted him as "old and [...] much subject to his bottle", and which claimed that Keppoch described him as "drunk or mad, if not both". As with O'Sullivan, Murray's depiction was a strong influence on 19th century accounts, which presented Charles's Irish-born advisors in a negative light. This view has also been reassessed, concluding that MacDonald was a competent officer. The experience of the 1745 rebellion seems to have influenced him to the degree he subsequently signed his name using the Scottish spelling "MacDonald". He also left a narrative account of the rebellion, which has been described as "disarmingly frank about his own limitations". Surviving correspondence from MacDonald shows that he was still alive in 1760.

=== Francis Strickland ===
Colonel Francis Strickland (1691–1746) was an English Roman Catholic from an old Westmorland family, the Stricklands of Sizergh Castle, who were longstanding Stuart loyalists. He had been involved in the 1715 rising and had some Continental military experience; MacDonald claimed to have served with him in Spain. Strickland later came to the Jacobite court at Rome: Charles's father James regarded him as a bad influence, partly as he had suggested Charles become an Anglican to secure political backing in England. On finding he had accompanied the expedition to Scotland, James attempted to have Strickland dismissed.

Strickland was taken ill on the march through Scotland and was left at Carlisle: following its retaking by the government he appears to have claimed to be a French subject, but died there on 1 January 1746. James later wrote a letter to Charles describing the deaths of Strickland and Sheridan as "a manifest call from heaven for you to [...] rescue yourself from such hands".

=== George Kelly ===
The Rev. George Kelly (1688–1762) was an Irish nonjuring Protestant clergyman, born in County Roscommon. He attended Trinity College Dublin. In 1722 he was involved in the pro-Stuart Atterbury Plot; he was arrested, forfeited his estates, and was imprisoned in the Tower of London at the King's pleasure, before later escaping. In 1736 a memoir of his experiences was published by Edmund Curll. He was said to be distrusted by James and to have had little understanding of the situation in England but was brought by Charles for his management of the rebels' propaganda efforts. He drafted the Manifesto issued by Charles early in the rebellion. Kelly, described by Charles's biographer McLynn as "one of the few truly evil men among the Jacobites", was sent back to France to report on the Jacobite victory at the Battle of Prestonpans and did not return to Scotland. To James's dismay he continued to serve as Charles's secretary. He was said to have died at Avignon in October 1762.

=== Aeneas Macdonald ===
Aeneas Macdonald (c.1715–1770) was a Scots-French banker, who had spent most of his adult life in Paris. He was the son of a Clanranald tacksman, Ranald MacDonald of Kinlochmoidart; his younger brother, Donald MacDonald of Kinlochmoidart, also played a prominent role in the rebellion as Charles's Aide-de-camp.

Prior to the uprising, the Gaelic songs and poetry of Alasdair Mac Mhaighstir Alasdair, such as: Òran Nuadh — "A New Song", Òran nam Fineachan Gaidhealach — "The Song of the Highland Clans" and Òran do'n Phrionnsa — "A Song to the Prince," were, according to literary historian John MacKenzie, sent to Aeneas MacDonald, in Paris. Aeneas read the poems aloud to Prince Charles Edward Stuart in English translation and the poems played a major role in convincing the Prince to come to Scotland and to initiate the Jacobite Rising of 1745. MacDonald was responsible for arranging much of Charles's initial funding, though later presented himself as a reluctant participant in the expedition who only accompanied them in order to exert influence on his brother.

Captured by the government after Culloden, he was initially sentenced to death but was instead exiled. He wrote a memoir of the rebellion which was among those reproduced by Robert Forbes. MacDonald returned to France; a commonly cited, though erroneous, tradition states that he was killed during the French Revolution, though he in fact died in 1770.

== Other conspirators ==
Contrary to some relations of the folklore, a number of other people of lower social rank accompanied the conspirators. Some accounts cite the presence of Duncan Buchanan, a clerk for Aeneas MacDonald who acted as a Jacobite agent and messenger, instead of O'Sullivan.

== See also ==
- Seven Men of Knoydart
