= Siege of Carlisle (December 1745) =

1745 siege

Coordinates: 54.895°N 2.934°W

- Part of Jacobite rising of 1745
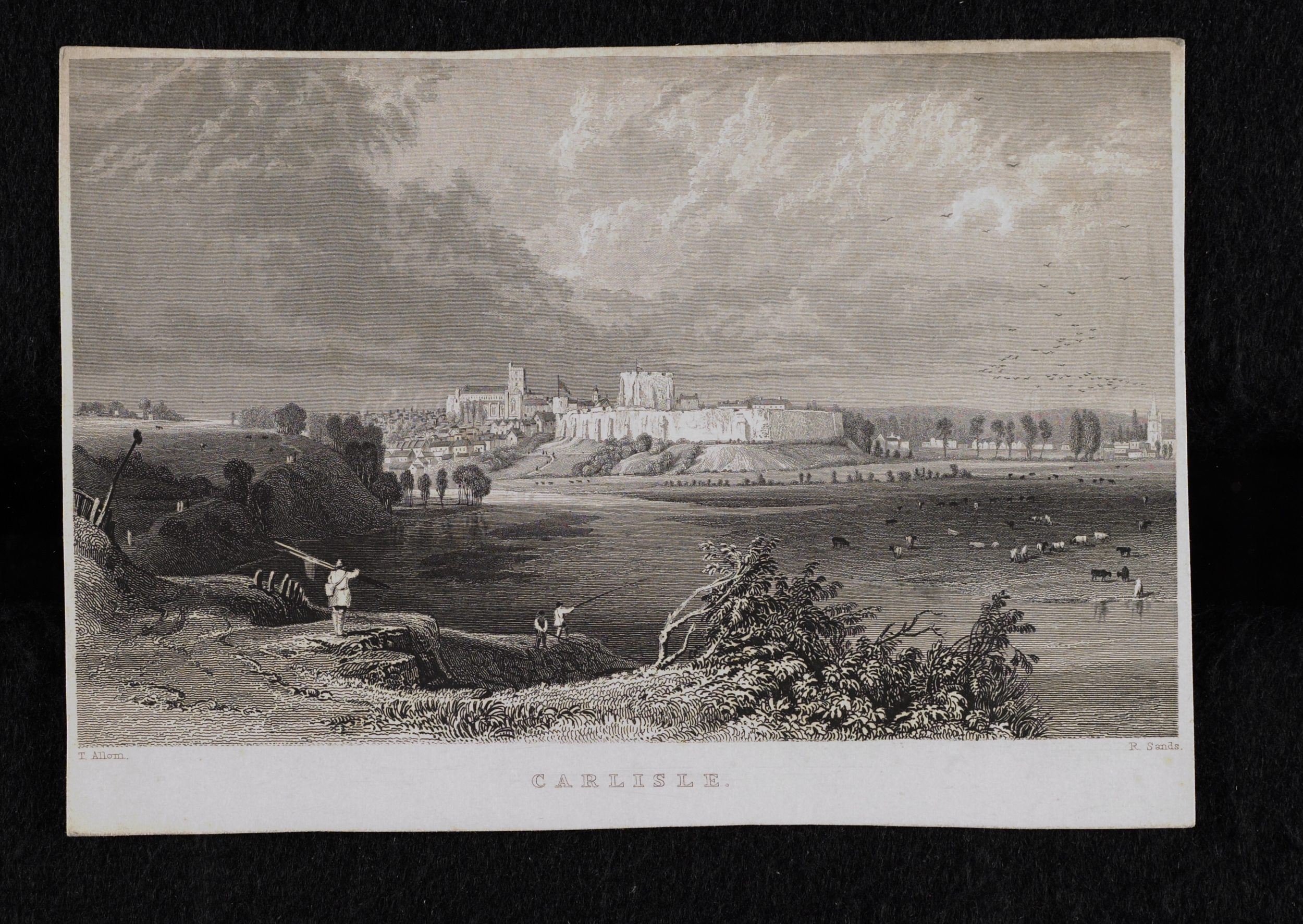
- View of Carlisle, by Thomas Allom
Date	21–30 December 1745
Location	Carlisle, England, Great Britain
Result	Government victory

Belligerents
Great Britain	Jacobites

Commanders and leaders
Duke of Cumberland; George Wade; William Belford	John Hamilton; Francis Towneley

Strength
5,050	400

Casualties and losses
2 killed, 11 wounded	1 killed, 15 wounded and 396 captured

The second siege of Carlisle in 1745 took place from 21 to 30 December during the Jacobite rising of that year, when a Jacobite garrison surrendered to government forces led by the Duke of Cumberland.

The town had been captured the previous month in the first siege of 1745 by the Jacobite army that invaded England in November 1745 and reached as far south as Derby, before turning back on 6 December. They re-entered Carlisle on 19 December, and after leaving a garrison of 400 men, the main army continued its retreat into Scotland the next day.

Advance elements of the government army reached Carlisle on 21 December, but siege operations were delayed until their heavy artillery arrived six days later. They commenced firing on 28 December, and the Jacobites surrendered on 30th; 384 prisoners were taken, some of whom were later executed and others transported to the West Indies.

== Background ==
The Jacobite army entered England on 8 November 1745 and reached Carlisle on 10th. Previously an important border fortress, its defences had been neglected since the 1707 Union but it remained a formidable challenge for the Jacobites, who had no siege equipment. They insisted on the surrender of both town and castle, threatening to burn them if not; although Jacobite officer O'Sullivan later admitted this was a bluff, Carlisle capitulated on 15 November. Leaving a small garrison under Colonel John Hamilton to hold the castle, the army continued south.

After turning back from Derby, the Jacobites re-entered Carlisle on 19 December and continued into Scotland the next day, leaving a garrison of around 400. Prince Charles did so to demonstrate his determination to return, but the decision was almost unanimously condemned by his colleagues. One officer, James Johnstone, later recorded he refused to remain with the garrison, as he 'would never be a victim by choice.'

== Siege ==
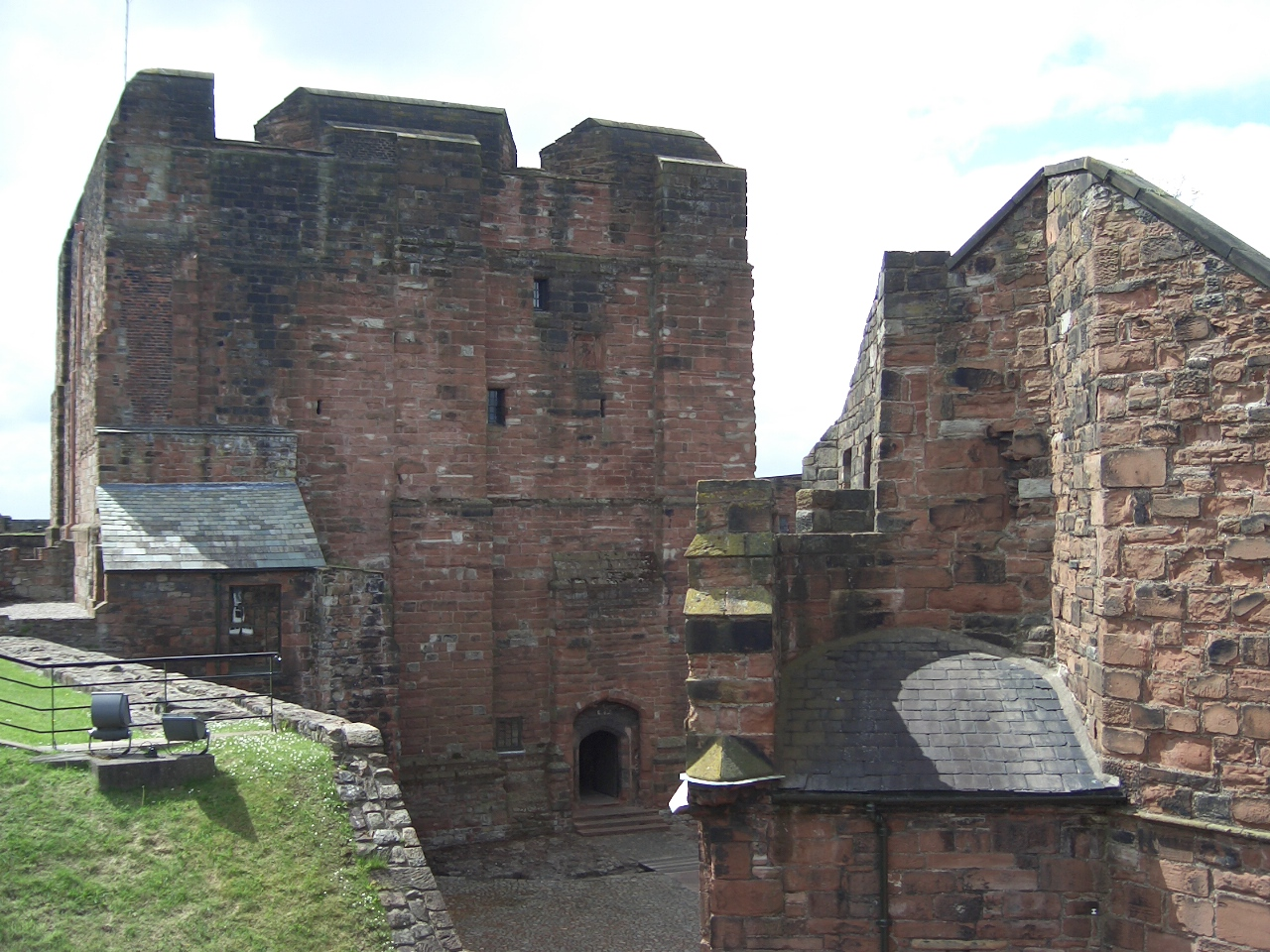
Despite years of neglect, Carlisle Castle remained a formidable obstacle

The castle garrison was commanded by Hamilton, the town by Francis Towneley, colonel of the Manchester Regiment, the only significant unit recruited in England. He had previously held a commission in the French army, and Jacobite cavalry officer Sir John MacDonald viewed him as having "the greatest intelligence and prudence" of those on Prince Charles' staff. He also had a reputation for being hot-tempered, and one of his subordinates James Bradshaw transferred to another unit, rather than continue serving under him.

Government records show that of the 396 prisoners taken when the garrison surrendered, 114 were English members of the Manchester Regiment, 274 were Scots, mostly from Lowland units like Glenbuckets' and Lord Ogilvie's regiments, while 8 were French. However, many of the English recruits were unarmed, while most of the 46 pieces of artillery available were unused, as the defenders had little ammunition.

On 21 December, advance elements of Cumberland's army arrived outside the town; over the next few days, their numbers increased to over 5,000, including a contingent from Newcastle under George Wade. In their attempts to catch up with the retreating Jacobites, the heavy guns had been left at Lichfield and Cumberland was forced to wait for additional artillery to be brought up; meanwhile, his troops blockaded the town and began constructing gun positions.

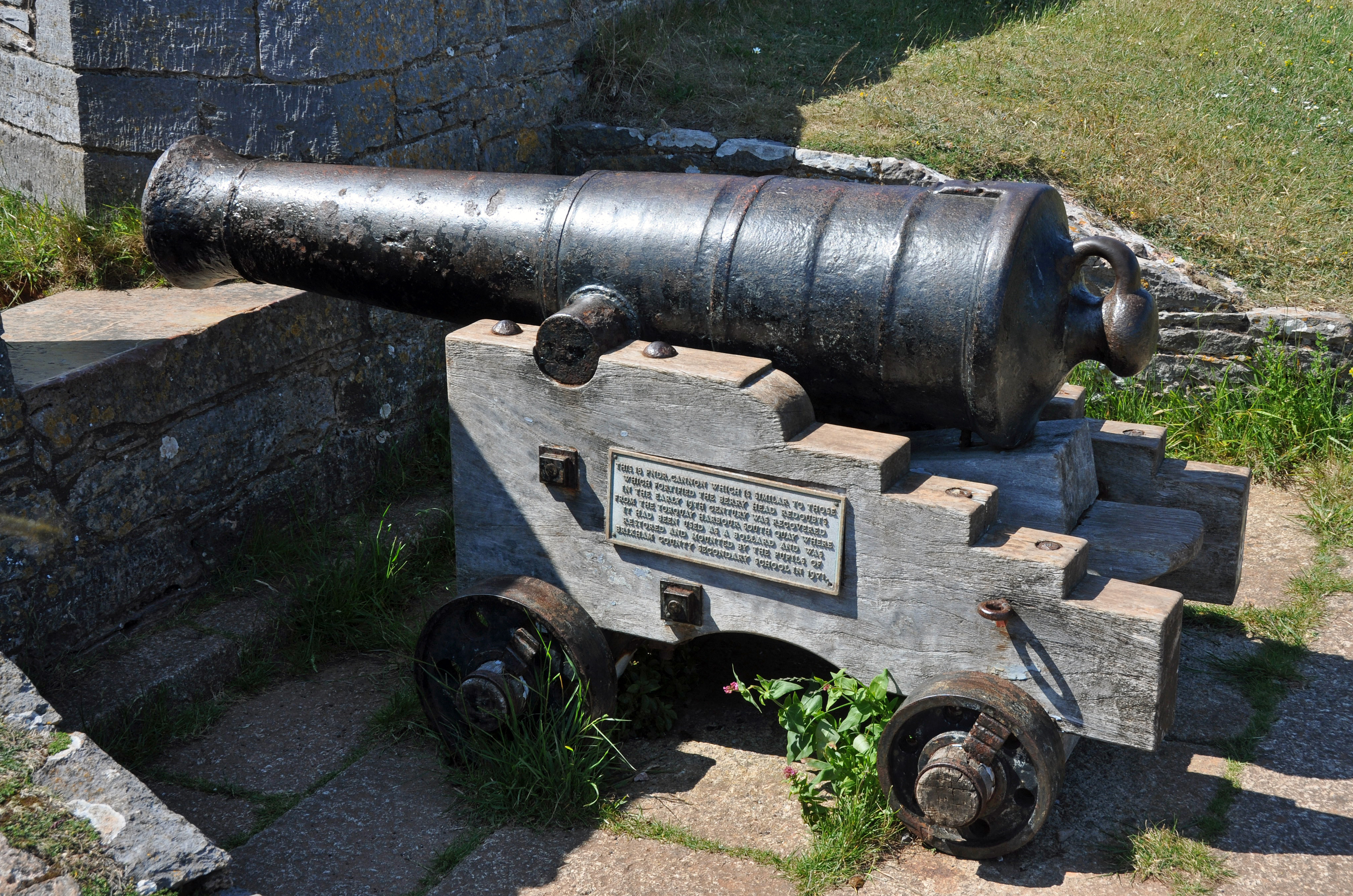
An 18 pounder cannon, similar to those used by William Belford to fire on the castle

Taking even a rundown fort was not easy, a fact acknowledged by Cumberland, who wanted to prosecute the civic officials who surrendered the town to the Jacobites in November, despite their complete lack of siege equipment. The Duke of Richmond, grandson of Charles II and one of Cumberland's officers, wrote to Newcastle on 24 December predicting the capture of Carlisle would take some time. Towneley reinforced the defences and his men fired 'upon every body who has shown himself;' while this did little damage, it demonstrated an assault would face determined resistance.

The first battery of siege guns arrived on 25 December; more arrived on 27th from Whitehaven, along with 70-80 naval gunners under William Belford, an experienced artillery specialist who served under Cumberland in Flanders. On 28th, they began firing on the castle and apart from a short pause caused by shortage of ammunition, continued until the morning of 30 December, when Hamilton offered to surrender.

In contests between regular armies, the garrison would have surrendered on terms, which at the minimum meant being treated as prisoners of war; as rebels, Cumberland only granted their lives, subject to the 'King's pleasure' ie they would not be summarily executed but receive a trial. Towneley opposed surrender and felt they could have held out for better terms; he was over ruled and the garrison capitulated on the afternoon of 30 December.

== Aftermath ==
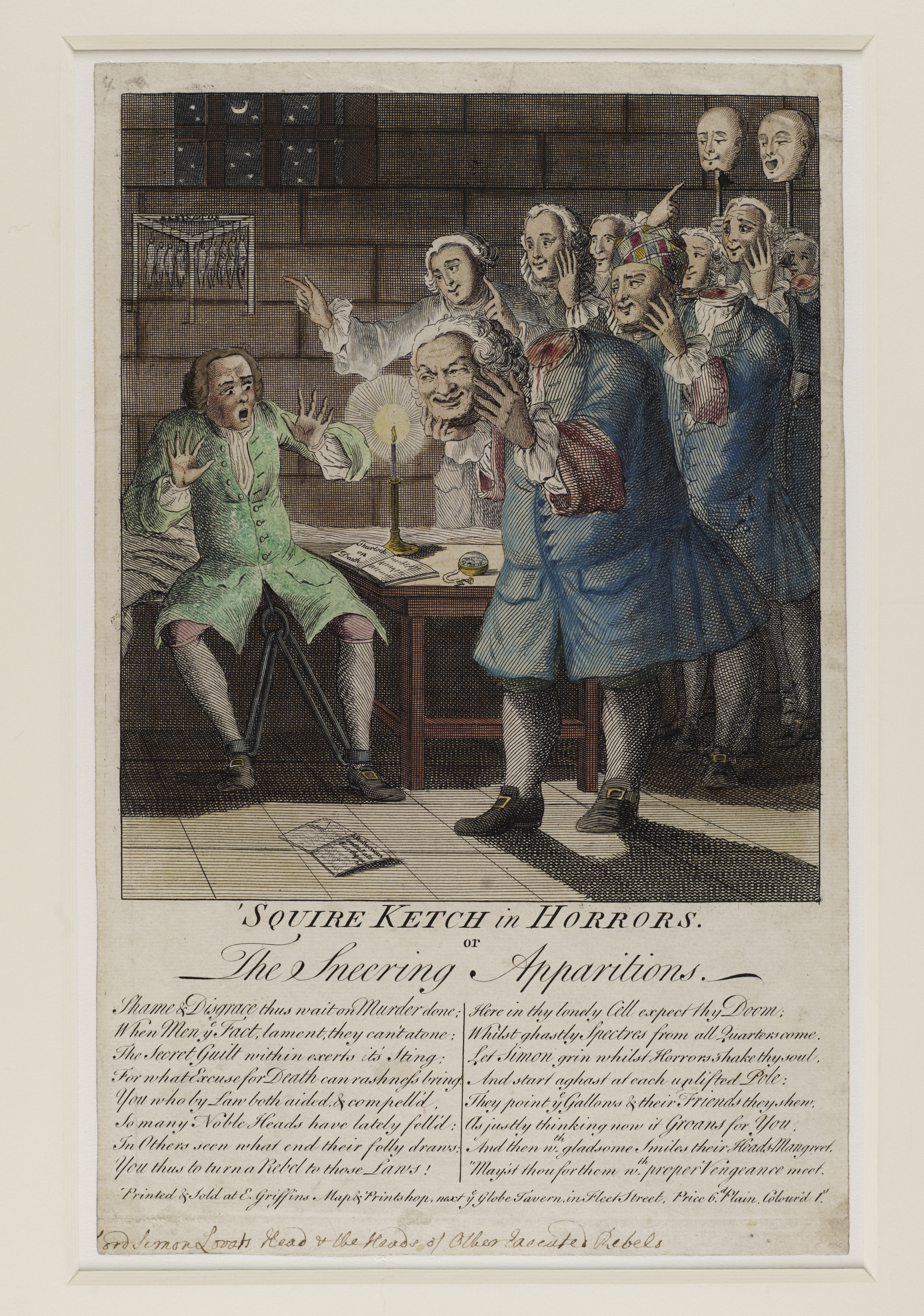
1750 cartoon; public executioner John Thrift confronted by his Jacobite victims, including Lovat (front), Towneley and Hamilton

Due to fears of a possible French invasion of south-East England, Cumberland returned to London, sending Henry Hawley to Edinburgh. His immediate objective was to secure Lowland Scotland but an attempt to lift the siege of Stirling Castle was defeated at Falkirk Muir on 17 January. The Jacobites were unable to follow up their victory and retreated to Inverness on 1 February; the rebellion ended on 16 April with defeat at Culloden.

Two Irish officers, Captains Brown and Maxwell, escaped over the walls and made their way to Scotland. Prince Charles at first refused to believe their report but the loss of nearly 400 men for little gain placed further strain on the already poor relationship between him and his Scottish officers.

Most of the Carlisle garrison were initially held in a dungeon in the castle without food or water for several days; in January, nearly 200 were transferred to York Castle, where they joined 80 prisoners taken at Clifton Moor. 27 members of the Manchester Regiment were executed, including nine officers who were hanged, drawn and quartered in London on 30 July 1746; they included Towneley, whose argument he was a French officer was rejected by the court. Hamilton, along with a number of others including James Bradshaw and Sir John Wedderburn, was executed on 28 November.

In all, 3,471 Jacobite prisoners were indicted for treason; in addition to those from the Manchester Regiment, 93 suffered death, including 40 recaptured British army deserters. 33 of these executions were carried out between October and November 1746 at Harraby Hill outside Carlisle, most of whom are thought to have been members of the garrison. Of the remainder, 650 died awaiting trial, 900 pardoned and the rest transported; the Act of Indemnity 1747 pardoned any remaining prisoners, among them Flora MacDonald.

== Sources ==
- Capital Punishment UK. "Cumberland; 1735-1799". Capital Punishment UK.
- Chambers, Robert (1830). History of the Rebellion in Scotland, vol II. Hurst, Chance & Co.
- Johnstone, James (1822). Memoirs of the Rebellion in 1745 and 1746 (2010 ed.). Kessinger Publishing. ISBN 978-1163445273.
- Oates, Jonathan (2010). "The Manchester Regiment of 1745". Journal of the Society for Army Historical Research. 88 (354).
- Oates, Jonathan (2003). "The Last Siege on English Soil; Carlisle, December 1745". Transactions of the Cumberland and Westmorland Antiquarian and Archaeological Society. New Series, volume III. doi:10.5284/1064741.
- Pickard, Steve. "York Castle and the 1745 Rebellion". York Museum Trust.
- Riding, Jacqueline (2016). Jacobites: A New History of the 45 Rebellion. Bloomsbury. ISBN 978-1408819128.
- Roberts, John (2002). The Jacobite Wars: Scotland and the Military Campaigns of 1715 and 1745. Edinburgh University Press. ISBN 978-1902930299.
- Royle, Trevor (2016). Culloden; Scotland's Last Battle and the Forging of the British Empire. Little, Brown. ISBN 978-1408704011.
