= Kennington Common =

Former English cricket venue

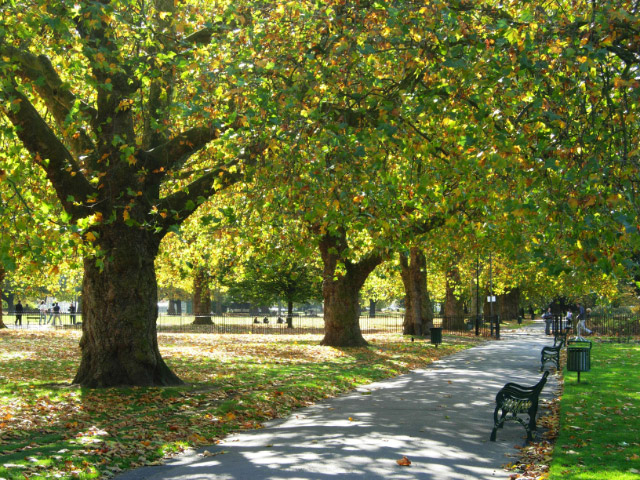
- Part of Kennington Common that is now Kennington Park.

- Location within Greater London
- Type: Common land
- Location: London Borough of Lambeth
- Coordinates: 51.483°N 0.107°W

Kennington Common was a swathe of common land mainly within the London Borough of Lambeth. It was one of the earliest venues for cricket around London, with matches played between 1724 and 1785. The common was also used for public executions, fairs and public gatherings. Important orators spoke there, addressing crowds numbering tens of thousands.

== Early history ==
In 1600, the common was bounded on the south west by Vauxhall Creek, and extended over marshy land to the south west of the Roman road called Stane Street, now Kennington Park Road. There is a 1660 record of a common keeper being paid for grazing. In 1661, the Vauxhall Pleasure Gardens were laid out nearby (its location is noted as the Vauxhall End at The Oval). The large open space was often used for a variety of purposes by people living on the south bank of the River Thames.

== Cricket in the 18th century ==
Kennington Common cricket ground
- Interactive map of Kennington Common cricket ground
- Location: Kennington, Surrey
- Home club: London Cricket Club (occasionally)
- County club: Surrey
- Establishment: by 1724
- Last used: 1785

Cricket is known to have been played on Kennington Common from 1724 to 1785, with 36 matches on record during that period, many of them historically important. (Note: Any match listed in the ACS' Important Match Guide (1981) is historically important, and therefore of the highest standard, whether or not a scorecard might exist. The same applies to numerous matches discovered by researchers since 1981. For further information, see First-class cricket.)

=== Early matches (1724–1730) ===
The common's earliest match on record is London against Dartford on 18 June 1724. These were the two leading club teams at the time, and the match was briefly pre-announced by the St James Evening Post on 16 June. On 29 August 1726, a combined London & Surrey team played Edwin Stead's XI for a purse of 25 guineas. F. S. Ashley-Cooper labelled this match as Kent v London & Surrey, but the Weekly Journal on 27 August clearly refers to Stead's team. London met Dartford again on 5 August 1729, and Dartford won by an unknown margin, described by the London Evening Post as "very much".

There were two matches on the common in August 1730. The first was played on the 17th between London and Surrey. London won by 1 run. According to Fog's Weekly Journal, 'it was thought to be one of the completest that ever was played'. This was possibly a "colts" match as the sources talk about "young gentlemen" taking part. The second match, on the 18th, was the completion of Kent versus London, which had begun on the 12th at Frog Lane, in Islington. The match had finished at 19:00 on the 12th in compliance with its Articles of Agreement. It is known that 'the Londoners had 30 ahead when they shut up'. The teams agreed to play to a finish on the 18th, but on Kennington Common. However, the result is unknown.

=== 1731—enclosure ===
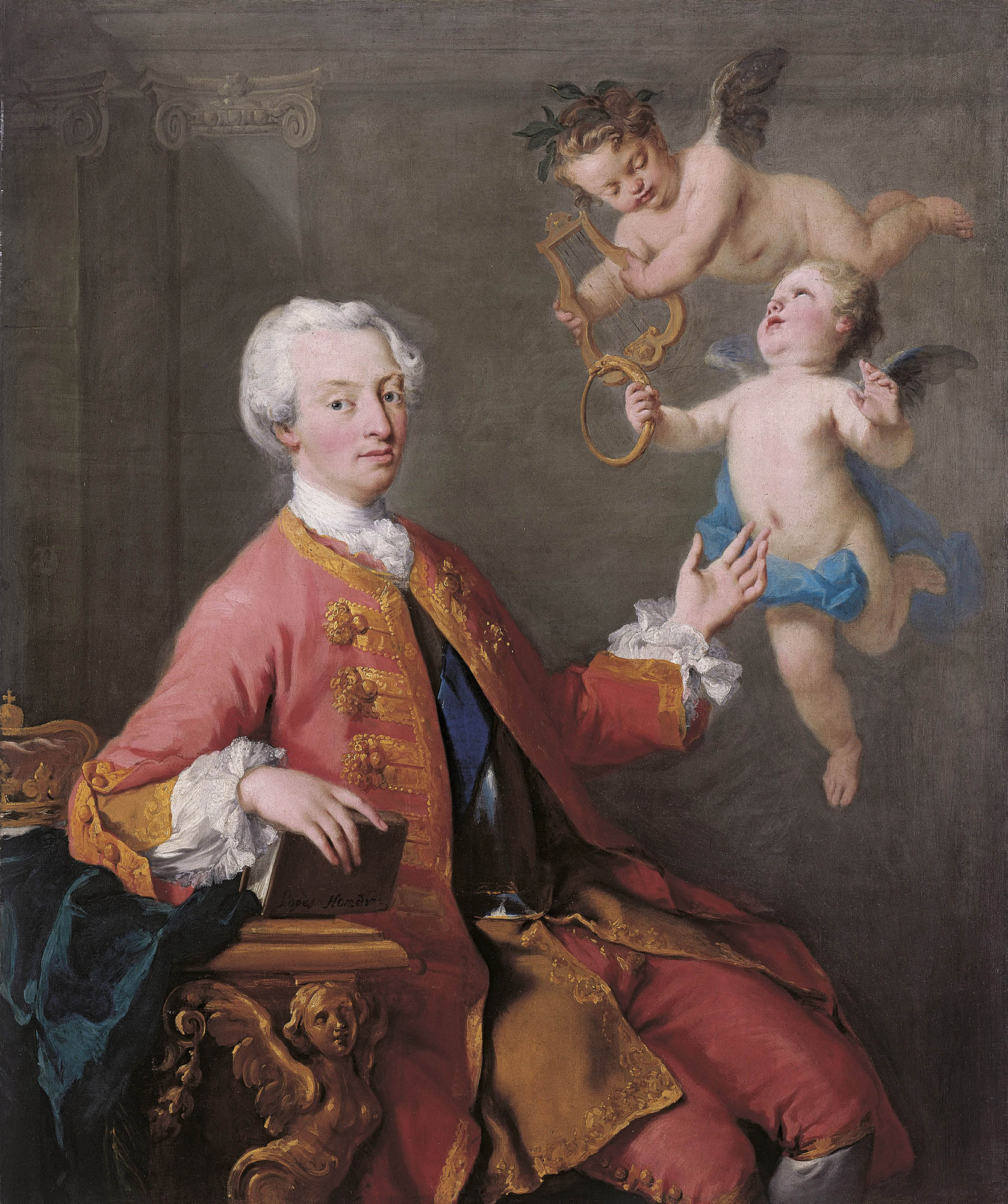
Frederick Louis, Prince of Wales, began his patronage of cricket after he attended a match on Kennington Common

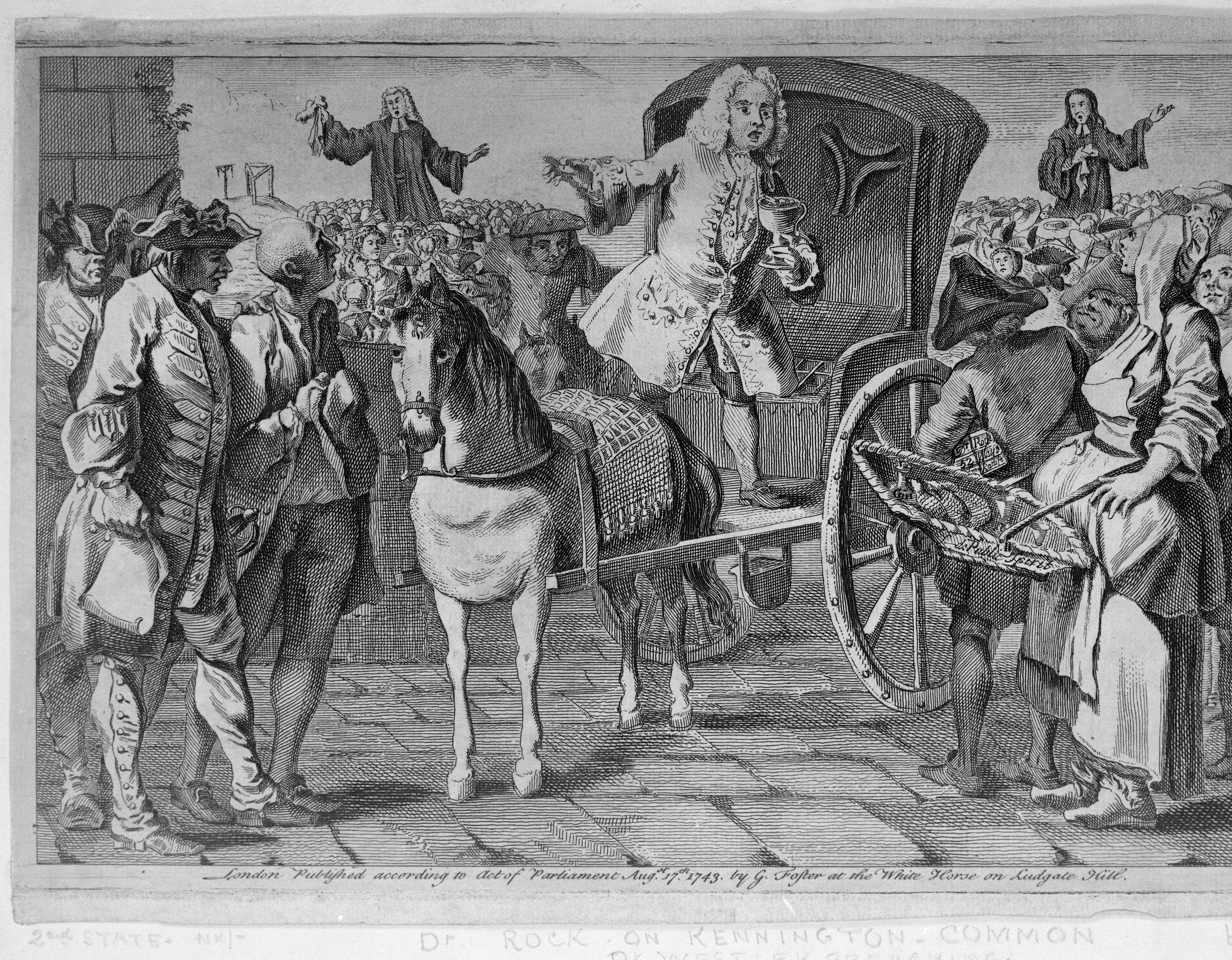
An engraving of Doctor Rock, an itinerant vendor of medicines, selling his wares from a horse-drawn carriage to a crowd at Kennington Common while John and Charles Wesley preach in the background (c.1743)

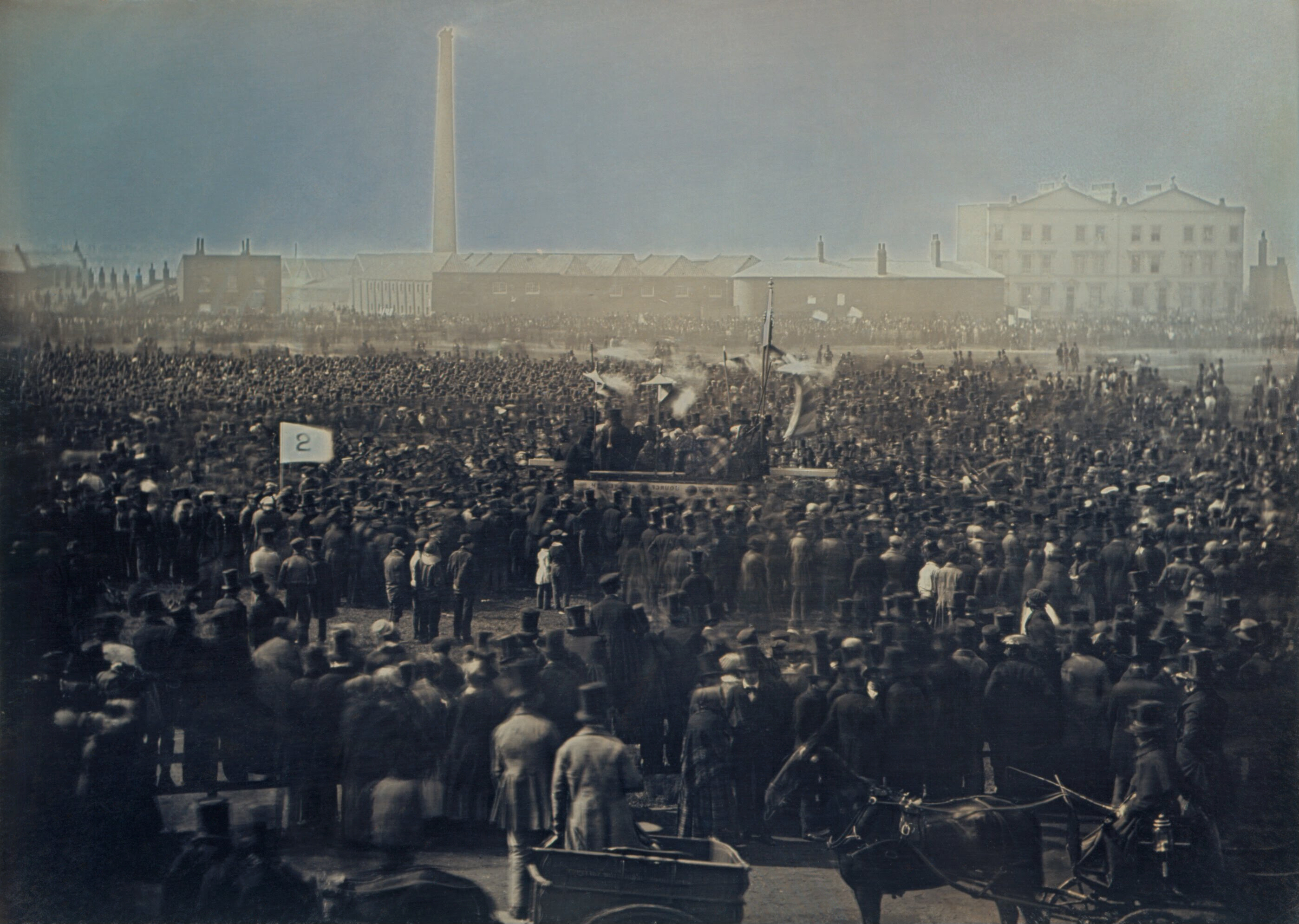
The Great Chartist Meeting on Kennington Common, 10 April 1848.

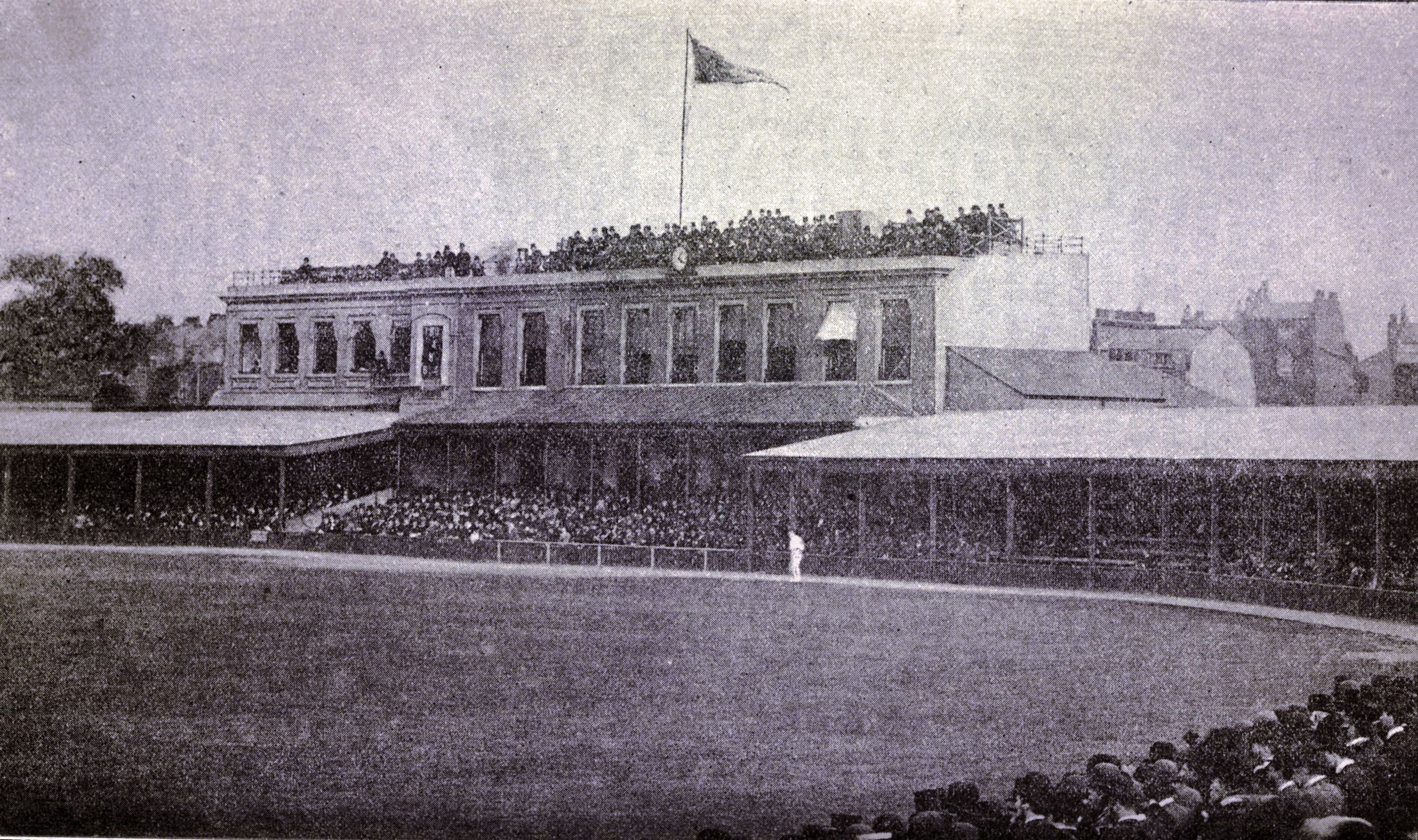
Kennington Oval in 1891.

There were three London matches between 31 May and 8 June against teams from Kent. The sources are ambiguous about the identities of these teams, and it is uncertain if any of them was the Kent county team. It is possible that they were Chelsfield, Dartford, and/or Sevenoaks. The result of the first match is unknown, and London won the other two.

On 12 July, London did play Sevenoaks on the common, and this match is the first one known to have been played in an enclosed ground. A pre-match announcement said: 'the ground will be roped round, and all persons are desired to keep without side of the same'. Kent played Middlesex on 19 July, the match billed in advance as 'the County of Kent v. the County of Middlesex, for £50 a side', but the result is unknown.

The Surrey v London game on 28 September was promoted as 'likely to be the best performance of this kind that has been seen for some time'. The ground was again enclosed: 'for the convenience of the gamesters, the ground is to be staked and roped out'. It seems, therefore, that enclosure quickly became common practice in 1731. In addition, the announcement refers to 'the whole county of Surrey' as London's opponents. The Prince of Wales was expected to attend, and this is his first recorded involvement in cricket.

=== 1732–1735 ===
There is no record of any matches being played on Kennington Common in 1732, and only one each in both 1733 and 1734. Both of those games were hosted by Surrey: against Kent on 10 September 1733; and against London on 26 August 1734. Neither result is known. The notice announcing the 1733 match said: 'To render it more commodious to the spectators, a great part of the said Common will be formed into a ring and roped round'. The field for the 1734 match was also 'to be roped out'.

Newspaper reports of the time were more concerned with wagers than results, and players were hardly ever mentioned by name. There was an exception on 7 August 1735 when the General Evening Post announced a single wicket match to take place on the common the following Monday (the 11th), involving seven players of the London Club. The game would be three against four with Dunn, Pool, and Wakeland against Marshall, Ellis, and two others. Ellis is known to have been London's best bowler, while Dunn was a noted batsman.

Also in 1735, the common staged two London versus Surrey matches. London won the first on 18 July 'with ease'. The second was on 23 September, but the result is unknown.

=== 1736 season ===
London and Mitcham played each other three times on the common in 1736. The first match was on 13 May, but the result is unknown. In the second match on 22 June, London won by an unknown margin. The result of the third match on 2 September is unknown. In another eleven-a-side game, Kent and Surrey met on 20 September. Kent scored 41 and 53; Surrey replied with 71 and 24/8 to win by 2 wickets. During this match, there was a crowd incident after three soldiers apprehended a deserter. Members of the crowd rescued the deserter, and 'after a severe discipline let [the soldiers] go about their business'.

The common staged a single wicket match on Thursday, 24 June, in which London's Wakeland, who was a distiller, and George Oldner played together against two 'famous' Richmond players. The unnamed Richmond pair, one of whom may have been William Sawyer, were 'esteemed the best two in England'. One player suffered serious facial injuries when the ball came off his bat, and hit his nose. A report in the Old Whig newspaper railed against 'human brutes' who insisted he should play on despite his injuries.

=== Later seasons (to 1785) ===
After the 1736 season, the London club increasingly used the Artillery Ground for its home matches, and that also became the main venue for the highly popular single wicket contests of the 1740s. Kennington Common became one of three home venues—with Moulsey Hurst and Laleham Burway—which were used occasionally by Surrey. The common's last known match of any importance was between Middlesex and Essex on 30/31 May 1785. Essex won by 6 wickets.

== Mass meetings ==
People would gather at the common to listen to public speakers, both religious and political. In 1739, the Methodists John Wesley and George Whitefield preached to an audience of 30,000. On 10 April 1848, Irish Chartist leader Feargus O'Connor addressed up to 50,000 people over a petition in support of the Land Plan.

== Executions ==
The Surrey gallows were where now stands St. Mark's Church, not far from Oval tube station. These could be used for the whole county but were overwhelmingly a south London equivalent of Tyburn as the global city's urbanisation had already swept into the county of Surrey (before the formation of the London County Council 90 years after its last execution). Public executions were conducted frequently in years when the common was also hosting cricket matches. At least 129 men and 12 women were executed on the site. The first was Sarah Elston who was burned at the stake on 24 April 1678 for the killing of her husband. The last was William Badger, a forger, on 5 August 1799.

In 1746, the Jacobite officer Francis Towneley, along with other members of the Manchester Regiment, who had been captured during the failed Jacobite rising of 1745, were convicted of high treason and condemned to be hanged, drawn and quartered on the common on 30 July. However, by then executioners possessed some discretion as to how much the condemned should suffer before death. Towneley was killed before his body was eviscerated. His head was placed on a pike on Temple Bar.

== 19th century to present ==
The common continued to stage executions until the end of the 18th century while fairs, orators, and other popular events continued into the 19th century. The lords of the manor and church of the parish were allowed to enclose some of the land in the 19th century. Under a scheme sponsored by the royal family, the remainder of the common was enclosed in the mid-19th century.

Kennington Park, which opened in 1854, was created using the land between Kennington Park Road and St Agnes Place. However, with the growth of London throughout the hundred years, the remaining parts of the common have been consumed by urbanisation. Cricket remains at Kennington. In 1845, the newly formed Surrey County Cricket Club established Kennington Oval on a part of the old common that had been used as a market garden.

== Bibliography ==
- ACS (1981). A Guide to Important Cricket Matches Played in the British Isles 1709–1863. Nottingham: ACS. OCLC 85045528.
- Ashley-Cooper, F. S. (1929). Kent Cricket Matches, 1719–1880. Canterbury: Gibbs & Sons. OCLC 220674085.
- Buckley, G. B. (1935). Fresh Light on 18th Century Cricket. Birmingham: Cotterell & Co. OCLC 23450280.
- Dallimore, Arnold (1979). George Whitefield. The life and times of the great evangelist of the 18th century revival. Edinburgh: Banner of Truth Trust. ISBN 978-08-51510-26-2.
- James Sexby, John (2014). The Municipal Parks, Gardens, and Open Spaces of London: Their History and Associations. Cambridge University Press. ISBN 978-11-08076-13-5.
- Maun, Ian (2009). From Commons to Lord's, Volume One: 1700 to 1750. Cambridge: Roger Heavens. ISBN 978-19-00592-52-9.
- Pepys, Samuel (1893) [1825]. The Diary of Samuel Pepys. New York City: Croscup & Sterling Company. OCLC 404927.
- Timbs, John (2021) [1867]. Curiosities of London. Sligo, Ireland: HardPress Publishing. ISBN 978-03-71926-74-1.
- Waghorn, H. T. (1899). Cricket Scores, Notes, &c. From 1730–1773. Edinburgh: Blackwood. OCLC 1086375331.
- Waghorn, H. T. (2005) [1906]. The Dawn of Cricket. London: J. W. McKenzie. ISBN 978-09-47821-17-3.
