= Mars (disambiguation) =

Mars is the fourth planet from the Sun.

Mars also commonly refers to:

- Mars (mythology), the Ancient Roman god of war, equivalent to the Greek god Ares
- Mars Inc., a confectioner and food company
  - Mars bar, a chocolate treat produced by Mars, Inc.

Mars may also refer to:

== Biology and medicine ==
- MARS (gene), a human enzyme
- Medication Administration Record Sheet
- MARS, the Molecular Adsorbents Recirculation System for liver dialysis

== Places ==
=== Australia ===
- Mars, New South Wales

=== Canada ===
- MaRS Discovery District, a scientific research centre in Toronto
- McGill Arctic Research Station, abbreviated as MARS, in Nunavut

=== France ===
- Mars, Ardèche
- Mars-sous-Bourcq, Ardennes
- Mars, Gard
- Mars, Loire
- Mars-la-Tour, Meurthe-et-Moselle
- Mars-sur-Allier, Nièvre

=== United States ===
- Monterey Accelerated Research System, a cabled-based ocean observatory in Monterey Bay, California
- Mars, California, a populated place
- Mars Bluff, South Carolina, an unincorporated community
- Outingdale, California, formerly called Mars, a populated place
- Le Mars, Iowa, a city in and the county seat of Plymouth County
- Mars Hill, Maine, a town
- Mars Hotel (Arches National Park), a summit in Utah
- Mars, Nebraska, a ghost town
- Mars, Pennsylvania, a borough
- Mars, Texas, a ghost town

=== Ukraine ===
- Mars, Ukraine, a village in Novhorod-Siverskyi Raion, Chernihiv Oblast

=== Other places ===
- Mars Glacier, Alexander Island, Antarctica

== Media, music and arts ==
=== Fictional entities ===
- Mars (Black Clover), a character in Black Clover
- Mars (Biker Mice from Mars), the planet as it appears in Biker Mice from Mars
- Military Armament Research Syndicate, a fictional organization in the G.I. Joe universe
- St. Marcus Mars, a character in One Piece
- Mars or Scarface, an Ultimate Muscle character
- The Megaversity Association for Reenactments and Simulations, a fictional association in The Big U
- Mars the Dog, canine star of A Dog's Breakfast

=== Film and television ===
- Mars (1930 film), an animated short film in the Oswald the Lucky Rabbit series
- Mars (1968 film), a soviet science education/fiction film
- Mars (1997 film), a film starring Shari Belafonte
- Mars (1998 film), a film starring Olivier Gruner
- Mars (2004 film), a Russian film set in Mars, a small town on the Black Sea
- Mars (2010 film), a 2010 animated film
- Mars (2024 film), an animated film starring The Whitest Kids U' Know
- Mars (American TV series), a 2016 docudrama science fiction series
- Mars (Taiwanese TV series), a 2004 drama series based on the manga by Fuyumi Soryo
- Mars (talk show), a Philippine female talk show on GMA News TV and GMA
- Mars: Zero's Rebellion, a 2024 drama series starring Shunsuke Michieda

=== Literature ===
- Mars (Fritz Zorn), a 1976 autobiographical essay by Fritz Angst
- Mars (comics), a comic book series
- Mars (1976 manga), a 1976 manga series by Mitsuteru Yokoyama
- Mars (manga), a 1996 manga series by Fuyumi Soryo
- Mars trilogy, three science fiction novels by Kim Stanley Robinson
- Mars, a novel by Ben Bova in the Grand Tour series
- Mars, 1976 manga series by Mitsuteru Yokoyama
- The Mars Project, a non-fiction science book by Wernher von Braun
- Project Mars: A Technical Tale, a science fiction novel by Wernher von Braun

=== Music albums ===
- Mars (B'z album)
- Mars (Gackt album)
- Mars, disk two of the Red Hot Chili Peppers double album Stadium Arcadium
- Mars, an album by Sinkane

=== Music groups ===
- Mars Music, a now defunct American music store chain
- Mars (band), a No Wave band
- M.A.R.S., a heavy metal supergroup that released the 1986 album Project Driver
- MARRS, British electronic music group

=== Songs and movements ===
- "Mars" (song), a 2008 single by Fake Blood
- "Mars, the Bringer of War", a movement in Holst's The Planets
- "Mars", a song by Jay Sean from Neon
- "Mars", a song by Mario from Closer to Mars
- "Mars", a song by Soulfly from Prophecy
- "Mars", a song by Twice from This Is For

=== Video gaming ===
- Project Mars, codename for the Sega 32X add-on video game console
- Memory Array Redcode Simulator, the environment for the competitive programming game Core War

== Military ==
=== Warships ===
- Dutch frigate Mars, later HMS Mars, a 32-gun frigate built in 1769
- French ship Mars, a list of French warships
  - French privateer Mars (1746), later HMS Mars, a 64-gun third-rate
- German trawler V 621 Mars, a German vorpostenboot in service in 1944
- HMS Mars, a list of ships of the Royal Navy
  - HMS Mars (1759), a 74-gun third rate
  - HMS Mars (1794), a 74-gun third rate
    - Mars-class ship of the line
  - HMS Mars (1848), an 80-gun second rate
  - HMS Mars (1896), a Majestic-class battleship
  - HMS Mars (R76), a Colossus-class aircraft carrier renamed HMS Pioneer in 1944
  - Mars, a planned Minotaur-class cruiser of the Royal Navy, cancelled in 1946
- SMS Mars, a list of ships
  - SMS Mars (1879), a German gunnery training ship
  - SMS Tegetthoff (1878) or SMS Mars, an Austro-Hungarian central battery ship
- Swedish warship Mars, a ship sunk in 1564
- USS Mars, several ships of the US Navy
  - USS Mars (1798), a galley
  - USS Mars (AC-6), launched in 1909
  - USS Mars (AFS-1), launched in 1963
    - Mars-class combat stores ship
- Mars class, several ship classes

=== Other uses in military ===
- MARS (missile), air to ground missile built by Israel Military Industries
- Mars Automatic Pistol, a semi-automatic pistol developed in 1900
- MARS tanker programme, which resulted in the four Tide-class tankers that entered service with the British Royal Fleet Auxiliary from 2017
- Operation Mars, codename of the Second Rzhev-Sychevka Offensive, a Soviet offensive during World War II
- Military Auxiliary Radio System, an auxiliary communications system of amateur radio operators for the US armed forces
- Mittleres Artillerie Raketen System or M270 Multiple Launch Rocket System
- Operation Mars, 28 March 1918 German offensive in World War I, part of the Spring Offensive
- Machine-Assisted Analytic Rapid-Repository System, a US Defense Intelligence Agency data repository

== Organizations and products ==
- Mars (beer), a type of lambic ale
- Mars (motorcycle), a defunct German motorcycle manufacturer
- Mars (oil platform), an oil drilling platform in the Gulf of Mexico
- Mars (supermarket), an American grocery chain
- Icaro Mars, an Italian hang glider design
- MARS Group, a British architectural think tank founded in 1933
- Mauritius Amateur Radio Society
- Mongolian Amateur Radio Society
- Mumbai Amateur Radio Society, Mumbai, India
- Mars Tver, a former name of THK Tver, a minor professional ice hockey club in Tver, Russia

== People ==
=== People with the given name ===
- Mars Argo, stage name of Brittany Sheets, American singer, songwriter, actress, photographer, Internet personality and YouTuber
- Mars Bonfire (born 1943), Canadian musician and songwriter
- Mars Di Bartolomeo (born 1952), Luxembourgish politician
- Mars Ravelo (1916–1988), Filipino comic book cartoonist and graphic novelist

=== Other people ===
- Mars (surname), a list of people with the surname
- Cheung Wing-fat (born 1954), nicknamed Mars, Hong Kong actor, action director, stuntman and martial artist
- Mars (rapper) (born 1980), stage name of Mario Delgado, American horrorcore rapper
- Mars (record producer), moniker of Lamar Edwards from production teams 1500 or Nothin' and Smash Factory
- Jean-Baptiste Belley or Mars (1740s–1805), Senegalese Haitian politician
- Xueyang "Mars" Ma, member of Mandopop boy band Top Combine
- Mars (drag queen), based in Portland, Oregon, US

== Technology ==
- MARS (cipher), a block cipher, IBM's submission for the AES
- Cisco Security Monitoring, Analysis, and Response System, a security monitoring tool for network devices
- Mars computer, a family of PDP-10-compatible digital computers built by Systems Concepts
- Mars program, a series of uncrewed spacecraft launched by the Soviet Union
- Mid-Atlantic Regional Spaceport, a space launch site on Wallops Island, Virginia
- Mars Analogue Research Station Program, of The Mars Society
- Marketing and Reporting Sales system, a customer relationship management software package produced and sold by Phoenix American

== Transportation ==
- Mars Light, an oscillating railroad safety light found on locomotives
- MARS (ticket reservation system), a train seat reservation system used in Japan
- Mars station (Illinois), a Metra commuter rail station in Chicago, Illinois
- JRM Mars, a flying boat
- Mars, a West Cornwall Railway locomotive

== Other uses ==
- Mars (astrology), a set of qualities and influences
- Mars (surname)
  - Mars family, the family that owns Mars, Incorporated
- Multivariate adaptive regression spline, a statistical analysis technique
- Mars (pygmy hippo)

== See also ==
- Ares (disambiguation)
- Colonization of Mars for the Mars colony concept
- Exploration of Mars, for various Mars projects and programmes
- Champ de Mars (disambiguation)
- Field of Mars (disambiguation)
- Mars 1 (disambiguation)
- Mars II (disambiguation)
- Mars Hill (disambiguation)
- Mars station (disambiguation)
- Marrs, an American surname
