= Mars II (disambiguation) =

Mars II is the second moon of Mars.

Mars Two, Mars II, Mars 2 or variant, may also refer to:

- Mars 2, the Soviet spaceprobe for Mars
- HMS Mars (1746), the second ship named HMS Mars
- USS Mars (AC-6), the second ship named USS Mars
- the second volume of Fuyumi Soryo's Mars (manga)
- MARS II / LRU / MLRS-I, a European variant of the M270 Multiple Launch Rocket System
- Methionine–tRNA ligase, mitochondrial, an enzyme encoded by the MARS2 gene

== See also ==
- Mars (disambiguation)
- Mars 2M (disambiguation)
- Mars 2MV-4 (disambiguation)
