= Mars 1 (disambiguation) =

Mars 1 was an early Soviet mission to Mars.

It may also refer to:

- Mars One, a proposed colony on Mars
- Mars One (film), a 2022 Brazilian film
- Phobos (moon), a natural satellite of Mars, systemically designated Mars I
- Mars Orbiter Mission, the first Indian Mars mission
- Yinghuo-1 (Chinese: 螢火-1), the first attempted Chinese mission to Mars
- Tianwen-1 (formerly Huoxing-1 Chinese: 火星-1; lit. 'Mars One'), first Chinese space probe to reach Mars
- USS Mars (1798), the first USS Mars
- HMS Mars (1665), the first HMS Mars
- MARS (gene), a gene which is also denoted MARS1
- the first volume of Fuyumi Soryo's Mars (manga)

== See also ==
- Mars 1M, Soviet spacecraft
- Mars (disambiguation)
- Marsi (disambiguation)
- Marsone (disambiguation)
