= French ship Mars =

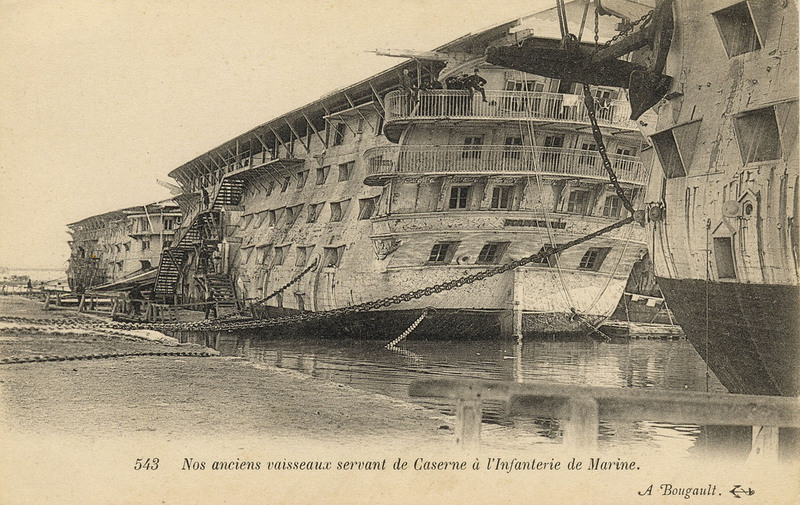
The 1860 French ship Mars (left) used as an accommodation hulk together with the Souverain and the Eylau (centre and right).

Several ships of the French Navy have borne the name Mars, after Mars, the Roman god of war:

- French ship Mars (1705), broken up in 1721. Claude de Forbin's 60-gun flagship at the Battle of Beachy Head (1707).
- French ship Mars (1740), captured by HMS Nottingham off Cape Clear in 1746 and taken into service as HMS Mars. She was wrecked in 1755 near Halifax, Nova Scotia.
- Mars (1762), wrecked in 1765.
- French ship Mars (1770), burnt in 1773.
- Mars (1860), laid down in 1835 as Sceptre, renamed Masséna in 1840, redesigned as a screw steamer in 1856, launched and completed in 1860. Stricken in 1881 and used as an accommodation hulk at Toulon, renamed Mars in 1892. Broken up for scrap in 1906.

== Privateers ==
Several French privateers also bore the name.

- Mars (1746), involved in the Skirmish of Loch nan Uamh on 2 May 1746 during the Jacobite rising and was captured by HMS Dreadnought off Cape Clear in 1747.
- Mars (1798), captured by HMS Amethyst on 31 March 1800 and taken into service as HMS Garland and served on the Jamaica Station. She was wrecked in 1803, upon Caracole reef off Cap François.

== See also ==
- Mars (disambiguation)
