= Skirmish of Loch nan Uamh =

1746 skirmish

- Part of the Jacobite rising of 1745
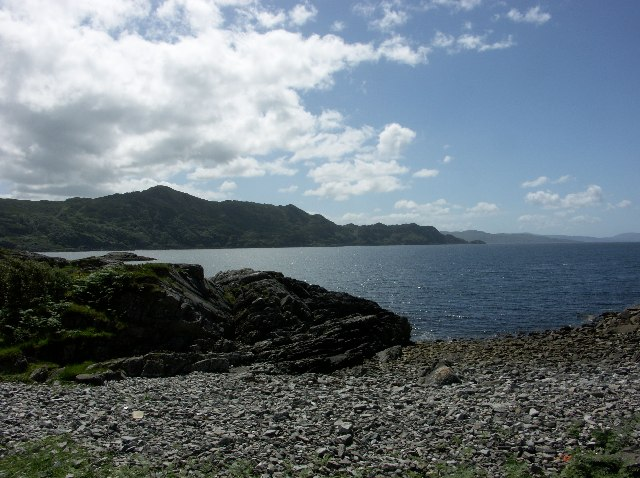
- Loch nan Uamh
Date	2 May 1746
Location	Loch nan Uamh, Scottish Highlands
Result	Jacobite ships retreat

Belligerents
(Kingdom of Great Britain) British-Hanoverians from Royal Navy	Jacobites from: French privateers

Commanders and leaders
(Kingdom of Great Britain) Captain Noel	Captain Rouillee; Captain Lorry

Strength
Three sloops-of-war (smaller than the two French frigates)	Two frigates

Casualties and losses
Unknown	29 men killed and 85 wounded

The Skirmish of Loch nan Uamh was a conflict that took place on 2 May 1746 and was part of the Jacobite rising of 1745. It was fought by the British Royal Navy against French privateers who were supporting the Jacobite rebels.

== Background ==
Following the Jacobite defeat at the Battle of Culloden on 16 April 1746, two French privateer ships from Nantes (south of Brittany), Le Le Mars and La La Bellone arrived at Loch nan Uamh and anchored there on 30 April 1746. As they were privateers, their emblem was a black cockade which also happened to be the emblem of the British-Hanoverian supporters and as such the Jacobites on shore fired upon them. However, the privateers raised the French flag and the mistake was realized and sorted out. Le Mars was reluctant to unload her supplies (the Loch Arkaig treasure) as the British Navy was approaching and she took on board some escaping Jacobites including James Drummond, 3rd Duke of Perth and Sir Thomas Sheridan.

== Skirmish ==
On 2 May 1746 three British ships crept into the loch. As the British Government ships approached Captain Antoine Rouillé of Le Mars decided to stay at anchor, but Captain Claude Lory of the La Bellone set sail. This allowed the Royal Navy's HMS Greyhound to give Le Mars a broadside at close quarters which caused great loss of life: Nearly a score of privateers were killed and according to eyewitnesses her decks were awash with blood. The crew panicked and had to be forced back to duty. The La Bellone and HMS Greyhound then attacked each other and the mast of the La Bellone was broken with a broadside. There was an attempt to board the La Bellone but she gave HMS Greyhound two broadsides. HMS Greyhound had to move out of range and this allowed Le Mars to set sail. HMS Terror tried to stop Le Mars but a volley from La Bellone disabled her. Le Mars was then led by La Bellone out to a bay at the head of Loch nan Uamh, where Le Mars started her repairs, and La Bellone engaged the British ships. Hundreds of spectators came to the shore to watch the battle, whom HMS Greyhound fired upon to try to stop them carrying away the gold and cargo that had been unloaded by the Breton ships. HMS Baltimore along with HMS Greyhound and HMS Terror tried to board the Breton ships, but HMS Baltimore's captain sustained a head wound and her rigging was shattered. She also lost her anchor and two of her masts. HMS Baltimore then headed for The Minch to get help while the La Bellone hit HMS Greyhound's main mast and set fire to her hand grenades. Le Mars was in a bad state having been hit six times above the water line, seven times below the water line and with three feet of water in her hold. Le Mars had also suffered 29 men killed and 85 men wounded.

== Aftermath ==
The French ships escaped, but another French ship returned in September and successfully rescued the Jacobite leader Charles Edward Stuart who had been in hiding. Both French privateers were captured the following year by the Royal Navy.

== See also ==
- Jacobite risings
- Jacobite rising of 1745
- Charles Edward Stuart
- Battle of Culloden
