= USS Mars =

USS Mars may refer to the following ships operated by the United States Navy:

- USS Mars (1798), was a galley built in 1798 and renamed Charleston while under construction
- USS Mars (AC-6), was launched 10 April 1909 and sold 22 June 1923
- USS Mars AR-16, was laid down 16 May 1945 but construction was canceled 12 August 1945
- USS Mars (AFS-1), was launched 15 June 1963 and decommissioned 1 February 1993

== See also ==
- Mars-class combat stores ship
- Mars (disambiguation)
