= John Amherst =

Royal Navy Admiral (1718–1778)

Admiral John Amherst
- Born: 1718
- Died: 14 February 1778 (aged 59–60); Gosport, Hampshire
- Burial place: Sevenoaks, Kent
- Relatives: William Amherst (brother); Jeffery Amherst (brother)
- Military career
- Allegiance: Great Britain
- Branch: Royal Navy
- Service years: 1730–1778
- Rank: Admiral of the Blue
- Commands: Preston; Mars; Deptford; Captain; Arrogant
- Conflicts: First Carnatic War; Seven Years' War

Admiral John Amherst (1718 – 14 February 1778) was a Royal Navy officer served during the First Carnatic War and the Seven Years' War, and who went on to be Commander-in-Chief, Plymouth.

== Family ==
He was the fourth son of lawyer Jeffrey Amherst and Elizabeth Kerrill, of Riverhead, Kent, and his older brothers included Field Marshal Jeffery Amherst, 1st Baron Amherst, and Lieutenant-General William Amherst.

== Naval career ==
Amherst joined the Royal Navy in 1730, and after serving as midshipman and lieutenant in the Mediterranean Fleet under the command of Admirals Nicholas Haddock and Thomas Mathews, he was promoted to the rank of captain in December 1744.

In 1746, during the First Carnatic War, Amherst was appointed commander of the 50-gun Preston, and served as flag captain to Rear-Admiral Thomas Griffin, on board the Princess Mary in the East Indies.

In 1753 he commissioned the 64-gun Mars which formed part of the fleet sent into North American waters under Vice-Admiral Edward Boscawen in 1755. On entering Halifax Harbour, Mars ran aground, and was wrecked. Amherst was court-martialled, but subsequently acquitted.

On his return to England, was appointed to command the 50-gun Deptford, which sailed with Admiral John Byng to the Mediterranean in March 1756. In the Battle of Minorca, off Cape Mola on 20 May, the admiral ordered the Deptford to quit the line of battle, to be ready to assist any ship, as directed. Amherst took no part in the battle, except to assist the disabled Intrepid. The following year he commanded the 64-gun Captain during the Louisbourg Expedition, under Francis Holburne and Boscawen; and in 1761 commanded the 74-gun ship Arrogant at the capture of Belle Île.

Afterwards, in 1762, he flew his broad pennant as senior officer at Gibraltar. In 1765 he was advanced to flag rank, and in 1776 was appointed Commander-in-Chief, Plymouth. He was still holding this command, when he died suddenly at Gosport, on 14 February 1778, in his 59th year. He was buried in the parish church of Sevenoaks, Kent.

== Family ==
He married Anne Linzee.

== Notes ==
Military offices
Preceded by Sir Richard Spry	Commander-in-Chief, Plymouth; 1776–1778	Succeeded by Sir Molyneux Shuldham
