= Marrs =

Marrs is a surname. Notable persons with that name include:

- Anna Marrs (born 1974), American banker
- Audrey Marrs (born 1970), American film producer
- Elijah P. Marrs (1840–1910), American minister and educator
- Jarrod Marrs (born 1975), American breaststroke swimmer
- Jim Marrs (1943–2017), American journalist and conspiracy theorist
- Lee Marrs (born 1945), American comic book writer and animator
- Steven Marrs (born 1967), American TV producer
- Texe Marrs (1944–2019), American author and researcher

== See also ==
- Marrs Township, Posey County, Indiana, a township
- Marrs Hill Township, Washington County, Arkansas, a township
- Marrs Center, Indiana, an unincorporated community
- MARRS, British electronic music group
- Mars (disambiguation)
