= Mars Hill =

Mars Hill may refer to:

== Places ==
- The Areopagus, in classical Athens, the first Mars Hill
- Mars Hills, Antarctica; a range of hills

United States

- Mars Hill, Alabama
- Mars Hill, Georgia
- Mars Hill (Iowa), a log church in Wapello County, Iowa; listed on the National Register of Historic Places
- Mars Hill, Maine, a New England town
  - Mars Hill (CDP), Maine, the primary settlement in the town
  - Mars Hill (Maine), prominent hill in the town
- Mars Hill, North Carolina
- Mars Hill, site of Lowell Observatory, Flagstaff, Arizona
- Mars Hill, neighborhood in Indianapolis, Indiana

== Organizations ==
- Mars' Hill, the student newspaper of Trinity Western University
- Mars Hill Academy (Mason, OH), a school in Mason, Ohio
- Mars Hill Audio, a Christian publisher of audio materials, including a bimonthly journal
- Mars Hill Bible Church, a large church in Grandville, Michigan, once pastored by Rob Bell
- Mars Hill Bible School, a primary and secondary school in Florence, Alabama
- Mars Hill Church, a former large church in Seattle, Washington, pastored by Mark Driscoll
- Mars Hill Graduate School, a Christian graduate school in Seattle, Washington
- Mars Hill Network, a Christian radio network in New York
- Mars Hill University, formerly Mars Hill College, a four-year university in Mars Hill, North Carolina

== See also ==
- List of mountains on Mars
- Mars Mountain
- Mount Mars
- Mars (disambiguation)
- Mars Hill Crossroads (disambiguation)
