= Mars Hill Crossroads =

Mars Hill Crossroads may refer to:

- Mars Hill Crossroads, Dooly County, Georgia
- Mars Hill Crossroads, Forsyth County, Georgia
