= Mars 2M =

Mars 2M may refer to:

- Mars 2M No.521, Soviet Mars probe
- Mars 2M No.522, Soviet Mars probe

== See also ==
- Mars 2MV-4 (disambiguation)
- Mars II (disambiguation)
