= Mars class =

Mars class may refer to:

== Real ship and boat classes ==
- Mars-class combat stores ship (20th century) of the U.S. Navy
- Mars-class ship of the line (18th century; 74-gun third rate) of the British Royal Navy
- Mars-class 64-gun ship of the line (18th century) of the Royal French Navy; see List of ships of the line of France
- MARS-class tanker (Military Afloat Reach and Sustainability; 20th century) of the Royal Fleet Auxiliary of the British Royal Navy

== Fictional ship and boat classes ==
- Mars-class starship, of the Federation Starfleet in Star Trek; see Star Trek: Discovery (season 3)

== See also ==
- Human mission to Mars, for proposed Mars-capable (Mars "class", "Mars" ship) spaceship designs
- Mars (disambiguation)
