= Methionine–tRNA ligase =

Class of enzymes

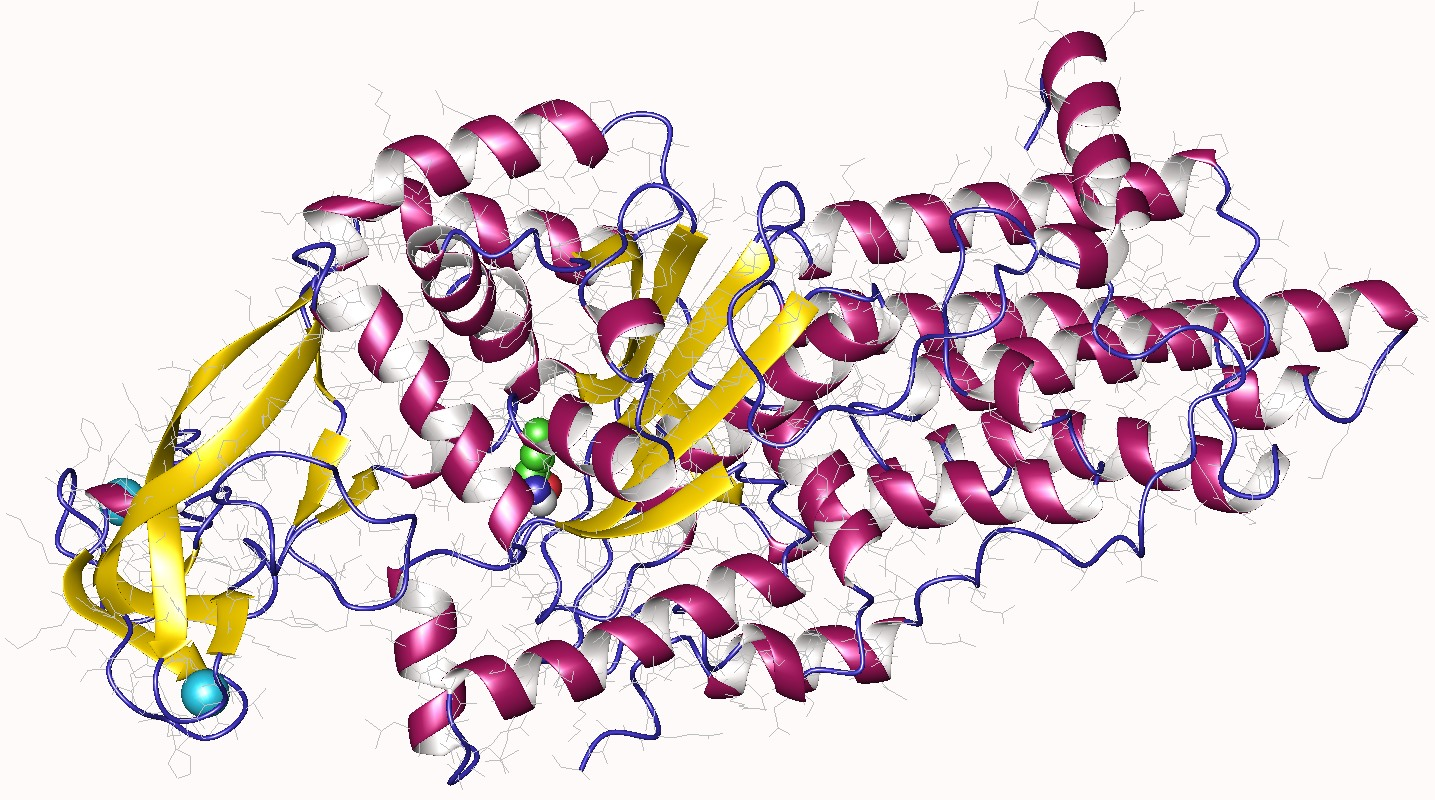
- Methionine–tRNA ligase monomer, Human

Identifiers
- EC no.: 6.1.1.10
- CAS no.: 9033-22-1

Databases
- BRENDA: enzyme data
- ExPASy: NiceZyme view
- KEGG: enzyme entry
- MetaCyc: metabolic pathway
- Rhea: reactions
- PDB structures: RCSB PDB PDBe PDBsum
- Gene Ontology: AmiGO / QuickGO
Search
- PMC: articles
- PubMed: articles
- NCBI: proteins

In enzymology, a methionine–tRNA ligase (EC 6.1.1.10) is an enzyme that catalyzes the chemical reaction

ATP + L-methionine + tRNA^{Met} $\rightleftharpoons$ AMP + diphosphate + L-methionyl-tRNA^{Met}

The 3 substrates of this enzyme are ATP, L-methionine, and tRNA^{Met}, whereas its 3 products are AMP, diphosphate, and L-methionyl-tRNA^{Met}.

Humans have separate cytoplasmic and mitochondrial isozymes, encoded by the genes MARS1 and MARS2 respectively, which is similar to many of the other aminoacyl-tRNA synthetases.

This enzyme belongs to the family of ligases, to be specific those forming carbon–oxygen bonds in aminoacyl-tRNA and related compounds. The systematic name of this enzyme class is L-methionine:tRNA^{Met} ligase (AMP-forming). Other names in common use include methionyl-tRNA synthetase, methionyl-transfer ribonucleic acid synthetase, methionyl-transfer ribonucleate synthetase, methionyl-transfer RNA synthetase, methionine translase, and MetRS. This enzyme participates in 3 metabolic pathways: methionine metabolism, selenoamino acid metabolism, and aminoacyl-tRNA biosynthesis.

== Role in oxidative stress ==
During oxidative stress, methionine–tRNA ligase might be phosphorylated, which results in promiscuity of this enzyme, where it aminoacylates methionine to various non-Met tRNAs. This in turn leads to substitution of amino acids in proteins with methionine, which helps relieve oxidative stress in the cell.

== Structural studies ==
As of late 2007, 21 structures have been solved for this class of enzymes, with PDB accession codes PDB: 1A8H, PDB: 1F4L, PDB: 1MEA, PDB: 1MED, PDB: 1MKH, PDB: 1P7P, PDB: 1PFU, PDB: 1PFV, PDB: 1PFW, PDB: 1PFY, PDB: 1PG0, PDB: 1PG2, PDB: 1QQT, PDB: 1RQG, PDB: 1WOY, PDB: 2CSX, PDB: 2CT8, PDB: 2D54, PDB: 2D5B, PDB: 2DJV, and PDB: 2HSN.
