= Mars Hotel (Arches National Park) =

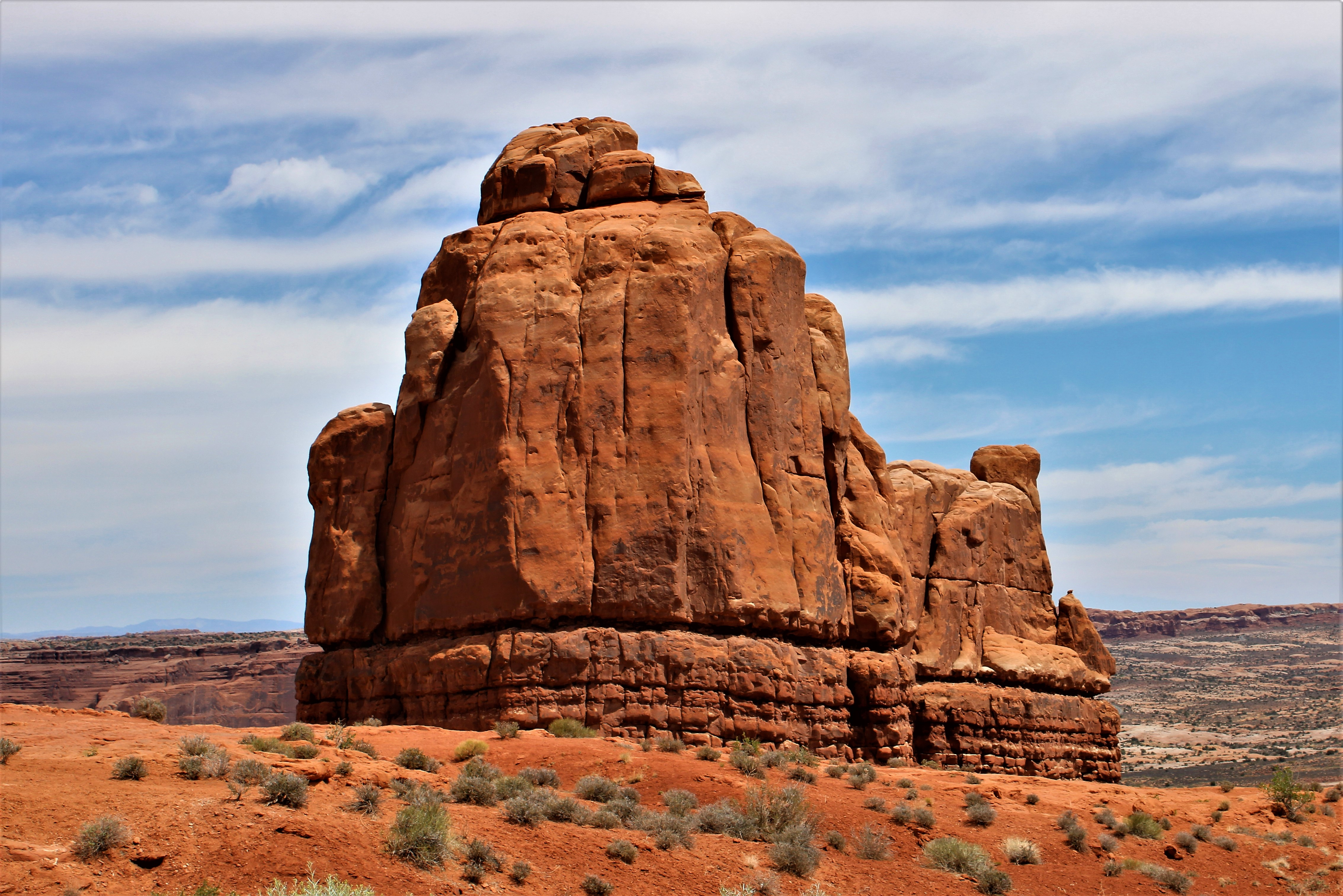
- South aspect

Highest point
- Elevation: 4,635 ft (1,413 m)
- Prominence: 215 ft (66 m)
- Isolation: 0.3 mi (0.48 km)
- Coordinates: 38°37′43″N 109°35′29″W

Geography
- Location within Utah Location within the United States
- Country: United States
- State: Utah
- County: Grand
- Protected area: Arches National Park
- Parent range: Colorado Plateau
- Topo map: USGS The Windows Section

Geology
- Rock age: Jurassic
- Rock type: Entrada Sandstone

Climbing
- First ascent: 1989

Mars Hotel is a 4,635-foot-elevation (1,413-meter) summit in Grand County, Utah, United States.

== Description ==
Mars Hotel is located within Arches National Park, and like many of the rock formations in the park, it is composed of Entrada Sandstone, specifically the Slick Rock Member overlaying the Dewey Bridge Member. It is among the first features that the main park road passes by. Topographic relief is significant as the summit rises approximately 250 feet (76 meters) above the surrounding terrain in 500 feet (152 meters) laterally. Precipitation runoff from Mars Hotel drains to the nearby Colorado River via Courthouse Wash. The first ascent of the summit was made in March 1989 by Kyle Copeland and Eric Johnson via the If I Only Had A Brain rock-climbing route (class 5.10). Mike Baker and Leslie Henderson climbed a new route in 1992 on the east face, Lost in Space (class 5.10+).

== Climate ==
According to the Köppen climate classification system, Mars Hotel is located in a cold semi-arid climate zone with cold winters and hot summers. Spring and fall are the most favorable seasons to experience Arches National Park, when highs average 60 to 80 °F (15 to 25 °C) and lows average 30 to 50 °F (0 to 10 °C). Summer temperatures often exceed 100 °F (40 °C). Winters are cold, with highs averaging 30 to 50 °F (0 to 10 °C), and lows averaging 0 to 20 °F (−20 to −5 °C). As part of a high desert region, it can experience wide daily temperature fluctuations. The park receives an average of less than 10 inches (25 cm) of rain annually.

== Gallery ==
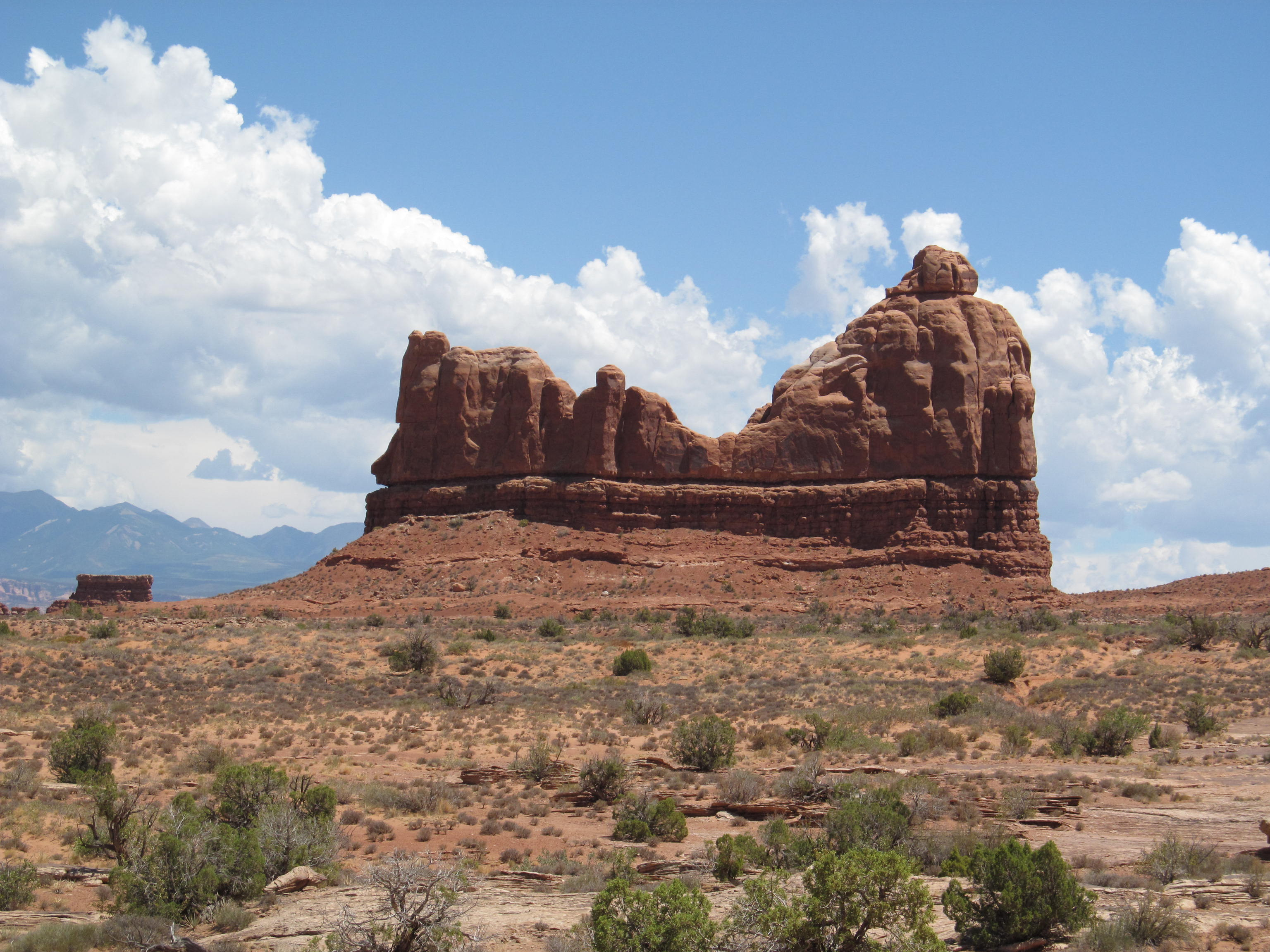
West aspect

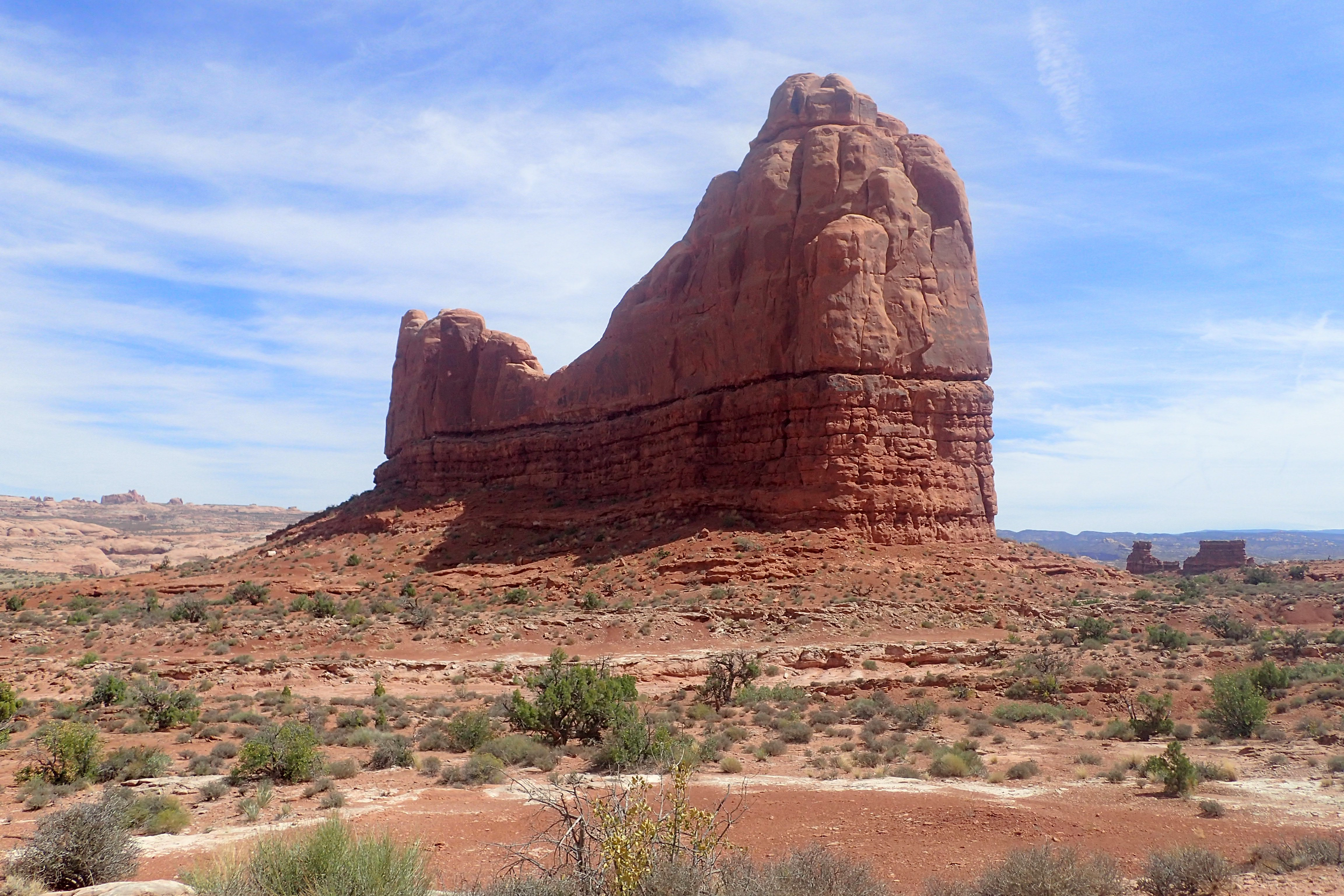
Southwest aspect

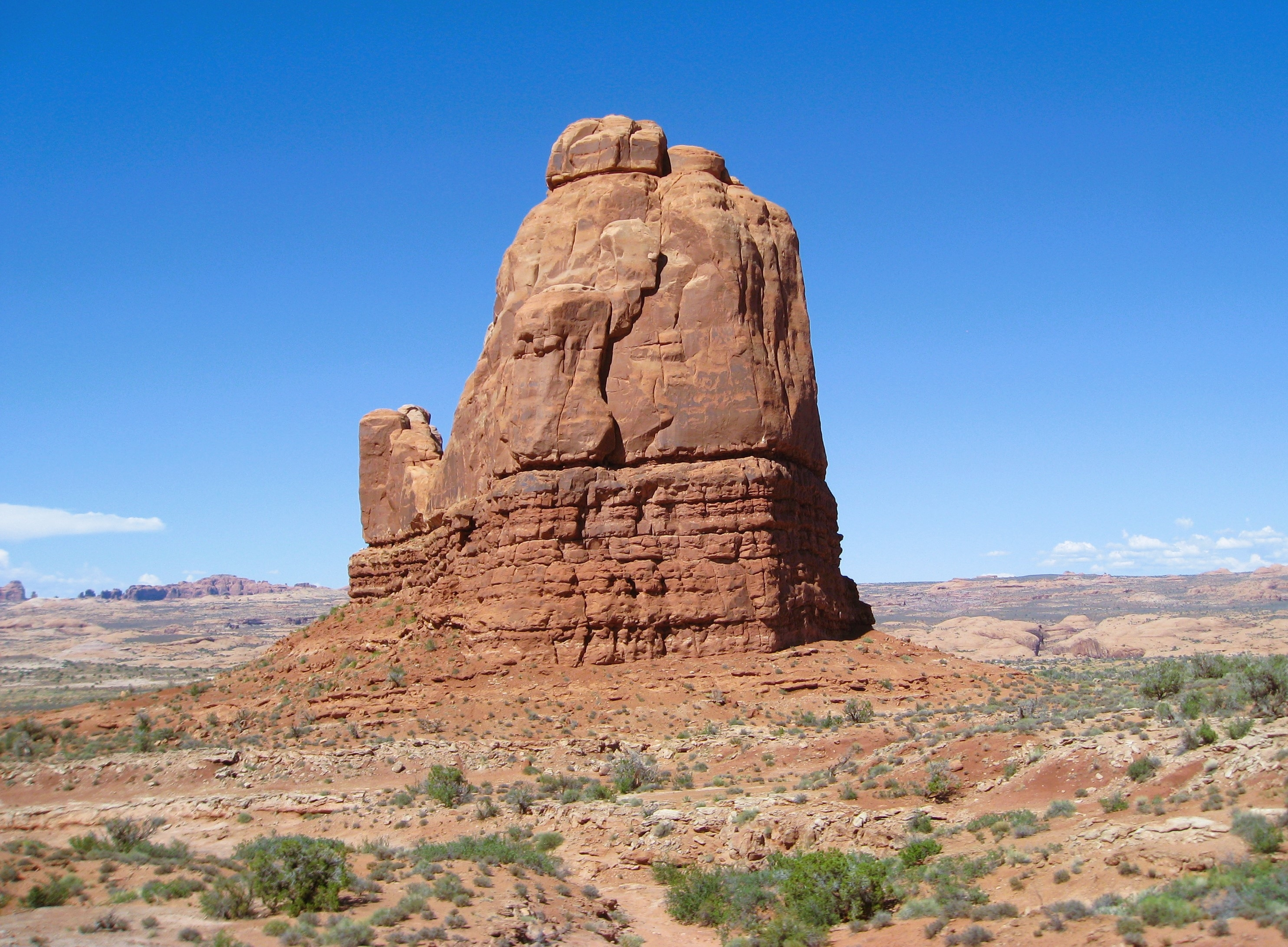
Southwest aspect

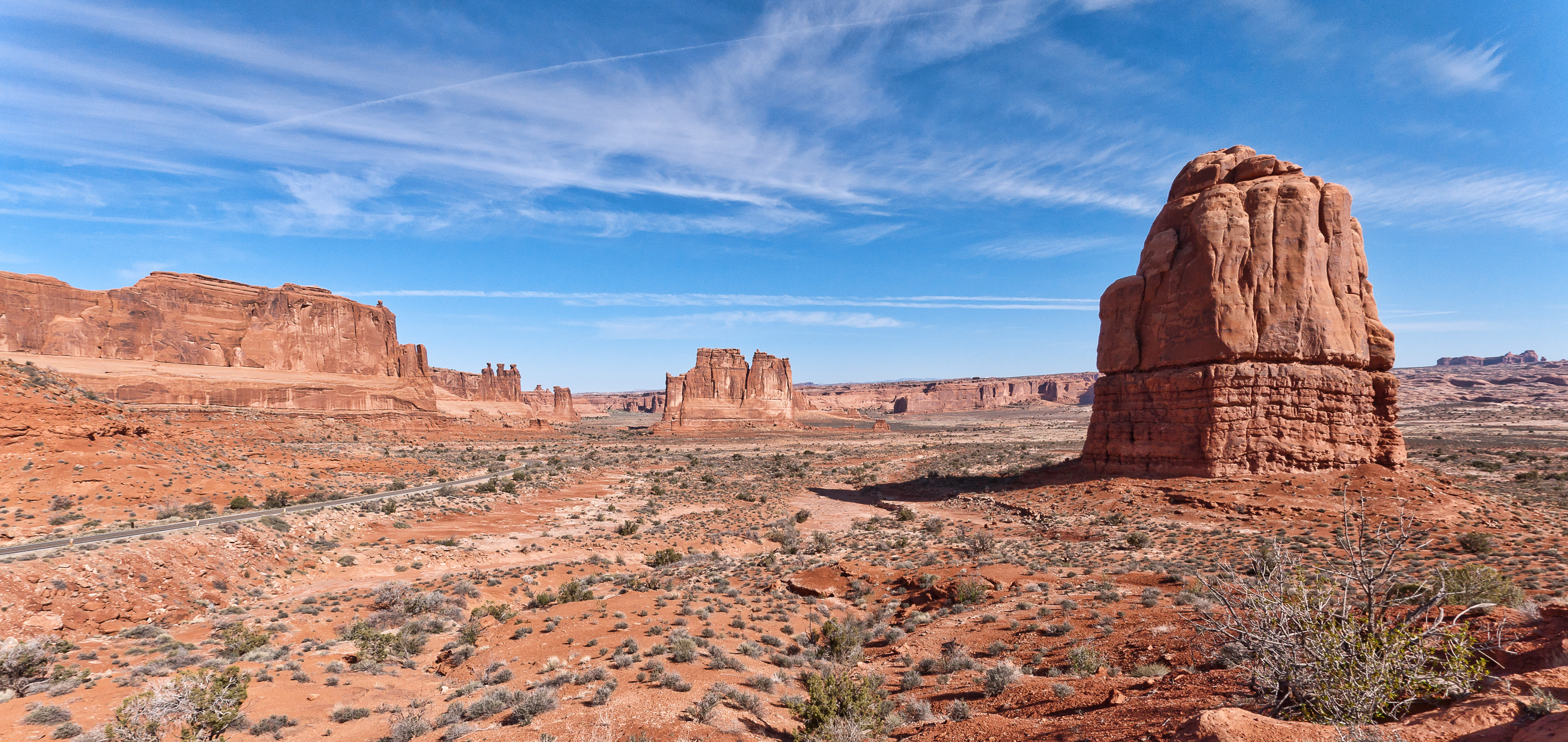
The Organ (centered) and Mars Hotel (right)

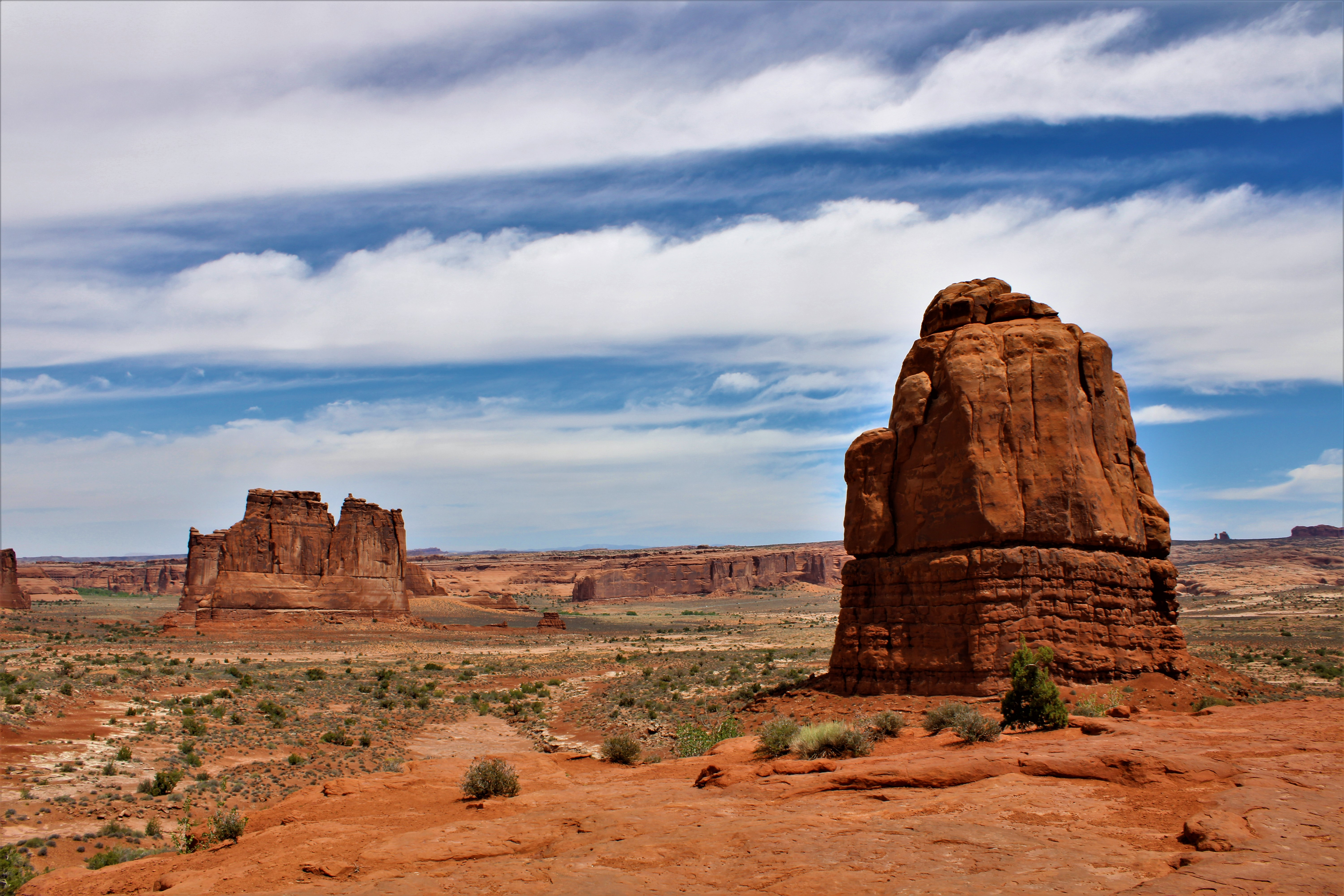
The Organ (left) and Mars Hotel (right)

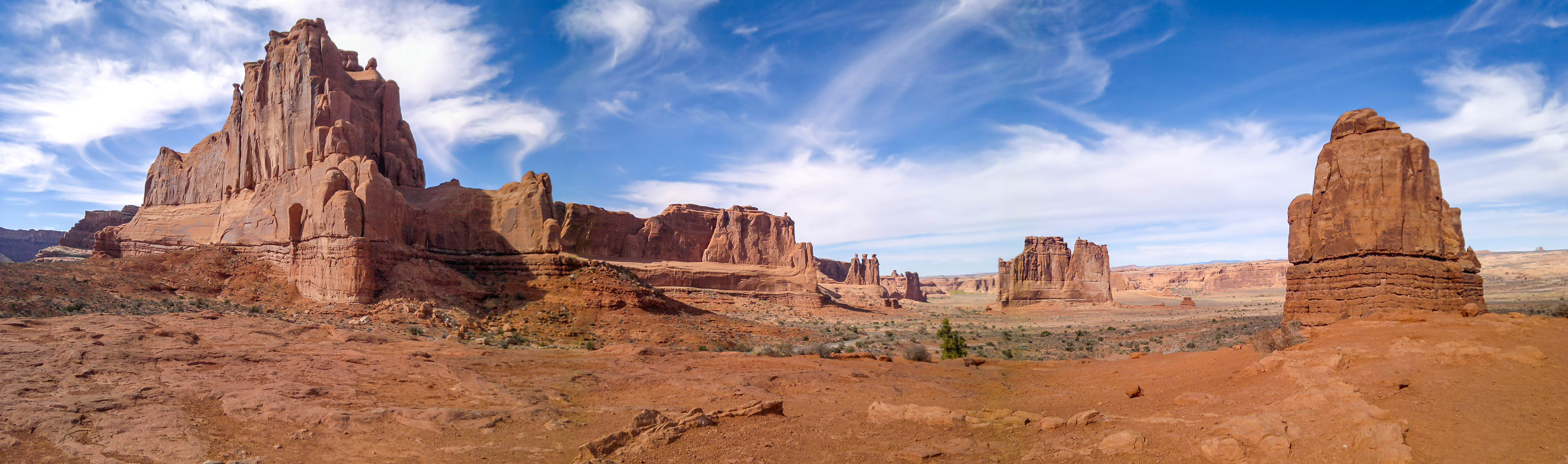
Mars Hotel to the right

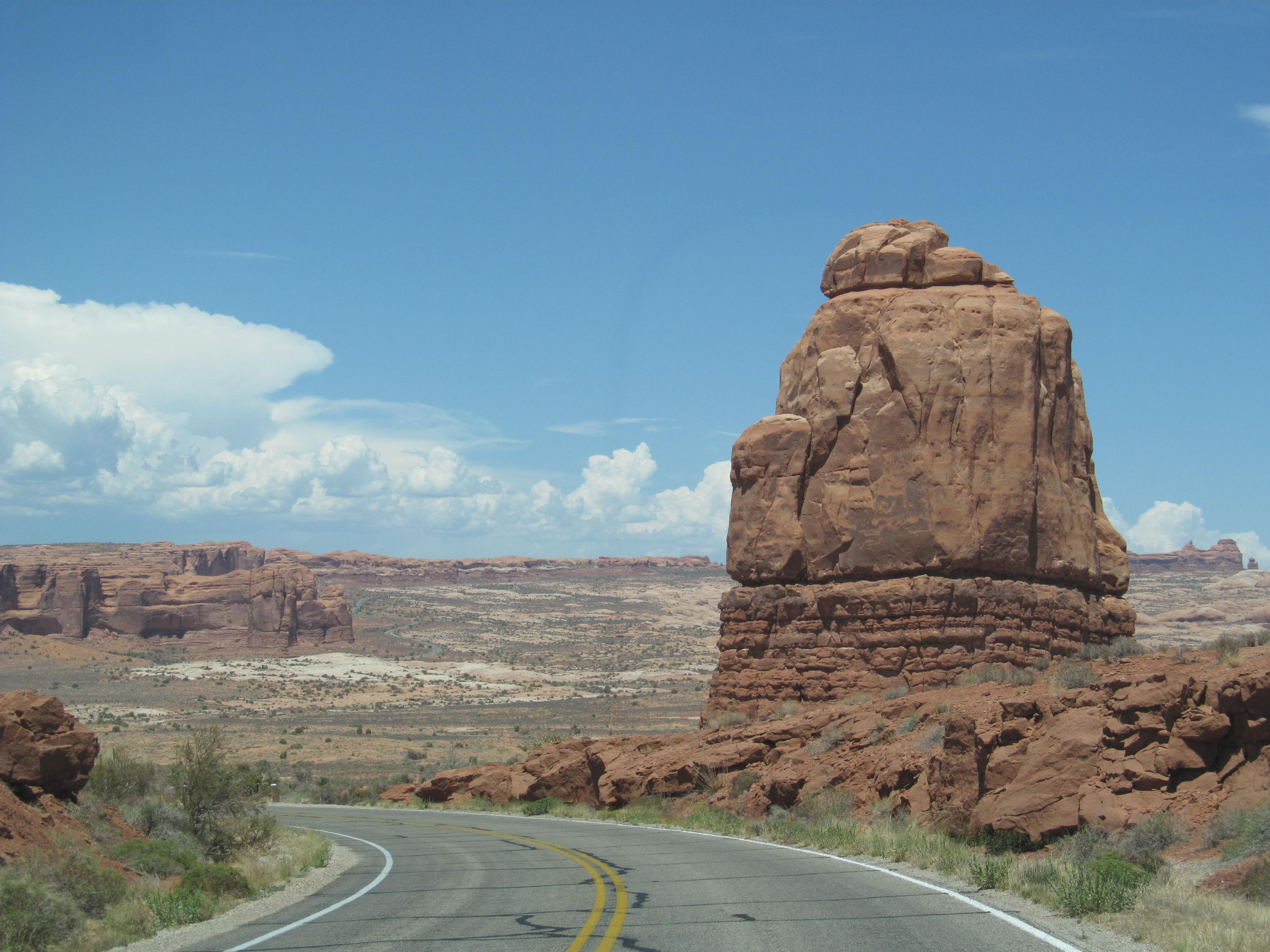
South aspect

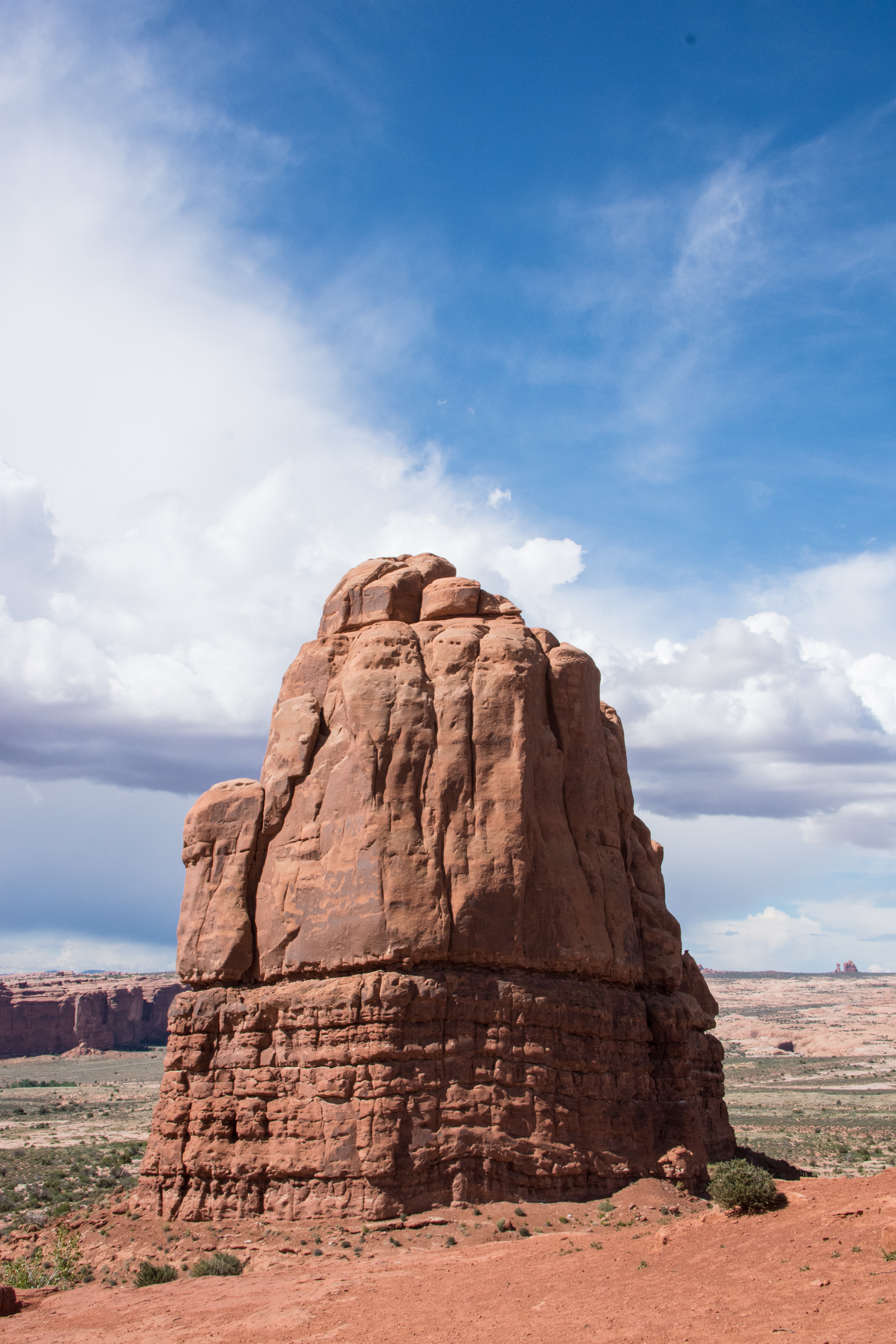
South aspect

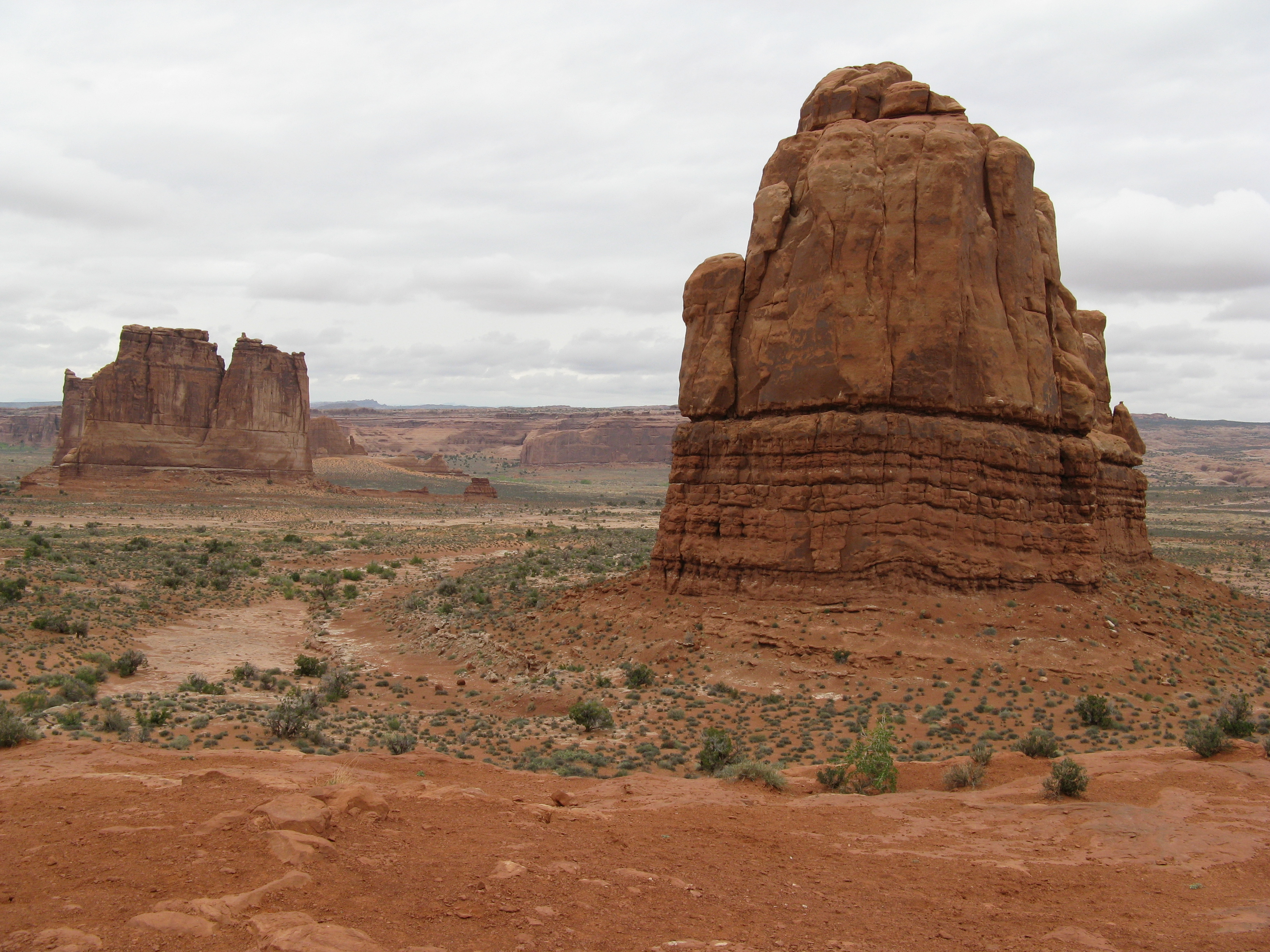
The Organ (left) and Mars Hotel (right)

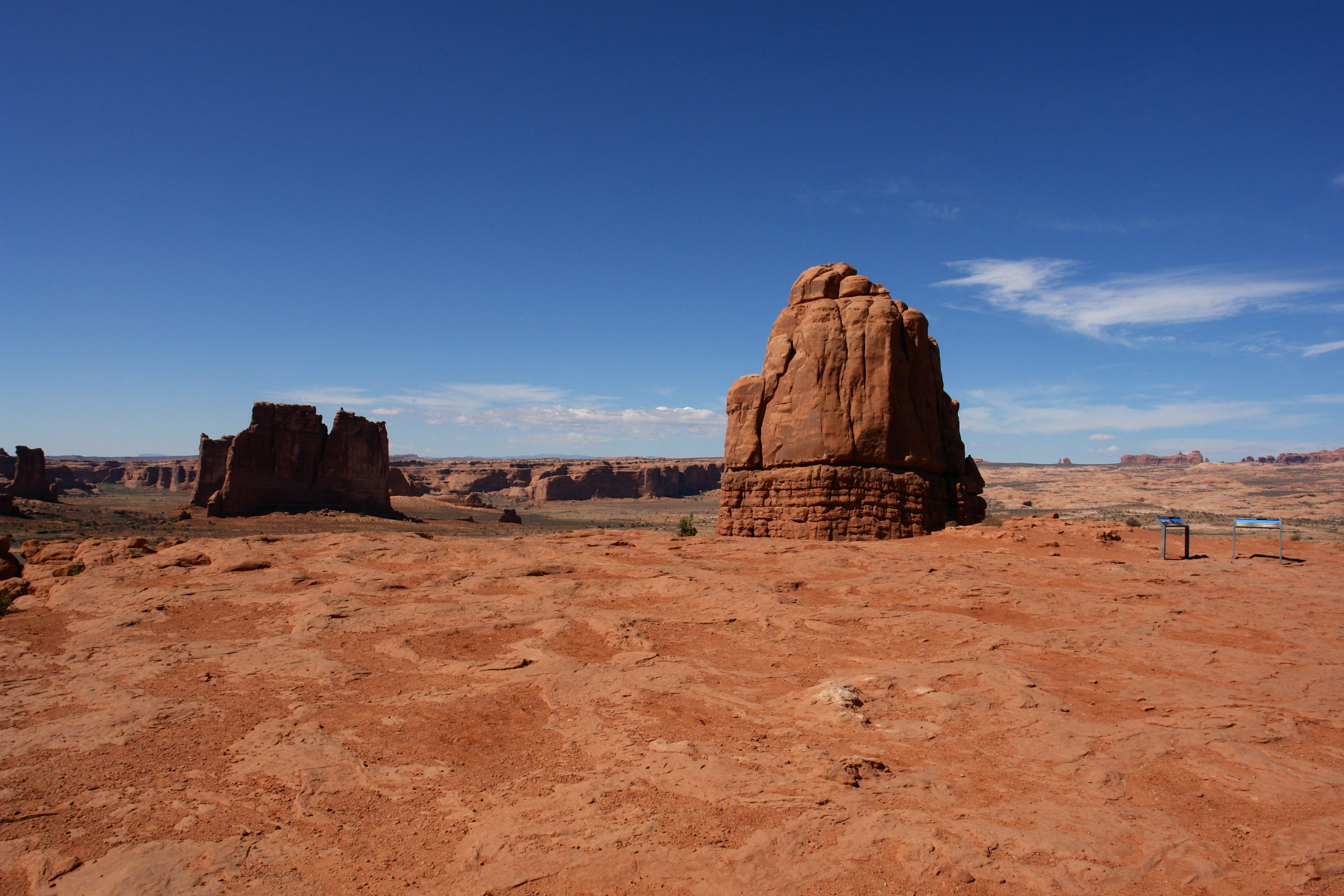
South aspect (right)

== See also ==
- Geology of Utah
- From the Mars Hotel
