= Mars Station =

Mars Station may refer to:

== Train stations ==
- Gare du Champ de Mars, Paris, France (Mars Field train station)
- Gare de Port-Saint-Père-Saint-Mars, the Saint-Mars station in France
- Mars Station, Pennsylvania, Mars, Pennsylvania, US
- Champ-de-Mars station (Montreal Metro), Quebec, Canada (Mars Field subway station)
- Mars station (Illinois), Chicago, Illinois, US

== Planet Mars ==
- Exploration of Mars, for robotic planet Mars stations
- Mars habitat
  - List of Mars analogs, for Mars-analogue stations on Earth
    - Mars Analogue Research Station Program, an Earth station analogue of a Mars station from The Mars Society
  - Colonization of Mars, for proposed Mars space stations and colony stations

== See also ==
- Mars (disambiguation)
