= French privateer Mars (1746) =

History

France
- Name: Mars
- Namesake: Mars (mythology)
- Fate: Captured by HMS Dreadnought in 1747

General characteristics
- Propulsion: Sail
- Sail plan: ship-rigged

Mars, was a French privateer. Mars was involved in a naval battle in Loch nan Uamh during the Jacobite rising. HMS Dreadnought captured her off Cape Clear in 1747.

== History ==
Following the Jacobite defeat at the Battle of Culloden on 16 April 1746, Mars and Bellone anchored at Loch nan Uamh on 30 April 1746. Mars carried the Loch Arkaig treasure and as the Royal Navy was approaching she took on board some escaping Jacobites, including James Drummond, 3rd Duke of Perth and Sir Thomas Sheridan.

Captain Rouillee, of Mars, decided to stay at anchor, upon the approach of the Royal Navy vessels HMS Greyhound, HMS Baltimore and HMS Terror, but Captain Lorry of Bellone set sail. Greyhound came alongside Mars and fired a broadside at close quarters which caused great loss of life: Mars was able to set sail during the engagement between Greyhound and Bellone. Terror tried to stop Mars but a volley from Bellone disabled her. Bellone then led Mars out to a bay at the head of Loch nan Uamh, where Mars started her repairs, and Bellone engaged the British ships. Spectators lined the shores watching the battle; Greyhound fired on the spectators to prevent the carrying away of the gold and cargo that had been unloaded by the French ships. Baltimore, along with Greyhound and Terror, tried to board the French ships, which however repelled the attack. Baltimore's captain sustained a head wound, her rigging was shattered, and she lost her anchor and two of her masts. Baltimore headed for The Minch for help. Mars had suffered damage, having been hit six times above the water line and seven times below the water line, and had three feet of water in her hold. Mars suffered 29 men killed and 85 men wounded.

HMS Dreadnought captured Mars off Cape Clear, Ireland on 4 April 1747.
