= Methionine–tRNA ligase, cytoplasmic =

Enzyme found in humans

MARS1
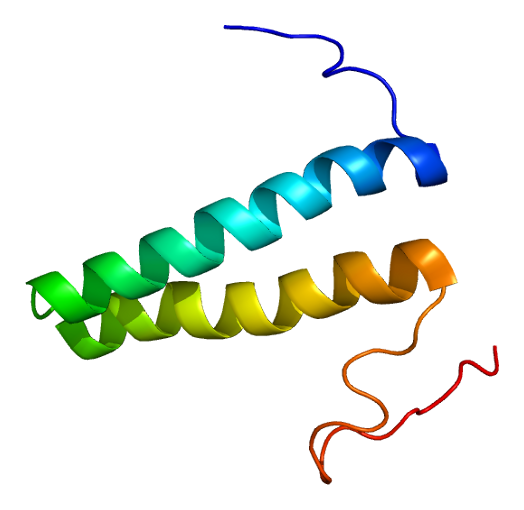

Identifiers
- Aliases: MARS1, METRS, MRS, MTRNS, SPG70, CMT2U, ILFS2, ILLD, methionyl-tRNA synthetase, methionyl-tRNA synthetase 1, MARS, TTD9
- External IDs: OMIM: 156560; MGI: 1345633; GeneCards: MARS1
Available structures
PDB	Ortholog search: PDBe RCSB
PDB	List of PDB id codes 2DJV, 4BL7, 4BVX, 4BVY
Enzyme activity
EC #	BRENDA	ExPASy	KEGG	MetaCyc
6.1.1.10	↗	↗	↗	↗

Gene location (Human)
Chr.	Chromosome 12 (human)
Band	12q13.3	Start	57,475,445 bp
Band	12q13.3	End	57,517,569 bp

Gene location (Mouse)
Chr.	Chromosome 10 (mouse)
Band	10|10 D3	Start	127,132,090 bp
Band	10|10 D3	End	127,147,655 bp
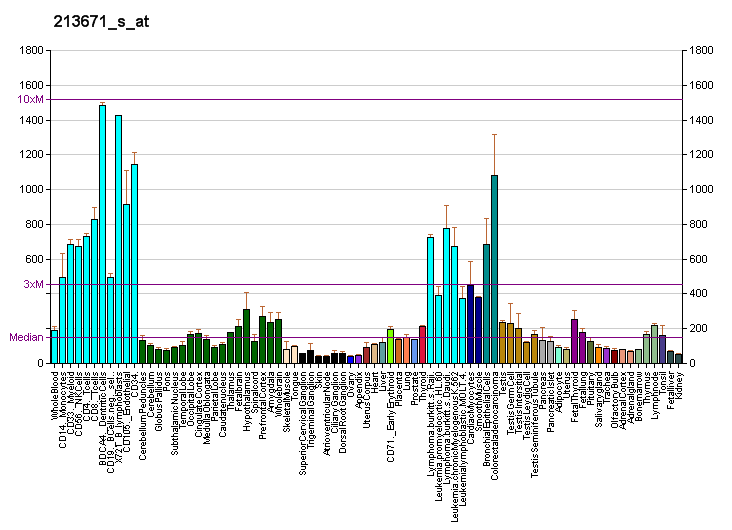

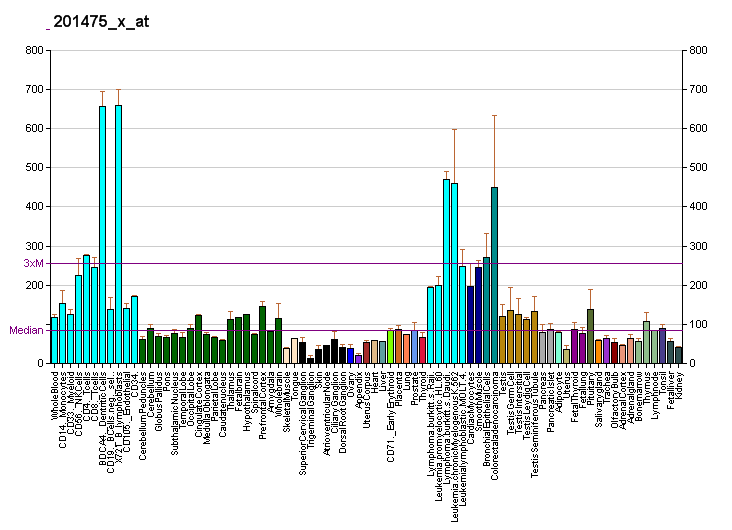
RNA expression pattern
Bgee	Human / Mouse (ortholog); Top expressed in: right hemisphere of cerebellum; anterior pituitary; right frontal lobe; tendon of biceps brachii; granulocyte; epithelium of colon; left lobe of thyroid gland; right lobe of thyroid gland; upper lobe of left lung; body of pancreas / Top expressed in: lacrimal gland; fossa; primitive streak; epiblast; tail of embryo; condyle; seminal vesicula; calvaria; muscle of thigh; abdominal wall; More reference expression data
BioGPS	More reference expression data
Gene ontology
Molecular function	aminoacyl-tRNA ligase activity; tRNA binding; nucleotide binding; ligase activity; ATP binding; RNA binding; methionine-tRNA ligase activity
Cellular component	extracellular exosome; membrane; nucleolus; cytoplasm; aminoacyl-tRNA synthetase multienzyme complex; cytosol; nucleus
Biological process	protein biosynthesis; tRNA aminoacylation for protein translation; cellular response to starvation; rRNA transcription; cellular response to insulin stimulus; cellular response to platelet-derived growth factor stimulus; cellular response to epidermal growth factor stimulus; positive regulation of transcription of nucleolar large rRNA by RNA polymerase I; methionyl-tRNA aminoacylation
Sources:Amigo / QuickGO
Orthologs
Databases	NCBI: entry; OMA: entry
Species	Human	Mouse
Entrez	4141	216443
Ensembl	ENSG00000166986	ENSMUSG00000040354
UniProt	P56192	Q68FL6
RefSeq (mRNA)	NM_004990	NM_001003913; NM_001171582
RefSeq (protein)	NP_004981	NP_001003913; NP_001165053
Location (UCSC)	Chr 12: 57.48 – 57.52 Mb	Chr 10: 127.13 – 127.15 Mb
PubMed search
- Wikidata
View/Edit Human	View/Edit Mouse

Methionine–tRNA ligase, cytoplasmic, also called methionyl-tRNA synthetase 1, is an enzyme that in humans is encoded by the MARS1 gene (formally MARS). Like to the related enzyme, MARS2, this enzyme function as a Methionine–tRNA ligase. This means it attaches the amino acid methionine to the corresponding transfer RNA (tRNA^{Met}) which is a preparation step for RNA-to-protein translation.

Aminoacyl-tRNA synthetases are a class of enzymes that charge tRNAs with their cognate amino acids. The protein encoded by this gene belongs to the class I family of tRNA synthetases.

== Medical significance ==
Pathogenic mutations in MARS1 have been associated with associated with a variety of illnesses. Heterozygous (loss-of-function) mutations have been associated with a form of Charcot-Marie-Tooth disease type 2U (CMT2U), while homozygous or compound heterozygous mutations have been associated with either Interstitial lung and liver disease (ILLD) or autosomal recessive spastic paraplegia-70 (SPG70).
