= Phoenix American =

Privately held financial services and technology company

- Type: Private
- Industry: Financial services
- Genre: Fund Administration
- Founded: 1972; 54 years ago California
- Founder: Gus Constantin
- Headquarters: Larkspur, California, United States
- Products: STAR-XMS fund administration system, MARS CRM
- Services: Transfer agent Services, Fund accounting, Securitization Managing Agent Services, Sales & Asset Reporting, 22c-2 Compliance, Data cleansing Services, Cable Television Services
- Subsidiaries: Phoenix American Financial Services, SalesFocus Solutions, Phoenix Leasing Portfolio Services, Inc., Phoenix Cable, Inc.
- Website: www.phxa.com

Phoenix American is an American financial services and technology company headquartered in Larkspur, California. It is the parent of four subsidiaries, Phoenix American Financial Services, PAFS Ireland, Ltd, Phoenix American SalesFocus Solutions and Phoenix Cable, Inc. These provide services including fund administration services for private equity and venture capital funds, transfer agent services, investor relations services, and managing agent services for asset-backed securitization in the commercial aircraft industry.

Gus Constantin was the founder of the company and is the president, chairman and chief executive officer of the company and all its subsidiaries.

== History ==
=== Origins ===
Phoenix American was founded in 1972 by Gus Constantin as the sponsor of a series of limited partnership investment funds for the leasing of business equipment (Phoenix Leasing). Four subsidiaries developed from the business sectors of Phoenix Leasing: Phoenix American Financial Services (fund administration, investor services and asset-backed securitization (ABS) managing agent services), SalesFocus Solutions (CRM, sales reporting and 22c-2 compliance services), Phoenix Leasing Portfolio Services (commercial lease portfolio management), and Phoenix Cable (cable television services). The company was publicly traded from 1982 until 1990. Gus Constantin is the president, chairman of the board and chief executive officer of the company and all its subsidiaries.

=== By 2023 ===
As of 2023, Phoenix American Financial Services (PAFS) was a Securities and Exchange Commission (SEC) registered transfer agent and provider of fund administration for alternative investment companies. The Phoenix American aviation ABS group provides managing agent and fund accounting services to asset-backed securitizations in the aviation leasing industry.

PAFS Ireland, Ltd., a wholly owned subsidiary of Phoenix American Financial Services, is the Ireland-based office of the Phoenix American aviation ABS group. Phoenix American SalesFocus Solutions (SFS) provides customer relationship management (CRM), sales reporting, data analytics and 22c-2 compliance to mutual fund companies and other asset management firms. Phoenix Leasing Portfolio Services, Inc. provides commercial lease portfolio management services for banks and other financial institutions. Phoenix Cable provides cable television services to the United States Navy.

=== By 2024 ===
In August, 2024, the fund administration and transfer agent assets of Phoenix American Financial Services (PAFS) were acquired by Vistra.

== Products and services ==
Phoenix American is the parent of three subsidiaries. Phoenix American Financial Services is a provider of fund administration services for private equity and venture capital funds. The company’s services include transfer agent services, investor relations, fund accounting, financial reporting and the preparation of investor tax documents. The company is the developer of the STAR-XMS transfer agent system.

The company’s Aviation ABS group, including its subsidiary PAFS Ireland, Ltd., provides managing agent services for asset-backed securitization (ABS) investment vehicles in the commercial aircraft industry. Phoenix American SalesFocus Solutions (SFS) is a provider of sales and asset reporting and data stewardship services for mutual funds and other asset management companies. The company is the developer of the MARS sales reporting platform. Phoenix Cable supplies cable television services to the United States Naval Station at Guantanamo Bay, Cuba.
