= Mars Hill Crossroads, Forsyth County, Georgia =

Unincorporated community in Georgia, U.S.

Coordinates: 34°09′23″N 84°11′45″W

Mars Hill Crossroads is an unincorporated community in Forsyth County, in the U.S. state of Georgia.

== History ==
Mars Hill Crossroads was named after a local church, which in turn was named after Mars Hill (Areopagus) in Classical Athens.
