= HMS Mars =

Seven ships of the Royal Navy have been named HMS Mars, after Mars, the Roman god of war:

- The first Mars was a 50-gun ship, originally Dutch, captured in the Second Anglo-Dutch War in 1665, and sold in 1667.
- The second Mars was a 64-gun third-rate ship of the line, originally French, captured by HMS Nottingham off Cape Clear in 1746. She was wrecked in 1755 near Halifax, Nova Scotia.
- The third HMS Mars (1759) was a 74-gun third rate, launched in 1759 and sold in 1784.
- The fourth Mars was a 32-gun fifth rate, originally Dutch, captured in the Fourth Anglo-Dutch War in 1781 in the West Indies, and sold in 1783. She became an East Indiaman but was wrecked in 1787 at the end of her first voyage for the British East India Company.
- The fifth HMS Mars (1794), was a 74-gun third rate, launched in 1794. She took part in the Spithead mutiny in 1797 and the Battle of Trafalgar in 1805. She was broken up in 1823.
- The sixth HMS Mars (1848), was an 80-gun second rate, launched in 1848, converted to screw propulsion, and sold in 1929. Between 1869 and 1929 she served as a training ship.
- The seventh HMS Mars (1896) was a Majestic-class battleship, launched in 1896. She served as a guardship and transport in World War I and was sold in 1921.
- Mars was to have been a Minotaur-class cruiser, but was cancelled in 1946.
- A Colossus-class aircraft carrier was named Mars in 1942, but renamed before being launched as HMS Pioneer in 1944.

== See also ==
- Mars-class ship of the line
- RFA Wave Duke (A246), previously called SS Empire Mars
- MARS tanker (Military Afloat Reach and Sustainability) project for the Royal Navy
- Mars (disambiguation)
