= The Organ (Arches National Park) =

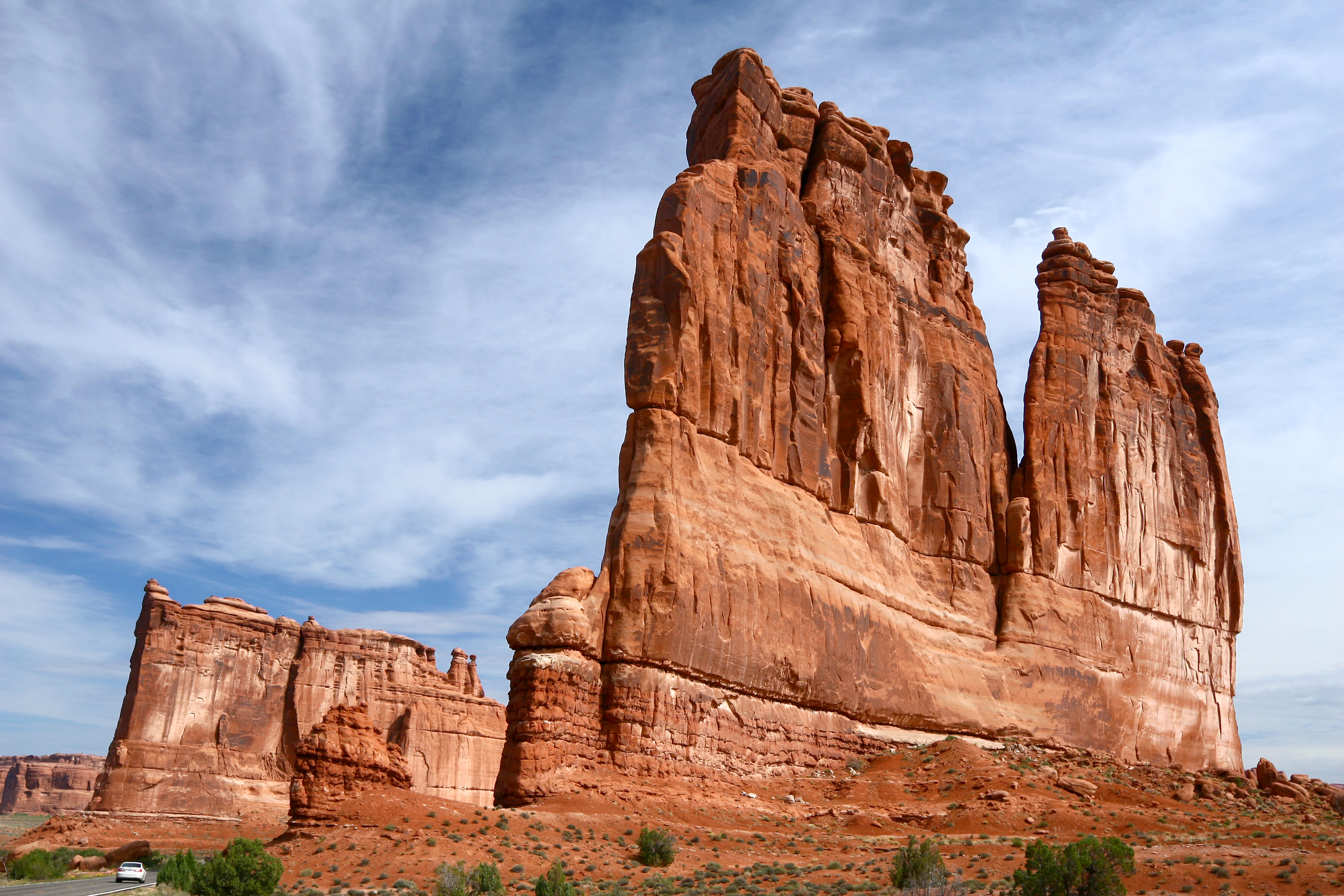
- South aspect

Highest point
- Elevation: 4,735 ft (1,443 m)
- Prominence: 435 ft (133 m)
- Isolation: 0.72 mi (1.16 km)
- Coordinates: 38°38′11″N 109°35′52″W

Geography
- Location within Utah Location within the United States
- Country: United States
- State: Utah
- County: Grand
- Protected area: Arches National Park
- Parent range: Colorado Plateau
- Topo map: USGS The Windows Section

Geology
- Rock age: Jurassic
- Rock type: Entrada Sandstone

Climbing
- First ascent: 1986
- Easiest route: class 5.10 climbing

The Organ is a 4,735-foot-elevation (1,443-meter) pillar in Grand County, Utah, United States

== Description ==
The Organ is located within Arches National Park and like many of the rock formations in the park, it is composed of Entrada Sandstone, specifically the Slick Rock Member overlaying the Dewey Bridge Member. The double summit butte is 500 feet tall, and topographic relief is significant as the summit rises 500 feet (152 meters) vertically above the main park road in 0.1 mile (0.16 km). Precipitation runoff from The Organ drains to the nearby Colorado River via Courthouse Wash. This landform's descriptive toponym has been officially adopted by the United States Board on Geographic Names. This landform was shown briefly in the opening scene credits of the 1989 American action-adventure film Indiana Jones and the Last Crusade.

== Climbing ==
The first ascent of the true summit was made in March 1986 by Pete Gallagher and Steve Sommers via the class 5.11 Death By Hands route. In April 1986, Duane Raleigh climbed it solo via the class 5.10 Dune route, but he became disconnected from the rope while descending the second rappel and free-fell 160 feet until miraculously arrested by his haul line which jammed in a crack during the fall. The lower northeast summit was first climbed on October 29, 1986, by Pete Gallagher and John Gatto via the class 5.10 Gates of Hell route.

== Climate ==
According to the Köppen climate classification system, The Organ is located in a cold semi-arid climate zone with cold winters and hot summers. Spring and fall are the most favorable seasons to experience Arches National Park, when highs average 60 to 80 °F (15 to 25 °C) and lows average 30 to 50 °F (0 to 10 °C). Summer temperatures often exceed 100 °F (40 °C). Winters are cold, with highs averaging 30 to 50 °F (0 to 10 °C), and lows averaging 0 to 20 °F (−20 to −5 °C). As part of a high desert region, it can experience wide daily temperature fluctuations. The park receives an average of less than 10 inches (25 cm) of rain annually.

== Gallery ==
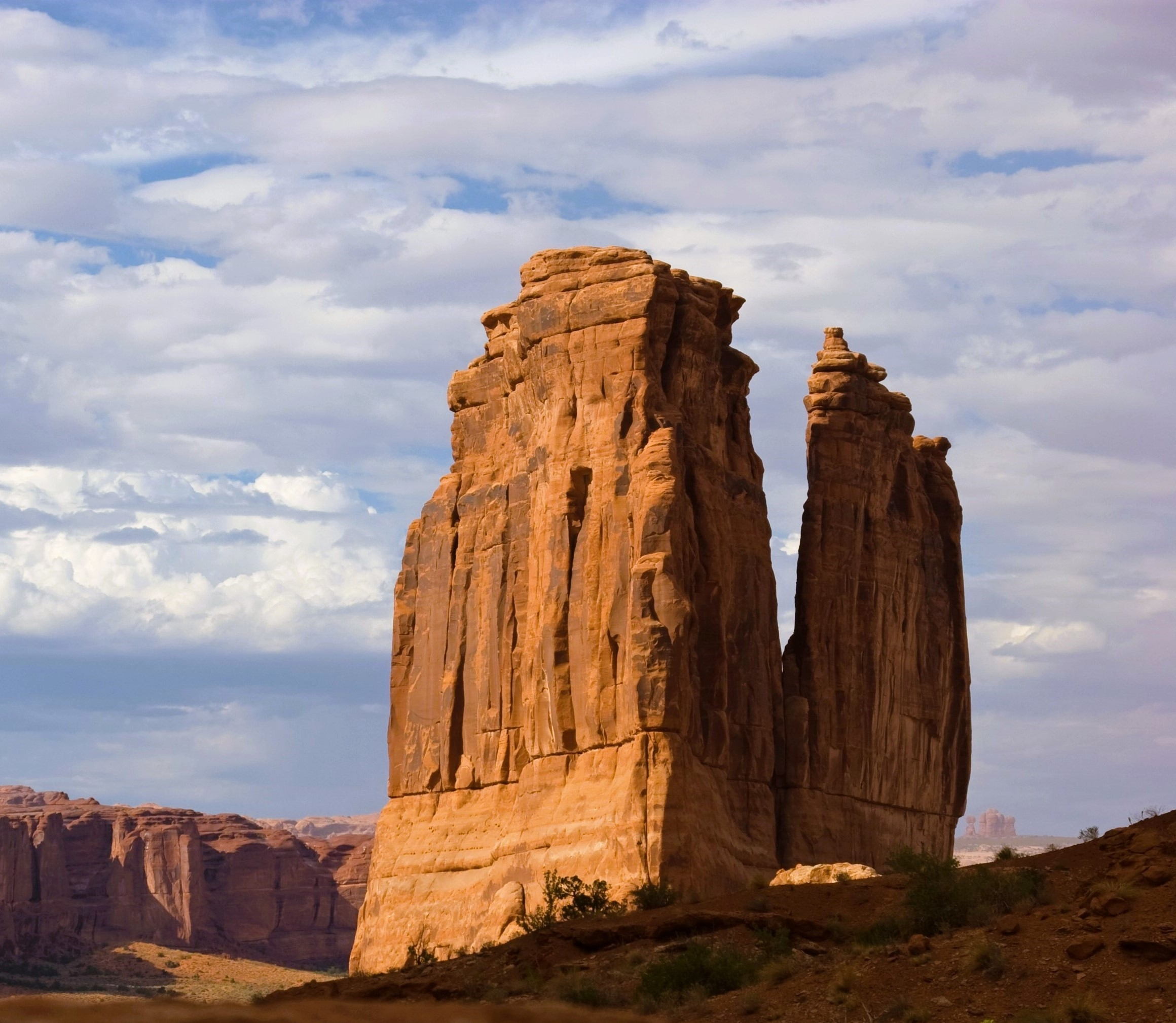
South aspect

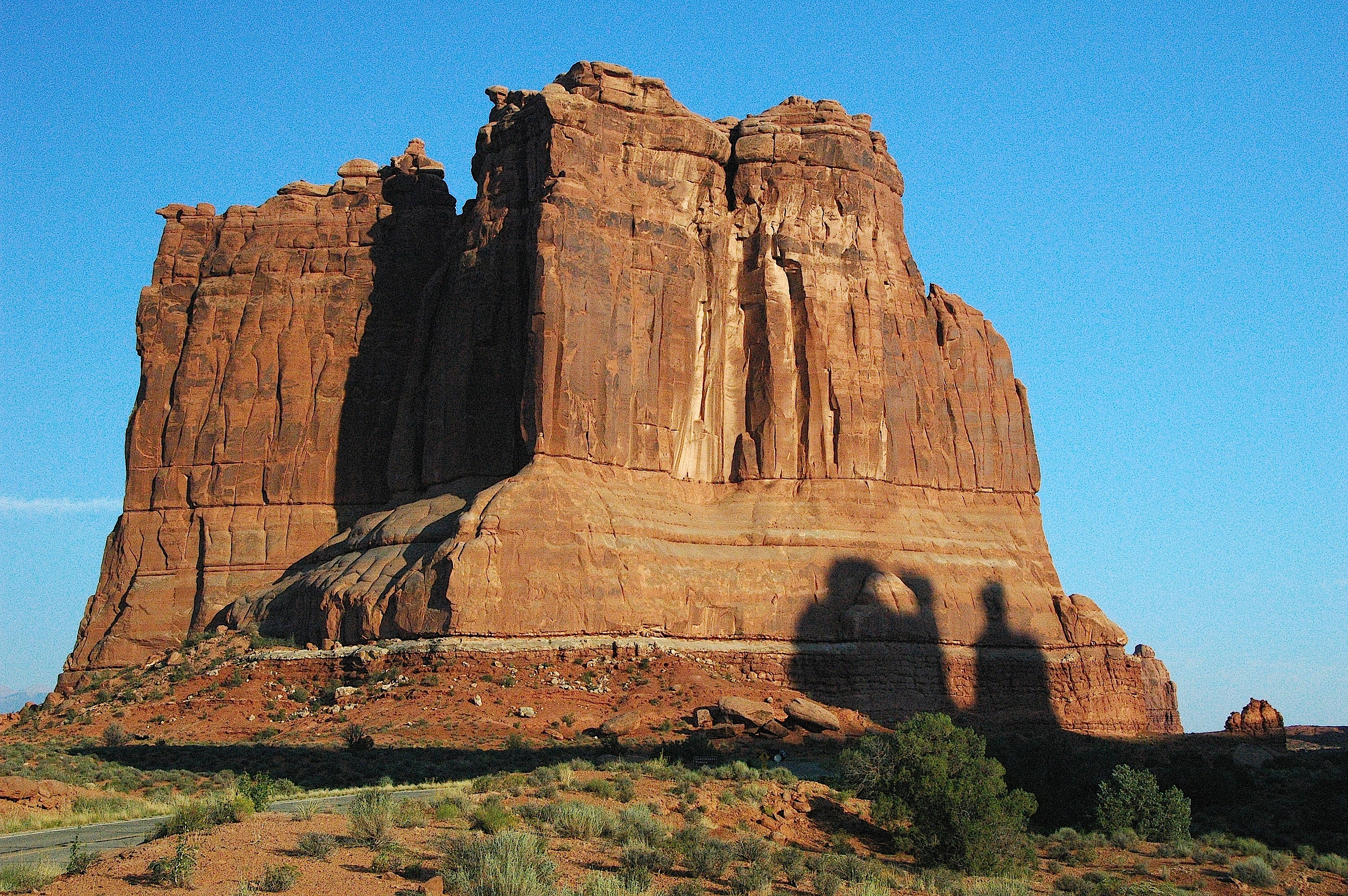
Northwest aspect of The Organ (with shadow of Three Gossips)

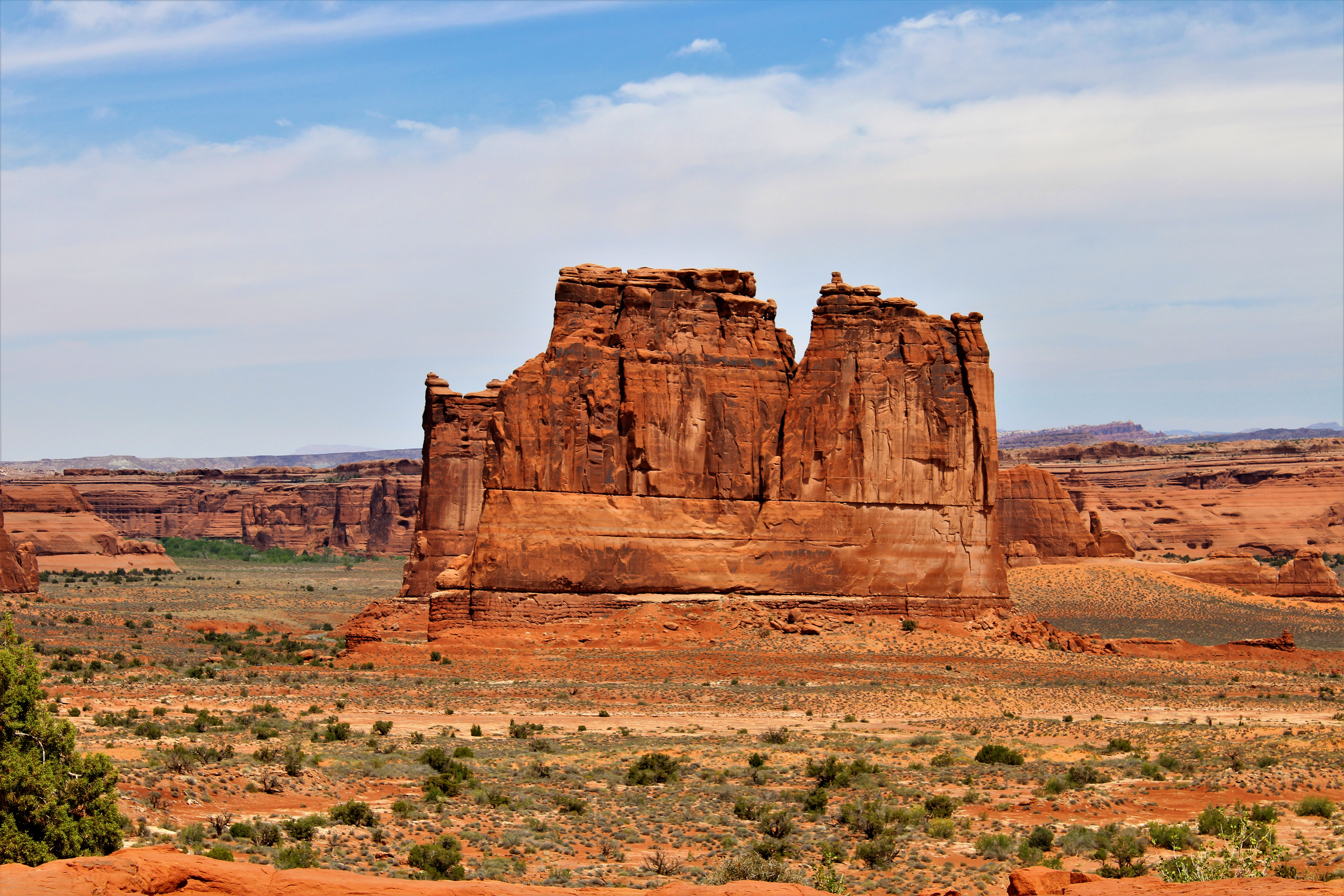
Southeast aspect

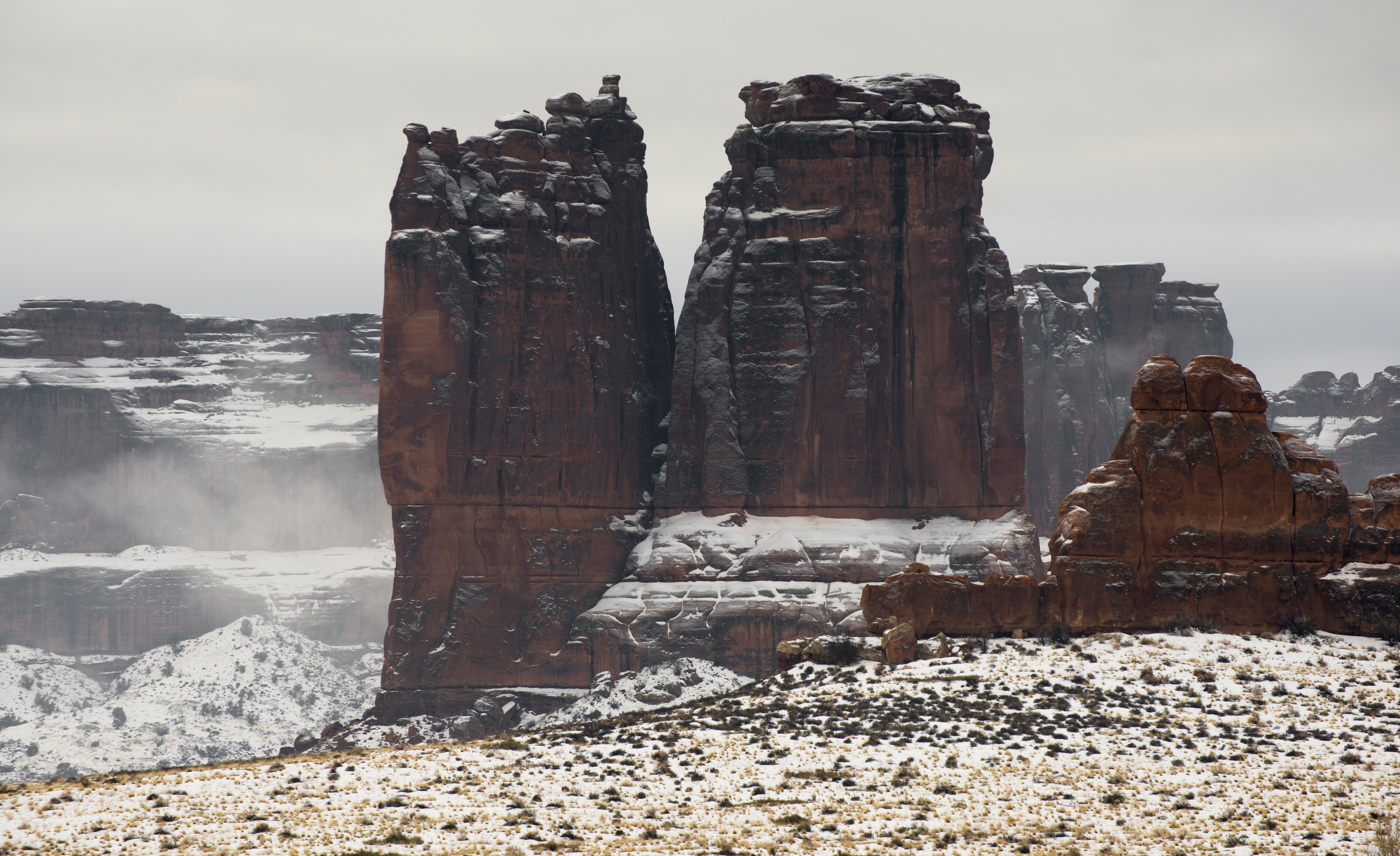
North aspect in winter

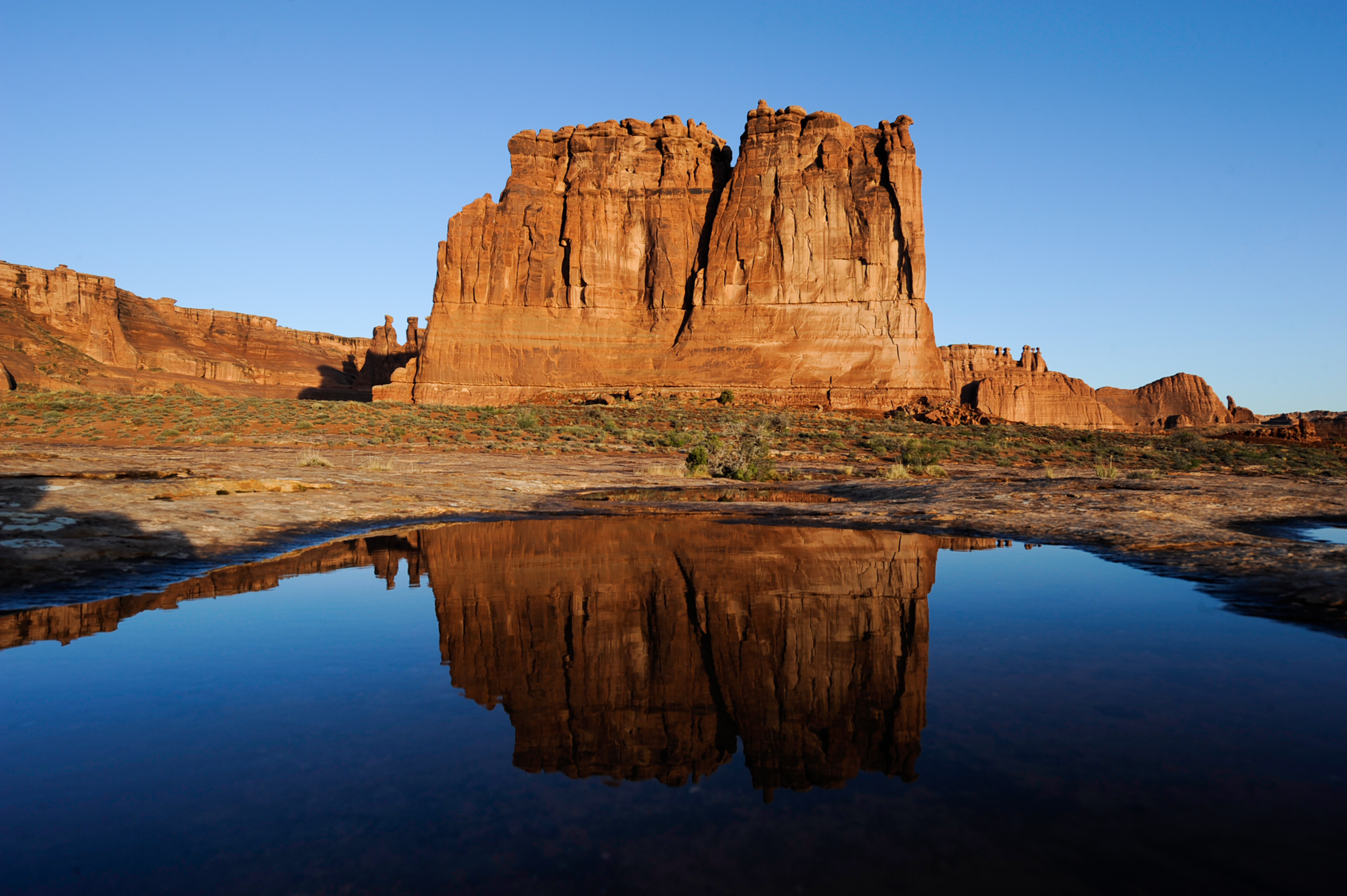
East aspect

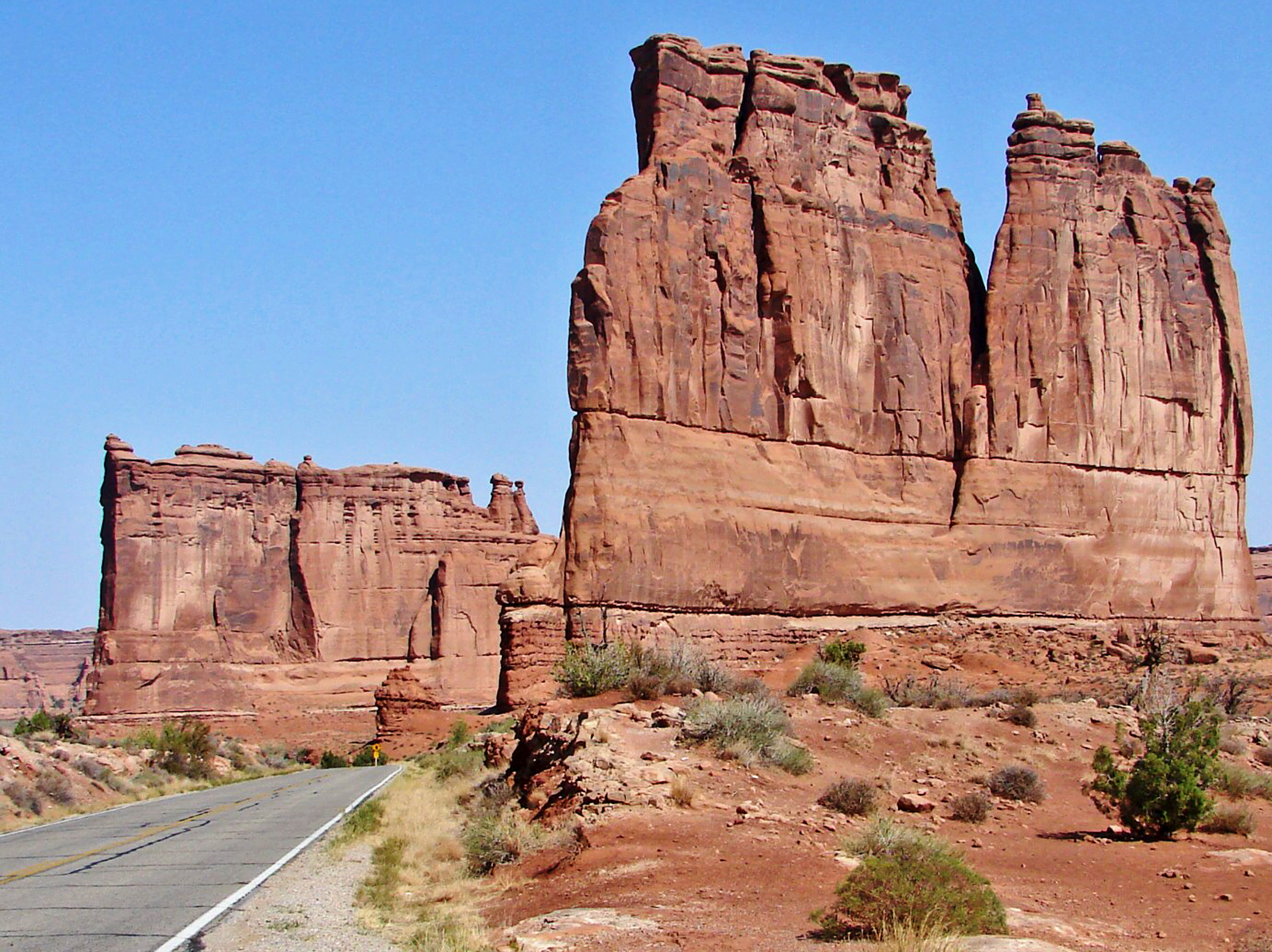
The Organ, with Tower of Babel to left

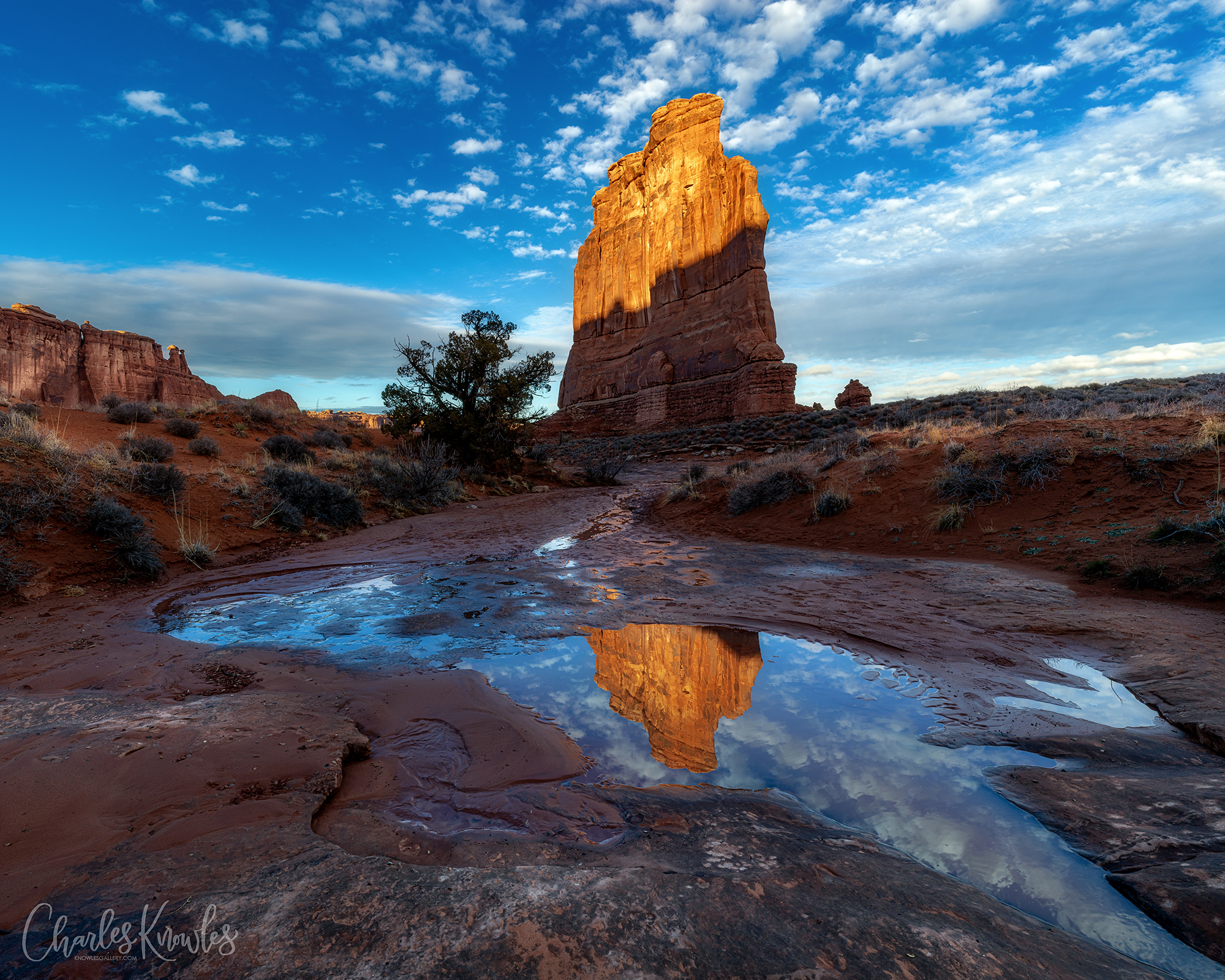
Southwest aspect

== See also ==
- Geology of Utah
- Fin (geology)
