= SMS Mars =

SMS Mars may refer to one of two ships in the German and Austro-Hungarian Navies:

- SMS Mars (1879), a German gunnery training ship in the 19th century
- SMS Tegetthoff (1878), an Austro-Hungarian central battery ship, renamed Mars in 1912
