= Mars 2MV-4 =

Mars 2MV-4 can refer to two Soviet spacecraft:

- Mars 2MV-4 No.1
- Mars 1

== See also ==
- Mars 2M (disambiguation)
