= RFA Wave Duke =

1946 Wave-class oiler of the Royal Fleet Auxiliary

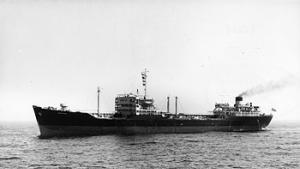

History

United Kingdom
- Name: SS Empire Mars (1944-46); RFA Wave Duke (1946-69)
- Builder: Sir J. Laing & Sons Ltd, Sunderland
- Launched: 16 November 1944
- Commissioned: 16 November 1946
- Decommissioned: 30 April 1960
- Fate: Scrapped in 1970

General characteristics
- Tonnage: 8,187 gross register tons (GRT)
- Displacement: 16,483 tons full load
- Length: 492 ft 8 in (150.16 m)
- Beam: 64 ft 4 in (19.61 m)
- Draught: 28 ft 6 in (8.69 m)
- Propulsion: 2 x Metrovick double reduction geared steam turbines, 6,800 hp (5,100 kW).
- Speed: 14.5 knots (26.9 km/h)

RFA Wave Duke (A246) was a Wave-class fleet support tanker of the Royal Fleet Auxiliary built at Sir J. Laing & Sons Ltd at Sunderland. She saw service during the Korean War. She was laid up at Devonport on 30 April 1960, and arrived at Bilbao to be scrapped on 25 December 1969.
