= Anna Marrs =

American corporate executive

- Education: Northwestern University; London Business School
- Title: President of Global Commercial Services, American Express

Anna Marrs (born 1974) is President of Global Commercial Services at American Express, responsible for the company's businesses devoted to serving small, mid-sized, large and global companies around the world.

== Early life ==
Marrs has a bachelor's degree from Chicago's Northwestern University, and an MBA from London Business School.

== Career ==
Marrs' first job was with D. E. Shaw, a New York-based investment firm. She went on to become a partner in the banking practice of McKinsey & Company, and the CEO of a London-based financial information company.

In 2012, Marrs joined Standard Chartered as group head of strategy and corporate development. She was also Standard Chartered's CEO of Commercial and Private Banking and Regional CEO for ASEAN and South Asia until mid 2018. Marrs joined American Express as President of Global Commercial Services in September 2018.
