= HMS Dreadnought (1742) =

Ship of the line of the Royal Navy

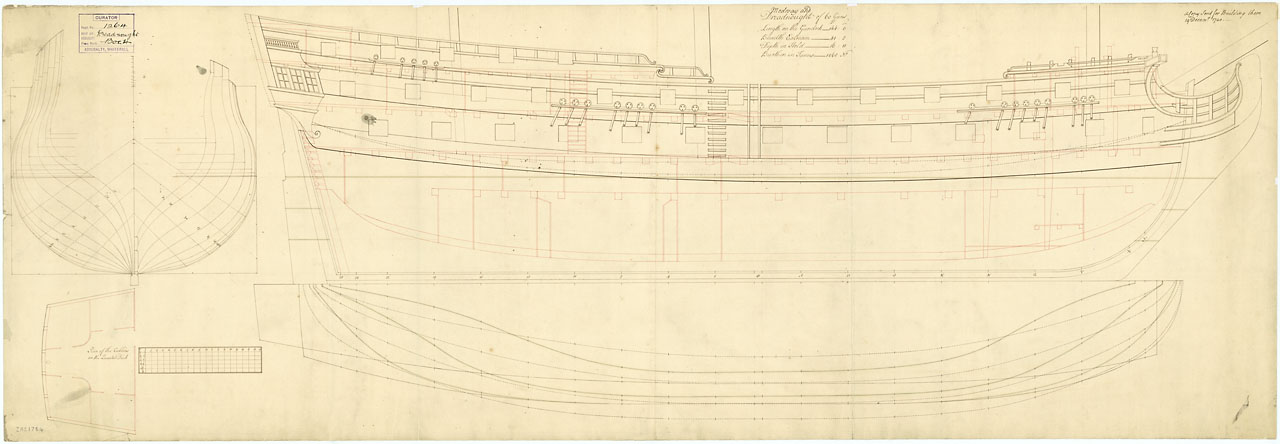
- Dreadnought

History

Great Britain
- Name: HMS Dreadnought
- Ordered: 5 December 1740
- Builder: Wells, Deptford
- Launched: 23 June 1742
- Fate: Sold 1784

History

Great Britain
- Name: Dreadnought
- Namesake: Previous name retained
- Fate: Foundered 1803

General characteristics
- Class & type: 1733 proposals 60-gun fourth rate ship of the line
- Tons burthen: 1093 (bm)
- Length: 144 ft (43.9 m) (gundeck)
- Beam: 41 ft 5 in (12.6 m)
- Depth of hold: 16 ft 11 in (5.2 m)
- Propulsion: Sails
- Sail plan: Full-rigged ship
- Armament: 60 guns: Gundeck: 24 × 24-pounder guns; Upper gundeck: 26 × 9-pounder guns; QD: 8 × 6-pounder guns; Fc: 2 × 6-pounder guns

HMS Dreadnought was a 60-gun fourth rate ship of the line of the Royal Navy, built according to the 1733 proposals of the 1719 Establishment at Deptford, and was launched on 23 June 1742. Dreadnought served until 1784, when she was sold out of the service.

Retaining her name, Dreadnought operated as a merchant ship after her naval service until she foundered in the English Channel, 3 leagues — 9 nautical miles (17 km; 10 mi) — south of North Foreland, Kent, England, in 1803.
