= Dutch frigate Mars =

History

Dutch Republic
- Name: Mars
- Builder: John May, Amsterdam Naval District Dockyard
- Launched: 1769
- Captured: 1781

Great Britain
- Name: Mars
- Acquired: 1781 by capture
- Fate: Sold 1784

Great Britain
- Name: Mars
- Owner: Richard Bush
- Builder: Adams (repair)
- Acquired: By purchase 1784
- Fate: Wrecked December 1787

General characteristics
- Type: Fifth rate
- Tons burthen: 696 or 70286/94 or 69687/94 (bm)
- Length: 139'8/11" (lower deck) (Note: Amsterdam feet (voet) of 11 Amsterdam inches (duim) (see Dutch units of measurement). The Amsterdam foot is about 8% shorter than an English foot. The Dutch data is from Van Maanen.); 130 ft 9 in (39.9 m) (overall)132 ft 8 in (40.4 m) (overall); 108 ft 10 in (33.2 m) (keel) 106 ft 11 1/2 in (32.6 m) (keel)
- Beam: 37'8/11; 34 ft 10 in (10.6 m); 35 ft 0 in (10.7 m)
- Depth of hold: 11 ft 10 in (3.6 m); 11 ft 11 in (3.6 m)
- Propulsion: Sails
- Complement: British service:220
- Armament: Dutch service: 32-36 guns; Royal Navy service: 32 guns

John May built Mars at the naval dockyard at Amsterdam in 1769 as a fifth rate for the Dutch Navy. The British Royal Navy captured her on 3 February 1781 at Saint Eustatia. The Navy took her into service as HMS Mars, but sold her on 25 March 1784. Richard Bush purchased Mars, retained her name, and had her fitted as an East Indiaman. Adams repaired her and took her measurements in 1786. She sailed to China in April 1786 for the British East India Company (EIC) and was wrecked in December 1787 shortly after her return to Britain.

== Capture ==
Following the outbreak of the Fourth Anglo-Dutch War between Britain and the Dutch Republic Admiral George Rodney, acting under orders from London, captured the Dutch island of St Eustatius on 3 February 1781.

Mars under the command of Van Bijland was the only Dutch warship in the roadstead. Two British ships. Gibraltar and the Prince William shot at her without orders, for which their captains were reprimanded by Rodney. Mars was captured together with 5 other small ships of war and more 130 merchant vessels.

== British Royal Navy ==
The Royal Navy commissioned Mars under Captain John Whitmore Chetwynd. He sailed her back to England as part of a fleet of prizes and other ships. She arrived at Portsmouth on 28 June 1781, and was paid off at Chatham in August. The Navy completed her survey there on 12 February 1782. It sold her on 25 March 1784 for £505.

== East Indiaman ==
Richard Bush purchased her and had Mars refitted by Adams as an East Indiaman.

Under the command of Captain William Farington (or Farrington), she left The Downs on 26 April 1786, bound for China as an "extra" ship for the EIC. Mars arrived at Whampoa on 11 December. She crossed the Second Bar on 22 March 1787, and was at Mew Bay (some two miles east of Tanjung Layar), by 11 May. She arrived at Mauritius on 15 June, and left on 4 August. By 21 September she was at St Helena, which she left on 2 October. Mars arrived at The Downs on 8 December, but was lost on the Margate Sands the next day. The pilot made an error that resulted in her stranding. The cost to the EIC of the loss of her cargo was £70,000.
