= Methionine–tRNA ligase, mitochondrial =

Enzyme found in humans

MARS2

Identifiers
- Aliases: MARS2, MetRS, mtMetRS, COXPD25, methionyl-tRNA synthetase 2, mitochondrial
- External IDs: OMIM: 609728; MGI: 2444136; GeneCards: MARS2
Enzyme activity
EC #	BRENDA	ExPASy	KEGG	MetaCyc
6.1.1.10	↗	↗	↗	↗

Gene location (Human)
Chr.	Chromosome 2 (human)
Band	2q33.1	Start	197,705,369 bp
Band	2q33.1	End	197,708,395 bp

Gene location (Mouse)
Chr.	Chromosome 1 (mouse)
Band	1|1 C1.2	Start	55,276,336 bp
Band	1|1 C1.2	End	55,287,629 bp
RNA expression pattern
Bgee	Human / Mouse (ortholog); Top expressed in: gonad; tibialis anterior muscle; mucosa of ileum; testicle; pancreatic ductal cell; islet of Langerhans; mucosa of transverse colon; secondary oocyte; gastrocnemius muscle; right adrenal cortex / Top expressed in: spermatocyte; spermatid; ventricular zone; tail of embryo; dentate gyrus of hippocampal formation granule cell; embryo; muscle of thigh; neural layer of retina; lumbar spinal ganglion; yolk sac; More reference expression data
BioGPS	n/a
Gene ontology
Molecular function	aminoacyl-tRNA ligase activity; ligase activity; ATP binding; nucleotide binding; methionine-tRNA ligase activity
Cellular component	mitochondrial matrix; mitochondrion; cytoplasm
Biological process	tRNA aminoacylation for protein translation; methionyl-tRNA aminoacylation; protein biosynthesis
Sources:Amigo / QuickGO
Orthologs
Databases	NCBI: entry; OMA: entry
Species	Human	Mouse
Entrez	92935	212679
Ensembl	ENSG00000247626	ENSMUSG00000046994
UniProt	Q96GW9	Q499X9
RefSeq (mRNA)	NM_138395	NM_175439
RefSeq (protein)	NP_612404	NP_780648
Location (UCSC)	Chr 2: 197.71 – 197.71 Mb	Chr 1: 55.28 – 55.29 Mb
PubMed search
- Wikidata
View/Edit Human	View/Edit Mouse

Methionine–tRNA ligase, mitochondrial, also called methionyl-tRNA synthetase 2, is an enzyme that in humans is encoded by the MARS2 gene. This enzyme functions as a methionine–tRNA ligase, which means it binds the amino acid methionine to its corresponding transfer RNA (tRNA^{Met}), which is part of RNA-to-protein translation.

== Medical Significance ==
Pathogenic mutations in MARS2 are associated with problems with muscle coordination, and in particular a type of ataxia called autosomal recessive spastic ataxia-3 (SPAX3).

== See also ==
- Aminoacyl tRNA synthetase
