= HMS Greyhound (1741) =

History

Great Britain
- Name: HMS Greyhound
- Ordered: 5 December 1740
- Builder: Thomas Snelgrove, Limehouse
- Laid down: 26 January 1741
- Launched: 19 September 1741
- Completed: 10 November 1741
- Commissioned: September 1741
- Decommissioned: January 1768
- Out of service: 5 April 1768
- Fate: Sold out of service, April 1768

General characteristics
- Class & type: 24-gun sixth-rate
- Tons burthen: 450 55/94 bm
- Length: 108 ft 1 in (32.9 m) (overall); 88 ft 3 in (26.9 m) (keel)
- Beam: 31 ft 0 in (9.4 m)
- Depth of hold: 10 ft 2 in (3.1 m)
- Propulsion: Sail
- Sail plan: ship-rigged
- Complement: 140 (160 from 1745)
- Armament: 20 × 9pdrs (upper deck); 2 × 9pdrs (lower deck); 2 × 3 pdrs (quarterdeck)

HMS Greyhound was a 20-gun sixth-rate ship of the Royal Navy, built in 1740–41 according to the 1733 modifications of the 1719 Establishment, and served in the West Indies, the Americas and the Caribbean. After extensive service including the single-handed capture of two other ships of equivalent size and armament, Greyhound was driven ashore in the River Thames at Erith, Kent in January 1768. She was declared unseaworthy and sold out of service three months later.

== Bibliography ==
- Winfield, Rif (2007). British Warships of the Age of Sail 1714–1792: Design, Construction, Careers and Fates. Seaforth. ISBN 9781844157006.
