= USS Mars (AC-6) =

Collier of the United States Navy

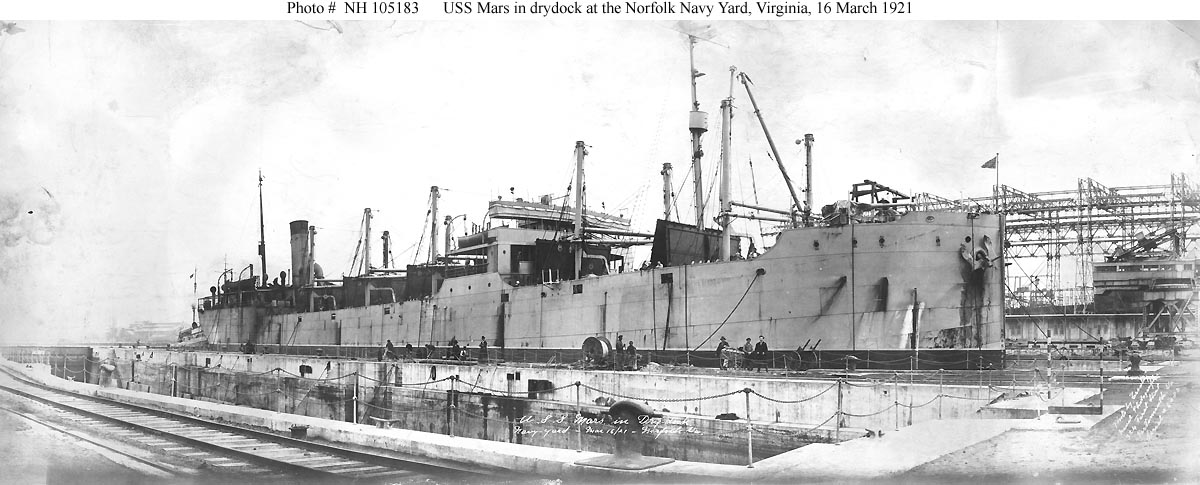
- Mars

History

United States
- Name: USS Mars
- Builder: Bethlehem Sparrows Point Shipyard, Maryland
- Laid down: 5 October 1908
- Launched: 10 April 1909
- Sponsored by: Ms. Juliana Keyser
- Commissioned: 26 August 1909
- Decommissioned: 3 July 1912
- Recommissioned: 11 December 1912
- Decommissioned: 15 July 1913
- Recommissioned: 8 May 1914
- Decommissioned: 27 December 1921
- Reclassified: "AC-6", 17 July 1920
- Stricken: 26 April 1923
- Fate: Sold, 22 June 1923; Ran aground and abandoned, 8 November 1924

General characteristics
- Type: Collier
- Displacement: 11,250 long tons (11,430 t) normal
- Length: 403 ft (123 m)
- Beam: 53 ft (16 m)
- Draft: 24 ft 8 in (7.52 m)
- Speed: 12.65 kn (14.56 mph; 23.43 km/h)
- Complement: 82
- Armament: 4 × 0.5 in (12.7 mm) machine guns

The second USS Mars (AC-6) was a collier of the United States Navy. The ship was laid down by the Maryland Steel Co., Sparrows Point, Maryland on 5 October 1908, launched on 10 April 1909, sponsored by Miss Juliana Keyser, and commissioned at Norfolk on 26 August 1909. She was the sister of the USS Hector (AC-7).

== Service history ==
=== 1910–1913 ===
Assigned to the Atlantic Fleet, Mars departed Norfolk on 6 January 1910 for Guantánamo Bay, Cuba, for fueling operations in the Caribbean. Returning Norfolk on 14 March, the collier sailed on 1 April for the South Atlantic Squadron. Arriving at Maldonado Bay, Uruguay, on the 25th, she remained there, coaling ships, until heading home on 14 May, and arriving Norfolk on 4 June.

After operations out of Norfolk, the collier sailed on 14 December with stores for the European station. On 7 January 1911, Mars cleared Cherbourg, France, to return to Norfolk on the 26th. She served out of Norfolk for the next 18 months, making five voyages to Guantanamo, before decommissioning on 3 July 1912 to go into drydock at Portsmouth Navy Yard, Portsmouth, New Hampshire. Mars recommissioned on 11 December and resumed her east coast operations off Portsmouth until again decommissioned on 15 July 1913.

=== 1914–1921 ===
On 8 May 1914, Mars recommissioned and departed six days later for Vera Cruz to support fleet action off Mexico following the arrest of a U.S. Navy shore party in April. Returning to Newport News, Virginia on 12 September, she sailed for the Marianas, arriving Apra Harbor, Guam on 20 January 1915. On 7 March, Mars steamed for home, arriving Norfolk on 22 May. She departed with supplies on 24 July for the first of three voyages from the east coast to Balboa, Canal Zone, ending at Baltimore, Maryland on 9 April 1916.

Mars sailed for the west coast on 26 April, arriving San Diego on 7 June. She operated along the coasts of western Mexico and Central America until 6 July 1917, when she headed for the east coast, reaching Norfolk on the 31st.

For the next 21 months, the ship served off the Atlantic coast transporting coal, cargo, and passengers. Assigned to the newly established Naval Overseas Transportation Service (NOTS) on 9 January 1918, Mars made four cruises to the Mediterranean between 1 April 1919 and 25 November 1921, when she retired to Hampton Roads, Virginia. The collier was reclassified "AC-6" on 17 July 1920.

=== Decommissioning and sale ===
Mars decommissioned on 27 December 1921, was struck from the Naval Vessel Register on 26 April 1923, and sold to Mr. John E. Walsh, Boston, Massachusetts on 22 June. On 8 November 1924, she ran aground off Daiquiri, Cuba — with the loss of one life — and was abandoned.
