= USS Charleston (1798) =

History

United States
- Name: USS Charleston
- Namesake: Charleston, South Carolina
- Laid down: 1798
- Launched: 1798
- Completed: 1798
- Commissioned: 1798
- Fate: Sold about 1 February 1802

General characteristics
- Type: row galley
- Length: 52 ft (16 m)
- Beam: 15 ft (4.6 m)
- Depth: 5 ft 2 in (1.57 m)
- Complement: 28 officers and enlisted men
- Armament: 1 × 24-pounder gun; 5 × howitzers

The first USS Charleston was a row galley that served in the United States Navy from 1798 to 1802.

Charleston was built at Charleston, South Carolina, in 1798. Commanded by Captain-of-a-Galley James Payne, she was used to defend the coast of South Carolina during the Quasi-War with France. She was sold in Charleston around 1 February 1802.
