= Battle of Culloden order of battle =

Order of battle

The Battle of Culloden took place on 16 April 1746 at Culloden, Highland, near Inverness in the Scottish Highlands. A Jacobite army under Charles Edward Stuart was decisively defeated by a British government force under the Duke of Cumberland, ending the Jacobite rising of 1745.

== Jacobite Army ==
=== Composition ===
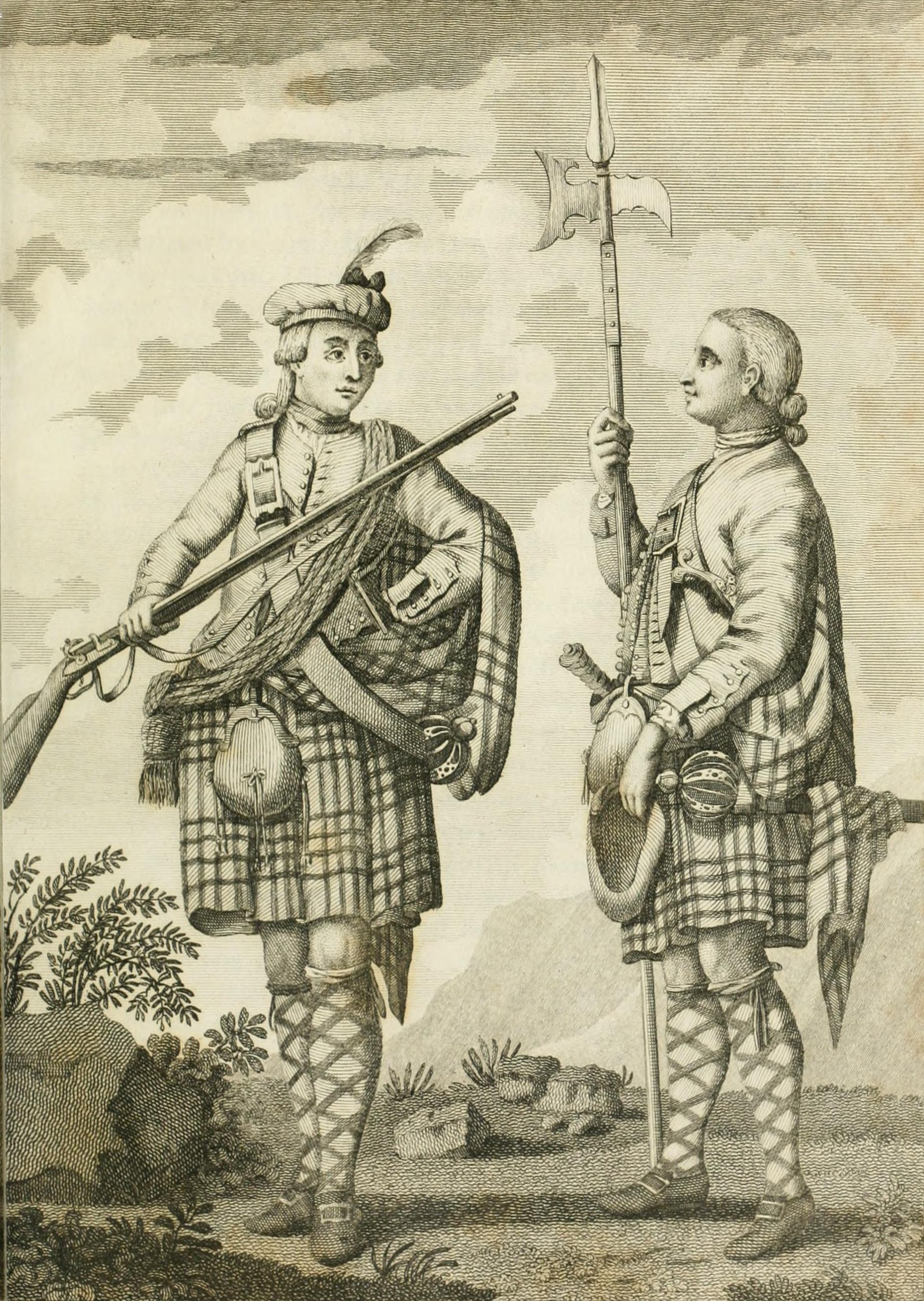
Soldier of a government Highland regiment, c. 1740. Their Jacobite counterparts would have worn something very similar.

The Jacobite Army is often assumed to have been largely composed of Gaelic-speaking Catholic Highlanders. In reality, nearly half of the rank and file were from the more urbanised areas of the Scottish Lowlands. While predominantly Scottish, it also contained some English recruits, the majority deserters from the government army. During the latter stages of the campaign, these were reinforced by detachments of Irish and Scots professionals in French service, mainly from the Royal Ecossais and Irish Brigade. Around 500 fought at Culloden, including 100 reputedly recruited from government troops captured at Fort Augustus in March.

The Jacobites initially relied heavily on the traditional right of Highland chiefs to recruit their tenants for military service. However, this obligation had largely fallen into disuse, and many had to be compelled to serve with threats of eviction. As a result, desertion was an ongoing issue, while the colonels of some Highland regiments considered their men to be uncontrollable. (Note: Jacobite chief of staff, John O'Sullivan wrote, "All was confused ... such a chiefe of a tribe had sixty men, another thiry, another twenty, more or lesse; they would not mix nor seperat, & wou'd have double officers, yt is two Captns & two Lts, to each Compagny, strong or weak ... but by little, were brought into a certain regulation".)

A typical Highland regiment was officered by tacksmen, with their subtenants providing the rank and file. Tacksmen served in the front rank, and thus incurred a disproportionate number of casualties, accounting for over 25% of those incurred by the Appin regiment. Although often pictured equipped with a broadsword, shield, and pistol, most of the Highland troops used muskets as their main weapon.

Many Jacobite regiments, notably those recruited from Lowland areas, were organised along conventional European lines, but as with the Highland levies, these were inexperienced and poorly equipped. As the campaign progressed, supplies from France improved their equipment considerably and by April 1746 many were equipped with 0.69 in (17.5 mm) calibre French and Spanish firelocks.

By the time of Culloden, most of the Jacobite cavalry had been disbanded due to a shortage of horses, with only minor elements taking part. Their heavy artillery was also largely absent, with all but one of the cannon present being light 3-pounders.

=== Jacobite Order of Battle ===
Commander-in-Chief Charles Edward Stuart
Chief of staff Colonel John William Sullivan

| Division | Unit | | Notes |
|---|---|---|---|
| Prince's Escort | Fitzjames' Horse: 16 men. Lifeguards: 16 men. | | |
| Lord George Murray's Division | Atholl Brigade: 500 men | | |
| Lord George Murray's Division | Cameron of Lochiel's Regiment: ~ 650–700 men | | Regarded as one of the strongest Jacobite units. |
| Lord George Murray's Division | Stewarts of Appin or Appin Regiment: 250 men | | |
| Lord John Drummond's Division | Lord Lovat's Regiment: ~ 300 men | | Though it comprised two battalions, only that commanded by Charles Fraser of Inverallochie was present; the other missed the battle by several hours. |
| Lord John Drummond's Division | Lady Mackintosh's Regiment: ~ 350 men | | Sometimes referred to as the Clan Chattan Regiment. A composite unit, like the Atholl Brigade, led by Alexander McGillivray of Dunmaglass, many of its officers became casualties at Culloden. |
| Lord John Drummond's Division | Monaltrie's Battalion of Clan Farquharson: 150 men. | | Primarily raised in Braemar and Strathdee, by Francis Farquharson of Monaltrie. Also included a detachment of MacGregors commanded by MacGregor of Inverenzie. |
| Lord John Drummond's Division | Maclachlans and Macleans: ~ 200 men | | Commanded by Lachlan Maclachlan of Castle Lachlan, with Maclean of Drimmin as his deputy. Originally part of the Athole Brigade, Culloden was the first time it operated as a stand-alone unit. |
| Lord John Drummond's Division | Chisholms of Strathglass: ~ 80 men | | Led by Roderick Og of Clan Chisholm, suffered very heavy casualties at Culloden. |
| Duke of Perth's Division | MacDonald of Keppoch's Regiment. 200 men. | | Commanded by Alexander MacDonald of Keppoch. Consisted of MacDonalds of Keppoch, MacDonalds of Glencoe, (Note: The latter was commanded by Alexander MacDonald of Glencoe. It surrendered on 12 May 1746, having allegedly lost 52 killed and 36 wounded.) Mackinnons, and MacGregors. |
| Duke of Perth's Division | MacDonald of Clanranald's Regiment: 200 men. | | Commanded by MacDonald of Clanranald, younger, who was wounded during the battle. Disbanded at Fort Augustus about 18 April 1746. |
| Duke of Perth's Division | MacDonell of Glengarry's Regiment: 500 men. | | Commanded by Donald MacDonell of Lochgarry, this regiment included 80 to 100 men from Grant of Glenmoriston and Glen Urquhart. (Note: Grant of Glenmoriston's Battalion was commanded by Maj Patrick Grant of Glenmoriston and Alexander Grant, younger of Shewglie. About 30 men were killed at Culloden, though both Glenmoriston and Shewglie, younger escaped. Almost all of the survivors who surrendered on 4 May were transported.) |
| John Roy Stuart's Division (reserve) | Lord Lewis Gordon's Regiment | John Gordon of Avochie's Battalion: 300 men. | Commanded by John Gordon of Avochie. (Note: Sometimes referred to as the "Strathbogie" Battalion of Lord Lewis Gordon's Regiment, an intelligence report of 11 December 1745 stated most were "herds and hiremen from about Strathbogie and unaquainted with the use of arms, many are pressed and intend to desert ...".) |
| John Roy Stuart's Division (reserve) | Lord Lewis Gordon's Regiment | Moir of Stonywood's Battalion: 200 men. | Recruited from Aberdeenshire by James Moir of Stonywood. |
| John Roy Stuart's Division (reserve) | 1/Lord Ogilvy's Regiment: 200 men. | | Commanded by Thomas Blair of Glassclune. |
| John Roy Stuart's Division (reserve) | 2/Lord Ogilvy's Regiment: 300 men. | | Commanded by Sir James Johnstone. |
| John Roy Stuart's Division (reserve) | John Roy Stuart's Regiment: ~ 200 men. | | Commanded by Major Patrick Stuart, who held a commission in the French Army. Raised in Edinburgh, it included deserters from the British Army, and stood in the front line at Culloden, next to the Stewarts of Appin. |
| John Roy Stuart's Division (reserve) | Footguards: ~ 200 men. | | Commanded by William, Lord Kilmarnock. A composite unit formed in March 1746 by combining the dismounted Lord Kilmarnock's Horse, Lord Pisligo's Horse, and James Crichton of Auchingoul's Regiment, as well as forced recruits from Aberdeenshire, courtesy of Lady Erroll (mother-in-law to Lord Kilmarnock). |
| John Roy Stuart's Division (reserve) | Glenbucket's Regiment: 200 men. | | Commanded by John Gordon of Glenbucket. |
| John Roy Stuart's Division (reserve) | Duke of Perth's Regiment: 300 men. | | Commanded by James Drummond, Master of Strathallan, this unit included two companies of MacGregors, commanded by James Mor Drummond. |
| Irish Brigade | Royal-Ecossais: 350 men. | | Commanded by Lieutenant-Colonel Lord Lewis Drummond. |
| Irish Brigade | Irish Picquets: 302 men. | | Commanded by Lieutenant-Colonel Walter Stapleton. |
| Cavalry (Commanded by Sir John MacDonald of Fitzjames' Horse) | Right Squadron | Fitzjames' Horse: 70 men. | Commanded by Capt William Bagot. |
| Cavalry (Commanded by Sir John MacDonald of Fitzjames' Horse) | Right Squadron | Lifeguards: 30 men. | Commanded by David, Lord Elcho. |
| Cavalry (Commanded by Sir John MacDonald of Fitzjames' Horse) | Left Squadron | Scotch Hussars: 36 men. | Commanded by Maj John Bagot. |
| Cavalry (Commanded by Sir John MacDonald of Fitzjames' Horse) | Left Squadron | Strathallan's Horse: 30 men. | Commanded by William, Lord Strathallan. |
| Artillery | 11 × 3-pounders. | | Commanded by Capt John Finlayson. |
| Artillery | 1 × 4-pounders. | | Commanded by Capt du Saussay. |

== Government army ==
=== Composition ===
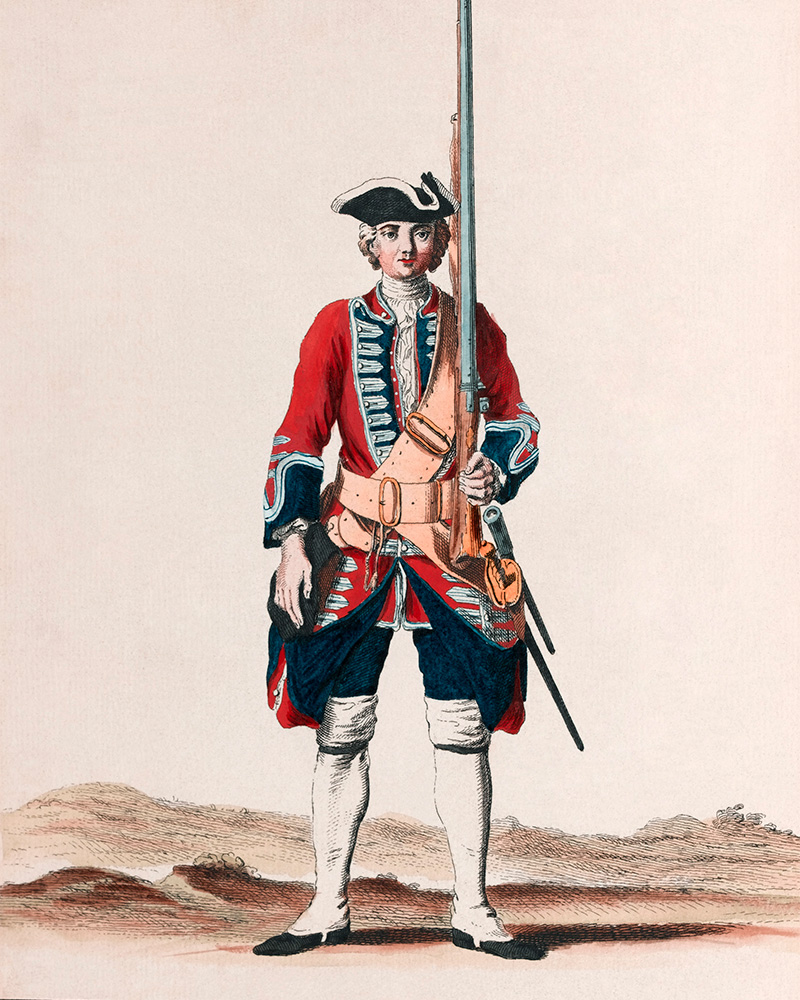
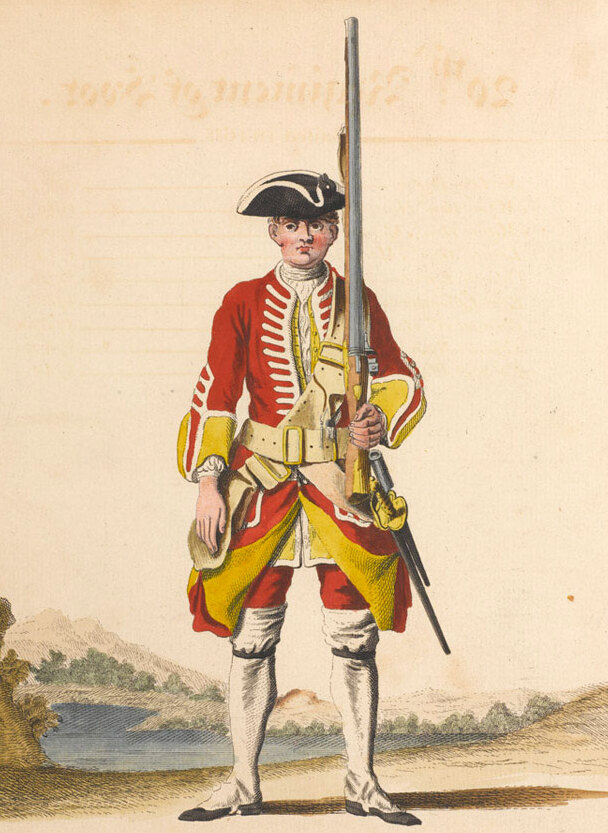
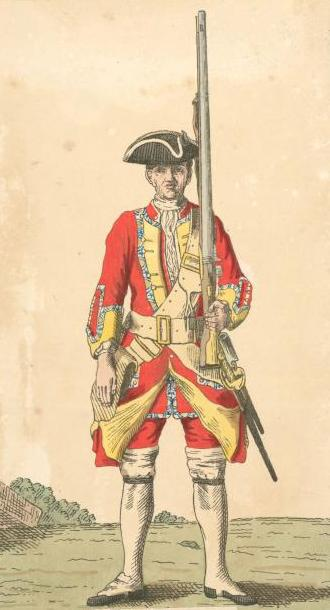
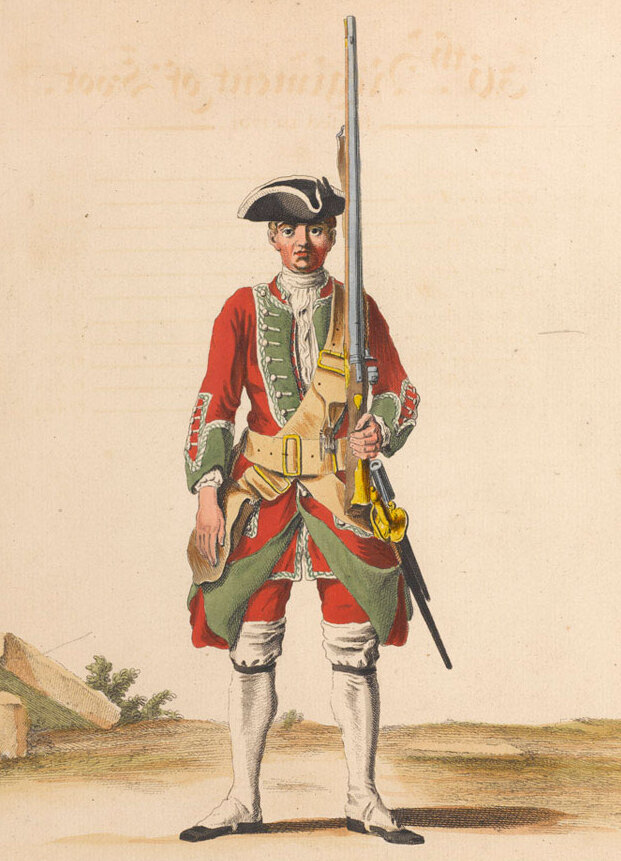
Soldiers of the 8th, 20th, 34th, 36th and 59th Regiments, c. 1742

Cumberland's army at Culloden comprised 16 infantry battalions, including four Scottish units and one Irish. The bulk of the infantry units had already seen action at Falkirk, but had been further drilled, rested and resupplied since then.

Many of the infantry were experienced veterans of Continental service, but on the outbreak of the Jacobite rising, extra incentives were given to recruits to fill the ranks of depleted units. On 6 September 1745, every recruit who joined the Guards before 24 September was given £6, and those who joined in the last days of the month were given £4. In theory, a standard single-battalion British infantry regiment was 815 strong, including officers, but was often smaller in practice and at Culloden, the regiments were not much larger than about 400 men.

The government cavalry arrived in Scotland in January 1746. Many were not combat experienced, having spent the preceding years on anti-smuggling duties. A standard cavalryman had a Land Service pistol and a carbine, but the main weapon used by the British cavalry was a sword with a 35-inch blade.

The Royal Artillery vastly outperformed their Jacobite counterparts during the Battle of Culloden. However, until this point in the campaign, the government artillery had performed dismally. The main weapon of the artillery was the 3-pounder. This weapon had a range of 500 yards (460 m) and fired two kinds of shot: round iron and canister. The other weapon used was the Coehorn mortar. These had a calibre of 4 2/5 inches (11 cm).

=== Government Order of Battle ===
Captain-General: Duke of Cumberland
Commander-in-Chief North Britain: Lieutenant-General Henry Hawley

| Division | Unit | | Notes |
|---|---|---|---|
| Escort troop | Duke of Cumberland's Hussars: ~ 20 men. | | Made up of Austrians and Germans. |
| Advance Guard (Commanded by Maj-Gen Humphrey Bland) | 10th (Cobham's) Dragoons: 276 officers & men. | | Commanded by Maj Peter Chaban. |
| Advance Guard (Commanded by Maj-Gen Humphrey Bland) | 11th (Kerr's) Dragoons: 267 officers & men. | | Commanded by Lt Col William, Lord Ancram. |
| Advance Guard (Commanded by Maj-Gen Humphrey Bland) | The Highland Battalion: ~ 300 rank and file. | | The Highland Battalion consisted of eight companies of soldiers, some regular and some militia. Four of these companies were from the Campbell of Argyll Militia, three of these companies were from Loudon's 64th Highland Regiment and one company was from the 43rd (Black Watch) Highland Regiment. The battalion was commanded by Lt Col John Campbell, 5th Duke of Argyll of the 64th Highlanders. There was also one non-regimented Independent Highland Company (militia) present at the battle that had been raised by William Sutherland, 17th Earl of Sutherland, but it was kept in reserve. |
| Front Line (1st Division) (Maj-Gen William Anne van Keppel, Earl of Albemarle) | First Brigade | 2/1st (Royal) Regiment: 401 rank & file. | Commanded by Lt Col John Ramsay. |
| Front Line (1st Division) (Maj-Gen William Anne van Keppel, Earl of Albemarle) | First Brigade | 34th (Cholmondeley's) Foot: 339 rank & file. | Commanded by Lt Col Charles Jeffreys. |
| Front Line (1st Division) (Maj-Gen William Anne van Keppel, Earl of Albemarle) | First Brigade | 14th (Price's) Foot: 304 rank & file. | Commanded by Lt Col John Grey. |
| Front Line (1st Division) (Maj-Gen William Anne van Keppel, Earl of Albemarle) | Third Brigade | 21st (Royal North British) Fusiliers: 358 rank & file. | Commanded by Maj Charles Colvill. |
| Front Line (1st Division) (Maj-Gen William Anne van Keppel, Earl of Albemarle) | Third Brigade | 37th (Dejean's) Foot: 426 rank & file. | Commanded by Col Louis Dejean. |
| Front Line (1st Division) (Maj-Gen William Anne van Keppel, Earl of Albemarle) | Third Brigade | 4th (Barrell's) Foot: 325 rank & file. | Commanded by Lt Col Robert Rich. |
| Second Line (Commanded by Maj-Gen John Huske) | Second Brigade | 3rd Foot (Buffs): 413 rank & file. | Commanded by Lt Col George Howard. |
| Second Line (Commanded by Maj-Gen John Huske) | Second Brigade | 36th (Fleming's) Foot: 350 rank & file. | Commanded by Lt Col George Jackson. |
| Second Line (Commanded by Maj-Gen John Huske) | Second Brigade | 20th (Sackville's) Foot: 412 rank & file. | Commanded by Col Lord George Sackville. |
| Second Line (Commanded by Maj-Gen John Huske) | Fourth Brigade (Brig-Gen Lord Hugh Sempill) | 25th (Sempill's) Foot: 429 rank & file. | Commanded by Lt Col David Cunynghame. |
| Second Line (Commanded by Maj-Gen John Huske) | Fourth Brigade (Brig-Gen Lord Hugh Sempill) | 59th (Conway's) Foot: 325 rank & file. | Commanded by Col Henry Conway. |
| Second Line (Commanded by Maj-Gen John Huske) | Fourth Brigade (Brig-Gen Lord Hugh Sempill) | 8th (Edward Wolfe's) Foot: 324 rank & file. | Commanded by Lt Col Edward Martin. |
| Reserve | Duke of Kingston's 10th Horse: 211 officers & men. | | Commanded by Lt Col John Mordaunt. |
| Reserve | Fifth Brigade (Brig-Gen John Mordaunt) | 13th (Pulteney's) Foot: 510 rank & file. | Commanded by Lt Col Thomas Cockayne. |
| Reserve | Fifth Brigade (Brig-Gen John Mordaunt) | 62nd (Batereau's) Foot: 354 rank & file. | Commanded by Col John Batereau. |
| Reserve | Fifth Brigade (Brig-Gen John Mordaunt) | 27th (Blakeney's) Foot: 300 rank & file. | Commanded by Lt Col Francis Leighton. |
| Artillery | 106 NCOs & Gunners; 10 × 3-pounder cannon 6 × Coehorn mortars | | Commanded by Commander Royal Artillery (CRA): Maj William Belford and Captain-Lieutenant John Godwin. |

See the following reference for source of tables (Note: Unless noted elsewhere, units and unit sizes are from, Reid (2002), pp. 26–27)

== British Army casualties ==
| Regiment | Killed | Wounded |
|---|---|---|
| 1st (Royal) Regiment | 0 | 4 |
| 3rd Foot (Buffs) | 1 | 2 |
| 4th (Barrell's) Foot | 17 | 108 |
| 8th (Wolfe's) Foot | 0 | 1 |
| 13th (Pulteney's) Foot | 0 | 0 |
| 14th (Price's) Foot | 1 | 9 |
| 20th (Sackville's) Foot | 4 | 17 |
| 21st (North British) Fusiliers | 0 | 7 |
| 25th (Sempill's) Foot | 1 | 13 |
| 34th (Cholmondley's) Foot | 1 | 2 |
| 36th (Fleming's) Foot | 0 | 6 |
| 37th (Dejean's) Foot | 14 | 68 |
| 59th (Conway's) Foot (Note: Renamed the 48th Foot in 1748.) | 1 | 5 |
| 62nd (Batereau's) Foot | 0 | 3 |
| 64th (Loudon's) Foot | 6 | 3 |
| Argyll Militia | 0 | 1 |
| Royal Artillery | 0 | 6 |
| Duke of Kingston's 10th Horse | 0 Horses: 2 | 1 Horses: 1 |
| 10th (Cobham's) Dragoons | 1 Horses: 4 | 0 Horses: 5 |
| 11th (Kerr's) Dragoons | 3 Horses: 4 | 3 Horses: 15 |

See following reference for source of table

== See also ==
- List of orders of battle

== Sources ==
- Aikman, Christian (2001). No Quarter Given: The Muster Roll of Prince Charles Edward Stuart's Army, 1745–46. Neil Wilson Publishing. ISBN 978-1903238028.
- Barthorp, Michael (1982). The Jacobite Rebellions 1689–1745 (Men-at-arms series). Osprey Publishing. ISBN 0-85045-432-8.
- Harrington, Peter (1991). Chandler, David G. (ed.). Culloden 1746, The Highland Clans' Last Charge. Osprey Publishing. ISBN 978-1-85532-158-8.
- Pittock, Murray (1998). Jacobitism (British History in Perspective). Palgrave Macmillan. ISBN 978-0312213060.
- Reid, Stuart (1996). 1745, A Military History of the Last Jacobite Rising. Sarpedon. ISBN 978-1-885119-28-5.
- Reid, Stuart (1997). Highland Clansman 1689–1746. Osprey Publishing. ISBN 978-1-85532-660-6.
- Reid, Stuart (2002). Culloden Moor 1746: The Death of the Jacobite Cause. Osprey Publishing. ISBN 978-1-84176-412-2.
- Reid, Stuart (2006). The Scottish Jacobite Army 1745–46. Elite series. Vol. 149. Osprey Publishing. ISBN 978-1-84603-073-4.
- Szechi, Daniel; Sankey, Margaret (November 2001). "Elite Culture and the Decline of Scottish Jacobitism 1716–1745". Past & Present (2): 90–128. doi:10.1093/past/173.1.90. JSTOR 3600841.
