= Walter Stapleton =

Walter Stapleton may refer to:

- Walter King Stapleton (born 1934), American judge
- Walter Stapleton (politician) (born 1947), New Hampshire politician
- Walter Stapleton (soldier), 18th century Irish soldier

== See also ==
- Walter Stapledon (died 1326), Bishop of Exeter and Lord High Treasurer of England
- Walker Stapleton (born 1974), American politician
