= Skirmish of Dunfermline =

1715 skirmish

- Part of Jacobite rising of 1715
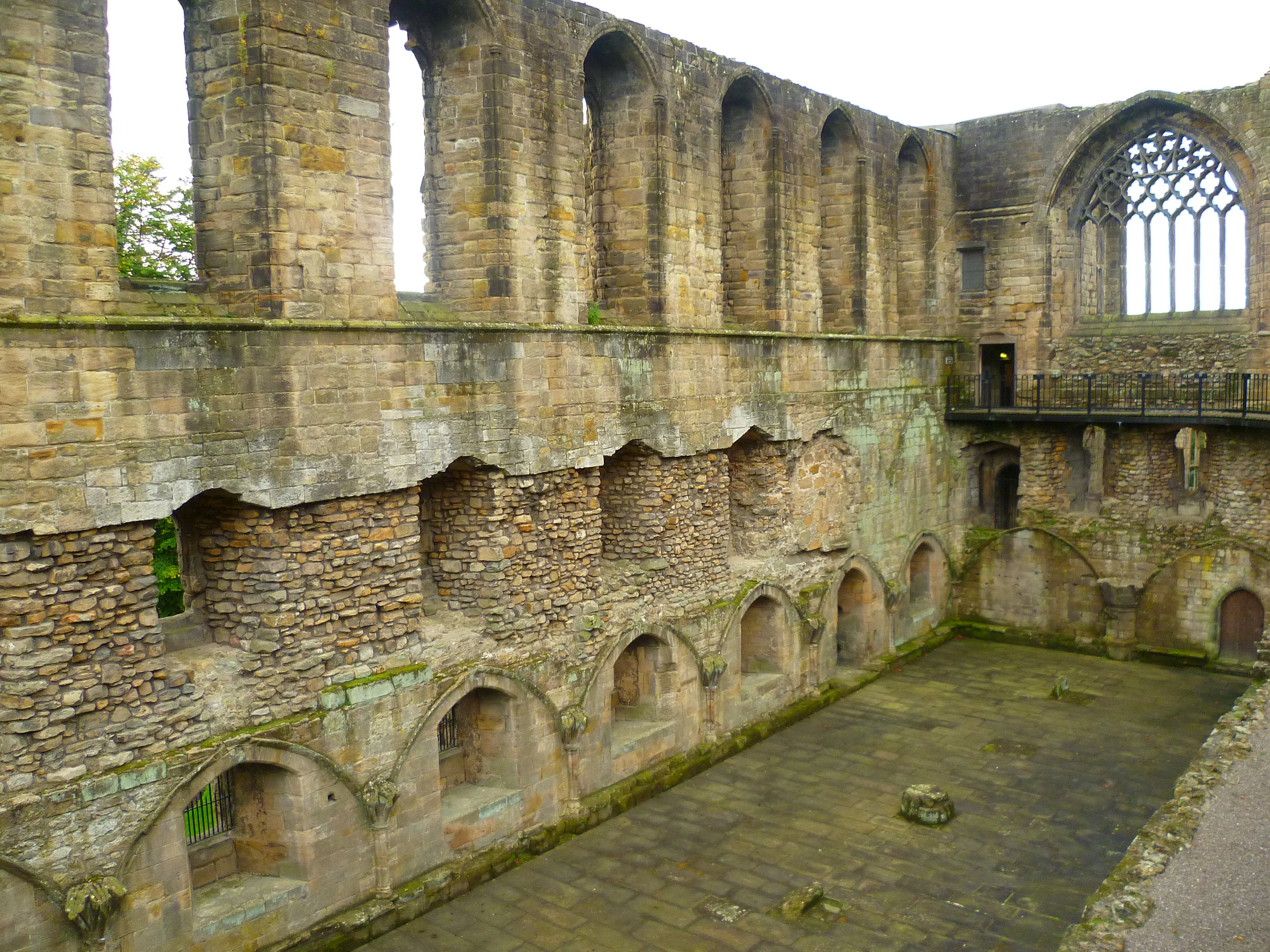
- Ruins at Dunfermline Abbey where the Jacobite Highlanders were encamped
Date	24 October 1715
Location	Dunfermline, Scotland
Result	British-Hanoverian Government victory

Belligerents
Scottish Hanoverian supporters	Jacobite clans

Commanders and leaders
John Campbell, 2nd Duke of Argyll; Lieutenant-Colonel Charles Cathcart	James Malcolm of Grange; John Gordon of Glenbucket

Strength
120 Dragoons; 30 dismounted troops	80 horse 300 Highlanders

Casualties and losses
1 man wounded and 1 horse wounded.	4 killed and 2 mortally wounded 17 men taken prisoner

The Skirmish of Dunfermline was a conflict that took place on 24 October 1715 in Dunfermline, Scotland and was part of the Jacobite rising of 1715. It was fought between the forces of John Campbell, 2nd Duke of Argyll who supported the British-Hanoverian Government against a Jacobite force.

== Background ==
On 23 October 1715 during the Jacobite rising of 1715, John Campbell, 2nd Duke of Argyll, chief of Clan Campbell, learned that a party of rebel Jacobites were passing by Castle Campbell. The Jacobite force consisted of approximately 80 horse and 300 Highlanders and Argyll had heard from one of his outposts that they were heading for Fife, where they were going to levy supplies to support the main Jacobite army at Perth. Argyll dispatched a squadron of dragoons under Lieutenant-Colonel Charles Cathcart to intercept them. On 24 October Cathcart had caught up with the Jacobites at Dunfermline.

The Jacobites' security was poor: Their commander, James Malcolm of Grange, was confident that he knew the area and its approaches well and so he only posted one sentry at the bridge into the Stirling end of the town. He also allowed his forces to be divided up when they took quarters. The Highlanders were under John Gordon of Glenbucket and they camped in a ruined abbey on the edge of the town. The Jacobite horse took up residence without any order in the taverns and private houses throughout the town. The Jacobites did not fix any rendezvous point where they were to meet in any alarm post and the officers settled down for a bottle of wine.

== Skirmish ==
The Jacobite position was scouted by Cathcart in the night and he attacked at 5 a.m. from the eastern side of Dunfermline with 120 mounted dragoons. This was preceded by a noisy fire fight with the Highlanders in the abbey that had been commenced by 30 of Cathcart's dismounted men. This brought the Jacobite cavalry scrambling out of their beds and into the street in confusion, trying to find their horses and get mounted. Cathcart then charged them, killing four and mortally wounding two more. He then rode through the town and rejoined his dismounted detachment and had taken seventeen prisoners. Cathcart only suffered one man and one horse wounded. Another account says that about twenty Jacobites were taken prisoner.

== Aftermath ==
The Skirmish of Dunfermline was the only occasion when the Duke of Argyll launched a major raid on the Jacobites before December 1715 when Dutch and Swiss reinforcements arrived. This meant that the Jacobites were allowed free rein to recruit and otherwise do as they please in Fife until late December. This boosted their confidence and resources available to them.
