= Jacobite Army (1745) =

Military force assembled by Charles Edward Stuart during the 1745 Rising

- Jacobite standard, 1745
- Active: 1745–1746
- Allegiance: House of Stuart
- Size: 9,000 to 14,000
- Engagements: Jacobite rising of 1745: Battle of Prestonpans; First Siege of Carlisle; Clifton Moor Skirmish; Second Siege of Carlisle; Battle of Falkirk Muir; Battle of Culloden

Commanders
- Notable commanders: Charles Edward Stuart; Lord George Murray; John Drummond; James Drummond, 3rd Duke of Perth; John William O'Sullivan; Viscount Strathallan †

The Jacobite Army, sometimes referred to as the Highland Army, was the military force assembled by Charles Edward Stuart and his Jacobite supporters during the 1745 Rising that attempted to restore the House of Stuart to the British throne.

Starting with less than 1,000 men at Glenfinnan in August 1745, the Jacobite army won a significant victory at Prestonpans in September. A force of about 5,500 then invaded England in November and reached as far south as Derby before successfully retreating into Scotland. Reaching a peak strength of between 9,000 and 14,000, they won another victory in January 1746 at Falkirk, before defeat at Culloden in April. While a large number of Jacobites remained in arms, lack of external and domestic support combined with overwhelming government numbers meant they dispersed, ending the rebellion.

Once characterised as a largely Gaelic-speaking force recruited from the Scottish Highlands using traditional weapons and tactics, modern historians have demonstrated this was only partially accurate. The army also included a large number of north-eastern and lowland Scots, along with substantial Franco-Irish and English contingents, who were drilled and organised in line with contemporary European military practices.

== Formation and leadership ==
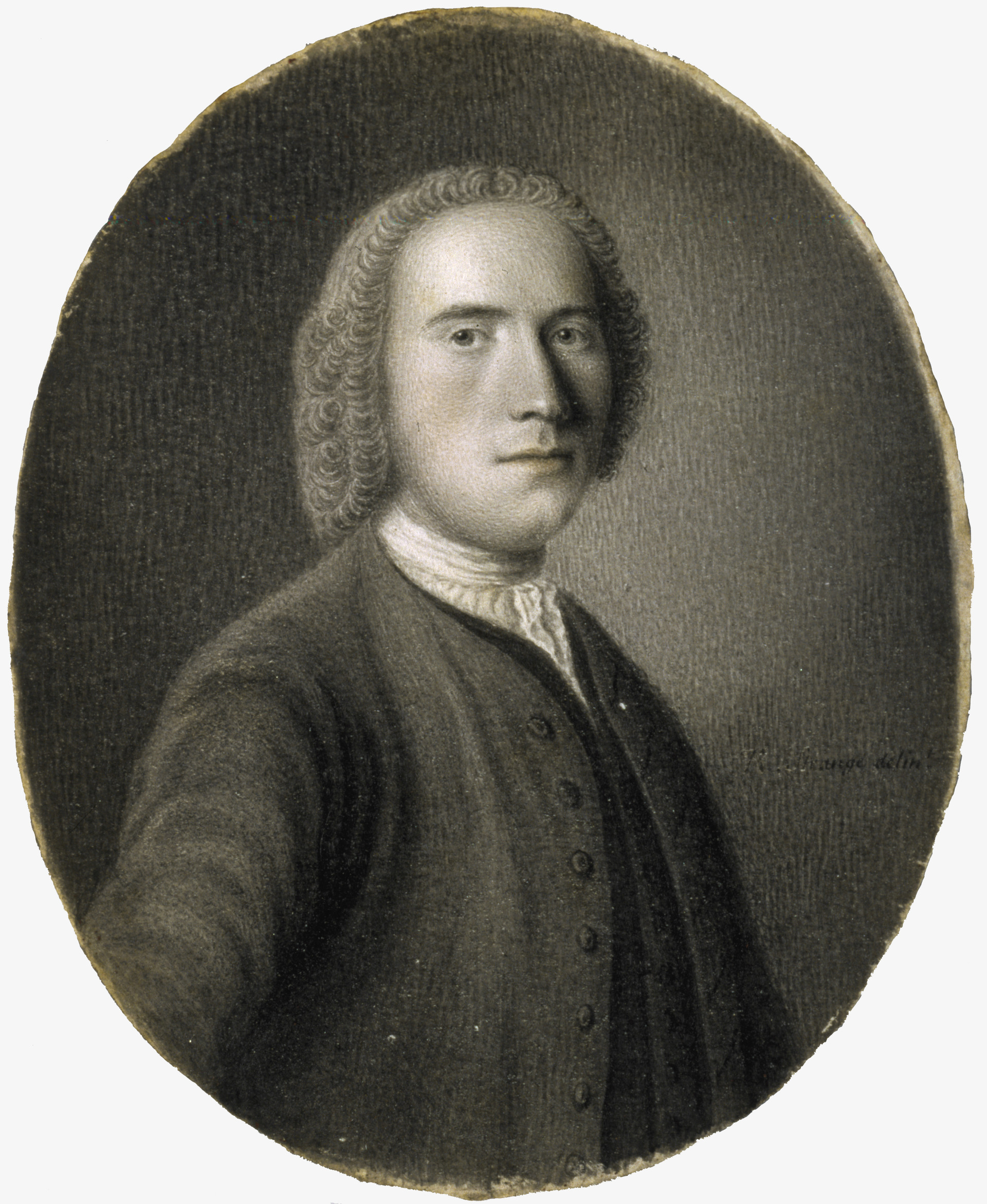
Lord George Murray, Jacobite lieutenant-general; while possessing considerable talents, his inability to take advice and personality clashes with Charles became a major factor in the campaign

Charles left France on 15 July aboard Du Teillay, supplies and 70 volunteers from the Irish Brigade transported by Elizabeth, an elderly 64-gun warship. Four days out, they were intercepted by HMS Lion which engaged Elizabeth; after a four hour battle, both were forced to return to port, while Du Teillay continued to Eriskay. This meant Charles arrived with few weapons, accompanied only by the "Seven Men of Moidart," among them the elderly Marquess of Tullibardine and John O'Sullivan, an Irish-born officer in the French army.

Many of those contacted on arrival told Charles to return to France but Lochiel's commitment persuaded enough for the Rebellion to be launched at Glenfinnan on 19 August. O'Sullivan estimated initial numbers as around 1,000, with 700 Camerons plus several hundred men from Lochaber led by Keppoch.

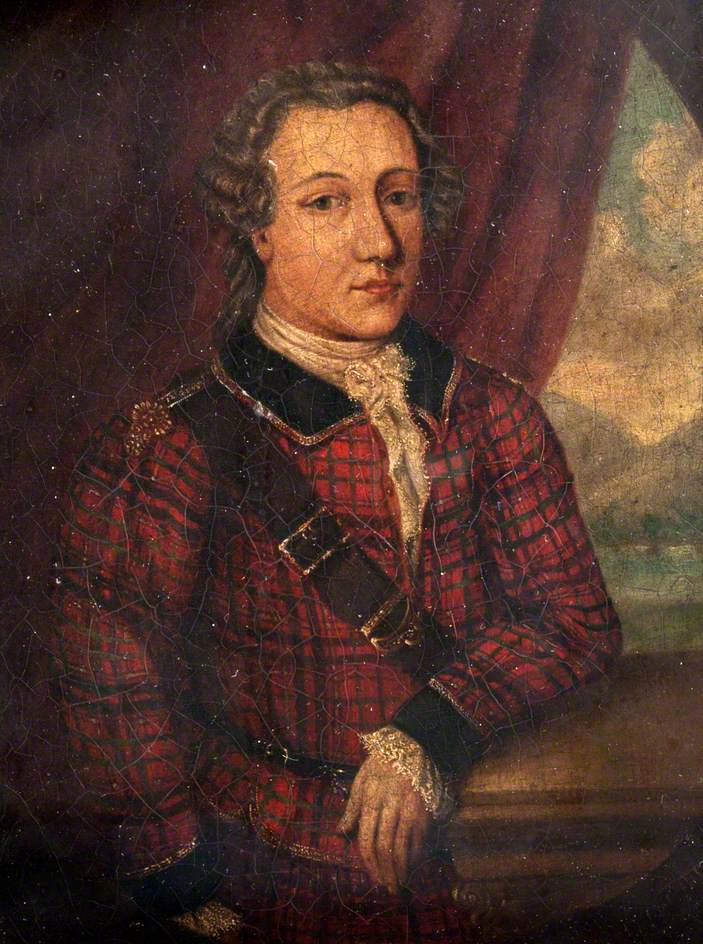
Donald Cameron of Lochiel; his adherence was vital in the early stages but he lacked military experience

Though physically fit, they lacked discipline and were poorly armed, accentuating the loss of Elizabeth with its weapons and the regulars intended to provide the core of the Jacobite army. Although Charles was in nominal command, his inexperience meant O'Sullivan acted as adjutant-general and quartermaster-general, handling personnel, training and logistics.

O'Sullivan created an army organised along conventional European lines and his use of the then-novel divisional structure is viewed as a major factor in the Jacobites' speed of movement. Further recruits came in as they marched on Edinburgh; by the time of Prestonpans on 21 September, numbers had increased to around 2,500.

One of these recruits was Tullibardine's younger brother, Lord George Murray, who took part in the failed Risings of 1715 and 1719. Despite this, his acceptance of a pardon in 1725 and swearing an Oath of Allegiance to George II in 1739 made some suspicious, including Charles' chief Scottish advisor, Murray of Broughton. Although primarily driven by Broughton's political ambitions, others recorded Murray's genuine military talents were undermined by a quick temper, arrogance and inability to take advice.

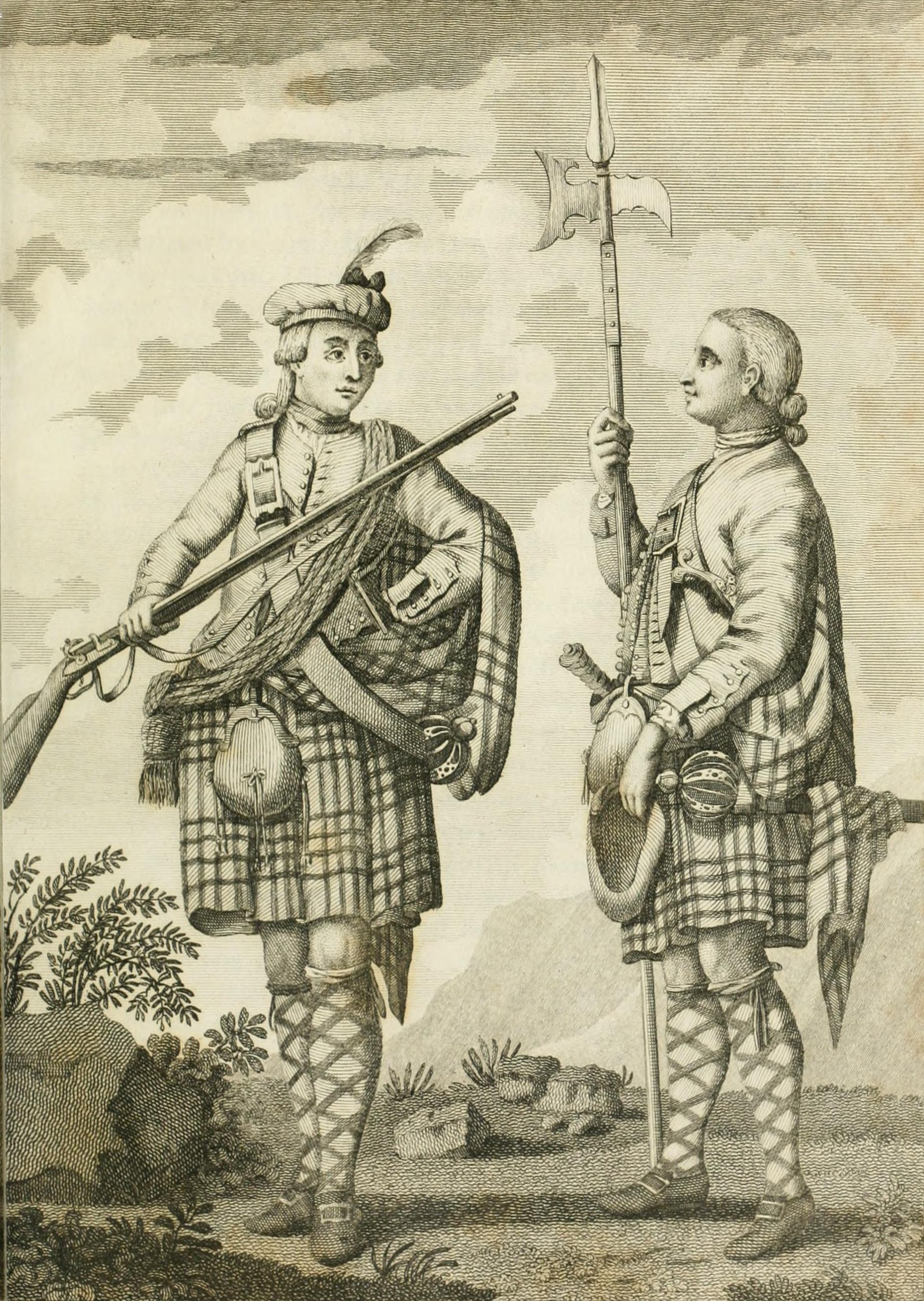
Members of a Highland regiment, circa 1740; the Jacobite army would have worn something very similar, particularly the belted plaid.

Co-operation with O'Sullivan was essential but failed to develop, Murray arguing Highland customs better suited the bulk of their recruits and it was unrealistic to expect them to execute weapons drill or carry out written orders. Others considered these views outdated, including Sir John MacDonald, an Irish exile who acted as Inspector-General of Cavalry. There was some truth in both positions; plenty of Scots served in European armies but the military aspects of clan society had been in decline for decades and most Highland levies were illiterate agricultural workers.

Even for regular troops, training was a concern as infantry drill became increasingly complex; before and after 1746, peacetime inspections consistently noted an alarmingly high number of British regiments as 'Not fit for service.' This had many causes, one of the most significant being lack of live firing practice and the Jacobites were short of both weapons and ammunition. The exiles also failed to appreciate the Highland obligation to provide military service assumed short periods of warfare, not continuous service for six months or a year. After Prestonpans and Falkirk, the clan chiefs could not prevent large numbers of their levies returning home; when Charles wanted to attack Cumberland in early February 1746, he was told the army was in no state to fight a battle.

Charles considered his 'Lieutenant-Generals' subordinates, whose duty was to comply with his orders; Murray disagreed and matters were not helped by a furious row between the two prior to Prestonpans. Lord Elcho later wrote the Scots were concerned from the beginning by Charles' autocratic style and fears he was overly influenced by his Irish advisors.

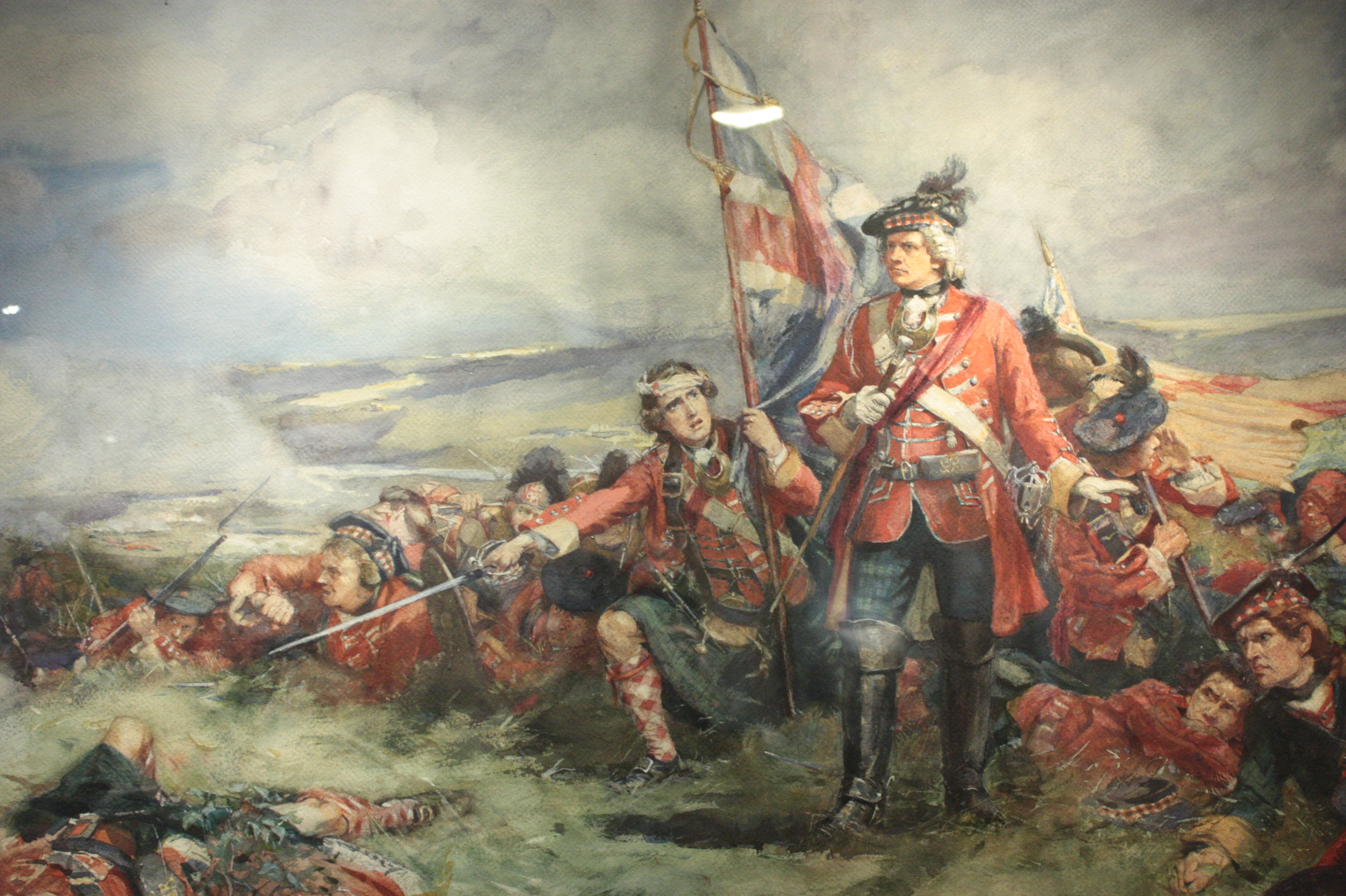
The Black Watch at Fontenoy, April 1745; an example of highly effective and conventionally trained Highland troops

At their insistence, Charles established a "Council of War" to agree military strategy but deeply resented what he viewed as an imposition by subjects on their divinely appointed monarch. Consisting of 15-20 senior leaders, it was dominated by the Highlanders who provided most of the manpower and decisions reflected their priorities. (Note: Of the ten regiments raised in the Western Highlands alone, six (Lochiel's, Keppoch's, Clanranald's, Glencoe's, Glengarry's and Stewart of Appin) had representatives on the seventeen-man Council of War, while the Atholl Brigade had two) The civilian equivalent or 'Privy Council' had a higher proportion of Lowland gentry, thus dividing leadership between competing power centres.

Viscount Strathallan was appointed commander in Scotland and continued recruiting, while the field army of roughly 5,500 invaded England in early November. Command was split between the three lieutenant-generals: Murray, Tullibardine, and James Drummond, titular Duke of Perth. In theory, the three rotated command on a daily basis, but Tullibardine's poor health and Perth's inexperience meant in practice it was exercised by Murray.

Charles' relationship with the Scots began to deteriorate during pre-invasion discussions in Edinburgh and worsened when Murray resigned at Carlisle prior to being reinstated. After Derby, the War Council met only once more, an acrimonious session at Crieff in February 1746. Disappointment and heavy drinking resulted in repeated accusations by Charles that the Scots were traitors, reinforced when Murray advised abandoning plans to invade England. Instead, he proposed an insurgency in the Highlands that would "...oblige the Crown to come to terms, because the war rendered it necessary...English troops be occupied elsewhere".

In late November, Perth's brother John Drummond landed in Scotland and replaced Strathallan but his arrival introduced another element of division into the Jacobite leadership. He and Charles previously clashed in France and his first act was to countermand instructions new recruits be sent into England; as an officer in the French army, he had orders not to leave Scotland until all fortresses held by British government troops had been taken. Since he brought money, weapons, siege artillery and 150 Scots and Irish regulars, he could not be ignored; at Falkirk and Culloden, O'Sullivan exercised effective command, with Murray, Perth and Drummond as brigade commanders but the different factions viewed each other with suspicion and hostility.

== Recruitment ==
=== Areas of recruitment ===
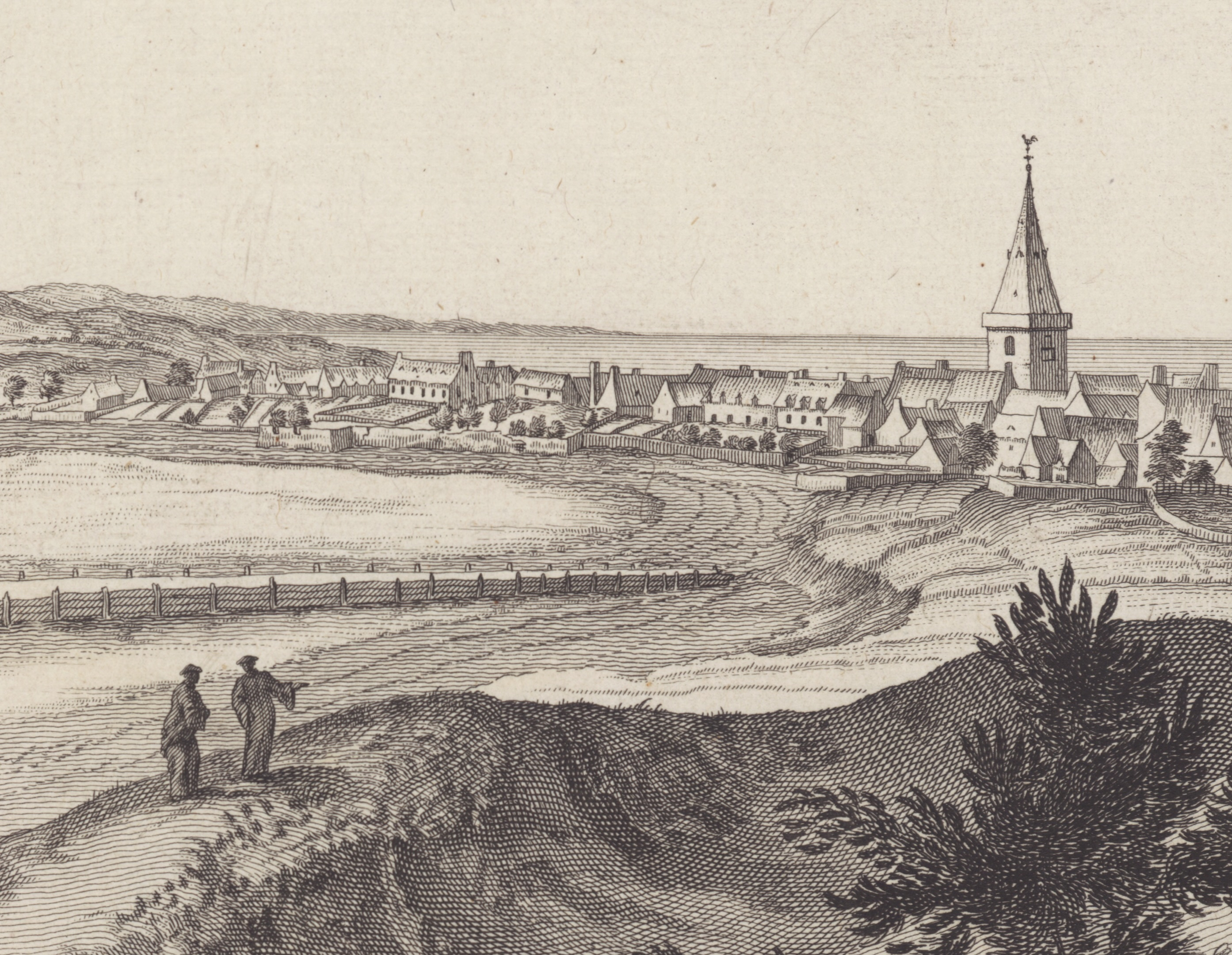
Montrose, depicted in 1678. The town, along with the north-eastern coast generally, was a source of Jacobite recruits.

In contrast to 1715, many joined the Jacobites in 1745 for reasons other than Stuart loyalism. While 46% of the Jacobite army came from the Highlands and Islands, there is no evidence this was any more common in the Highlands post-1715 than elsewhere in Scotland.

A key factor in recruiting was the feudal nature of clan society, which obliged tenants to provide their landlord with military service; the majority of Highland recruits came from a small number of western clans whose leaders joined the rebellion, like Lochiel and Keppoch. This obligation was based on traditional clan warfare, which was short-term and emphasised raiding, rather than set piece battles; even experienced Highland generals like Montrose in 1645 or Dundee in 1689 struggled to keep their armies together and it continued to be a problem in 1745.

With the exception of the strongly Presbyterian south-west, the Jacobites also recruited outside the Highlands, although inevitably some were coerced. Jacobite leaders Lord George Murray, the Duke of Perth and Tullibardine had close links to Perthshire, which supplied around 20% of total recruits. Another 24% came from the north-east, where John Gordon of Glenbucket was one of the first to join the Rising; support was focused around Auchmedden, Pitsligo and Fyvie, areas Royalist and Episcopalian since the 1639 Bishops War.

The northeastern ports in particular provided significant numbers; by some estimates, up to a quarter of the adult male population of Montrose saw Jacobite service. Long after the Rising was over, the region continued to feature in Government reports as a centre of Jacobite 'disaffection', with the shipmasters of Montrose, Stonehaven, Peterhead and other ports involved in a two-way traffic of exiles and recruits for French service.

However, recruiting figures did not necessarily reflect majority opinion; even among 'Jacobite' clans like the MacDonalds, major figures like MacDonald of Sleat refused to join. The commercial centres of Edinburgh and Glasgow remained solidly pro-government, while in early November there were anti-Jacobite riots in Perth. This extended outside Scotland; after Prestonpans, Walter Shairp, a merchant from Edinburgh working in Liverpool, joined a local pro-government volunteer force known as the 'Liverpool Blues,' which participated in the second siege of Carlisle.

=== Recruiting methods and motivation ===
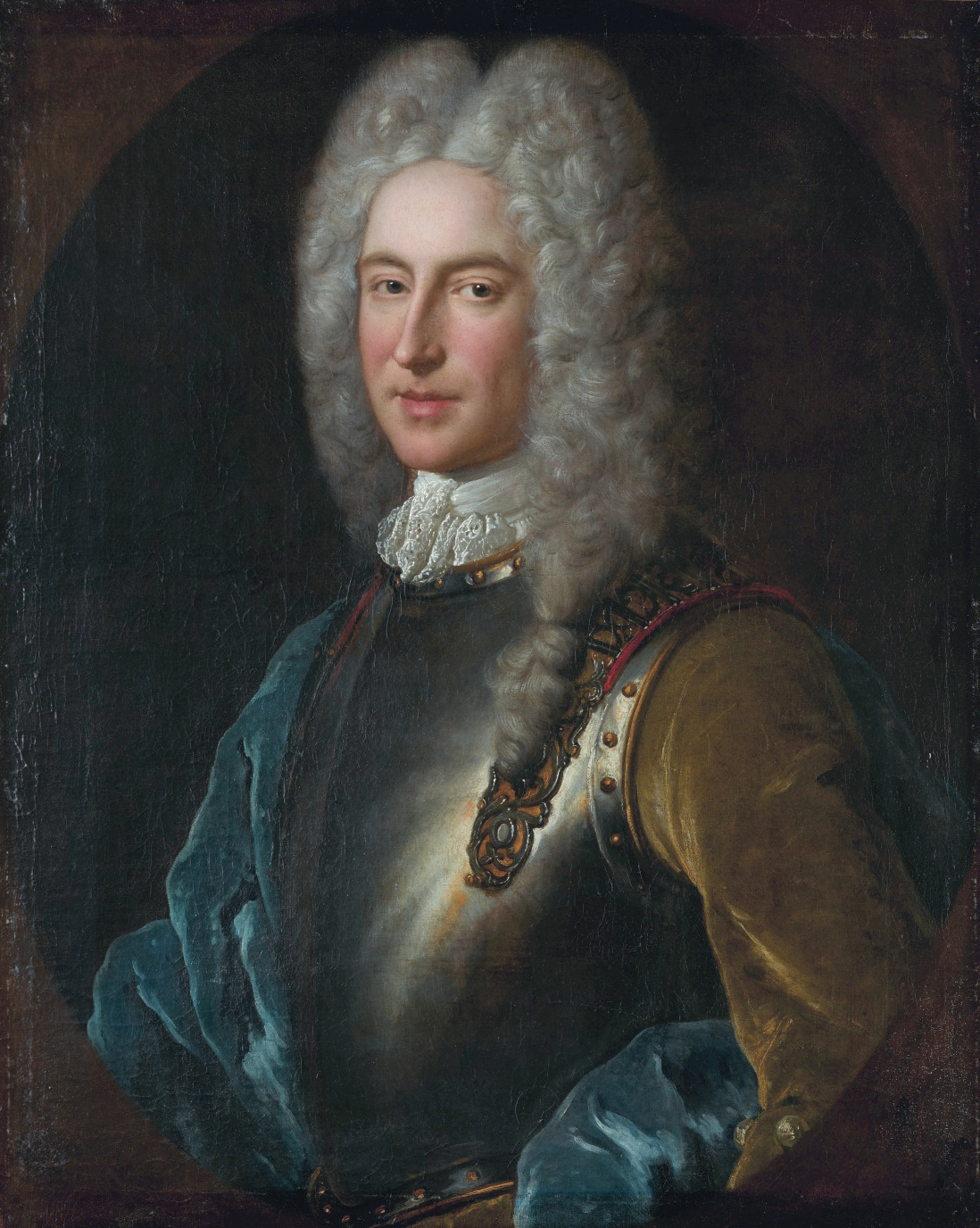
Many senior Jacobites, such as their "General of Horse" Forbes of Pitsligo, combined a history of Stuart loyalism with bitter opposition to the 1707 Acts of Union.

Jacobite recruiting methods in Scotland varied across the country. Adherence was fundamentally decided by personal or local factors, and often differed between officers and the rank and file.

==== Volunteers ====
While many volunteered simply for adventure, Stuart loyalism played a part, as did attempts by Charles to follow his predecessors in appealing to disenfranchised groups in general, whether religious or political.

The single most common issue for Scots volunteers was opposition to the 1707 Union between Scotland and England; after 1708, the exiled Stuarts explicitly appealed to this segment of society. They included James Hepburn of Keith, a fierce critic of both Catholicism and James II who viewed Union as 'humiliating to his country....'

Despite concerns over the impact on English sympathisers, Charles published two "Declarations" on 9 and 10 October, the first dissolving the "pretended Union," the second rejecting the 1701 Act of Settlement. A proposal to repeal the Malt Tax was particularly well received, one contemporary noting the rebels were "looked upon [...] as the deliverers of their country". However, taxes have always been unpopular and while it caused riots when first imposed in 1725, these quickly tailed off; the most serious demonstrations occurred in Glasgow, a town Charles noted as one 'where I have no friends and who are not at pains to hide it.'

Stuart support for religious toleration arose from their own Catholicism but its impact was limited. Modern use of the labels Episcopalian or Presbyterian imply differences in doctrine; in 1745, they primarily related to differences over governance of the Church of Scotland or kirk, and the Nonjuring schism over swearing allegiance to the Hanoverians. The vast majority of Scots, whether Episcopalian or Presbyterian, were doctrinal Calvinists, which facilitated the post-1707 readmission of many Episcopalians to the kirk. By 1745, Non-juring congregations were concentrated along the north-east coast, and many recruits came from this element of society.

Conversely, these factors help explain the lack of English support. Many Tories abandoned the Stuarts in 1688 when James' policies seemed to threaten the primacy of the Church of England; ensuring that remained a concern, whether it be from Catholics like Charles and his exile advisors or the Scots Calvinists that formed the bulk of his army. The only English town to provide any number of recruits was Manchester, also one of the very few to retain a significant Non-Juring congregation; its officers included three sons of its bishop Thomas Deacon.

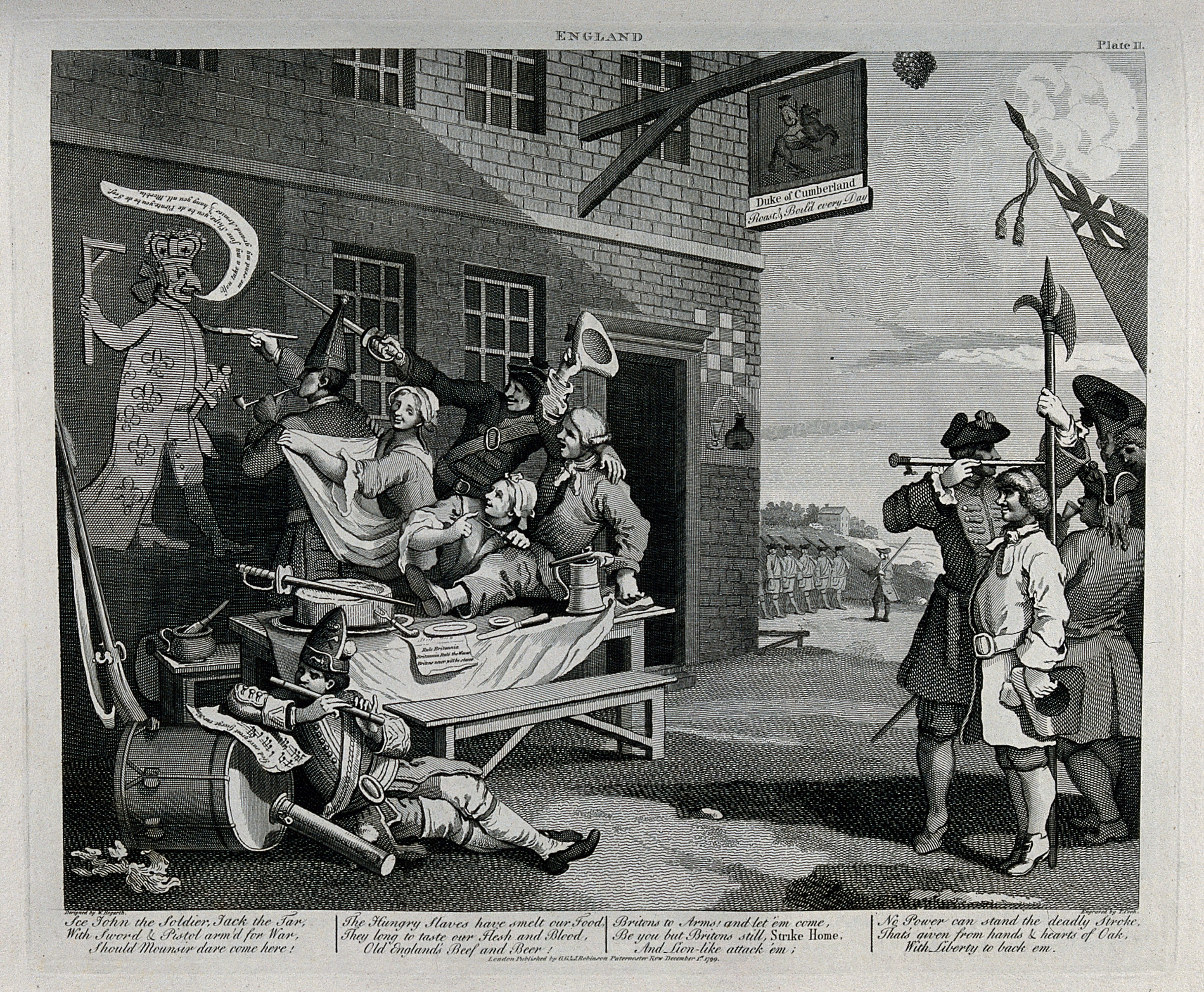
Enlisting soldiers by Hogarth ca 1750; in all armies, alcohol played a prominent part in recruiting.

While Francis Towneley, colonel of the Manchester Regiment, and other Jacobite officers were Catholic, contrary to government propaganda participants at all levels were overwhelmingly Protestant. There was even a Quaker at Culloden, Jonathan Forbes, laird of Brux in Aberdeenshire, one of the only places in Scotland to establish a meaningful Non-Conformist presence during the period of religious toleration under the Protectorate in the 1650s. Since a Stuart restoration was unlikely to improve the position of the Catholic Church, the link with Jacobitism was more likely a function of familial or other connections. (Note: Prominent Catholics involved in the Rising included the families of Clanranald and Glengarry; Keppoch; Barrisdale; and Gordon of Glastirum: Episcopalians included Murray, Lochiel (whose family also had strong Catholic connections), the Stewarts of Appin, and Lords Elcho, Ogilvy, Nairn, and Pitsligo)

In this period, regiments were formed by appointing captains, who then recruited their own companies, for which they would be paid. The structured nature of society meant this required men with social and financial standing, who could first attract recruits, then equip and pay them in advance; it was here the lack of support from the English gentry was most felt. Many Scots Episcopalians were from the higher social classes, while the military obligations of clan service made this much easier in the Highlands; in the Atholl Brigade, most volunteers were officers, connected by religion and familial links to the House of Atholl but the rank and file were essentially a conscript force.

==== Clan levies, vassalage, and impressment ====
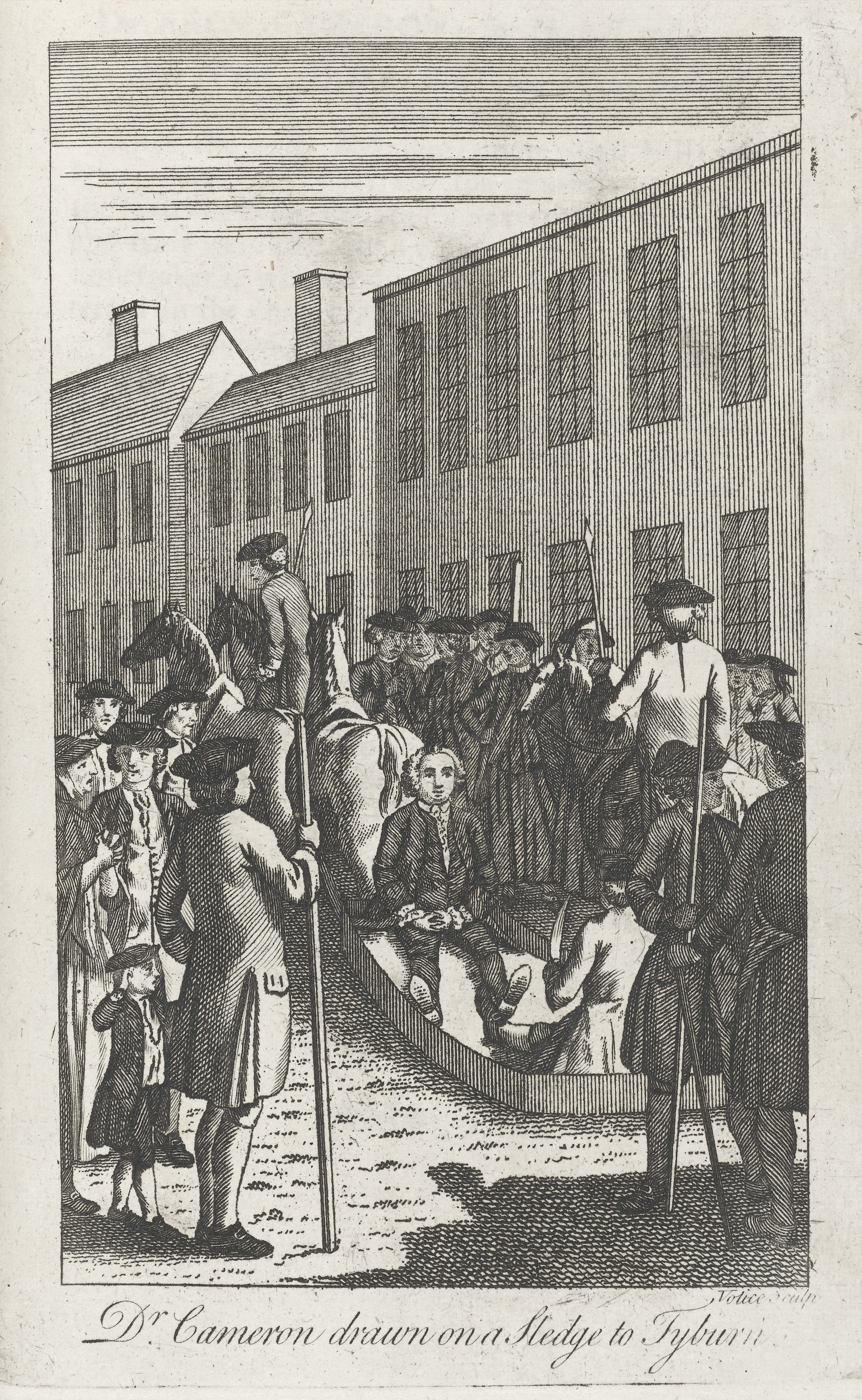
Archibald Cameron being taken to his execution, 1753; he was allegedly betrayed for his role in pressing recruits in 1745.

Many units were raised under the feudal obligation of vassalage, whereby tenants held land in return for military service. While this led authors like John Prebble to depict the Jacobites as a quasi-feudal army, the reality is more complex.

Clan chiefs in the north-west employed a traditional form of tenure requiring tacksmen to supply a number of armed sub-tenants on demand; this proved relatively successful, primarily because tenants strongly identified with the interests of their chief. A similar system was used in Perthshire and the north-east but here, tenants of landowners like Glenbucket held their leases in return for military service, irrespective of clan loyalties. Rents were held at a low level due to this expectation and few tenants had written leases, increasing the pressure on them to comply.

The extent of coercion or "forcing out" has long been an area of dispute, since it was a common defence used by rebels taken prisoner. The authorities rigorously investigated such claims and the consensus among historians is impressment was a significant factor, both in recruiting and retaining men. The short-term patterns of clan warfare meant this was especially true among Highlanders; after Prestonpans and Falkirk, many went home to secure their plunder, a factor that delayed the invasion of England and led to the retreat from Stirling.

Lochiel and Keppoch were among those alleged to have used threats of violence or eviction to conscript their tenants. Lochiel's main agent in this process was his younger brother Archibald Cameron; on his return from exile in 1753, he was allegedly betrayed by Cameron clansmen in revenge and later executed.

North-eastern landowners also had difficulty in recruiting tenants, even in districts that provided large numbers in 1715. Alexander MacDonald, then with the Jacobite army in Musselburgh, wrote to his father in October 1745 that Lord Lewis Gordon was "putting into prison all who are not willing to rise." One member of the Atholl Brigade claimed Mrs Robertson, daughter of his feudal superior Lady Nairne, "threatened to burn his house and effects" if he did not join; another claimed he was given the choice of enlisting or paying £50 Scots for a substitute. Some recruits were "ignorant even of the name of the unit they had joined".

Decisions were sometimes made contrary to the wishes, or even threats, of their chief; the men of Glen Urquhart committed to the Rising only after a "lengthy and mature debate" held on a Sunday in Kilmore churchyard. Despite the supposed strength of feudal bonds, many of Keppoch's men deserted early on after a "private quarrel" with him. Key predictors in recruiting seemed to have been a mixture of personal prestige or unequivocal action, with poor harvests in the Western Highlands in 1744 and 1745 also influencing enlistment among Highland farmers.

==== Deserters and conscripts ====
The Jacobite Army tried to recruit from among prisoners taken in battle, and such so-called 'deserters' came to form a significant source of manpower. A large group were drafted into the Irish Picquets from Guise's 6th Regiment of Foot after the surrender of their garrisons at Inverness and Fort Augustus; 98 were retaken at Culloden of whom many would have faced summary execution. Others, more accurately described as 'deserters', had previously absconded from the army in Flanders before returning to Scotland with the Irish Picquets or Royal Ecossais.

Many of the Jacobite regiments were themselves affected quite heavily by desertion and during the later phases of the rebellion the Jacobite administration implemented an equivalent of the old Scottish 'fencible' system, demanding that landowners provide one properly equipped man for every £100 of rent. The quotas were filled in various ways and one third of the Jacobites from Banffshire were reported to have been 'hired out by the County': as with the British army, paid substitution was also common, in which an individual hired another person to serve in their place. Such hired men were usually treated leniently after the Rising; many were released or simply left undisturbed at home.

The Jacobite recruiters could not afford to be selective and recruited many who would not have met later conscription standards. While some historical descriptions gave an impression of the Highland rank and file as being tall, healthy men in the prime of life, prisoner returns from after the Rising do not bear this out. The average height of Jacobite prisoners awaiting transportation in October 1746 was 5 feet 4.125 inches: 13.6% were 50 years old and upwards, while a further 8% were 16 and 17 year olds; contemporary observers commented on the "great number of boys and old men" in the Jacobite army. A number were also recorded as having physical and other disabilities: one man of Keppoch's regiment was stated to be a deaf-mute; John MacLennan of Glengarry's had club feet; Hugh Johnston and Matthew Matthews of the Manchester Regiment were blind in one eye and deaf respectively; William Hargrave was described as having a "distemper'd brain" and Alexander Haldane as "wrong in his judgment".

==== Regular soldiers in French service ====
HMS Lion and Elizabeth battle at sea, July 1745; the loss of her cargo of weapons and regular soldiers was a severe setback.

When Charles sailed from France in July 1745, he was accompanied by Elizabeth, an elderly 64-gun warship carrying most of the weapons and volunteers from the French Army's Irish Brigade. They were intercepted by HMS Lion and after a four hour battle with Elizabeth, both were forced to return to port, depriving Charles of the regular soldiers originally intended as the core of the Jacobite army.

Jacobite agents on the continent continued attempts to secure foreign backing; Daniel O'Brien, commander of the Franco-Irish Picquets, negotiated with Carl Fredrik Scheffer, Swedish ambassador in France, seeking to enlist 1,000 troops to be shipped from France to Scotland. While French caution ultimately led to the failure of the Swedish initiative, in October 1745 French foreign minister d'Argenson agreed to provide assistance to the Jacobites.

Regular troops in the Jacobite army came from three main sources, the first being the Royal Scots or Royal Ecossais. Originally recruited in August 1744 by John Drummond, it was landed in Montrose in November 1745 but despite attempts to raise a second battalion in Scotland, never totalled more than 400. The second was the Irish Brigade; each of the six regiments supplied 50 men but only half evaded the Royal Navy blockade. The third was the Fitzjames cavalry regiment; only one of the four squadrons despatched reached Scotland, and without their horses.

Including a small number of specialists, such as Mirabel de Gordon, the allegedly incompetent artillery officer who supervised the Siege of Stirling Castle, this implies a maximum of 600 to 700 regular troops. The numbers were well documented because regulars were treated as prisoners of war, rather than rebels and so the British government tracked them very carefully. The Irish detachment suffered 25% losses at Culloden and their sacrifice was crucial in enabling Charles to escape but there were never enough of them.

== Composition and organisation ==
=== Infantry ===
One of the few contemporary depictions of a Jacobite infantryman, by the anonymous 'Penicuik artist'. He carries a sword and a musket fitted with a bayonet.

The Jacobite infantry was initially divided into two divisions, 'Highland' and 'Low Country Foot', nominally commanded by Murray and Perth, who was replaced by Charles after Carlisle. Following British army custom, they were split into regiments, usually of one battalion, although some had two after the French model. Each battalion had a nominal strength of 200 to 300 men, although actual numbers were often much smaller, subdivided into companies. The regiments of Lochiel, Glengarry and Ogilvy also had grenadier companies, although how these were distinguished is not recorded.

Highland regiments were traditionally organised by clan, officered by their own tacksmen; this made some impractically small and efforts were made to amalgamate them to produce more evenly sized units. Commissions were often used to reward those who brought in recruits, while O'Sullivan noted the Highlanders "would not mix or separate, & wou'd have double officers, [that] is two Captns & two Lts, to each Compagny, strong or weak". These factors meant the Jacobite army was over-officered, as recorded by the Master of Sinclair.

While successful with Lowland recruits, Highland military tradition was unsuited to the European-style army O'Sullivan wanted to create. Even professional soldiers required constant training in firing and reloading; the Jacobites lacked time, weapons and ammunition, although Murray reportedly used a simplified but effective form of drill for them. Some of the Lowland regiments, notably Ogilvy's, may have been taught musket drill based on the 1727 British army regulations. Most Jacobite professionals had been trained in France, and infantry drill and tactics showed a French influence: movement in narrow column formation, deployment of reserves in column, and firing in volleys followed by fire a billebaude (at will) as opposed to the rigid 'firings' by platoon used by the British army. The French emphasis on shock tactics, rather than massed firepower, suited the abilities and training levels of the Jacobite troops.

Unit	Colonel	Notes
Cameron of Lochiel's Regiment	Donald Cameron of Lochiel	Lochiel's regiment was drawn from his own tenantry. It formed the bulk of Charles's initial support, although some men were subsequently sent home as they had no weapons. At its greatest strength, it included about 700 men, including recruits raised by Ludovic Cameron of Torcastle while the main army was in England. It suffered heavy losses at Culloden, but was not disbanded until late April or May 1746.
Atholl Brigade	Lord Nairne; Robert Mercer of Aldie †; Archibald Menzies of Shian †	The Atholl Brigade, originally the "Duke of Athole's Regiment", was nominally Tullibardine's unit though was in practice regarded as Lord George Murray's. It was composed of 500 Perthshire men in three battalions. The two first raised were led by Lord Nairne and Lord George Murray (who delegated actual command to Mercer of Aldie), joined by a third after Prestonpans under Menzies of Shian. Raised as a feudal levy rather than as a clan regiment, the Atholl Brigade suffered very high rates of desertion. It took heavy casualties at Culloden, including Aldie and Shian, and dispersed shortly afterwards.
Appin Regiment	Charles Stewart of Ardsheal	The Appin Regiment, mainly tenants of the Stewarts from the Appin area, joined Charles at Invergarry in August. Stewart of Ardsheal was described as 'a big fat man, troubled with a lethargy', unsuited to campaigning; on 3 November 1745, it reported a nominal strength of 260 but was heavily depleted by desertion. It served throughout, including the invasion of England and the battles of Prestonpans, Falkirk and Culloden. Significant numbers of its men had still not surrendered arms by July 1746 and Ardsheal was still dealing with arrears of pay.
MacDonald of Keppoch's Regiment	Alexander MacDonald of Keppoch †	Keppoch brought around 300 men to Glenfinnan from the Lochaber area. He actively served as the regiment's colonel, one of the few clan heads to do so, with close relations as senior officers, though his men developed a reputation for poor discipline. During the campaign the regiment incorporated several smaller units, such as a 120-man 'regiment' led by Alexander MacDonald of Glencoe; present at Highbridge and heavily involved at Prestonpans and Falkirk, Keppoch's Regiment took heavy casualties at Culloden and dispersed.
MacKinnon's Regiment	John Dubh MacKinnon of MacKinnon	Raised by MacKinnon, attainted for his role in 1715, in Skye from his family's tenants: served for most of the Rising attached to Keppoch's regiment. It was later sent north with Cromartie and did not disband until well after Culloden.
MacDonald of Clanranald's Regiment	Ranald MacDonald, younger, of Clanranald	Ranald, the Clanranald chief, refused to publicly support the Rising but permitted his eldest son to raise a regiment. Raised in the Clanranald lands of Moidart and present at Glenfinnan, it was one of only two regiments, along with Glengarry's, to arrive with its own Catholic priest. It fought at Prestonpans, Falkirk and Culloden, after which it dispersed.
MacDonnell of Glengarry's Regiment	Donald MacDonnell of Lochgarry	Glengarry's was one of the largest Highland regiments: it served throughout the Rising, including fighting at Clifton during the retreat from England. Like Clanranald's, it was led by a son of the chief; Aeneas, "young Glengarry", was accidentally shot dead after Falkirk and his kinsman Lochgarry became colonel. It incorporated a smaller 'regiment' led by Coll MacDonnell of Barisdale which effectively served as its second battalion, and a battalion led by Patrick Grant of Glenmoriston. Glengarry's numbered up to 500 at Culloden, exclusive of Barisdale's unit which had been sent into Sutherland, and did not disband until late May 1746.
Lady Mackintosh's Regiment	Alexander MacGillivray of Dunmaglass †	A unit raised in the Inverness area by Lady Anne Farquharson-MacKintosh consisting largely of men from Clan Chattan, many raised through impressment. The 'captain' of the Chattan confederation, Lady Anne's husband Aeneas Mackintosh, was an officer in Government service in the Black Watch and command was given to Alexander MacGillivray. The unit suffered very heavy casualties at Culloden, including most officers, and dispersed immediately afterwards.
Lord Lovat's Regiment	Charles Fraser of Inverallochie †	Raised from among the tenants of Simon Fraser, 11th Lord Lovat: Lovat himself took an equivocal public stance and the regiment was led by others. One battalion of 500 under Inverallochie fought at Culloden; Inverallochie was killed but it was one of the only units of the Jacobite centre to withdraw in good order. The second under the Master of Lovat arrived only after the battle and dispersed shortly afterwards.
Maclachlans' Regiment	Lachlan Maclachlan; † Charles Maclean of Drimnin †	Maclachlan, the Jacobites' Commissary-General, raised a battalion in Argyll and arrived at Holyrood in September, where he was joined by a company under John Maclean of Kingairloch. The battalion was first organised as part of the Atholl Brigade, but in March 1746 was formed into a separate regiment with a newly-raised contingent from Morvern led by Drimnin, who became Lieutenant-Colonel. In this form it fought at Culloden where it suffered heavy casualties.
Chisholm's Battalion	Roderick Og Chisholm †	This small unit, numbering only around 80 Chisholm tenants of Strathglass under the chief's 5th son, joined Charles at Inverness shortly prior to Culloden, at which perhaps 30 of its men were killed.
Manchester Regiment	Francis Towneley	The Manchester Regiment was raised in the town of the same name in late November 1745, numbering around 200 volunteers. Most of the regiment was left as a garrison at Carlisle during the Jacobite retreat to Scotland, surrendering at the end of December. A pioneer company attached to the artillery fought at Culloden.
Royal Ecossais	John Drummond	The Regiment Royal-Ecossais or Royal Scots was raised in France by John Drummond in 1744 from amongst the exile community and from Scots already serving in the Irish Brigade. It landed at Montrose in early December 1745 but attempts to raise a locally recruited second battalion proved unsuccessful. The unit numbered around 350 men by the time of Culloden.
Irish Picquets	Walter Valentine Stapleton †	Also arriving in December 1745, this unit of Irish regulars in French service was commanded by Brigadier Stapleton, an officer of the Regiment Berwick promoted for his bravery at Fontenoy. Each of the six regiments of the Irish Brigade provided a picquet or detachment of 50 men but only those from Dillon, Roth and Lally evaded the Royal Navy.
Regiment Berwick		A separate Franco-Irish unit; one detachment landed at Peterhead in February 1746 and fought with Stapleton at Culloden, while another tasked with escorting French pay was involved in the Skirmish of Tongue.
Lord Lewis Gordon's Regiment	Lord Lewis Gordon	A regiment comprising three largely independent battalions raised in Aberdeenshire and Banffshire. Two battalions were led by James Moir of Stonywood and John Gordon of Avochie; Stonywood's men were mainly volunteers from Aberdeen, whereas most of Avochie's were unwillingly pressed into service as feudal levies. The third was led by Francis Farquharson of Monaltrie, who raised some 300 clansmen shortly prior to the siege of Stirling. The regiment fought at Culloden, with Monaltrie's battalion in the front line.
Lord Ogilvy's Regiment	David, Lord Ogilvy	A large unit of two battalions, raised largely in Forfarshire. Formed in October 1745, the first battalion was commanded by Lord Ogilvy, with a second added in January 1746 under Sir James Kinloch. It withdrew in good order after Culloden and regrouped at Ruthven Barracks before disbanding at Clova on 21 April. Lord Ogilvy (1725-1803) escaped to Sweden and served in the French army before being pardoned and allowed home in 1778.
John Roy Stewart's Regiment	John Roy Stewart	This unit, also known as the 'Edinburgh Regiment', was raised in Edinburgh by Stewart, a professional in the Royal Ecossais. Its complement of urban tradesmen and other volunteers were later joined by British army 'deserters'; one officer who served with it recorded the regiment "had a pretty good reputation". After the march to Derby, the regiment was one of those assigned to the siege of Stirling, and it later fought in the front line at Culloden.
Glenbucket's Regiment	John Gordon of Glenbucket	Raised by Glenbucket early in the rising, partly by impressment, from the Cabrach, Strathdon and Strathbogie and other lands of the Duke of Gordon. It was equipped with weapons taken from Cope's army at Prestonpans, and served throughout the campaign, fighting in the second line at Culloden.
Duke of Perth's Regiment	James Drummond, 3rd Duke of Perth	Built around a nucleus of 200 of Perth's tenants from the Crieff area, this large regiment at various times included Highland, Lowland and English companies, the last of which went to form the basis of the Manchester Regiment, along with 'deserters' recruited after Prestonpans. It temporarily received a second battalion raised in Aberdeen and Banffshire and was 750 strong during the invasion of England; several companies were left at Carlisle. The regiment was not at Falkirk, but 200 men fought at Culloden; as Perth was commanding the Jacobite left it was led by his relative the Master of Strathallan.
MacPherson of Cluny's Regiment	Ewen MacPherson of Cluny	Cluny and his company deserted from Loudon's 64th Highlanders and joined the Jacobite army after Prestonpans: his regiment, raised in the area of Badenoch, fought at Clifton and was possibly 400 strong by the time of Falkirk. It was still en route to joining the main army when Culloden was fought, surrendering on 17 May.
Earl of Cromartie's Regiment	George Mackenzie, Earl of Cromartie	Raised in the northern Highlands by Cromartie, partly through impressment. Was mostly composed of Mackenzies and MacRaes. Ambushed and destroyed on 15 April 1746 at Embo by militia.
Kilmarnock's Foot Guards	William Boyd, Earl of Kilmarnock	Kilmarnock had originally raised a troop of cavalry, but when in early 1746 its horses were requisitioned for use by Fitzjames', it was converted into a foot regiment. It was then expanded using impressed men from Aberdeenshire and by absorbing a number of smaller units such as James Crichton of Auchingoul's.
Crichton of Auchingoul's Regiment	James Crichton of Auchingoul	A small unit raised in Aberdeen and Oldmeldrum in late 1745 by Crichton, a Catholic whose family had backed the Stuarts in 1688 and 1715. The regiment, described as "very unruly" in a note in the kirk session record of Essil, was merged into Kilmarnock's Foot Guards prior to Culloden.
Bannerman of Elsick's Regiment	Sir James Bannerman	Another Aberdeenshire regiment, raised in Stonehaven; probably merged into Kilmarnock's regiment late in the campaign.

=== Cavalry ===
The Penicuik artist's depiction of one of the "Scotch Hussars"

The Jacobite Army's cavalry units were small in number and mostly restricted to scouting and other duties typically carried out by light cavalry. Despite this, the units that were raised arguably performed better in these roles during the rebellion than the government cavalry opposing them. All Jacobite cavalry regiments with one exception comprised two troops and contained a disproportionate number of officers to an even greater degree than their infantry counterparts as commissions were used to reward Jacobite supporters.

Unit	Colonel	Notes
Lifeguards	David Wemyss, Lord Elcho; Arthur Elphinstone, 6th Lord Balmerino	Charles had a mounted lifeguard from early on in the campaign; it eventually grew to be one of the larger cavalry units. Most of the recruits were young men drawn from the 'society' of Dundee and Edinburgh, with many being sons of gentlemen. One troop, of around 100 men, was commanded by Lord Elcho, and another of 40 men by Balmerino. Unlike nearly all Jacobite units, the Lifeguards had an elaborate formal uniform: blue coats with red facings, laced waistcoats and a tartan carbine belt.
Scotch Hussars	John Murray of Broughton	A single troop of 50 men raised in Edinburgh by John Murray of Broughton and officered by a group of Lothian gentry. It is unclear why they were designated as hussars, a role until then unknown in Britain; their clothing included a fur-trimmed hussar cap of obsolete French pattern. As Murray of Broughton served on Charles' staff, the Hussars were led by Captain George Hamilton of Redhouse until his capture at Clifton, and then by an Irish professional, Major John Bagot of the French Regiment Roth. Bagot recognised that the unit would be ineffective in open battle and instead trained them to operate as light cavalry in the continental manner.
Strathallan's Horse	William Drummond, 4th Viscount Strathallan †	Also known as the Perthshire Horse, this regiment was raised early in the rebellion by 4th Viscount Strathallan and Laurence Oliphant of Gask. Many of the volunteers were small landowners, along with a number of tradesmen. They served throughout the Rising; Strathallan eventually led them and himself to destruction at Culloden in an attempt to hold back the government advance.
Lord Kilmarnock's Horse	Lord Kilmarnock	Also known as the "Horse Grenadiers", this small unit was raised in West Lothian and Fife and generally brigaded with Strathallan's Horse. It served as cavalry until March 1746, at which point its 42 remaining men gave up their horses to the newly arrived professionals of Fitzjames Cavallerie and were reorganised as Kilmarnock's regiment of Foot Guards.
Pitsligo's Horse	Alexander Forbes, 4th Lord Forbes of Pitsligo	Pitsligo, designated Jacobite 'General of Horse', raised a cavalry regiment in Aberdeenshire early in the Rising; it included around 130 men. Along with Kilmarnock's regiment, its remaining horses were given to Fitzjames Cavallerie in March and its men transferred either to the Foot Guards or to Stonywood's battalion of Lewis Gordon's regiment.
Fitzjames Cavallerie	William Bagot	A unit nominally of Irish exiles in French service, but in reality including a number of Englishmen. The majority were captured at sea and only one squadron landed at Aberdeen in 1746, minus its horses. Half of the unit, led by Captain William Bagot, was mounted at the expense of Kilmarnock and Pitsligo's cavalry; the rest fought on foot with the Irish Picquets.

=== Artillery ===
As with the cavalry, the Jacobite artillery was small and under-resourced, but was better organised than traditionally depicted. For most of the campaign it was led by a French regular, Captain James Grant of the Regiment Lally. Grant arrived in October 1745 along with 12 French gunners, who were intended to train new recruits. At Edinburgh, he organised two companies of Perth's regiment as gunners, and later drafted a group from the Manchester Regiment as a pioneer company.

The army was always short of heavy weapons, but during the invasion of England an artillery train was formed using six elderly guns captured from Cope at Prestonpans, six modern four-pounders captured at Fontenoy and shipped to Scotland by the French, and an obsolete 16th century brass cannon from Blair Atholl. Several of these guns and one company were left at Carlisle under Captain John Burnet of Campfield, a former British artillery regular.

Several larger siege guns were landed at Montrose in November, along with a number of three-pounders taken at Fontenoy. At Stirling, Grant was absent due to a wound received at Fort William: the siege artillery was placed under the command of a Franco-Scottish engineer Loüis-Antoine-Alexandre-François de Gordon, usually known by the possible nom-de-guerre of the 'Marquis de Mirabelle'. The abilities of "Mr. Admirable", as he was derisively called by the Scots, were not well-regarded and the artillery's placement and performance at Stirling were so poor it was suspected he had been bribed. Most of the siege artillery was abandoned when the Jacobites retreated.

At Fort Augustus in March the artillery had some success; a French engineer mortared the fort's magazine, forcing its surrender. Grant was still absent at Culloden, however, where the Jacobite field artillery was commanded by John Finlayson. It was quickly overwhelmed, despite the efforts of a French regular, Capt. du Saussay, to bring up a further gun towards the close of the battle.

== Equipment ==
The Penicuik artist's depiction of a Jacobite officer: The use of the broadsword and targe, a style of weaponry first popular in 16th century Spain, was limited largely to officers in Highland regiments.

Traditional depictions of the Jacobite army often showed men dressed in Highland fashion and armed with broadswords and targes, weaponry essentially unchanged since the 17th century. Such imagery suited both Government propaganda and the heroic traditions of Gaelic verse but was fundamentally exaggerated. While tacksmen and urban volunteers from the professions might carry a backsword, or a broadsword if they were officers, in reality it appears that most men carried firelocks, and were drilled in accordance with up to date military practises.

At the start many of the Highland levies were poorly armed: one Edinburgh resident reported that the Jacobites carried a mixture of antiquated guns, agricultural tools like pitchforks and scythes and a few Lochaber axes and swords. Many officers and cavalrymen had pistols of local manufacture, the trade being centred in Doune. At the start of the Rising Charles managed to procure a shipment of broadswords made cheaply in Germany (famously carrying the inscription "Prosperity to Schotland and no Union") and 2,000 targes. However, following the victory at Prestonpans and subsequent shipments of French and Spanish pattern 17.5 mm muskets into Montrose and Stonehaven, the army had access to modern firelocks fitted with bayonets, which formed the main weaponry of the rank and file. The men appear to have regarded the targes as an encumbrance and threw most of them away prior to Culloden.

Many Jacobites, even Highlanders as depicted here by the Penicuik artist, would have used a firelock and bayonet as their main weapon.

Despite this, Jacobite officers recognised the psychological value of the "Highland charge" against inexperienced troops, particularly as the broadsword inflicted wounds that were spectacular, if far less damaging than bullet wounds. Lord George noted their reputation was such that at Penrith, Glengarry's regiment merely had to "throw their plaids" for a group of local militia to "[make] off at the top gallop". Infantry tactics were strongly predicated on exploiting this effect to make the opposition break and run: eyewitness Andrew Henderson noted the Jacobites "making a dreadful huzza, and even crying 'Run, ye dogs'" as they closed with Barrell's regiment at Culloden.

The tactic was less successful when opposing troops held their ground, particularly as it was customary to fire a single shot at close range, then drop the firearm and charge home with the sword. Once their charge was held up at Culloden, the Highlanders were reduced to throwing stones at the government troops, unable to respond in any other way.

As an insurgent army, the Jacobites did not have a formal uniform and most men initially wore the clothes they joined in, whether the coat and breeches of the Lowlands or the short coat and plaid of the Highlands. Notable exceptions were Charles's Lifeguard, who were issued with blue coats faced with scarlet, as were the Royal Ecossais; the Irish Brigade, as the lineal descendant of James II's Royal Irish Army, wore their traditional red coats. The well-dressed cavalry were used in an attempt to impress the local populace in several places: an observer at Derby said that they were "likely young men" who "made a fine show", whereas the infantry "appeared more like a parcel of chimney sweeps".

As a basic sign of Stuart allegiance all men wore a white cockade and many wore, or were issued with, the characteristic knitted and felted blue bonnet, including the Royal Ecossais. There was frequent use of various forms of saltire as a badge, including on regimental standards. As the rebellion went on, however, there is evidence that the Jacobite leadership began to use clothing made up of tartan cloth as a simple form of uniform irrespective of the origin of the troops wearing it. Tartan cloth was readily available in quantity, served to distinctively identify the Jacobites, and was exploited by the rebels both as a symbol of Stuart loyalty and, increasingly, of Scottish identity. An intelligence report sent to the Duke of Atholl, however, reached the conclusion that the Jacobites were primarily "puting now many of the Lowlanders in highland dress, to make the number of Highlanders appear more".

== Pay ==
Accounts maintained by Lawrence Oliphant of Gask, who was deputy commander under Strathallan at Perth, show that a fixed scale of pay was maintained until relatively late in the campaign. Private soldiers were paid 6d. per day, while sergeants received 9d.; officers' pay ranged from ensigns at 1s.6d. per day to colonels at 6s. There was however little consistency in how individual regiments were paid by their colonels and men were paid at intervals ranging from one to 21 days: although generally paid in advance some companies received theirs in arrears.

From February 1746 pay rates went into a decline, in addition to falling into arrears. The narratives of James Maxwell of Kirkconnell and of Murray suggest that by March money had run out completely, and that men were instead paid weekly in oatmeal.

== Statistics ==
A detailed examination of available records concluded that the maximum operational force available to the Jacobites was about 9,000 men, with the total recruitment during the campaign possibly reaching as high as 13,140 exclusive of Franco-Irish reinforcements. The gap between two figures could be explained by desertion, although it also seems probable that many enlistment figures were based on over-optimistic reports by Jacobite agents.

The vast majority of battlefield casualties during the campaign - around 1,500 - occurred at Culloden. Although many Jacobites went into hiding or simply returned home after dismissal, a total of 3,471 men were recorded as prisoners after the rebellion, though this figure probably includes some double counting, French POWs, and civilians. From these there were around 40 summary executions of 'deserters' and 73 executions after trial; 936 were sentenced to or volunteered for transportation; and 7-800 were drafted into the ranks of the British Army, often for service in the colonies. The remainder, with the exception of a few senior officers still at large, were pardoned by a 1747 Act of Indemnity.

== Sources ==
- Annand, A Mck (1994). "Lord Kilmarnock's Horse Grenadiers (Later Foot Guards), in the Army of Prince Charles Edward, 1745-6". Journal of the Society for Army Historical Research. 72 (290).
- Charles, George (1817). History of the transactions in Scotland, in the years 1715-16 & 1745-1746; Volume II. Gilchrist & Heriot.
- Duffy, Christopher (2003). The '45: Bonnie Prince Charlie and the Untold Story of the Jacobite Rising. Orion. ISBN 978-0304355259.
- Elcho, David (2010) [1748]. A Short Account of the Affairs of Scotland in the Years 1744–46. Kessinger Publishing. ISBN 978-1163535240.
- Grant, Charles (1950). "Glenbucket's Regiment of Foot". Journal of the Society for Army Historical Research. 28 (113).
- Houlding, John Alan (1978). The Training of the British Army 1715-1795. King's College London PHD.
- Layne, Daren Scott (2015). The Popular Constituency of the Jacobite Rising in 1745-6. University of St Andrews.
- Lenman, Bruce (1980). The Jacobite Risings in Britain 1689–1746. Methuen Publishing. ISBN 978-0413396501.
- Mackillop, Andrew (1995). Military Recruiting in the Scottish Highlands 1739–1815: the Political, Social and Economic Context. PHD Thesis University of Glasgow. OCLC 59608677.
- Mitchison, Rosalind (1983). Lordship to Patronage: Scotland, 1603-1745 (New History of Scotland) (1990 ed.). Edinburgh University Press. ISBN 978-0748602339.
- Oates, Jonathan, ed. (2006). The Memoir of Walter Shairp; the Story of the Liverpool Regiment during the Jacobite Rising of 1745 in Volume CXLII;. The Record Society of Lancashire and Cheshire. ISBN 978-0-902593-73-2.
- Riding, Jacqueline (2016). Jacobites: A New History of the 45 Rebellion. Bloomsbury. ISBN 978-1408819128.
- Tomasson, Katherine, Buist, Francis (1978). Battles of the Forty-five. HarperCollins Distribution Services. ISBN 978-0713407693.
- Yates, Nigel (2017). Eighteenth-century Britain: Religion and Politics, 1715-1815. Routledge. ISBN 978-1138154346.
