= Lewis Gordon (Jacobite) =

Scottish nobleman, naval officer and Jacobite

Lord Lewis Gordon
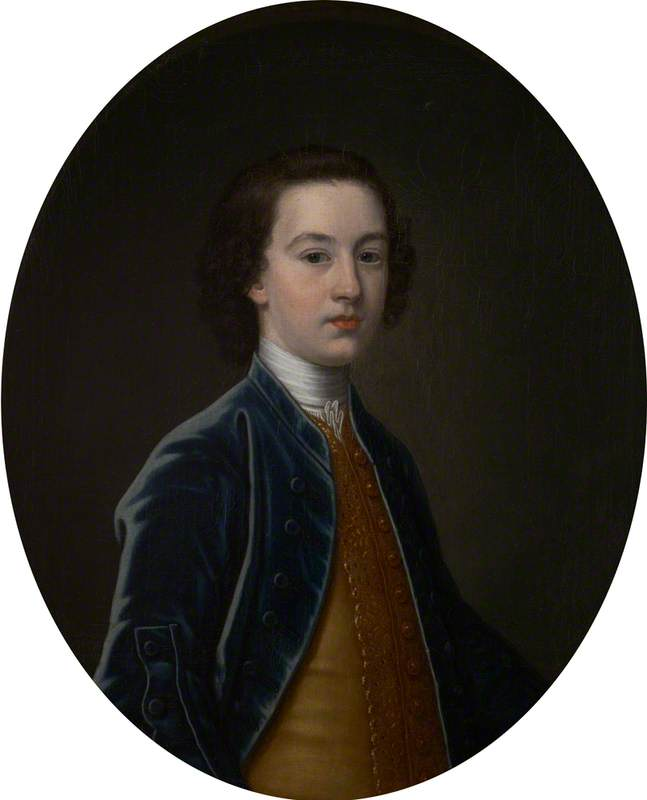
- Lewis Gordon, aged 13, by John Alexander
- Born: 1724; Huntly, Aberdeenshire
- Died: 15 June 1754 (aged 29–30); Montreuil, Seine-Saint-Denis
- Military career
- Allegiance: Great Britain (c.1744–5); Jacobites (1745–54)
- Rank: Lieutenant (British); Colonel (Jacobite)
- Unit: Lord Lewis Gordon's Regiment
- Conflicts: Jacobite Rising of 1745

Lord Lewis Gordon (22 December 1724 – 15 June 1754), also known as Lord Ludovick Gordon, was a Scottish nobleman, naval officer and Jacobite, remembered largely for participating in the Jacobite rising of 1745, during which Charles Edward Stuart appointed him Lord-lieutenant of Aberdeenshire and Banffshire.

During the rising Gordon and his agents raised a large number of men, often through impressment, from the estates of his brother the Duke of Gordon: the north-eastern counties ultimately provided up to a quarter of the Jacobite army's rank and file. After the failure of the campaign he escaped to France, dying at Montreuil in 1754.

== Life ==
Gordon was the fourth son of Alexander Gordon, 2nd Duke of Gordon, and Lady Henrietta Mordaunt, daughter of Charles Mordaunt, 3rd Earl of Peterborough. As a younger son, he used 'Lord' as a courtesy title. His father, as Marquis of Huntly, had fought on the Jacobite side in the 1715 rising, but later obtained a government pardon.

Taking service in the Royal Navy, he was commissioned Lieutenant in 1744, serving on HMS Dunkirk.

== 1745 Rising ==
Gordon was serving with the Mediterranean Fleet when he abruptly deserted his post in May 1745; this coincided with Charles Stuart putting in motion his plans for a Scottish rising. Gordon made his way to Scotland and on 16 October 1745 swore allegiance to Charles at Holyrood.

The anonymous contemporary author of Memoirs of the Rebellion in Aberdeen and Banff, probably Rev. John Bissett, commented that Gordon "met so many old friends and acquaintances engaged in the rebellion, who all laid oars in the water to gain him; and this indeed was no hard matter to a forward young lad like him, especially as he was to have a Feather in his cap, and to be made Lord Lieutenant of Aberdeenshire and Governor of the towns of Aberdeen and Banff". However, his Jacobite adherence may at least in part have been as proxy for his brother Cosmo George Gordon, 3rd Duke of Gordon, one of the largest landowners in Scotland; several leading families took similar actions during the 1745 rising in order to maintain influence with both sides. Gordon's widowed mother was certainly aware of his plans to join Charles, and gave her approval. His brother the Duke claimed to be indisposed by illness, and did not issue an order expressly forbidding his tenants to join the rebellion until November.

=== Lord Lewis Gordon's Regiment ===
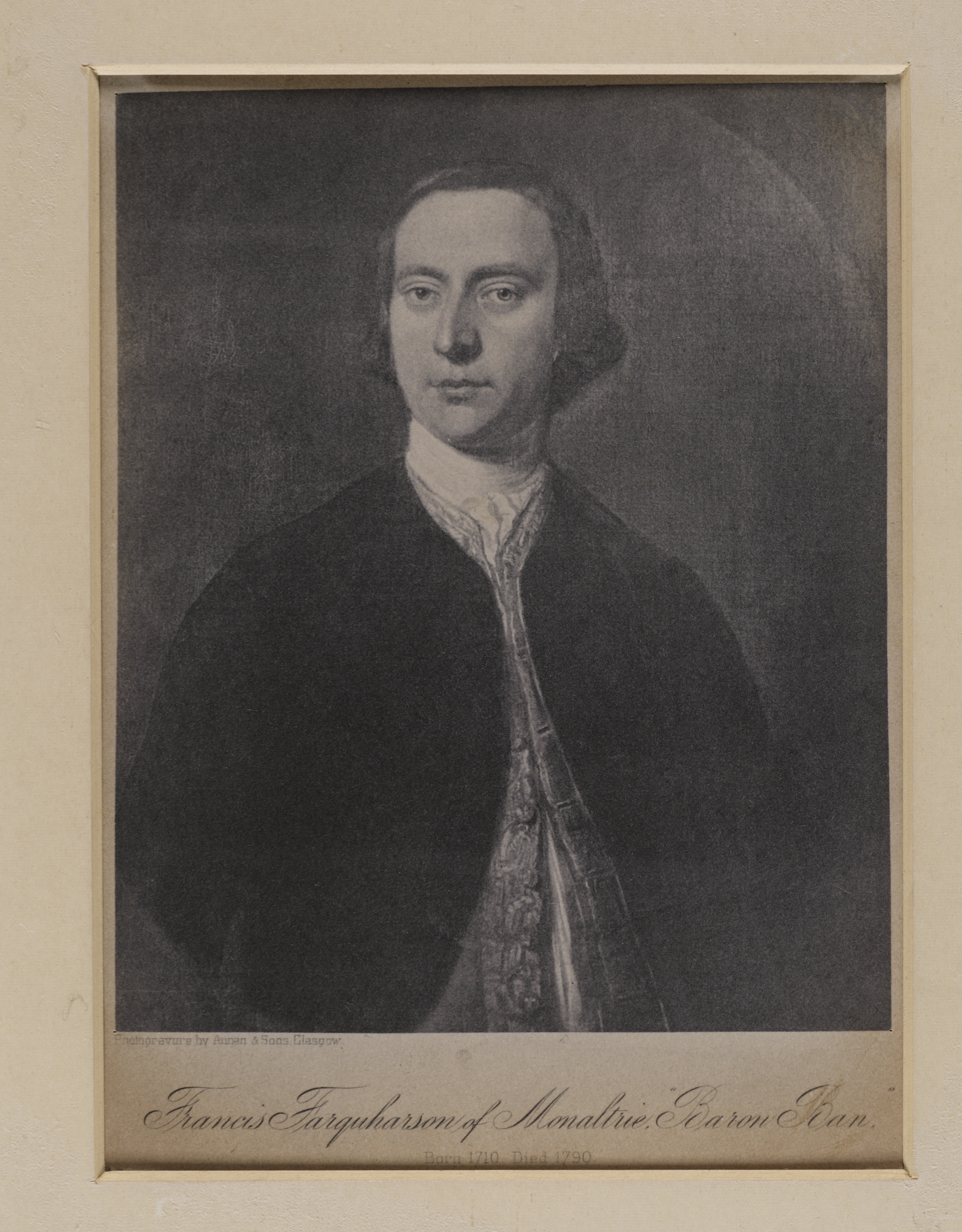
Francis Farquharson of Monaltrie; described by a contemporary as "a gentleman of no great estate, Nephew and Factor to the Laird of Invercauld", he raised the 'Mar' battalion of Gordon's regiment.

Charles made Gordon a member of his 'Council of War' before sending him north to raise men from the Gordon family estates. Tenants in this area of Scotland still held their land under the feudal obligation of vassalage, which included an expectation of military service on demand. Gordon was an effective recruiter, though his methods have been characterised as "drastic": Alexander MacDonald, then with the Jacobite army in Musselburgh, wrote to his father in October 1745 that Gordon was "putting in to prisson [sic] all who are not willing to Rise." He briefly experimented with quartering Highlanders on those who refused, but then moved on to threats of burning property; Bissett noted that the firing of one house in a district "soon had the desired effect".

Further conscription was handled by the Duke of Gordon's factors or tacksmen, who often used similar methods. Early in the rising John Gordon of Glenbucket raised a regiment by impressment of Gordon tenants in Banffshire and western Aberdeenshire. An additional unit known as the 'Enzie' battalion was raised by John Hamilton of Sandistoun, the Duke of Gordon's factor in the Huntly area, and another of the Duke's wealthier tenants, David Tulloch of Dunbennan; it joined the main army at Edinburgh on 4 October.

The bulk of Lord Lewis Gordon's own regiment was raised in three battalions: the 'Aberdeen' battalion, mainly volunteers from Aberdeen itself led by James Moir of Stonywood; the 'Strathbogie' battalion, unwilling feudal levies under John Gordon of Avochie; and the 'Mar' battalion, mostly Highlanders raised by Francis Farquharson of Monaltrie in Braemar and upper Deeside. Gordon's regiment ultimately became one of the largest in the Jacobite army with a complement of over 800 men.

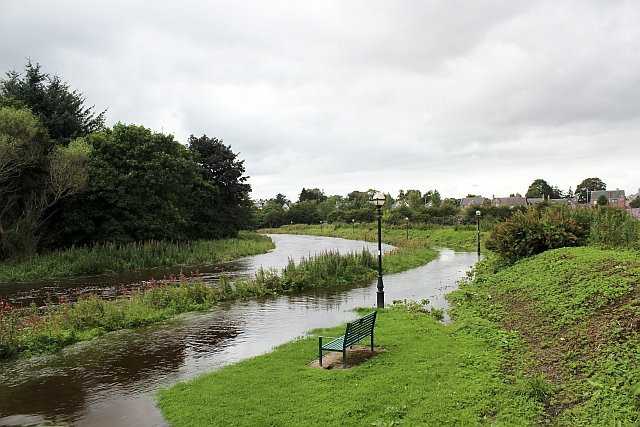
The Don at Inverurie; a party of Gordon's troops forded the river to attack the flank of a government force during the Battle of Inverurie.

With his regiment up to strength, Gordon organised the defence of Aberdeen before moving against the government's Independent Highland Companies under the Lord Macleod. He nominally led one column of Jacobite troops and Avochie another, though in reality it appears that active command was delegated to Major Cuthbert, brother of the laird of Castlehill and a regular in the French Royal-Ecossais, who "did all the business".

Cuthbert and Gordon scattered MacLeod's force at the Battle of Inverurie on 23 December 1745. Linking up with Lord John Drummond, Gordon marched to Perth and joined the main army of the insurgents. His regiment was present at Falkirk in January, where the Jacobites won a confused tactical victory against Hawley's government army.

At the Battle of Culloden in April 1746 Gordon's regiment was positioned with the Jacobite reserve; along with the Franco-Irish troopers of Fitzjames' Horse it helped repel an attempt to encircle the Jacobite right, taking heavy casualties in the process. After the Jacobite defeat the regiment withdrew in good order under Avochie to Ruthven Barracks before dispersing. Lewis Gordon was supposed to have hidden at Balbithan House for several months before taking a ship at Peterhead and escaping to France.

== After 1745 ==
Gordon's name was included in the Act of Attainder passed after the rebellion by the government. In 1747 the French envoy d’Éguilles submitted a 'memorandum' or report on the 1745 rising to the French government, including an assessment of its leaders: he was sharply critical of most other than Lochiel and his brother, but allowed that Lewis Gordon was "full of courage and ambition".

In 1749 he was one of six prominent Scots appointed to a commission sitting in Paris to examine the claims of Scottish refugees to financial assistance from King Louis XV; the same year a French government memo recorded that Gordon was barely on speaking terms with Charles, suffered from attacks of vertigo, and was "often disturbed". A British report of 1752 identified him as one of a number of Jacobite exiles who had recently been in Scotland undetected.

He is said to have "exhibited symptoms of insanity, and to have mutilated himself" before his death in France on 15 June 1754. One source suggests he left a wife and daughter, but nothing further is known of them.

His name was remembered in Scotland in a popular Jacobite air, "Lewie Gordon"; James Hogg identified its author as the Catholic theologian Alexander Geddes (1737–1802).
