= Walter Stapleton (soldier) =

- Born: unknown Ireland
- Died: 1746; Culloden, Scotland
- Military career
- Allegiance: France; Jacobites
- Rank: Colonel
- Unit: Irish Brigade
- Commands: Irish Picquets
- Conflicts: War of Austrian Succession; Battle of Fontenoy; Jacobite rising; Battle of Falkirk Muir; Siege of Fort Augustus; Battle of Culloden

Walter Valentine Stapleton (died 1746), was an Irish soldier who served in the French army during the War of Austrian Succession and was sent to Scotland shortly afterwards to fight in the Jacobite rising of 1745 where he commanded the Irish Picquet regiment and died from severe wounds after the Battle of Culloden.
