= Siege of Fort Augustus (1746) =

1746 siege

- Part of the Jacobite rising of 1745
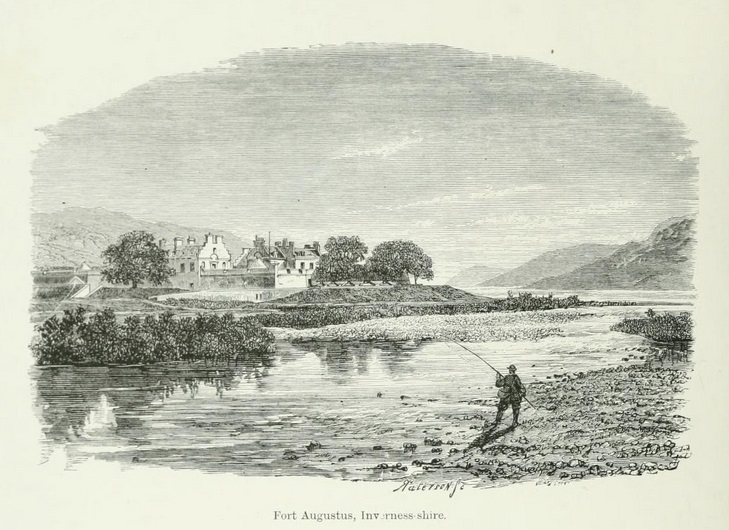
- Fort Augustus
Date	22 February to 1 March 1746
Location	Fort Augustus, Scottish Highlands
Result	Jacobite/French victory

Belligerents
Kingdom of Great Britain	Jacobites; Kingdom of France

Commanders and leaders
(Kingdom of Great Britain) Major Hugh Wentworth	(Kingdom of France) Colonel Walter Stapleton (Kingdom of France) Colonel James Grant

Strength
300 (estimated)	1,500–1,800 (estimated)

Casualties and losses
None	None

The Siege of Fort Augustus took place from 22 February to 1 March 1746, during the Jacobite rising of 1745. After a short siege, the government garrison surrendered to a Jacobite force, which then moved on to besiege Fort William, using artillery captured at Fort Augustus.

== Background ==
After the 1715 rising, a line of forts was built along what is now the Caledonian Canal: the three most important were Fort George, Inverness; Fort Augustus; and Fort William. Their garrisons were reinforced when the 1745 rising began, but the defences had been neglected and were in a poor state. However, it was not until the Jacobites retreated from Stirling Castle in February 1746 that a serious effort was made to capture them.

Despite being well-supplied, Fort George surrendered without fighting; its governor, Major Grant, a close relative of the Jacobite Lord Lovat, was later court-martialled and dismissed. The garrisons at Fort Augustus and Fort William had been raiding the surrounding countryside, much of which belonged to Lochiel and MacDonald of Keppoch. To protect their lands, they demanded that the forts be taken; on 21 February, a contingent of Irish regulars in the French Army under Colonel Walter Stapleton and 1,500 Cameron and MacDonald clansmen arrived outside Fort Augustus.

== Siege ==
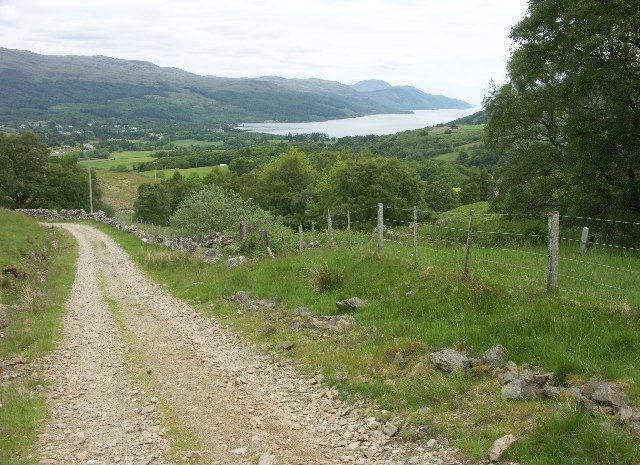
Fort Augustus and Loch Ness, from military road (foreground)

Fort Augustus is at the southwest end of Loch Ness, at a key junction of the military roads constructed after 1715; built-in 1729, the fort replaced a barracks known as Kilwhimen Barracks. Instead of being built on high ground, it was placed on a peninsula surrounded by Loch Ness and the Rivers Oich and Tarff. Cumberland felt it could not be defended for more than a few days, and wrote that Fort William was the only one of any importance.

Square in plan with angled bastions on each corner, the fort was designed "more ... for ornament than strength" as a demonstration of the government's presence in the Scottish Highlands. The walls were weak, while the six-pounder guns that provided defensive fire were installed on top of the four bastions, in full view of an attacking force. The garrison consisted of three companies from Guise's Regiment, commanded by Major Hugh Wentworth. He lacked trained gunners and stationed one of his companies in the old Kiliwhimen Barracks, an isolated position to the south of the fort. This was quickly taken by the French regulars under Stapleton, and his engineer Grant began siege operations on 22 February 1746.

According to an eyewitness, the Jacobites had three batteries, one opposite the main gate and two firing from the north. These had little effect, with most of the damage being done by three coehorn mortars; on the first day, a shell from one of these blew up the fort's magazine, destroying one of its bastions. A second shot caused the explosion of another magazine the next day, but the firing then continued for another four days without further impact. The garrison capitulated on 1 March without any casualties, and Wentworth was considered to have surrendered too early; he was subsequently court-martialled and dismissed from the army.

== Aftermath ==
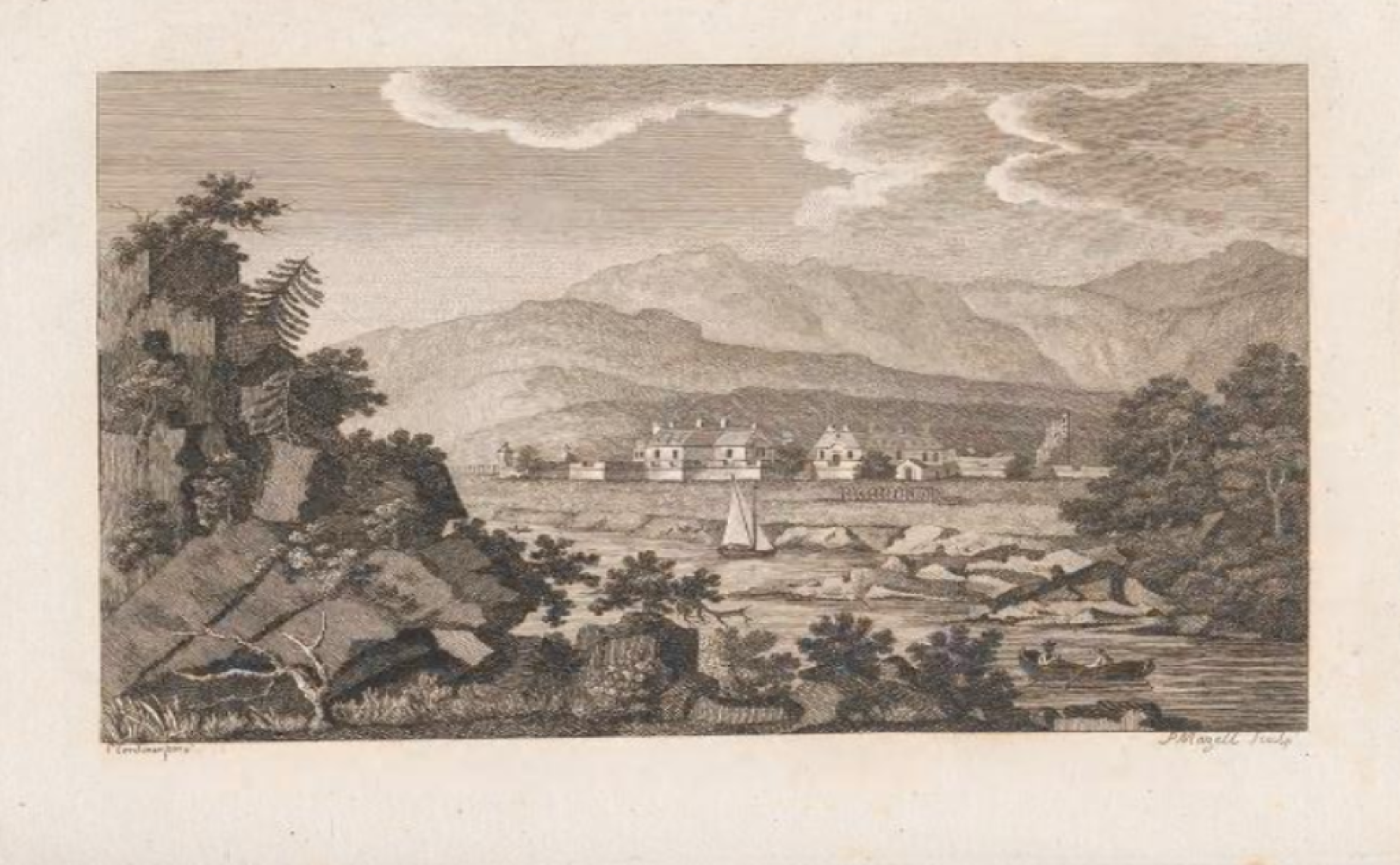
Another drawing of the old fort c.1788

The Jacobites moved on to Fort William, the last government strong point along the Great Glen, a much stronger facility. The siege of Fort William was abandoned in early April.

== Sources ==
- Clark, GN (1922). "The Highland Forts in the 45" (PDF). The English Historical Review. 37.
- Duffy, Christopher (2007). The '45, Bonnie Prince Charlie and Untold Story of the Jacobite Rising. p. 452. ISBN 978-0-7538-2262-3.
