= Battle of Culloden =

1746 battle of the Jacobite rising of 1745

- Part of the Jacobite rising of 1745
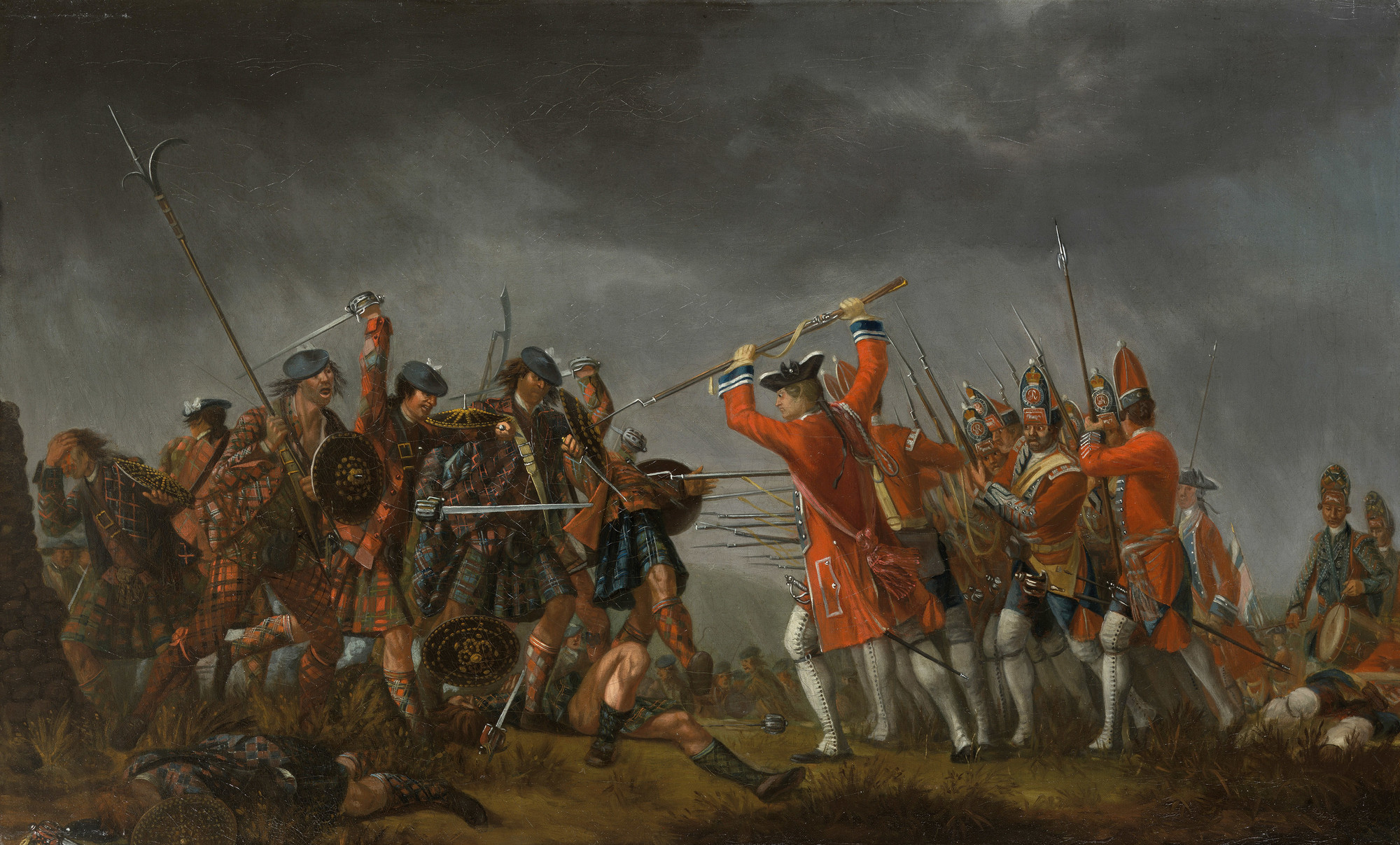
- An Incident in the Rebellion of 1745, David Morier
Date	16 April 1746
Location	Culloden, Scotland 57°28′38″N 04°05′33″W
Result	Government victory

Belligerents
(Kingdom of Great Britain) British Government	Jacobites

Commanders and leaders
Duke of Cumberland; Earl of Albemarle; John Huske; John Mordaunt; Henry Hawley	Charles Edward Stuart; George Murray; Donald Cameron; John O'Sullivan; John Drummond; James Drummond

Strength
6,900–7,200	5,000–6,000

Casualties and losses
c. 50 killed, 259 wounded	1,500–2,000 killed and wounded 376 captured

Registered battlefield
- Designated: 21 March 2011
- Reference no.: BTL6
- Location within Scotland Battle of Culloden (the United Kingdom)

The Battle of Culloden (Note: /kəˈlɒdən/;Scottish Gaelic: Blàr Chùil Lodair) took place on 16 April 1746, near Inverness, in the Scottish Highlands. A Jacobite army under Charles Edward Stuart was decisively defeated by a British government force commanded by the Duke of Cumberland, thereby ending the Jacobite rising of 1745.

Charles landed in Scotland in July 1745, seeking to restore his father James Francis Edward Stuart to the British throne. He quickly won control of large parts of Scotland, and an invasion of England reached as far south as Derby before being forced to turn back. However by April 1746 the Jacobites were short of supplies, facing a superior and better-equipped opponent.

The Jacobite commanders decided their only option was to stand and fight. When the two armies met at Culloden, the battle was brief, lasting less than an hour, with the Jacobites suffering an overwhelming and bloody defeat. This effectively ended both the 1745 rising and Jacobitism as a significant element in British politics.

== Background ==
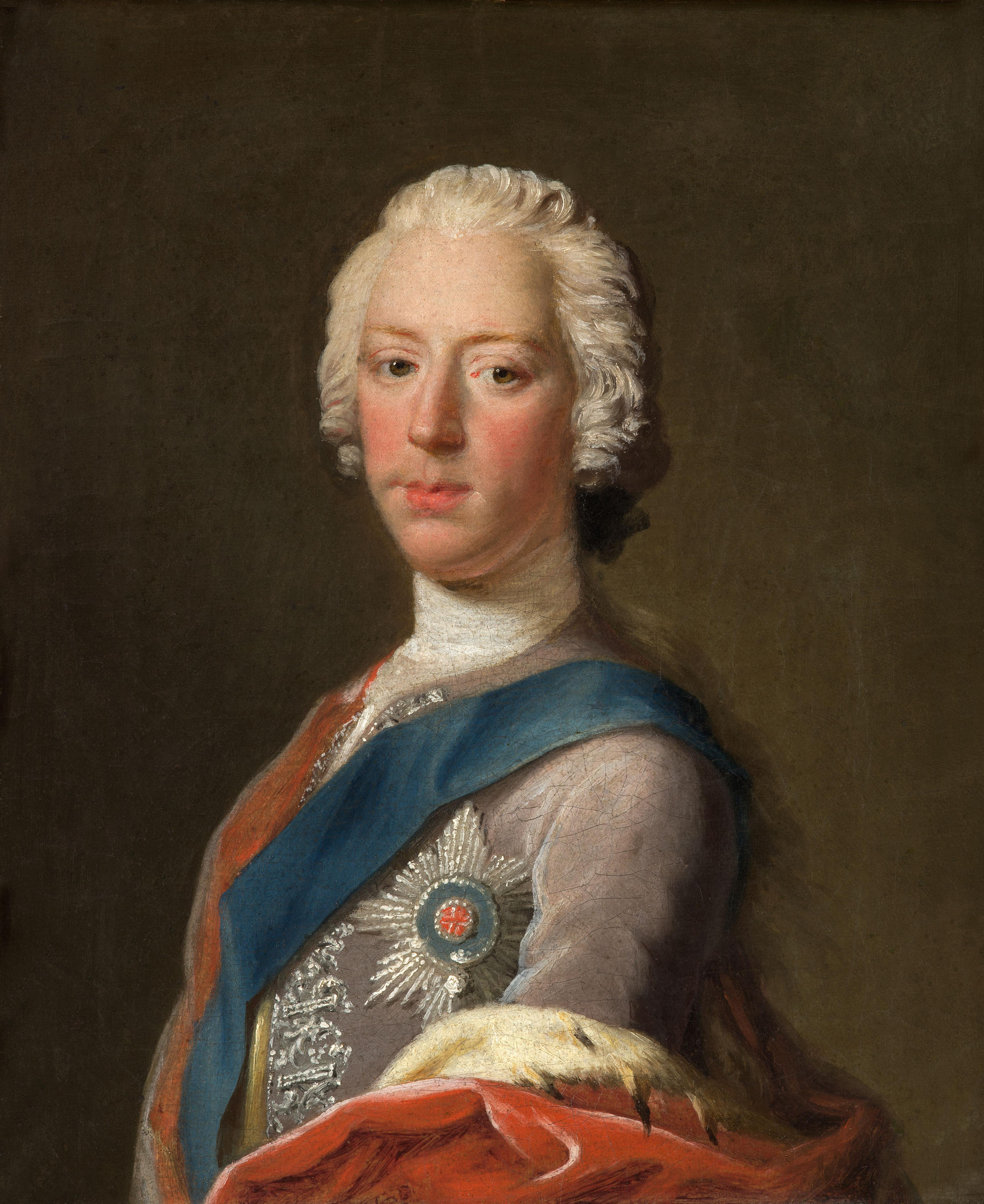
Charles Edward Stuart, painted late 1745. (Original displayed at Scottish National Portrait Gallery)

The Jacobite rising of 1745 began on 23 July when Charles Edward Stuart landed in the Western Isles and launched an attempt to reclaim the British throne for the exiled House of Stuart. After their victory at Prestonpans in September, the Jacobites controlled much of Scotland, and Charles persuaded his colleagues to invade England. The Jacobite army reached Derby before successfully retreating across the border.

Despite its lack of tangible results, the invasion boosted recruitment, bringing Jacobite strength to more than 8,000. These troops, along with French-supplied artillery, were used to besiege Stirling Castle, the strategic key to the Scottish Highlands. On 17 January the Jacobites repulsed a government relief force under Henry Hawley at the Battle of Falkirk Muir, although the siege itself made little progress.

Soon after, Cumberland arrived in Edinburgh to take over command from Hawley. On 1 February, the Jacobite army abandoned the siege and withdrew to Inverness. Cumberland's army entered Aberdeen on 27 February and both sides halted operations until the weather improved. Although several French shipments were received during the winter, the Royal Navy blockade left the Jacobites short of money and food. When Cumberland resumed the campaign on 8 April, Charles and his advisers agreed their best option was to gamble on a set-piece battle.

== Prelude ==
On 12 April, Cumberland's army forded the River Spey, which was guarded by 2,000 Jacobites under Lord John Drummond, who withdrew towards Nairn, an action for which he was later criticised. The Jacobites evacuated the town on 14 April, and Cumberland's troops camped just to the west. Although significant elements were absent elsewhere, the main Jacobite army of about 5,400 left Inverness on 15 April and assembled on the Culloden estate, five miles (eight kilometres) to the east.

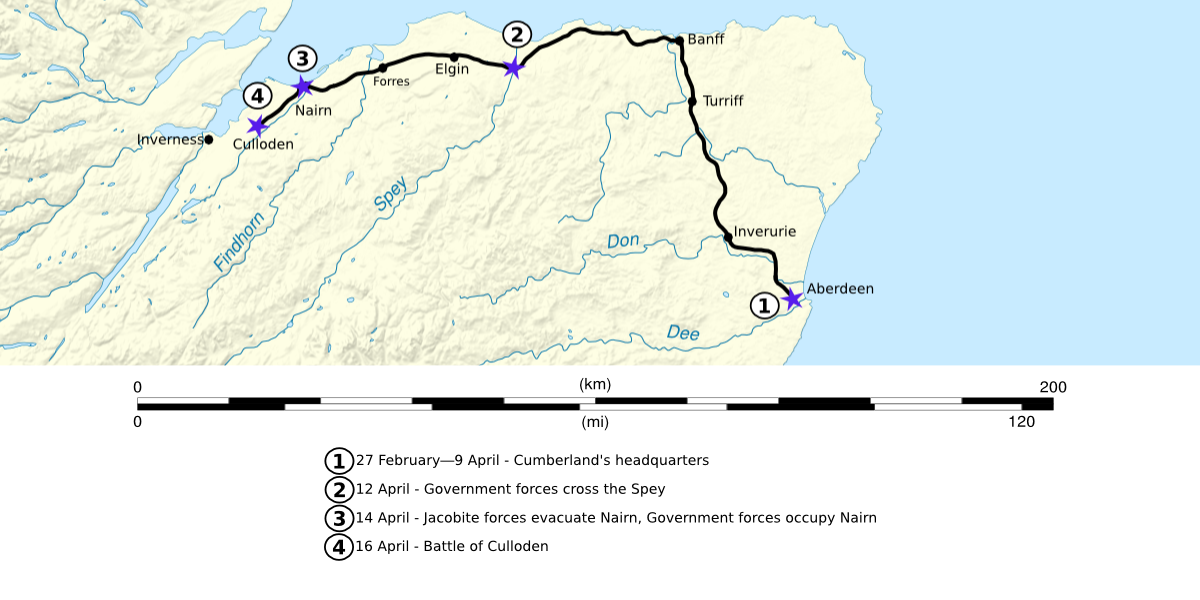
Cumberland's march from Aberdeen to Culloden

The Jacobite command ultimately decided abandoning Inverness, which held most of their dwindling supplies, meant the army might disintegrate. Sir John O'Sullivan, the adjutant-general, identified a suitable site for a defensive action at Drummossie Moor, but Lord George Murray felt it favoured the government troops. He suggested an alternative, steeply sloping site near Daviot Castle, which was inspected by Brigadier Stapleton of the Irish Brigade and Colonel Ker on the morning of 15 April. They rejected Murray's suggestion, arguing the ground was "mossy and soft" and would fail to protect the road into Inverness. The Jacobites ultimately formed their line west of the site originally chosen by O'Sullivan.

=== Night attack at Nairn ===
On 15 April the government army celebrated Cumberland's 25th birthday by issuing two imperial gallons (nine litres) of brandy to each regiment. Hoping they would be less vigilant as a result, the Jacobite leaders decided to conduct a night attack on the government encampment. Murray's instructions were for his troops to use only swords, dirks and bayonets, to overturn tents and subsequently to locate "a swelling or bulge in the fallen tent, there to strike and push vigorously". (Note: A Highland Jacobite officer wrote: "We were likewise forbid in the attack to make use of firearms, but only of sword, dirk and bayonet, to cutt the tent strings, and pull down the poles, and where observed a swelling or bulge in the falen tent, there to strick and push vigorously".)

The plan drawn up by Murray called for simultaneous attacks on Cumberland's front and rear by his troops and a second force under the Duke of Perth, supported by Lord John Drummond and Prince Charles. The Jacobite force did not begin its march until well after dark, partly to avoid being spotted by ships of the Royal Navy then in the Moray Firth. Murray led it across country to avoid government outposts, but one participant, James Johnson, later wrote "this march...on a dark night [was] accompanied with confusion and disorder".

As a result, it was one hour before dawn when Murray's leading elements reached Culraick, still two miles (three kilometres) from the intended crossing point over the River Nairn. After a heated debate, Murray concluded the attack should be aborted, but this message was not communicated to the 1,200 men under Perth. While Murray led his detachment back to camp along the Inverness road, Perth continued, unaware of the change in plan. One account claims his troops made contact with government sentries before realising their colleagues had turned around. Although some historians suggest the night attack might have remained viable if he had continued, most argue their numbers were too small to have any effect.

Not long after the exhausted Jacobite forces had made it back to Culloden, an officer of Lochiel's regiment, who had been left behind after falling asleep in a wood, arrived with a report of advancing government troops. By then, many Jacobite soldiers had dispersed in search of food or returned to Inverness, and others were asleep in ditches and outbuildings. Several hundred of their army may have missed the battle.

== Battle ==
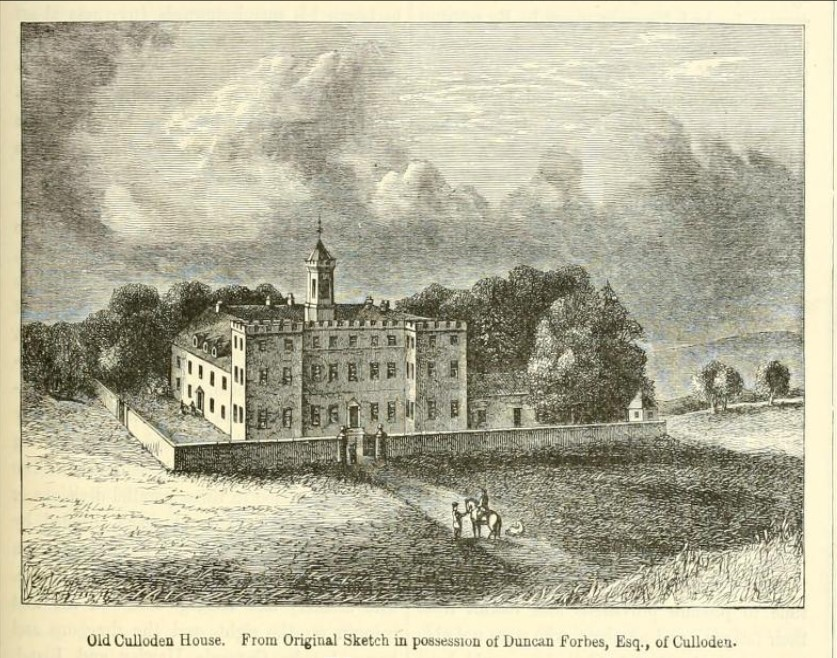
Culloden House, circa 1746, Charles' headquarters prior to the battle

After the abortive night attack, the Jacobites formed up in substantially the same battle order as the previous day, the Highland regiments forming the first line. They faced north-east over common grazing land, with the River Nairn about 1 km to their right. Their left wing, anchored on the Culloden Park walls, was nominally led by James Drummond, titular Duke of Perth, while his brother John commanded the centre. The right wing, flanked by the Culwhiniac enclosure walls, was led by Murray. Behind them, the conventionally trained Lowland regiments were drawn up in accordance with French practice. During the morning, heavy snow and rain saturated the already wet ground, although the weather cleared just before the battle started.

Cumberland's army left their encampment by 5 am, leaving the main Inverness road and marching across country. By 10 am the Jacobites finally saw them approaching at a distance of around 4 km. At 3 km from the Jacobite position, Cumberland gave the order to form line, and the army marched forward in full battle order. John Daniel, an Englishman serving with Charles's army, recorded that on seeing the government troops, the Jacobites began calling out insults, but without response. Once within 500 metres, Cumberland moved his artillery up through the ranks.

Starting positions at Culloden

As his troops formed up, it became clear that Cumberland's right flank was exposed, and so he moved additional units up to reinforce it. Meanwhile, Sullivan ordered two battalions of Lord Lewis Gordon's regiment to cover the walls at Culwhiniac against a possible flank attack, while Murray shifted the right wing slightly forward. Since these alterations had the unintended result of skewing the Jacobite line and opening gaps, Sullivan transferred the Edinburgh Regiment, along with those of Perth and Glenbucket, from the second line into the first. This meant the Jacobite front rank now substantially outnumbered that of Cumberland, but depleted their reserve and increased their reliance on a successful initial attack.

=== Artillery exchange ===
At 1:30 pm, Finlayson's Jacobite batteries opened fire; possibly in response to Cumberland sending forward Lord Bury to within 100 m of the Jacobite lines to "ascertain the strength of their battery". The government artillery returned fire shortly afterwards. Some later Jacobite memoirs suggest that their troops were then subjected to artillery bombardment for 30 minutes or more while Charles delayed an advance, but government accounts suggest a much shorter exchange before the Jacobites attacked. Campbell of Airds, in the rear, timed it at 9 minutes, but Cumberland's aide-de-camp Yorke suggested only 2 or 3 minutes.

The duration implies that the government artillery is unlikely to have fired more than thirty rounds at extreme range: statistical analysis concludes that would have caused only 20–30 Jacobite casualties at that stage, rather than the hundreds suggested by some contemporary accounts.

=== Jacobite advance ===
Shortly after 1 pm, Charles issued an order to advance, which Colonel Harry Kerr of Graden first took to Perth's regiment, on the extreme left. He then rode down the Jacobite line, giving orders to each regiment in turn. Sir John MacDonald and Brigadier Stapleton were also sent forward to repeat the order. As the Jacobites left their lines, the government gunners switched to canister shot, which was augmented by fire from the Coehorn mortars situated behind the government front line. As there was no need for careful aiming when canister was used, the rate of fire increased dramatically, and the Jacobites found themselves advancing into heavy fire.

On the Jacobite right, the Atholl Brigade, Lochiel's and the Appin Regiment left their start positions and charged towards Barrell's and Munro's regiments. Within a few hundred yards, however, the centre regiments, Lady Mackintosh's and Lovat's, had begun to swerve rightwards to try to avoid canister fire or to follow the firmer ground along the road running diagonally across Drummossie Moor. The five regiments became entangled as a single mass, converging on the government left. The confusion was worsened when the three largest regiments lost their commanding officers, all at the front of the advance: MacGillivray and MacBean of Lady Mackintosh's both went down; Inverallochie of Lovat's fell, and Lochiel had his ankles broken by canister within a few yards of the government lines. In 2024, in a 60 m² area near what is believed to have been the government front line, archaeologists recovered large numbers of musket balls and grapeshot, indicating extremely intense close-range combat.

The Jacobite left, by contrast, advanced much more slowly, hampered by boggy ground and by having several hundred yards further to cover. According to the account of Andrew Henderson, Lord John Drummond walked across the front of the Jacobite lines to try to tempt the government infantry into firing early, but they maintained their discipline. The three MacDonald regiments (Keppoch's, Clanranald's and Glengarry's) stalled before resorting to ineffectual long-range musket fire. They also lost senior officers, as Clanranald was wounded and Keppoch killed. The smaller units on their right (Maclachlan's Regiment and Chisholm's and Monaltrie's battalions) advanced into an area swept by artillery fire and suffered heavy losses before falling back.

=== Engagement of government left wing ===
Bayonet drill innovation said to have been developed to counter the "Highland charge". Each soldier would thrust at the enemy on his right – rather than the one straight ahead – in order to bypass the targe of Highlanders.

As it charged, the Jacobite right was hit hard by a volley at nearly point-blank range, but many of its men still reached the government lines. The brunt of the Jacobite impact, led by Lochiel's regiment, was taken by only two government regiments: Barrell's 4th Foot and Dejean's 37th Foot. Barrell's lost 17 killed and suffered 108 wounded, out of a total of 373 officers and men. Dejean's lost 14 killed and had 68 wounded, with the unit's left wing taking a disproportionately higher number of casualties. Barrell's regiment temporarily lost one of its two colours. (Note: An unknown British Army corporal's description of the charge into the government's left wing: "When we saw them coming towards us in great Haste and Fury, we fired at about 50 Yards Distance, which made Hundreds fall; notwithstanding which, they were so numerous, that they still advanced and were almost upon us before we had loaden again. We immediately gave them another full Fire and the Front Rank charged their Bayonets Breast high, and the Center and Rear Ranks kept up a continual Firing, which, in half an Hour's Time, routed their whole Army. Only Barrel's Regiment and ours was engaged, the Rebels designing to break or flank us but our Fire was so hot, most of us having discharged nine Shot each, that they were disappointed".)

John Huske, commanding the government second line, quickly organised a counterattack by Lord Sempill's Fourth Brigade, comprising 1,078 men from the 25th, 59th, and 8th Regiment of Foot. He also instructed the 20th Foot to take up position between the 25th and 37th, leaving the Jacobite right surrounded on three sides by five battalions. (Note: "Poor Barrell's regiment were sorely pressed by those desperadoes and outflanked. One stand of their colours was taken; Collonel Riches hand cutt off in their defence ... We marched up to the enemy, and our left, outflanking them, wheeled in upon them; the whole then gave them 5 or 6 fires with vast execution, while their front had nothing left to oppose us, but their pistolls and broadswords; and fire from their center and rear, (as, by this time, they were 20 or 30 deep) was vastly more fatal to themselves, than us")

With the Jacobite left stalled, Cumberland ordered two troops of Cobham's 10th Dragoons to ride them down. The boggy ground, however, impeded the cavalry, and they turned to engage the Irish Picquets whom Sullivan and Lord John Drummond had brought up in an attempt to stabilise the deteriorating Jacobite left flank.

=== Jacobite collapse and rout ===
To shore up his left wing, Murray brought up the Royal Écossais and Kilmarnock's Footguards, but the Jacobite first line had already collapsed. The Royal Écossais withdrew, using the Culwhiniac enclosure to shield themselves from artillery fire, while Stapleton's men covered the Highlanders' retreat. The stand by the French regulars gave Charles and other senior officers time to escape. Charles seems to have been rallying Perth's and Glenbucket's regiments when Sullivan rode up to Captain Shea, commander of his bodyguard, and ordered him to take the Prince away. (Note: "Yu see all is going to pot. Yu can be of no great succor, so before a general deroute wch will soon be, Seize upon the Prince & take him off ...".) Charles reportedly called for a final charge into the government lines, but Shea led him from the field.

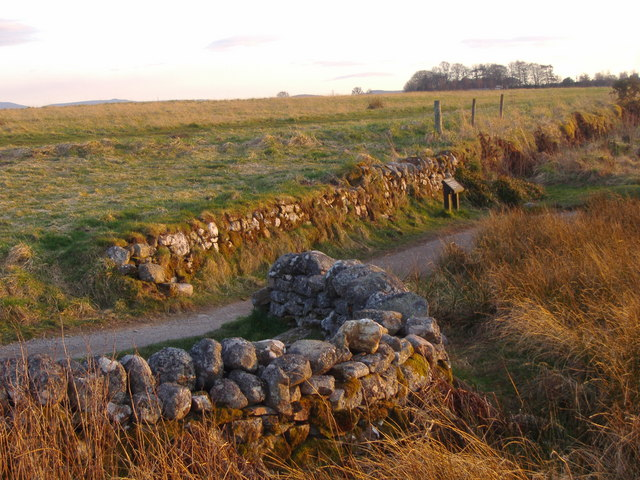
Well of the Dead; modern remains of the park wall on the Jacobite right

From that point onward, the fleeing Jacobite forces were split into several groups: the Lowland regiments retired southwards, making their way to Ruthven Barracks, and the remains of the Jacobite right wing also retired southwards. The MacDonald and the other Highland left-wing regiments, however, were cut off by the government cavalry and were forced to retreat down the road to Inverness. The result was that they were a clear target for government dragoons. Major-General Humphrey Bland led the pursuit of the fleeing Highlanders, giving "Quarter to None but about Fifty French Officers and Soldiers".

=== Casualties ===
Jacobite losses were between 1,500 and 2,000 killed or wounded, many in the pursuit after the battle. Senior officer casualties included Keppoch, Strathallan, and Walter Stapleton, who died of wounds shortly afterwards. In contrast, Cumberland reported 50 dead and 259 wounded, among them Lord Robert Kerr, who was killed, while Sir Robert Rich, 5th Baronet, commanding Barrell's 4th Foot, was badly wounded.

With the exception of the Jacobite lords, the majority of the 3,471 prisoners were initially held in Prison ships on the Thames, or at Tilbury Fort. Only one in twenty were actually put on trial, most of whom were transported to the British colonies for life under the Traitors Transported Act 1746. In all, around 1,200 were transported, 905 released under the Indemnity Act 1747, and 362 exchanged with France as prisoners of war. 120 were executed, one third of whom were British Army deserters, with sentences being carried out in Carlisle, York and London.

== Aftermath ==
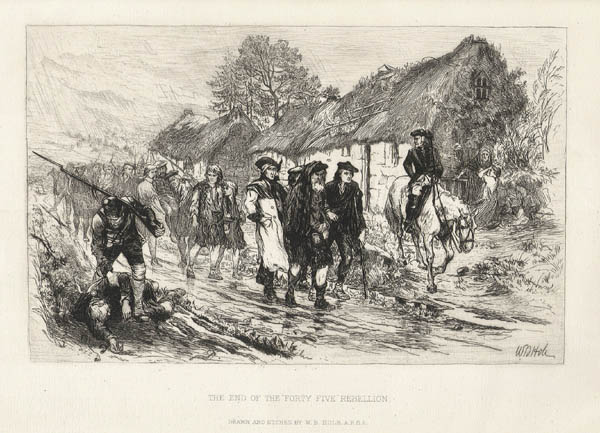
The End of the 'Forty Five' Rebellion depicts the retreat of the defeated Jacobites.

Following the battle, the Jacobite Lowland regiments headed south towards Corrybrough and made their way to Ruthven Barracks, and their Highland units made their way north towards Inverness and on through to Fort Augustus. There, they were joined by Barisdale's battalion of Glengarry's regiment and a small battalion of MacGregors. At least two of those present at Ruthven, James Johnstone and John Daniel, recorded that the Highland troops remained in good spirits despite the defeat and were eager to resume the campaign. At that point, continuing Jacobite resistance remained potentially viable in terms of manpower. At least a third of the army had either missed or slept through Culloden, which along with survivors from the battle gave a potential force of 5,000 to 6,000 men. However the roughly 1,500 men who assembled at Ruthven Barracks received orders from Charles to the effect that the army should disperse until he returned with French support.

Similar orders must have been received by the Highland units at Fort Augustus, and by 18 April, the majority of the Jacobite army had been disbanded. Officers and men of the units in French service made for Inverness, where they surrendered as prisoners of war on 19 April. Most of the rest of the army broke up, with men heading for home or attempting to escape abroad, although the Appin Regiment, amongst others, was still in arms as late as July.

Many senior Jacobites made their way to Loch nan Uamh, where Charles Edward Stuart had first landed at the outset of the campaign in 1745. There, on 30 April, they were met by two French frigates: the Mars and Bellone. Two days later, the French ships were spotted and attacked by three smaller Royal Navy sloops: the Greyhound, Baltimore, and Terror. The result was the last real engagement of the campaign. During the six hours in which the battle continued, the Jacobites recovered cargo that had been landed by the French ships, including £35,000 of gold.

With visible proof that the French had not deserted them, a group of Jacobite leaders attempted to prolong the campaign. On 8 May, nearby at Murlaggan, Lochiel, Lochgarry, Clanranald and Barisdale all agreed to rendezvous at Invermallie on 18 May, as did Lord Lovat and his son. The plan was that they would be joined by what remained of Keppoch's men and Macpherson of Cluny's regiment, which had not taken part in the battle at Culloden. However, things did not go as planned. After about a month of relative inactivity, Cumberland moved his army into the Highlands, and on 17 May, three battalions of regulars and eight Highland companies reoccupied Fort Augustus. The same day, the Macphersons surrendered. On the day of the planned rendezvous, Clanranald never appeared, and Lochgarry and Barisdale showed up with only about 300 combined, most of whom immediately dispersed in search of food. Lochiel, who commanded possibly the strongest Jacobite regiment at Culloden, mustered 300 men. The group dispersed, and the following week, the government launched punitive expeditions into the Highlands that continued throughout the summer.

After his flight from the battle, Charles Edward Stuart made his way towards the Hebrides, accompanied by a small group of supporters. By 20 April, Charles had reached Arisaig on the west coast of Scotland. After spending a few days with his close associates, he sailed for the island of Benbecula in the Outer Hebrides. From there, he travelled to Scalpay, off the east coast of Harris, and from there made his way to Stornoway. For five months, Charles crisscrossed the Hebrides, constantly pursued by government supporters and under threat from local lairds, who were tempted to betray him for the £30,000 upon his head. During that time, he met Flora Macdonald, who famously aided him in a narrow escape to Skye. Finally, on 19 September, Charles reached Borrodale on Loch nan Uamh in Arisaig, where his party boarded two small French ships, which ferried them to France. He never returned to Scotland.

== Commemoration ==
There appears to have been little interest in commemorating the battle before the 1840s. The Inverness Courier's account of the events surrounding the centenary in the spring of 1846 suggests that they had a recreational dimension, but as the century progressed, commemoration became more solemn and elegiac. Thoughts turned to erecting a physical memorial, and in 1849, a foundation stone for a Culloden monument was laid on the battlefield. By 1852, the project had been abandoned due to a lack of funds. A memorial stone carved by Edward Power in 1858 was eventually incorporated into the cairn erected on the battlefield in 1881. An annual commemoration ceremony under the auspices of the Gaelic Society of Inverness began in 1925, and a major event, attended by up to 500 people, marked the 200th anniversary of the battle in 1946.

== Culloden battlefield today ==
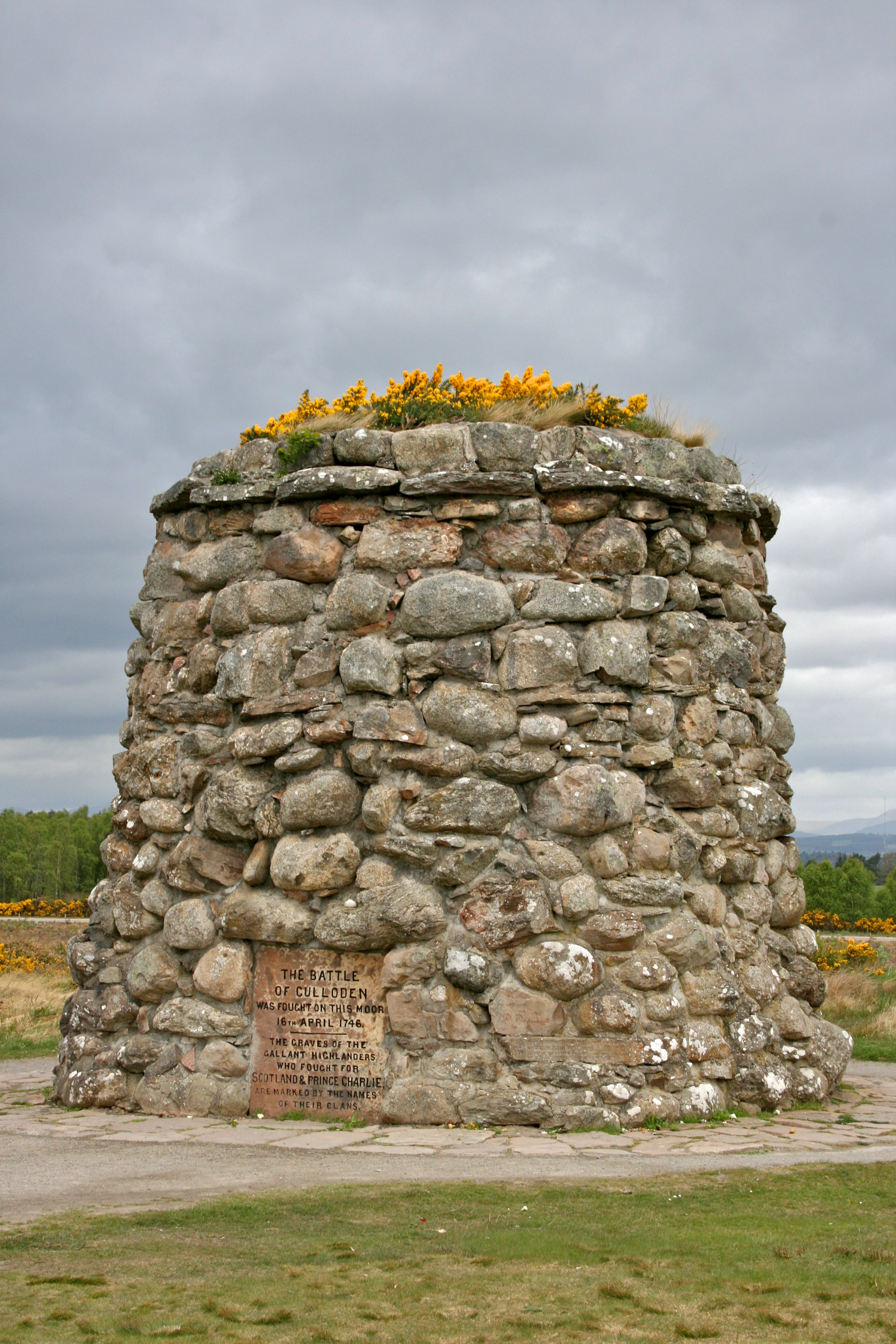
Memorial cairn erected in 1881

It was the last pitched battle fought on British soil. Today, a visitor centre is located near the site of the battle. It was first opened in December 2007, with the intention of preserving the battlefield in a condition similar to how it was on 16 April 1746. One difference is that it is currently covered in shrubs and heather. During the 18th century, however, the area was used as common grazing ground, mainly for tenants of the Culloden estate. Those visiting can walk the site by way of footpaths on the ground and can also enjoy a view from above on a raised platform. Possibly the most recognisable feature of the battlefield today is the 20-foot (6 m)-tall memorial cairn, erected by Duncan Forbes in 1881. In the same year, Forbes also erected headstones to mark the mass graves of the clans. The thatched roofed farmhouse of Leanach that stands today dates from about 1760; however, it stands on the same location as the turf-walled cottage that probably served as a field hospital for government troops following the battle. A stone, known as "The English Stone", is situated west of the Old Leanach cottage and is said to mark the burial place of the government dead. West of this site lies another stone, erected by Forbes to mark the place that the body of Alexander McGillivray of Dunmaglass was found after the battle. A stone lies on the eastern side of the battlefield and is supposed to mark the spot from which Cumberland directed the battle. The battlefield has been inventoried and protected by Historic Scotland under the Historic Environment (Amendment) Act 2011.

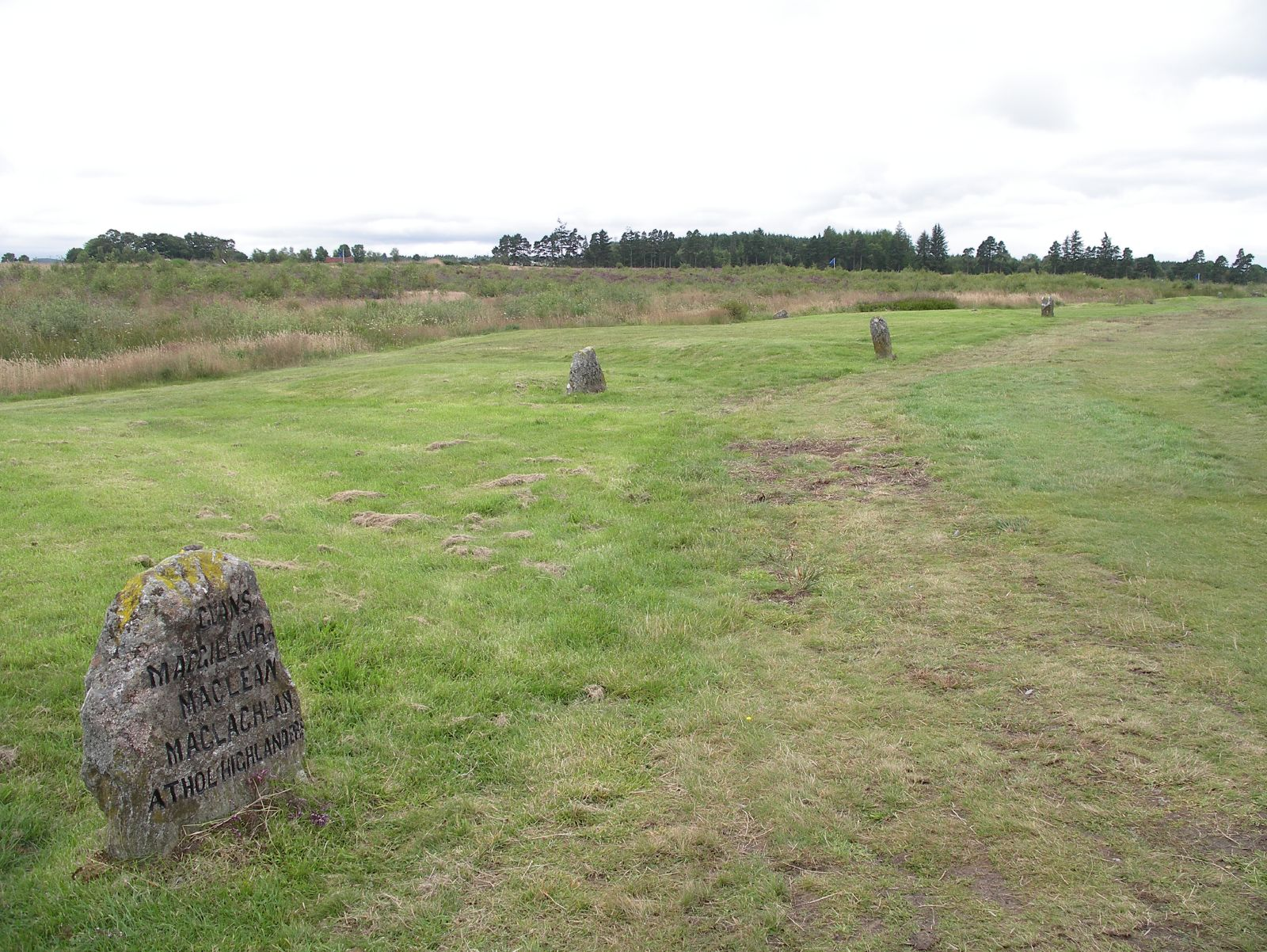
In 1881, Duncan Forbes erected the headstones that mark the mass graves of fallen Jacobite soldiers. They lie on either side of an early 19th-century road which runs through the battlefield.

Since 2001, the site of the battle has undergone topographic, geophysical and metal detector surveys in addition to archaeological excavations. Interesting finds have been made in the areas on which the fiercest fighting occurred on the government left wing, particularly where Barrell's and Dejean's regiments stood. For example, pistol balls and pieces of shattered muskets have been uncovered here, indicating close-quarters fighting, as pistols were used only at close range, and the musket pieces appear to have been smashed by pistol/musket balls or heavy broadswords. Finds of musket balls appear to mirror the lines of men who stood and fought. Some balls appear to have been dropped without being fired, some missed their targets, and others are distorted from hitting human bodies. In some cases, it may be possible to identify whether the Jacobites or government soldiers fired certain rounds because the Jacobite forces are known to have used a large number of French muskets, which fired a slightly smaller calibre shot than that of the British Army's Brown Bess. Analysis of the finds confirms that the Jacobites used muskets in greater numbers than previously thought. Not far from where the hand-to-hand fighting took place, fragments of mortar shells have been found. Though Forbes's headstones mark the graves of the Jacobites, the location of the graves of about 60 government soldiers is unknown. However, the recent discovery of a 1752 silver Thaler, from the Duchy of Mecklenburg-Schwerin, may lead archaeologists to these graves. A geophysical survey, directly beneath the spot at which the coin was found, seems to indicate the existence of a large rectangular burial pit. It is thought possible that the coin was dropped by a soldier who once served on the Continent while he visited the graves of his fallen comrades. In October 2025, archaeologists unearthed a complete 17.5 lb (8 kg) unexploded mortar shell, still packed with gunpowder. It is the only complete item of ordnance found at the site. It is thought to have been fired from a Coehorn mortar.

The National Trust of Scotland has been attempting to restore Culloden Moor, as closely as possible, to the state it was in during the Battle of Culloden Moor. It is also trying to expand the land under its care to ensure the full battlefield is protected under the NTS. Another goal is to restore Leannach Cottage and allow visitors to tour its interior once again.

== In art ==
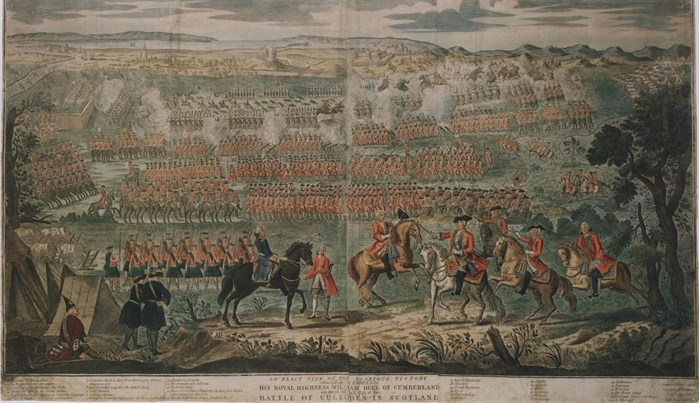
Woodcut painting by David Morier of the Battle of Culloden first published just six months after the battle, in October 1746

- An Incident in the Rebellion of 1745 (as shown in the infobox at the top of this page), by David Morier, often known as "The Battle of Culloden", is the best-known portrayal of the battle and the best-known of Morier's works. It depicts the attack of the Highlanders against Barrell's Regiment and is based on sketches made by Morier in the immediate aftermath of the battle.
- David Morier in fact made two paintings depicting the battle; the second (pictured right) is a coloured woodcut painting that shows a plan of the battlefield.
- Augustin Heckel's The Battle of Culloden (1746; reprinted 1797) is held by the National Galleries of Scotland.
- Frank Watson Wood, (1862–1953) was better known as a naval artist who mainly painted in watercolours, but he painted The Highland Charge at the Battle of Culloden in oil. He exhibited at the Royal Scottish Academy, the Royal Society of Painters in Water-Colours, and the Royal Academy.
- Handel's oratorio Judas Maccabaeus was written as a tribute to the Duke of Cumberland following the Battle of Culloden.
- The Battle of Culloden and the consequent imprisonment and execution of the Jacobite prisoners of war is depicted in the song "Tam kde teče řeka Fleet" ("Where the Fleet river flows") by the Czech Celtic Rock band Hakka Muggies.
- The Argentine band Sumo made a song, "Crua Chan", chronicling the development of the battle. The work was composed by the Italian-Scottish bandleader Luca Prodan. He learned of the battle as a student at Gordonstoun, Scotland.
- The Alexander McQueen fashion collection The Widows of Culloden (Autumn/Winter 2006) is inspired by the widows left after the battle.

== In fiction ==
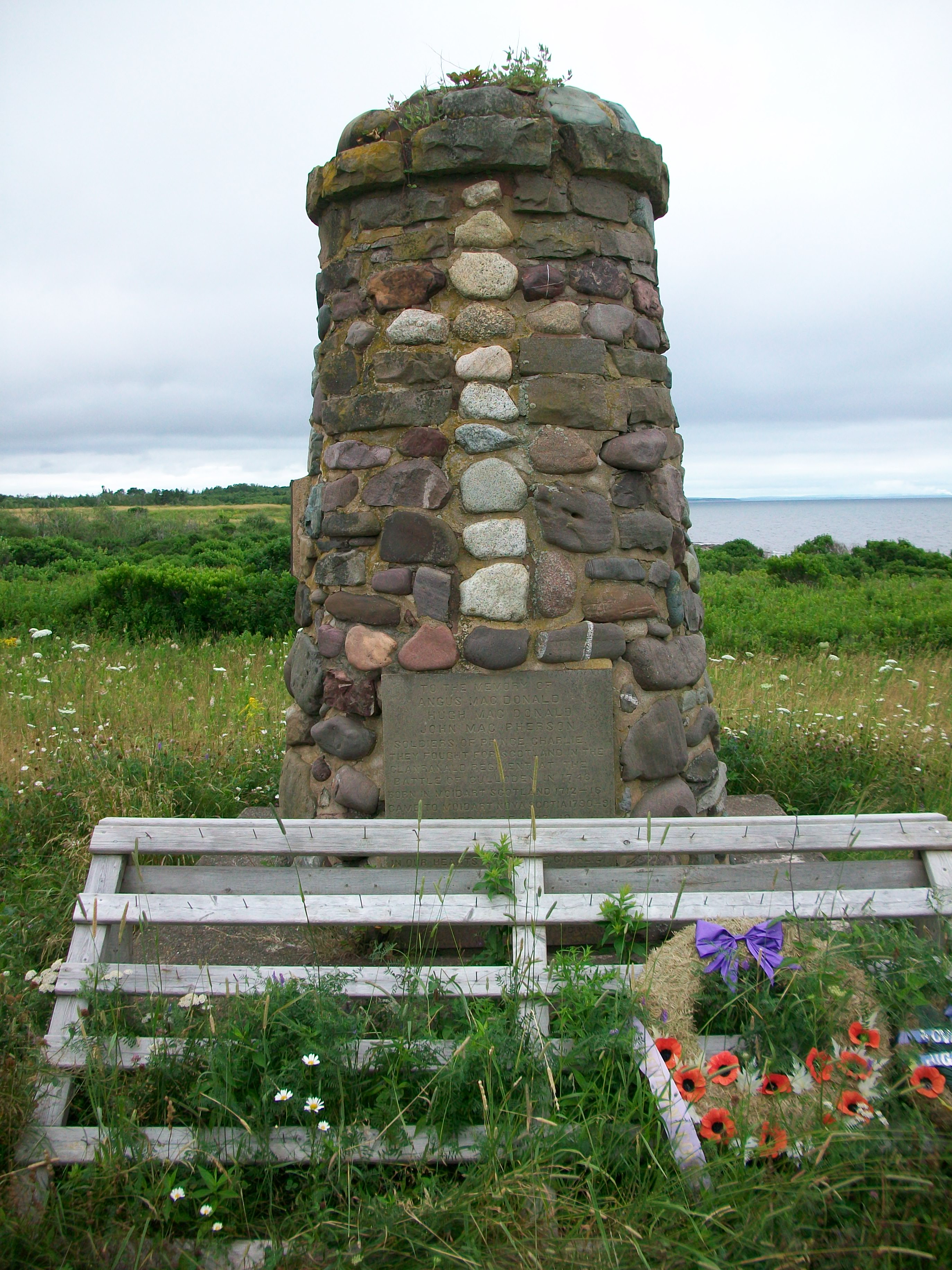
Culloden Memorial Cairn, Knoydart, Nova Scotia

- The Skye Boat Song was composed in the late 19th century and recalled the journey of Bonnie Prince Charlie from Benbecula to the Isle of Skye.
- The Battle of Culloden is an important episode in D. K. Broster's The Flight of the Heron (1925), the first volume of her Jacobite Trilogy, which has been made into a TV serial twice: by Scottish Television in 1968, as eight episodes and by the BBC in 1976.
- Naomi Mitchison's novel The Bull Calves (1947) deals with Culloden and its aftermath.
- Culloden (1964), a BBC TV docudrama written and directed by Peter Watkins, depicts the battle in the style of 20th-century television reporting.
- Dragonfly in Amber by Diana Gabaldon (1992, London) is a detailed fictional tale, based on historical sources, of the Scots, Highlanders, and Lowlanders, mostly the Highlanders within Clan Fraser. It has the element of time travel, with the 20th-century protagonist knowing how the battle would turn out and was still, once transported to the 18th century, caught up in the foredoomed struggle. The battle figures in the 29th episode (Season 2, episode 13) of the STARZ series Outlander, based upon Gabaldon's series of books. The battle and its importance to Scottish history is alluded to many times in the books and throughout the TV series.
- The Highlanders (1966–1967) is a serial in the BBC science fiction television series Doctor Who. The time-traveller known as the Doctor and his companions Polly and Ben arrive in the TARDIS in 1746, hours after the Battle of Culloden. The story introduces the character of Jamie McCrimmon.
- Chasing the Deer (1994) is a cinematic dramatisation of the events leading up to the battle, starring Brian Blessed and Fish.
- Drummossie Moor – Jack Cameron, The Irish Brigade and the battle of Culloden is a historical novel by Ian Colquhoun (Arima/Swirl 2008) that tells the story of the battle and the preceding days from the point of view of the Franco-Irish regulars, or 'Piquets', who covered the Jacobite retreat.
- In Harold Coyle's novel Savage Wilderness, the opening chapter deals with the protagonist's service battle of Culloden.
- In the Star Trek novel Home Is the Hunter, Montgomery Scott is sent back in time to 18th-century Scotland by an alien angered over the death of a child, and he participates in the Battle of Culloden before he is returned to the 23rd century.
- The Portuguese author Hélia Correia opens her novel Lillias Fraser (2001) in the aftermath of the Battle of Culloden. The work was praised by national critics when it came out and eventually won the PEN Club Fiction Award.
- The Canadian novel No Great Mischief, by Alistair MacLeod, dealing with a Scottish family that emigrated to Canada after the Battle of Culloden and examining how their past influences their present, contains numerous references to the battle.

== Sources ==
- Barthorp, Michael (1982). The Jacobite Rebellions 1689–1745. Osprey Publishing. ISBN 978-0-85045-432-1.
- Black, Jeremy (1998). Britain As A Military Power, 1688–1815. Routledge. ISBN 978-1857287721.
- Blaikie, Walter (1916). Origins of the Forty-Five. Scottish History Society.
- Bodart, Gaston (1908). Militär-historisches Kriegs-Lexikon (1618-1905) (in German). Wien und Leipzig, C. W. Stern. p. 207 – via Internet Archive.
- Brown, Stewart J. (1997). William Robertson and the Expansion of Empire. Cambridge University Press. ISBN 978-0-521-57083-1.
- Cowan, Ian (1976). The Scottish Covenanters, 1660–1688. London. ISBN 978-0-575-02105-1.
- Duffy, Christopher (2003). The '45: Bonnie Prince Charlie and the Untold Story of the Jacobite Rising. Cassel. ISBN 978-0-304-35525-9.
- Duffy, Christopher (2015). Fight for a Throne: The Jacobite '45 Reconsidered. Helion. ISBN 978-1910777053.
- Gibson, John G. (2002). Old and New World Highland Bagpiping. McGill-Queen's University Press. ISBN 978-0-7735-2291-6.
- Harrington, Peter (1991). Chandler, David G. (ed.). Culloden 1746, The Highland Clans' Last Charge. Osprey Publishing. ISBN 978-1-85532-158-8.
- Harris, Tim (2005). Restoration: Charles II and his Kingdoms, 1660–1685 (2006 ed.). Penguin. ISBN 978-0140264654.
- Harris, Tim (2006). Revolution: The Great Crisis of the British Monarchy, 1685–1720 (2007 ed.). Penguin. ISBN 978-0141016528.
- Home, Robert (1802). The History of the Rebellion (2014 ed.). Nabu Publishing. ISBN 978-1295587384.
- Lockhart, George (1817). The Lockhart papers: containing memoirs and commentaries upon the affairs of Scotland from 1702 to 1715. Vol. 2. W. Anderson.
- Maclean, Fitzroy (1991). Scotland, A Concise History. Thames and Hudson. ISBN 978-0-500-27706-5.
- Magnusson, Magnus (2003). Scotland: The Story of a Nation. Grove Press. ISBN 978-0-8021-3932-0.
- McGarry, Stephen (2013). Irish Brigades Abroad. The History Press. ISBN 978-1-84588-799-5.
- Monod, Paul Kleber (1993). Jacobitism and the English People, 1688–1788. Cambridge University Press. ISBN 978-0-521-44793-5.
- Paoletti, Ciro (January 2017). "The Battle of Culloden: A Pivotal Moment in World History". Journal of Military History. 81 (1). ISSN 0899-3718 – via EBSCO.
- Patterson, Raymond Campbell (1998). A Land Afflicted: Scotland & the Covenanter Wars, 1638–90. ISBN 978-0-85976-486-5.
- Pickering, W., ed. (1881). An Old Story Re-told From The "Newcastle Courant". The Rebellion of 1745.
- Pittock, Murray (2016). Culloden: Great Battles. Oxford University Press. ISBN 978-0199664078.
- Pollard, Tony, ed. (2009). Culloden: The History and Archaeology of the Last Clan Battle (Kindle ed.). Pen & Sword Military. ISBN 978-1781597972.
- Prebble, John (1962). Culloden. Atheneum. OCLC 920594.
- Prebble, John (1973). The Lion in the North. Penguin. ISBN 978-0-14-003652-7.
- Reid, Stuart (1996a). 1745, A Military History of the Last Jacobite Rising. Sarpedon. ISBN 978-1-885119-28-5.
- Reid, Stuart (1996b). British Redcoat 1740–1793. Osprey Publishing. ISBN 978-1-85532-554-8.
- Reid, Stuart (1997). Highland Clansman 1689–1746. Osprey Publishing. ISBN 978-1-85532-660-6.
- Reid, Stuart (2002). Culloden Moor 1746: The Death of the Jacobite Cause. Osprey Publishing. ISBN 978-1-84176-412-2.
- Reid, Stuart (2006). The Scottish Jacobite Army 1745–46. Osprey Publishing. ISBN 978-1-84603-073-4.
- Riding, Jacqueline (2016). Jacobites; A New History of the '45 Rebellion. Bloomsbury. ISBN 978-1408819128.
- Roberts, John Leonard (2002). The Jacobite Wars: Scotland and the Military Campaigns of 1715 and 1745. Edinburgh University Press. ISBN 978-1-902930-29-9.
- Royle, Trevor (2017). Culloden: Scotland's Last Battle and the Forging of the British Empire. Abacus. ISBN 978-1408704011.
- Sadler, John (2006). Culloden: The Last Charge of the Highland Clans. NPI Media Group. ISBN 978-0-7524-3955-6.
- Smith, Hannah (2006). Georgian Monarchy: Politics and Culture. Cambridge University Press.
- Smurthwaite, David (1984). Ordnance Survey Complete Guide to the Battlefields of Britain. Webb & Bower.
- Thompson, Andrew C (2011). George II: King and Elector. Yale University Press. ISBN 978-0-300-11892-6.
- Chenevix Trench, Charles Pocklington (1973). George II (1975 ed.). Allen Lane. ISBN 978-0713904819.

=== Film and documentaries ===
- Culloden, a 1964 docudrama about the battle, written and directed by Peter Watkins
- "Culloden: The Jacobites' Last Stand". Battlefield Britain. 2004. BBC.
