= John Drummond, 4th Duke of Perth =

Scottish noble, French army officer and Jacobite leader (1714-1747)

John Drummond
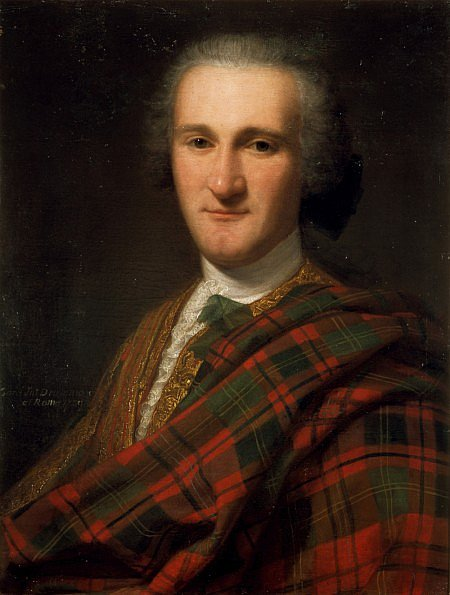
- John Drummond, 4th titular Duke of Perth, painted in 1739 by Domenico Duprà
- Born: 1714; Kingdom of France
- Died: 28 September 1747 (aged 32–33); Bergen op Zoom, Dutch Republic
- Burial place: Convent of the English Nuns, Antwerp
- Relatives: James Drummond, 2nd Duke of Perth (father); James Drummond, 3rd Duke of Perth (brother)
- Military career
- Allegiance: France; Jacobites
- Rank: Jacobite Lieutenant General
- Units: Regiment Roth, Irish Brigade; Jacobite Royal Scots
- Conflicts: War of the Austrian Succession; Bergen op Zoom †; 1745 Jacobite Rising; Falkirk Muir Culloden

John Drummond (1714–1747), titular 7th Earl and 4th Duke of Perth, often referred to by his courtesy title Lord John Drummond, was a Franco-Scottish nobleman, soldier and Jacobite.

Drummond served as an officer in the French Army, but is perhaps best known for his participation in the Jacobite rising of 1745, during which he was one of the senior Jacobite staff officers in addition to leading the Jacobite Royal Scots, a regiment raised by him in France.

== Early life ==
John Drummond was born in 1714 in France; he was the second son of James Drummond, 5th titular Earl and 2nd Duke of Perth, and Jane, daughter of George Gordon, 1st Duke of Gordon. His family were Catholics and committed Stuart loyalists: his grandfather the 4th Earl, the former Lord Chancellor of Scotland, had accompanied James II into exile in France before being created Duke of Perth in the Jacobite Peerage by James's son James Edward Stuart. John Drummond's father did not succeed to the earldom, having been attainted for participating in the Jacobite rising of 1715, though the Drummonds continued to style themselves using the family titles.

John Drummond's father had preserved the family estates in Scotland by transferring them to his oldest son James before the 1715 rising. Both sons were brought up by their mother at Drummond Castle in Perthshire until their father's death in 1720, when they were sent to the Scots College, Douai. John was said to have shown a preference for military subjects; he subsequently joined the French army as an officer, eventually reaching the rank of captain in the Irish Brigade's Regiment Roth, the lineal descendant of Dorrington's Irish Foot Guards. A return to Scotland during the 1730s rekindled his enthusiasm for the country.

Drummond was a prominent figure in the Jacobite exile community at Saint-Germain, living on the first floor of the chateau during the winter of 1743–4. Along with his brother James, he is supposed to have partly inspired Charles Edward Stuart's interest in Scotland: he presented Charles with a complete set of Highland weapons and his brother gave him clothing and a book of Scottish dances. Charles, however, seems to have found Drummond disrespectful and hard to get along with: in May 1745 he wrote to his father James claiming that "it is impossible [Drummond] can escape sooner or later from having his throat cut, for he is dayly affronting people and doing durty things". Drummond's quarrels with another of the Paris exiles, Sir Hector Maclean, required the intervention from Rome of James himself; Jacobite agent Murray of Broughton later suggested Drummond harboured ambitions to be made the main Jacobite representative in France.

== The Regiment Royal-Ecossais ==
While service as a mercenary abroad had relatively neutral connotations in the period, many Scots disliked serving in the Irish Brigade regiments, making recruitment difficult. The French government accordingly gave Drummond a commission to raise a Scottish regiment, the Regiment Royal-Ecossais or Royal Scots, with a view to its possible employment during a future invasion of Britain. A report written by the British agent "A.M." or "Pickle the Spy", now thought to have been Alastair Ruadh MacDonnell of Glengarry, claimed that Sir Hector Maclean was originally intended to be Lieutenant-Colonel, but Drummond "got a stop to [his] obtaining the Commission". An ordnance to raise the regiment was issued on 3 December 1743, France declared war on Britain in March 1744, and the regiment's first commissions were issued on 1 August.

Drummond's kinsman, Lewis Drummond of Melfort, was commissioned Lieutenant-Colonel while another relative, Viscount Strathallan, was given a captaincy. By December 1744 Drummond reported that the regiment had reached its full establishment: 12 companies of 55 men. While many were Scots or, like Drummond, from Scots exile families, the Royal-Ecossais also included English and Irish deserters from the British Army.

== 1745 rising ==
Drummond, the Royal Scots, the Irish Brigade picquets and a number of other French advisors and specialists were embarked at Dunkirk in late November 1745 to support the Jacobite Rising of 1745. Thanks to the Royal Navy blockade many were captured, but Drummond along with most of his regiment slipped past the blockade under the cover of a gale; the bulk landed at the Jacobite-held port of Montrose, with others reaching Stonehaven and Peterhead. On 2 December, Drummond issued a Declaration stating that they were "come to this Kingdom, with Written Orders, to make War against the King of England, Elector of Hanover, and all his Adherants"; he took over from Strathallan as the Jacobite Commander-in-Chief in Scotland, in control of a force of around 3,000.

The main Jacobite Army was by then approaching Derby on its march southward into England. Despite Charles's desire to press on towards London most of the army's senior leaders were troubled by the lack of visible support from English Jacobites or of a French landing in England and by news of two large government armies in pursuit. A message from Drummond confirming his arrival and promising further French reinforcement to come seemed to strengthen the argument for consolidating their position in Scotland, and on 5 December the Jacobite 'Council of War' decided to return there. At least one Jacobite memoirist, James Johnstone of Ogilvy's Regiment, later substantially blamed Drummond for the decision; "If Lord John Drummond [...] had advanced by forced marches, as he ought to have done [...] no-one of our army would have ever given his opinion of a retreat". Johnstone added that Drummond's report that ten thousand additional French soldiers were expected to follow was "inexcusable", as "this false information [...] greatly influenced us".

Despite Charles's orders that he march to England and join the main field army there, Drummond insisted that the Jacobite forces meet in the central Lowlands, citing French instructions that government-held fortresses should be reduced first. In the interim he sent some of his regulars to assist Lewis Gordon against the government's Independent Highland Companies, scattering them at Inverurie in late December. The two Jacobite armies eventually joined up on 4 January, forming a total force of some 9,500 men.

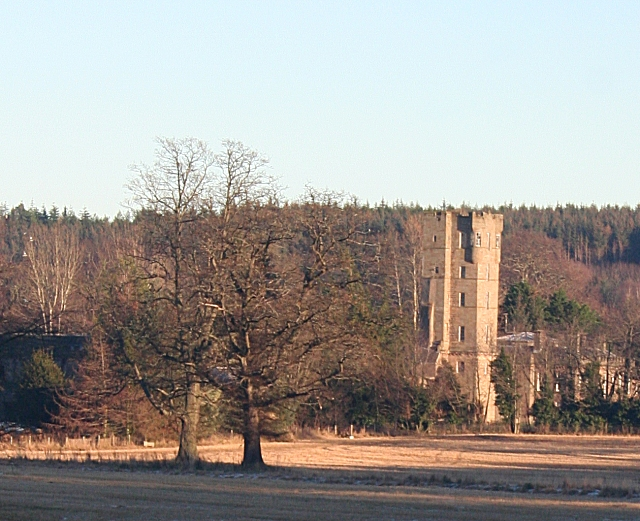
Gordon Castle, or the Bog of Gight. During March 1746 Drummond established his headquarters here while attempting to prevent Government forces crossing the Spey.

For the remainder of the campaign Drummond, with the rank of lieutenant-general, acted as one of the army's brigade commanders alongside his brother James and Lord George Murray. At Falkirk on 17 January he was appointed to command the Jacobite left, with Murray leading the right; his absence on reconnaissance at the start of the action may have impacted on the support available for Murray's attack, leading to mutual recriminations between the two afterwards. Despite this Drummond made a substantial personal contribution during the battle: he took several prisoners with his own hand, had a horse killed under him, and received a musket-shot in the right arm. During March Drummond was tasked with defending the line of the Spey against a government advance, establishing his headquarters at Gordon Castle near Fochabers.

Although personally courageous, Drummond was reputedly hot-tempered, arguing with both Murray and Charles himself. As a long-term exile he was occasionally insensitive to Scottish customs: when retreating through Aberdeen after Stirling, Drummond was said to have suggested hanging some Church of Scotland ministers "for examples". Johnstone also claimed to be unimpressed with his military abilities, stating he had "little knowledge in the art of war [...] so much the more extraordinary that he was a general officer in the service of France".

At Culloden Drummond commanded the centre regiments of the Jacobite line; during the battle Andrew Henderson recalled him walking across the front of the Jacobite lines "with a Fuzee in his Hand" to try and tempt the British troops into opening fire. Following the defeat at Culloden Drummond escaped Scotland on a French ship with several other senior officers, including his brother: James died on 13 May and was buried at sea. John Drummond was accordingly styled as 4th Duke of Perth afterwards, though a government act of attainder deprived him of the Drummond family's Scottish estates.

On his arrival in France in June he travelled to Versailles, giving the French court the first reliable account of the defeat at Culloden.

== Death ==
Drummond died at the siege of Bergen-op-Zoom on 28 September 1747 after falling sick with a fever. He had been brigadier in command of the picquets in the trenches; shortly before his death he was promoted to the rank of major-general. He was buried in the chapel of the English convent at Antwerp; the convent buildings were sold in the 1790s and a search in 1844 found his memorial had been lost.

== Successors ==
Drummond had no children, and was succeeded as titular Earl and Duke of Perth by his uncle John, the son of James, first duke, by his second wife.

Peerage of Scotland
Preceded by James Drummond	— TITULAR — Earl of Perth, Lord Drummond; Jacobite peerage 1746–1747	Succeeded by John Drummond
Preceded by James Drummond	— TITULAR — Duke of Perth, Marquess of Drummond, Earl of Stobhall, Viscount Cargill & Baron Concraig; Jacobite peerage 1746–1747	Succeeded by John Drummond
