= Royal Scots (Jacobite) =

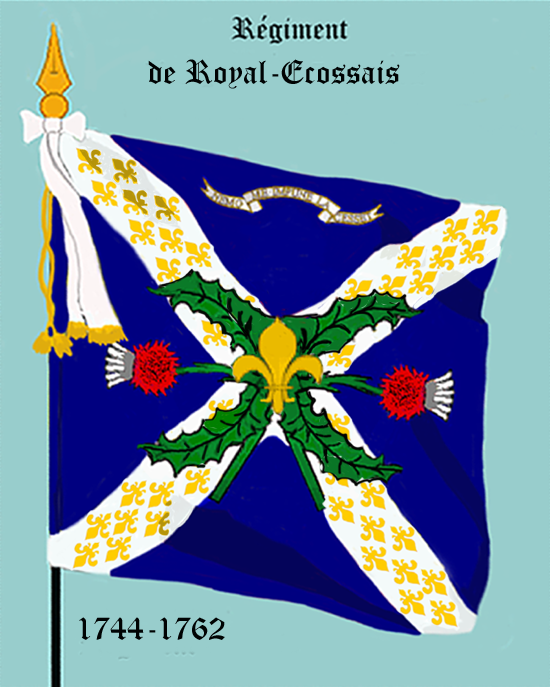
- Regimental standard
- Active: 1744–1762
- Country: France
- Branch: French Royal Army
- Type: Infantry
- Role: Line infantry
- Size: 12 companies; 600 men
- Motto: Nemo me impune lacessit ('No one assails me with impunity')
- Engagements: War of the Austrian Succession'; 1745 Jacobite Rising; Seven Years' War

Commanders
- Colonel of the Regiment: John Drummond

The Jacobite Royal Scots, sometimes called the Royal-Ecossais, (Note: In the French of the period this was generally spelt Ecossois.) Lord John Drummond's Regiment or French Royal Scots, was a French military regiment made up mostly of Scottish Jacobite exiles. Formed in 1744 under a 1743 order, they are perhaps best known for serving in Scotland during the Jacobite rising of 1745.

The regiment was disbanded in December 1762; its men were mostly incorporated into Bulkeley's regiment of the Irish Brigade.

== Formation ==
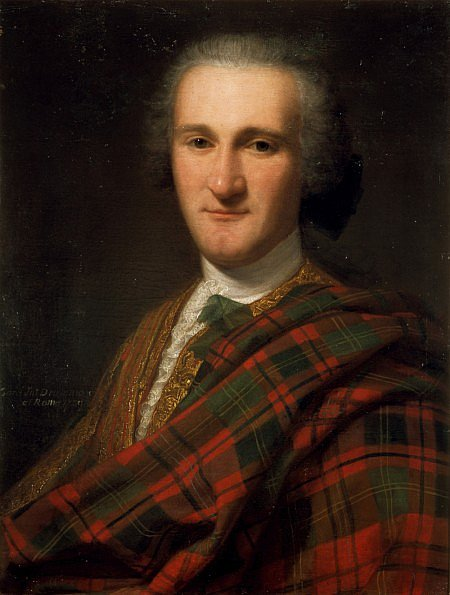
John Drummond, younger son of the 2nd Duke of Perth, was responsible for the regiment's formation and served as its first colonel.

The regiment was formed in August 1744 by John Drummond, a younger son of the 2nd Duke of Perth; Perth was a Catholic and Stuart loyalist who was attainted for his role in the 1715 Jacobite rising. In May 1745 Charles Edward Stuart wrote of Drummond that it was "impossible that he can escape having his throat cut, for he is dayly affronting people," but during the 1745 Rising he proved to be a reliable and experienced officer.

A number of Scottish exiles were already in French service in the Irish Brigade, including Drummond, who held the rank of captain. However, further recruitment in Scotland proved difficult as many Scots disliked serving under Irish officers, joining Dutch regiments for preference. The French government accordingly made formation of a Scots regiment a key element of its plan for a possible campaign in Scotland, with an intention to "confer captaincies on those Highland chiefs known to be loyal to the House of Stuart". A narrative written by "A.M." or "Pickle the Spy", a British intelligence agent now thought to have been Alastair Ruadh MacDonnell of Glengarry, claims that he was responsible for the regiment's formation when he was presented to Louis XV after Dettingen. "A.M." also suggested that Sir Hector Maclean was intended to be Lieutenant-Colonel, but Drummond "got a stop to [his] obtaining the Commission". An ordnance to raise the regiment was dated 3 December 1743; France declared war on Britain in March 1744, and the regiment's first commissions were issued on 1 August.

In addition to those Scots already in the Irish Brigade, Jacobite recruiting parties were active in Scotland in late 1744 and into 1745. Recruits were embarked at east coast ports like Montrose, where there were a number of Jacobite shipmasters. A further source of recruits was among deserters from the British Army on the Continent and the regiment eventually included men from England and Ireland in addition to those of Scottish or French origin. Later in its career its composition became even more varied; in 1749 one company included 41 Scots, 18 English, 16 Irish, 23 Germans, 15 Flemish and 33 French, as well as 24 'other'.

== Organisation and equipment ==
The establishment of the Regiment Royal-Ecossais was set at 12 companies, each of 55 men; one grenadier company and 11 fusilier companies. While officers in the period were still reluctant to adopt standard uniforms, the men were issued with dark blue coats of French cut and facings of orange-red "rouge a l'Ecossoise", waistcoats of the facing colour, white breeches and a laced hat. Uniforms were kept for special occasions, like battles; rough grey was usually worn for everyday use. During the 1745 rising, Jacobite service was indicated by white cockades worn in the hat: while they are sometimes said to have worn the distinctive woollen blue bonnet while in Scotland, this probably applied only to officers or to those recruits raised later in Perth.

Their colours, recorded in a French document of 1748, featured a St Andrew's Cross and thistles with a fleur-de-lis and the motto Nemo me impune lacessit.

== Service ==
The Royal-Ecossais initially served under Saxe and are widely said to have been present at Fontenoy in May 1745, though this may refer only to elements of the unit.

In late November 1745 they were embarked for Scotland. Not all units sent by the French were able to pass through the British blockade; one company (including MacDonnell of Glengarry) was captured with L'Esperance off the Dogger Bank, but Drummond and the remainder, under cover of a gale, were able to reach Montrose on 7 December. Most of the regiment was employed at Stirling in late January; constructing gun emplacements under fire caused regular casualties. In February recruitment began in Perth to raise a second battalion; this was not especially successful but the regiment was around 350 strong by the time of Culloden.

At Culloden the Royal-Ecossais appear to have been positioned flanking the right of the second line, though one source places them in the centre. After the failure of the Jacobite first line's attack, Lt-Col Lewis Drummond's battalion formed square before surrendering; other elements of the regiment under Maj. Matthew Hale covered the retreat of some of the Jacobite units towards Ruthven, surrendering two days later.

The government was initially unsure whether to regard British subjects in the Royal-Ecossais as rebels or prisoners of war. France responded by demanding the passports of all British people in France and threatening to arrest any found without one; the British government backed down and most from the French regiments were eventually discharged. Although many of them were found to be Scots or English Protestants, the authorities decided not to risk making further difficulties from the situation apart from 16 found to be deserters, who were hanged after courts martial.

During 1747 the regiment rebuilt to make up for losses sustained at Culloden and as prisoners of war returned from Britain. Back on the Continent, John Drummond served at the Siege of Bergen op Zoom in July–September 1747, where he was Brigadier in command of the piquets in the trenches; his regiment however does not seem to have joined him, being first recorded in October as part of the Armee de Saxe at Nieuport. Drummond died at Bergen op Zoom towards the end of the siege and Lewis Drummond took over as Colonel, with Lancelot Cuthbert of Castlehill as Lieutenant-Colonel.

The Royal-Ecossais' colonel from 1757 onwards was David Wemyss, Lord Elcho, an exiled veteran of the 1745 Rising; Elcho was left embittered by the regiment's disbandment, as well as with his experience of Jacobite and French service in general. Several other prominent Jacobite exiles also continued to serve as officers, amongst them Ewen MacPherson of Cluny, Donald MacDonnell of Lochgarry and Archibald Cameron of Lochiel, who was captain of the regiment's grenadier company.

It continued service during the Seven Years' War, often on garrison duties, until disbandment as the war was ending. The Royal-Ecossais regimental traditions were preserved by the French Army's 87th Infantry Regiment until the latter was disbanded in 1940.
