= Daviot =

Daviot may refer to:

- Daviot, Aberdeenshire
- Daviot, Highland
  - Daviot Castle
- Jean Daviot
- Gordon Daviot, pseudonym of the writer Josephine Tey
- George Daviot, character in Action for Slander
