= James Drummond, 3rd Duke of Perth =

Scottish Jacobite army officer (1713–1746)

James Drummond
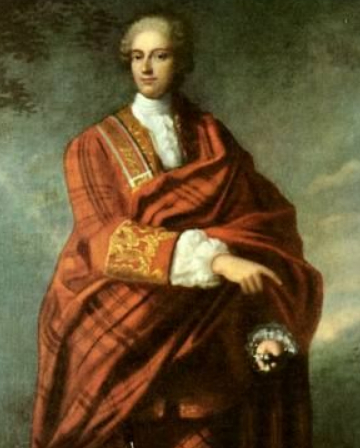
- James Drummond, 3rd titular Duke of Perth, from a portrait by Allan Ramsay
- Born: 11 May 1713; Drummond Castle
- Died: 13 May 1746 (aged 33)
- Occupations: Chief of the Name of Clan Drummond, landowner, Jacobite military officer
- Parent(s): James Drummond, 2nd Duke of Perth; Jane Gordon

James Drummond, 6th Earl and 3rd titular Duke of Perth (11 May 1713 – 13 May 1746) was a Scottish landowner and head of Clan Drummond best known for his participation in the Jacobite rising of 1745, during which Charles Edward Stuart attempted to regain the British throne for the House of Stuart.

Perth was one of two active lieutenant-generals of the Jacobite Army, although past historiography of the rising has tended to minimise his role. Following the defeat at Culloden, he escaped on a French ship with several other Jacobite leaders, but died during the voyage.

== Early life ==
James Drummond was born on 11 May 1713 at Drummond Castle, Perthshire. He was the eldest son of James Drummond, 2nd Duke of Perth and Jane, daughter of the 1st Duke of Gordon.

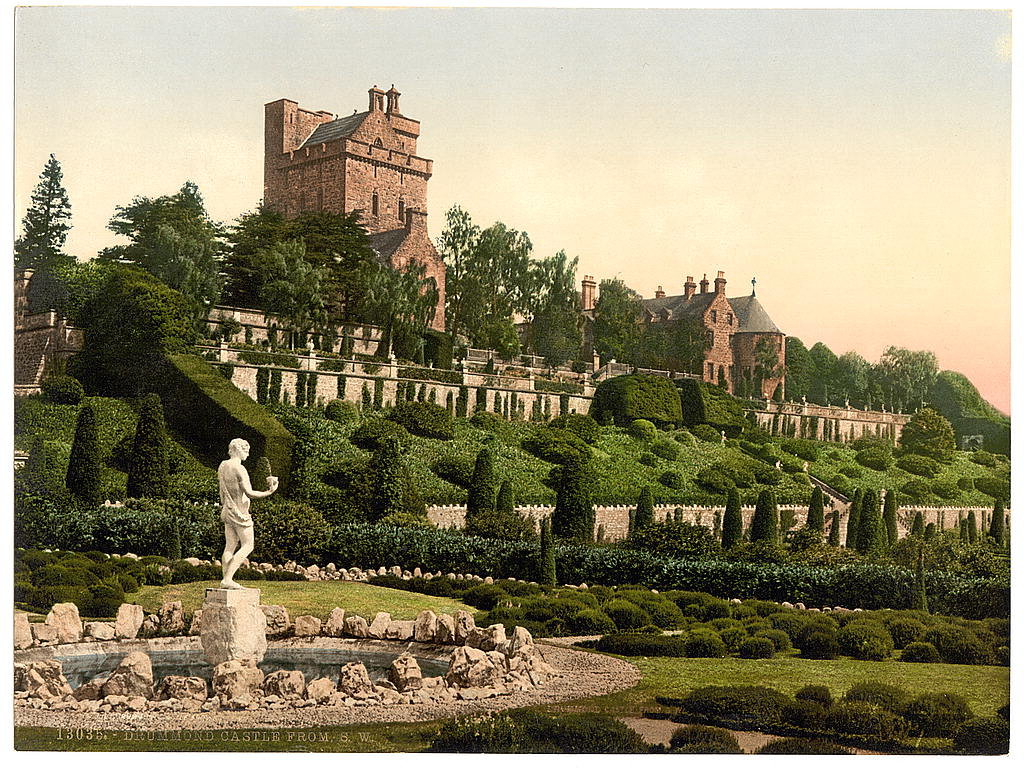
Drummond Castle, seat of the Drummond Dukes of Perth.

Perth's family had been closely associated with the Stuarts for several generations. His grandfather the 4th Earl and 1st Duke was Lord Chancellor of Scotland between 1684 and 1688; he converted to Catholicism after the accession of James II and VII. Following the Glorious Revolution he departed for France, becoming chamberlain to James's wife Mary of Modena. The 2nd Duke was attainted for his role in the Jacobite rising of 1715, but had preserved the large family estates by signing them over to his eldest son beforehand.

Perth was brought up at Drummond Castle until his father's death in exile in 1720, and was then sent for education at the Scots College, Douai. He returned to Scotland in the early 1730s; despite the title being unrecognised by the government, he was often styled as the 3rd Duke. Most contemporaries described him as an amiable man with a facility for getting on well with people of all social ranks: it was noted that Perth "never properly learned the English language, but invariably used broad Scots". As a landlord, Perth showed a strong interest in agricultural improvement; he set out plans for a new settlement at Callander in 1739, and was a member of the "Honourable Society of Improvers in the Knowledge of Agriculture in Scotland". He was also well known for breeding race horses: his horses ran at York and Doncaster several times during the early 1740s, and his bay gelding Chance won the Edinburgh Royal Plate in 1739.

== Jacobite rising ==
Although dismissed by Walpole as a "silly horse-racing boy", Perth was recognised by the government as one of the more committed Jacobite sympathisers, particularly as their reports identified his influence over "a Considerable Number of Barrons and Gentlemen of the Name of Drummond". In 1740, as French statesmen began to consider the possibilities of supporting the Jacobites as a counter to British interests, he formed a pro-Stuart "Association" with Lord Lovat, Lochiel and a number of other gentry. In mid 1743 John Murray of Broughton, the main Jacobite agent in Scotland, sounded Perth out on whether an independent rising there was feasible "should the French disappoint us"; he found Perth "abundantly forward". Perth later claimed to have secured a promise of support for any rising from the mayor and aldermen of York.

=== 1745 ===
On Charles's landing in Scotland in July 1745, Perth was one of the first sent a letter asking for support. The government were concerned enough by his local influence to send Duncan Campbell of Inverawe to Castle Drummond to detain him; Perth escaped by climbing out of a window.

He joined Charles at the town of Perth in September, accompanied by around 200 tenants from Crieff who were formed into the Duke of Perth's Regiment. Due in part to the penalties imposed on the area after the 1715 rising, Perth had difficulty raising men and the recruits were fewer than had been hoped. However, further men raised in the north-east joined Perth's regiment at Edinburgh; these included a group of volunteers from Aberdeen led by a lawyer, Roger Sandilands, and the 'Enzie' battalion from Banffshire under John Hamilton of Sandistoun, the Duke of Gordon's estate factor and a veteran of 1715. With the addition of some Highlanders of Clan Gregor and a number of 'deserters' from government service, Perth's regiment reached a strength of 750 by the time of the army's invasion of England. Its officers included James Johnstone and the Englishman John Daniel, later prominent memoirists of the rising.

Despite his relative youth, Charles commissioned Perth as the senior lieutenant-general of the Jacobite army alongside the older and far more experienced Lord George Murray. There was initially an arrangement that the two men would take command on alternate days; although in practice this meant they rarely interfered with each other's decisions, James Maxwell of Kirkconnell claimed that Murray was unhappy with serving under someone "certainly much inferior to him in years and experience". At Prestonpans, where the Jacobites defeated a Government force under Cope, Perth led the right wing brigade, made up of the MacDonald clan regiments, while Murray commanded the left wing.

Despite concerns over his practical military knowledge, Perth was personally well-liked. Kirkconnell said that he was "much beloved and esteemed even by those who did not wish to see him at the head of an army". Another colleague, Lord Elcho, said that Perth was "a very brave man" but claimed that he had "little genius" and was unquestioningly obedient to Charles, opinions echoed by Johnstone, who described Perth as "brave, even to excess, every way honourable [but] of very limited abilities". Murray's frustrations came to a head at the siege of Carlisle, where he also suggested that as a Catholic Perth was a politically unwise choice of army commander for an English campaign. As Murray admitted he "understood nothing of sieges", Perth took the lead role, attempting to recall the mathematics and fortification he had studied in France. Although the Jacobites secured the town's capitulation, Murray was unhappy with the handling of the siege and resigned: Perth gracefully relinquished his commanding role and Murray was reinstated, but the episode heightened tensions between the army's senior figures.

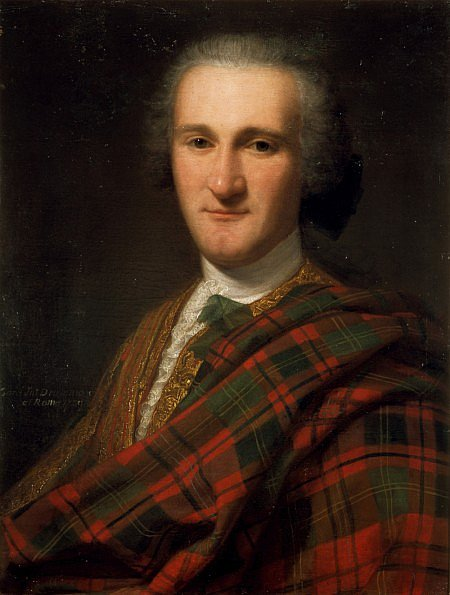
Perth's brother John Drummond; an experienced officer in the French military, he joined the 1745 rising towards the end of the year.

He retained the colonelcy of his own regiment, and membership of the Jacobite 'Council of War', on the march southwards. Perth had previously written to the Jacobite Tory MP for Denbighshire Watkin Williams-Wynn authorising him to recruit for the rising, and at Derby, where the Council voted to retreat to Scotland due to a lack of visible English and French support, he was one of the few members to suggest they march to North Wales.

In the interim Perth's younger brother John Drummond, a French regular, had arrived in Montrose with reinforcements, taking over in Scotland from Viscount Strathallan; for the remainder of the campaign Drummond, Murray and Perth would jointly act as brigade commanders. On the march north he was sent ahead to Scotland, accompanied by Murray of Broughton's Hussar regiment, to bring reinforcements; Perth's group had to turn back to Kendal after they were attacked by militia.

=== 1746 ===
At Stirling, the strategic key to the Highlands, Perth was in charge of the forces blockading the government garrison in the castle. The siege was unsuccessful and following the Jacobite victory at Falkirk on 17 January 1746, the army withdrew towards Inverness. From here, Perth was responsible for a number of minor actions including the so-called "Battle of Dornoch" on 20 March, an amphibious assault across the Dornoch Firth against Loudoun which has been called "the most accomplished that was staged by either side in the course of the rising".

At Culloden, where the Jacobite army was finally defeated, Perth again commanded a brigade made up largely of the Clan Donald regiments, this time on the army's left flank adjoining Culloden Park. The Jacobite adjutant-general O'Sullivan later wrote that on seeing the left wing troops reluctant to advance across boggy ground, Perth ran "to Clanranald's Regiment takes their Collors & tells them from that day forth he'l call himself MacDonel if they'll gain the day". According to some accounts, Perth was wounded in the hand and back at Culloden. He appeared at Ruthven Barracks the following day, where the army was told by Charles to disperse; after this his movements become less certain.

=== Escape and death at sea ===
Several of the Rising's participants, including Elcho and Perth, were able to escape on one of the French ships that landed at Borrodale on 3 May. Perth had always been said to have had a delicate constitution following a childhood accident; the campaign had taken a high physical toll on the participants and some accounts suggest that by this point he was unwell and was being carried by retainers. John Daniel later recalled seeing Perth waiting on the shore "wrapped up in a blanket"; he told Daniel "if we are so fortunate to get to France, depend upon it, then I shall always be your friend". During the voyage to France there was an epidemic of fever on the ships and Perth, on board the Bellone, was among those who died, on 13 May: as the ships were not able to reach the coast, he was buried at sea.

In a period when the Jacobite sympathies of many were the result of a complex mixture of political, religious, familial and other local factors, Perth's motivation appeared relatively straightforward to contemporaries: recording his death, Elcho wrote that "he was a very brave and gallant man and entirely devoted to the House of Stuart". Perth had no children, and his younger brother John inherited the claim to the ducal title.

Peerage of Scotland
| Preceded by James Drummond | — TITULAR — Earl of Perth, Lord Drummond; Jacobite peerage 1720–1746 | Succeeded by John Drummond |
| Preceded by James Drummond | — TITULAR — Duke of Perth, Marquess of Drummond, Earl of Stobhall, Viscount Cargill & Baron Concraig; Jacobite peerage 1720–1746 | Succeeded by John Drummond |
