= Augustin Heckel =

German painter (1690–1770)

- Born: 1690; Augsburg
- Died: 20 August 1770 (aged 79–80); Richmond, England, Great Britain
- Known for: Painting, engraving, draughtsmanship

Augustin Heckel (1690 – 20 August 1770) was a painter, watch case engraver, and draughtsman. He painted flowers in watercolours and gouache. Heckel was born to a family of goldsmiths in Augsburg. His career was in England, where he came as a young man. He died on 20 August 1770 in Richmond, Surrey (now in London), where he had retired in 1746.

== Works ==
Heckel's A West View of Richmond etc. in Surrey from the Star and Garter on the Hill, published in 1752 and now in the British Government Art Collection, was engraved by Charles Grignion the Elder.

He published two books of flower etchings of his own designs, The Lady's drawing book in 1755, and The Florist in 1759. Cambridge's Fitzwilliam Museum has an album of his drawings.

The British Museum holds two prints by John June after Augustine Heckel: Harrowing the Ground and Laying the Ground smooth & even for the Rice, by a second Harrowing, dating from about 1775.

The Victoria and Albert Museum holds: Heckel's A New Book of Sheilds [sic] usefull for all sorts of Artificers, an etching on paper dating from 1752; a gold box engraved by Heckel; a drawing of a design, dating from about 1740, described as being "for a cartouche with an acanthus leaf architechtonic frame surmounted by vases and supported by a caryatid in the form of a winged putto"; and a print from 1750–70, A Select Collection of the most beautiful Flowers, Drawn after Nature by A. Heckell; disposed in their proper Order in Baskets: Intended either for Ornament or the Improvement of Ladies in Drawing and Needlework.

Heckel's The Battle of Culloden (1746; reprinted 1797) is held by the National Galleries of Scotland.

His colour engraving of The Countess of Suffolk's House (1749) is held at Marble Hill House, Twickenham, London.

== Bibliography ==
- Richard Edgcumbe, The Art of the Gold Chaser in Eighteenth-century London, Oxford University Press, 2000, pp. 56–58. ISBN 978-0-19-817224-6
