= John Sadler (historian) =

British historical writer

- Occupation: Historian
- Writing career
- Subject: Anglo-Scottish warfare

John Sadler is a British historian specialising in the Anglo-Scottish Border conflicts during the Middle Ages. Sadler is a regular contributor to military and historical journals and has published a number of books on the subject. Some of his books were written in collaboration with Rosie Serdiville. He has taught and tutored history as well.

Sadler is a member of the living history group Time Bandits.

== Selected works ==
- (1988) Battle for Northumbria, UK: Bridge Studios ISBN 0-9512630-3-X
- (1996) Scottish Battles
- (2000) War in the North 1461–1464
- (2005) Clan MacDonald's Greatest Defeat: The Battle of Harlaw 1411, UK: NPI Media Group, ISBN 0-7524-3330-X
- (2005) Border Fury: England and Scotland at War 1296–1568, UK: Pearson Education Ltd, ISBN 1-4058-4022-6
- (2006) Culloden: The Last Charge of the Highland Clans, UK: NPI Media Group, ISBN 0-7524-3955-3
- (2006) Raiders and Reivers
- (2006) Flodden 1513
- (2014) Blood Divide: A Novel of Flodden Field
