= James Drummond, 2nd Duke of Perth =

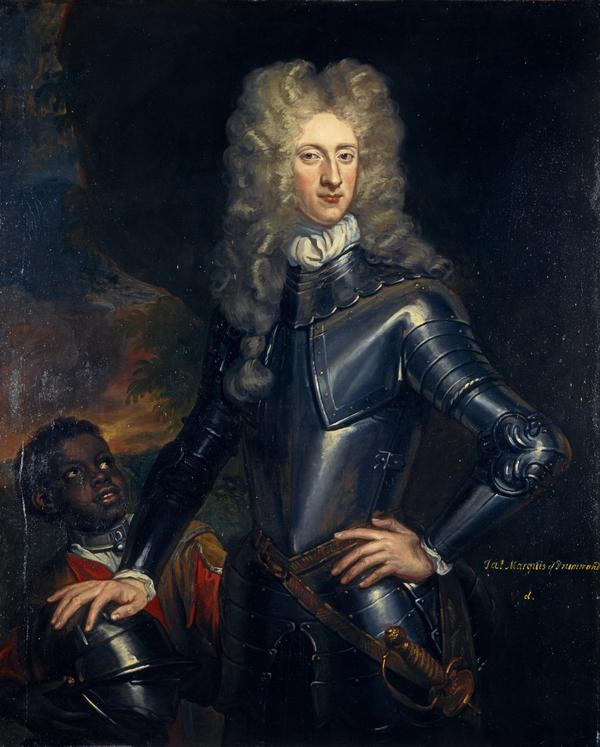
Portrait of Perth and an enslaved boy by John Baptist Medina

James Drummond, 2nd Duke of Perth, etc., (c. 1674 – 17 April 1720) was a Scottish nobleman. He held the Peerage created for his father, James Drummond, 4th Earl of Perth, by the exiled Stuart monarchs at St Germain.

== Life ==
The eldest son and heir of the 1st Duke and 4th Earl by his first wife, Lady Jane, daughter of William Douglas, 1st Marquess of Douglas, he was educated at the Scots College, (Paris).

In 1689 he accompanied King James II of England, and VII of Scotland, to Ireland, and led the cavalry at the Battle of Sheriffmuir. Afterwards he joined Lord Mar during the 1715 Uprising in Scotland. He escaped to France with the King on 6 February and was attainted on 17 February 1716 (1 Geo. 1. St. 2. c. 32). As the Marquess of Drummond he was created a Knight of the Thistle in March 1705, when he became Master of the Horse. He succeeded his father on 11 May 1716, but as a consequence of his attainder he was not recognised by the British government. He died at Paris aged 46 years, and was buried in the Scots' College.

== Family ==
Drummond married (contract dated 5 August 1706) Lady Jane, daughter of George Gordon, 1st Duke of Gordon by Lady Elizabeth, daughter of Henry Howard, 6th Duke of Norfolk. Lady Jane was imprisoned in Edinburgh Castle from February to November 1746 for her part in the 1745 Uprising, and died at Stobhall, Perthshire, on 30 January 1773, aged about 90.

The 2nd Duke was succeeded by his sons and heirs:

- James Drummond, 3rd Duke of Perth, etc., (1713–1746) (attainted, died unmarried).
- John Drummond, 4th Duke of Perth, etc., (c. 1716 – 1747) (attainted, died unmarried).

The title thence passed (notwithstanding the attainders) to sons of the 1st Duke by his second and third wives.

Peerage of Scotland
Preceded by James Drummond	— TITULAR — Earl of Perth, Lord Drummond; Jacobite peerage 1716–1720	Succeeded by James Drummond
Preceded by James Drummond	— TITULAR — Duke of Perth, Marquess of Drummond, Earl of Stobhall, Viscount Cargill & Baron Concraig; Jacobite peerage 1716–1720	Succeeded by James Drummond
