= Thomas Murray (British Army officer, died 1816) =

British Army general

General Thomas Murray
- Died: 24 April 1816; Malta
- Military career
- Allegiance: United Kingdom
- Branch: British Army
- Rank: General
- Conflicts: American Revolutionary War

General Thomas Murray (died 24 April 1816) was a British Army officer who became Lieutenant-Governor of Portsmouth.

== Military career ==
Born the son of John Murray of Stanhope, Murray served as aide-de-camp to General James Robertson, Governor of New York in the early 1780s during the American Revolutionary War. He became Lieutenant-Governor of Portsmouth and General Officer Commanding South-West District in February 1799 and then was given command of Northern District in 1801. He was also colonel of the 7th Royal Veteran Battalion. He was promoted to full general in June 1814 and died at Malta on 24 April 1816.

Military offices
| Preceded by Cornelius Cuyler | GOC South-West District; February 1799 – June 1799 | Succeeded by John Whitelocke |
