= Watchcase =

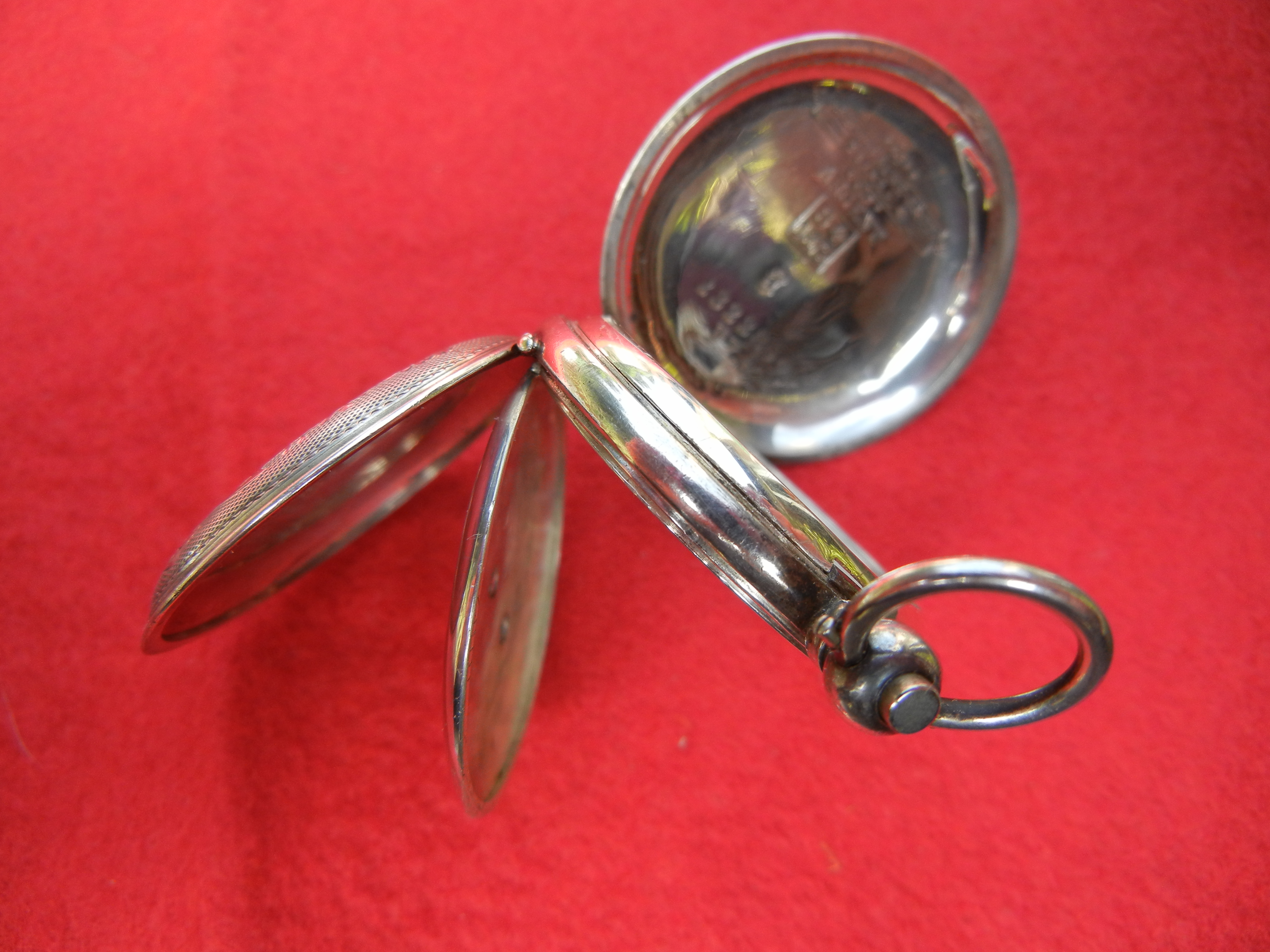
A case for a pocket watch, 1870. The outer clamshell protects the watch. The inner layer contains a glass window. The ring is for the attachment of a chain.

A watchcase is a usually metal clamshell case for a mechanical watch, common until the early twentieth century. It is meant to sit around the inner case of the watch. The term refers to the component holding the main watch components.
