= Daviot Castle =

Castle in Highland, Scotland

Coordinates: 57.4389°N 4.1187°W

- Daviot, Highland, Scotland

Site information
- Type: Castle
- Condition: Ruined

Site history
- Built: 15th century
- Built by: Lindsay family
- Materials: Rubble masonry

Scheduled monument
- Official name: Daviot Castle
- Reference no.: SM5486

Daviot Castle was an early 15th-century castle, about 6 miles (10 kilometres) southeast of Inverness, Highland, Scotland, and west of the River Nairn at Daviot. Also known as Strathnairn Castle, its remains are designated as a scheduled monument.

== History ==
A castle was built at Daviot by the Moravia family.

The later castle was constructed by the Lindsay Earls of Crawford, probably David Lindsay, 1st Earl of Crawford. The Mackintoshes acquired it and built the house nearby.

A green-veined stone axe head was found on the property in 1856 and was exhibited by Archaeological Institute of Great Britain and Ireland in Edinburgh.

== Structure ==
Daviot Castle had both a keep and a courtyard. It is thought that it occupied the flat top of the small promontory which runs north from the present Daviot House. There were steep natural slopes defending it to the north, west and east. There was a dry ditch and drawbridge, probably to the south, but there is now no trace of the ditch. The castle was probably square in shape with four circular towers on its corners. The walls, towers and part of the gate were still intact at the beginning of the 18th century. The ruins still existed in 1840. They were subsequently destroyed to provide lime for manure.

The surviving remains consist of a 4.1-metre-diameter (13 ft) tower of rubble masonry, a stub section of adjacent curtain wall, and the foundations of the south east tower. The surviving tower is believed to be that of the north east corner of the castle; its walls are 1.7 m (6 ft) thick and its interior height ranges from 4.5 m (15 ft) on its east side to ground level on the west. The 0.5-metre-long (1 ft 8 in) wall section is 0.7 m (2 ft 4 in) thick and its height varies from 1 to 3 m (3 to 10 ft).
