= George Gordon, 1st Duke of Gordon =

Scottish peer (1643–1716)

His Grace The Duke of Gordon KT PC
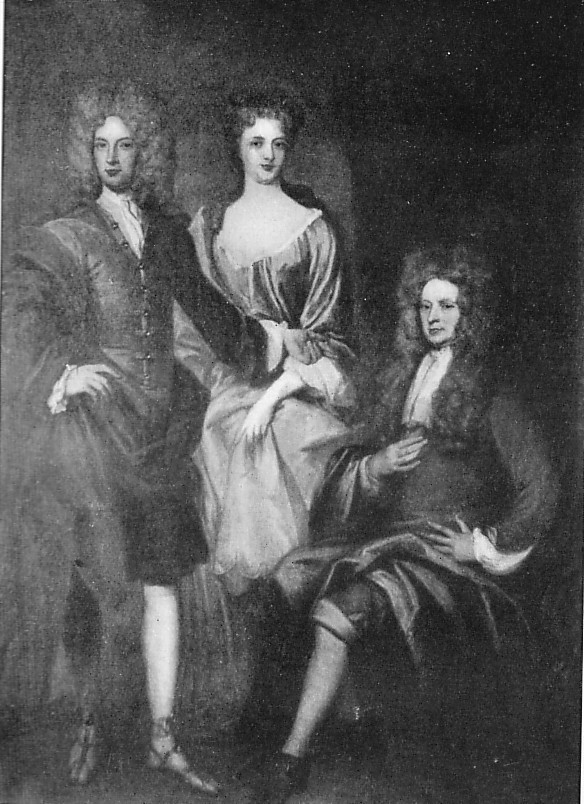
- George, 1st Duke of Gordon (seated) with his children.

1st Duke of Gordon
- Reign: 1 November 1684 – 7 December 1716
- Successor: Alexander Gordon, 2nd Duke of Gordon
- Born: 1643
- Died: 7 December 1716 (aged 72–73); Citadel, North Leith
- Buried: Elgin Cathedral
- Noble family: Gordon
- Spouse: Lady Elizabeth Howard
- Issue: Alexander Gordon, 2nd Duke of Gordon; Jane Gordon, Duchess of Perth
- Father: Lewis Gordon, 3rd Marquess of Huntly
- Mother: Mary Grant

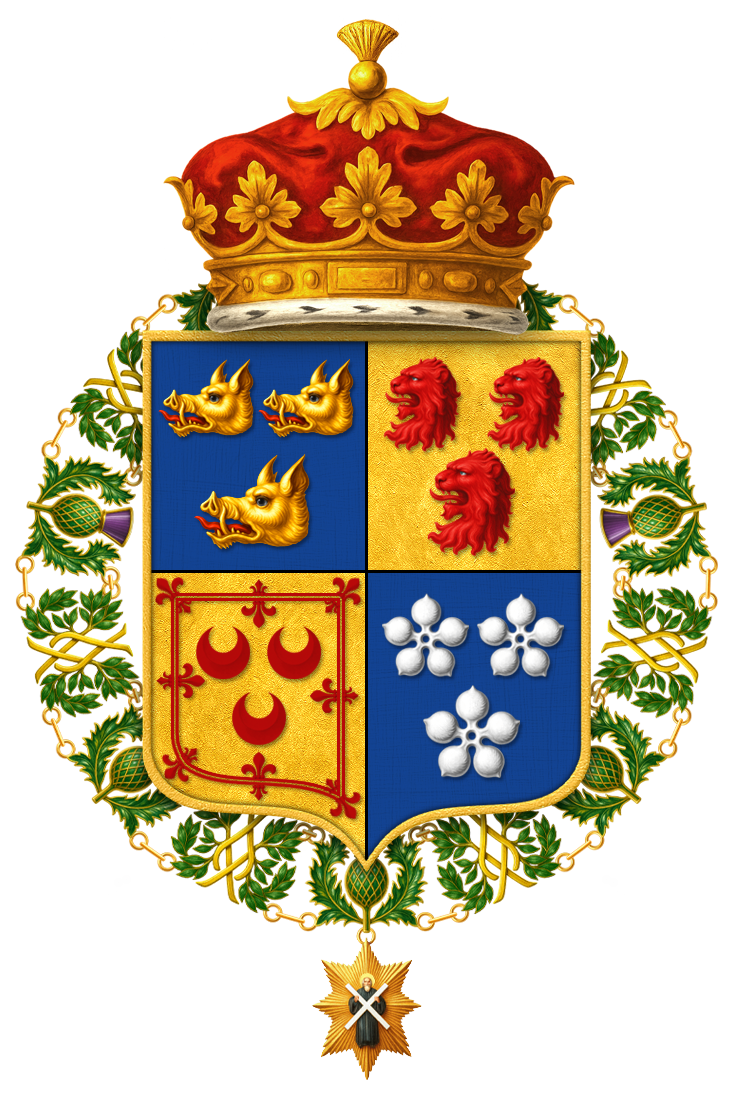
Shield of Arms of George Gordon, 1st Duke of Gordon KT, PC

George Gordon, 1st Duke of Gordon KT, PC (1643 – 7 December 1716), known as the Marquess of Huntly from 1661 to 1684, was a Scottish peer.

George Gordon, 4th Marquess of Huntly was born in 1643, the son of Lewis Gordon, 3rd Marquess of Huntly and Mary Grant. He was originally styled the Earl of Enzie until his succession as Marquess in December 1653, when he was around four years old. The young Marquess was educated at a Catholic seminary in France, following a tradition within the Huntly family. In 1673, when he was aged 24, he entered the French Army of Louis XIV and served under the famous Marshal de Turenne before returning to Scotland sometime around 1675.

In October of the following year, 1676, he married Lady Elizabeth Howard, the second daughter of Henry Howard, 6th Duke of Norfolk. However, he was described by the historian John Macky as someone "made for the company of ladies, but is covetous which extremely eclipses him." The marriage was not wholly successful and the couple parted some years before his death.

On 1 November 1684, George was advanced from Marquess of Huntly, becoming the first Duke of Gordon. Following the accession of the Catholic James VII in 1685, the Duke was made one of the Commissioners of Supply, Constable and Governor of Edinburgh Castle, a Commissioner of the Scottish Treasury and a founding Knight of the Order of the Thistle. The Duke owed these positions to his Catholicism, Around this time, he was described as being "a libertine and a fop, he is a Roman Catholic because he was bred so, but otherwise thinks very little of revealed religion."

Following the Glorious Revolution and the overthrow of James VII, the Duke held Edinburgh Castle for the Jacobite cause against the Williamite Conventionists. Gordon held out for six months, in total (December 1688 to June 1689). On 18 March, 1689, Viscount Dundee, intent on raising a rebellion in the Highlands, climbed up the western side of the Castle Rock to urge Gordon to hold the castle against the new King. Gordon agreed and held out for a further three months. However, he is remembered by some as being "vacillating in his defence" and eventually surrendered the Castle on 14 June 1689. As a result of his actions in Edinburgh, he was received somewhat coldly by King James at his residence in exile, the Château de Saint-Germain-en-Laye, near Paris. On his return to Scotland he was confined on parole. Shortly after this, his Duchess left him and retired to a convent in Flanders. The Duke temporarily regained favour with the accession of Queen Anne in 1702 and was recognised by her as a Knight of the Thistle when she revived the Order on 31 December 1703.

In March 1707, he was arrested along with other Jacobite Lords and was confined to Edinburgh Castle for being implicated in the aborted Jacobite invasion. For his long-suffering Duchess, this was the final straw, and she obtained a deed of separation from her husband. The historian Macky, in his book Characters, observed the Duke and said that "he hath a great many links, but they do not make a complete chain; is certainly a very fine gentleman and understands conversation and the belles lettres; is well bred. He is handsome and taller than the ordinary size; thin, dresses well; but is somewhat finical, resembling the French".

The Duke died at his residence in the Citadel in North Leith, on 7 December 1716. The Duchess returned to Scotland after his death and resided at Abbey Hill in Edinburgh until her own death in July 1732. Like her husband, she was buried in Elgin Cathedral.

== Family ==
The duke married Lady Elizabeth Howard, daughter of Henry Howard, 6th Duke of Norfolk and with her had two children:

- Alexander Gordon, 2nd Duke of Gordon (ca. 1678 – 1728)
- Lady Jane Gordon (ca. 1691 – 1773), married James Drummond, 2nd Duke of Perth and had issue.

Peerage of Scotland
New creation	Duke of Gordon; 1684 – 1716	Succeeded by Alexander Gordon
Preceded by Lewis Gordon	Marquess of Huntly; 1653 – 1716	Succeeded by Alexander Gordon
