= Andrew Henderson (writer) =

Scottish writer and bookseller

Andrew Henderson (fl. 1731 – 1775) was a Scottish writer and bookseller.

Henderson was born in Roxburghshire. Between 1731 and 1735 he attended Marischal College, Aberdeen, gaining a MA. In January 1748 he published an account of the Jacobite rising of 1745, The History of the Rebellion, 1745 and 1746. In 1766 he published The life of William Augustus, Duke of Cumberland, which praised the Duke. This brought him into controversy with Tobias Smollett. He also attacked William Guthrie's History of Scotland in a Dissertation on the Royal Line of Scotland (1771). He has been described as an "extremely patriotic" Scot.
