= List of English cricketers (1701–1786) =

Cricketers of the 18th century before the foundation of MCC

This is a list of English cricketers who were first recorded in historically important matches played between the 1701 and 1786 seasons. (Note: Any match listed in the ACS' Important Match Guide (1981) is historically important, and therefore of the highest standard, whether or not a scorecard might exist. The same applies to top-class single wicket matches, and to numerous matches discovered by researchers since 1981. For further information, see First-class cricket.) (Note: Surviving match records to 1825 are incomplete, and any statistical compilation of a player's career in that period is based on known data only, which means the compilation must be incomplete, and therefore false if presented as fact. In addition, match scorecards were not always created, or have been lost, and the matches themselves were not always recorded in the press or other media. Scorecard data was not comprehensive: e.g., bowling analyses lacked balls bowled and runs conceded; bowlers were not credited with wickets when the batsman was caught or stumped; in many matches, the means of dismissal were omitted.) People known to have participated before 1701 are listed under Earliest known participants. 1786 was the season before Thomas Lord, backed by the White Conduit Club (WCC), opened his original ground in May 1787, with Marylebone Cricket Club (MCC) being founded soon afterwards. Players who were first recorded in or after the 1787 season may be found in List of English cricketers (1787–1825).

In the 18th century, more information is available in the sources than in the 17th, so it is easier to identify the active players, and the clubs or county teams with which they were most usually associated. Although some people like the Dukes of Richmond are remembered primarily as patrons, they were invariably players too, and generally captained their own teams. Cricket underwent radical changes during the 18th century. Patronage and popular support enabled it to outgrow its roots as a village pastime, and develop into a major sport in southeast England which had begun its spread through the rest of the country by 1787. The Laws of Cricket were first written in 1744, and revised in 1774. In the early 1760s, pitched delivery bowling was introduced, and this necessitated the invention of the straight bat: an evolution in bowling and batting techniques.

Inter-county matches were fairly common from about 1730, but they were mostly organised on an ad hoc basis, and there was no formal championship. The main county teams were Hampshire, Kent, Surrey, and Sussex. By the end of the period, Berkshire, Essex, and Middlesex had also become prominent. A key feature was the parish or town club, some of which effectively represented their counties. Among them were Chertsey, Dartford, Hambledon, London, Nottingham, Sheffield, and Slindon. Many matches involved occasional XIs named after their patrons, and teams labelled as England.

Much of our knowledge about 18th century players has come from match scorecards. The earliest known scorecards date from 1744, but only a handful exist from then until 1772 when they began to be completed and preserved on a regular basis. As such, the sport's statistical record begins in 1772, but scorecards until the Lord's Pavilion fire in July 1825 are often incomplete, or have been irretrievably lost. Key sources for the more important historical record are the works of Arthur Haygarth, F. S. Ashley-Cooper, H. T. Waghorn, G. B. Buckley, Rowland Bowen, Tim McCann, and Ian Maun, among others.

Note #1: Online databases are excluded from this work as the scope is historical, and NOT statistical.
Note #2: The list is not necessarily exhaustive, as ongoing research is always likely to discover additional information.
Note #3: Inline citations reference the debut or earliest known mention of each player.
Note #4: Where a player's name is preceded by a † symbol, the article is a redirect to this list.

== A ==
name	club/county	years	notes
Edward Aburrow Sr	Slindon and Sussex	1744–1751	Also known as "Cuddy", he was a notorious smuggler. An outstanding bowler, and a noted single wicket player. Father of "Curry" Aburrow.
Edward Aburrow Jr	Hambledon and Hampshire	1772–1782	Also known as "Curry", a Hampshire regular to 1782. Son of "Cuddy" Aburrow.
† Allen	Dartford, Kent, and Middlesex	1747–1759	Recorded in one match in 1747. Ashley-Cooper says he "afterwards played for Middlesex". Also played for England in 1759.
Stephen Amherst	Kent	1783–1795	An occasional patron of Kent cricket who was Thomas Boxall's employer.
† William Anderson	London	1745–1753	Mentioned in match reports from 1745 to 1752. It is believed a benefit match was held for him in 1753.
† Andrews	Slindon and Sussex	1744	Played in the London v Slindon match.
Mr Andrews	Sunbury and Surrey	1730	A Surrey patron who challenged the 2nd Duke of Richmond's XI in 1730.
Ashby (aka Ashley)	Coulsdon	1775	Known to have been an amateur. Played against Chertsey in 1775.
Henry Hervey Aston	WCC and Hampshire	1785–1793	Amateur player. He became an army officer, and was killed in a duel in 1798. Recorded in thirteen matches to 1793.
Henry Attfield	Surrey	1773–1789	Also known as "Field".
James Aylward	Hambledon and Hampshire	1773–1797	Noted batsman who had a long career. He made a known record score of 167 in 1777. Later played for Kent.

== B ==
name	club/county	years	notes
† Baker	Hampshire	1777	Recorded in one match in 1777.
Baldwin	Dartford	1775	Recorded as playing in the 1775 London v Dartford match.
† Thomas Baldwin	Chertsey	1764–1775	Active in the 1760s.
Bamford	Nottingham	1771	A member of the Nottingham teams that played Sheffield in 1771 and 1772.
William Barber	Hambledon and Hampshire	1769–1777	Noted bowler, probably fast-medium.
† Barker	Essex	1785	Amateur player. Recorded in four matches to 1793.
† Rev. Charles Bartholomew	Chertsey	1775	One of the Bartholomew family who played in the 1770s, and perhaps earlier.
† Robert Bartholomew	Surrey	1750	Probably part of the cricketing family, he was also an innkeeper.
William Bartholomew	Chertsey and Surrey	1773	A member of the Bartholomew family, recorded in 1773.
† Bartram	Kent	1744	Played for Kent against England.
S. Bartram	Duke of Dorset's XI	1769	Named in Dorset's XI against Wrotham in 1769.
Bassden	London	1775	Recorded as playing in the 1775 London v Dartford match.
James Bayley	Hambledon and Hampshire	1773	Made four known appearances from 1773 to 1783.
John Bayton	Hambledon and Hampshire	1768	Noted batsman of the late 1760s whose career apparently ended in the early 1770s.
† Captain Beak	none	1731	Took part in an early single wicket contest against Lieutenant Coke.
Duke of Bedford	Bedfordshire	1741	A patron who captained his county team.
William Bedle	Dartford and Kent	1709	Bedle's 1768 obituary states that he was the "most expert cricket player in England".
William Bedster	Surrey and Middlesex	1777	Noted batsman who played regularly to 1794. Was at one time the Earl of Tankerville's butler.
Belch	Berkshire	1785	Recorded as playing in the 1785 Berkshire v Essex match.
Billy Beldham	Hampshire and Surrey	1785	One of the greatest players of the pre-roundarm era. Active from 1787 to 1821.
† John Bell	Dartford and Kent	1747	Noted wicket-keeper. Brother of Thomas Bell.
† Thomas Bell	Dartford and Kent	1747	Brother of John Bell. Condemned to death in 1762, but later reprieved.
Bellchambers	Surrey	1768–1769	Recorded in two matches to 1769.
Benick	Coulsdon	1775	Played against Chertsey in 1775.
Little Bennett	London	1744–1755	Brothers who were noted in contemporary reports as two of the best batsmen of their time. In three matches, only "Bennett" is given by the sources, so it is not known which was involved in those matches.
Tall Bennett	London	1744–1755	Brothers who were noted in contemporary reports as two of the best batsmen of their time. In three matches, only "Bennett" is given by the sources, so it is not known which was involved in those matches.
† Berwick	Surrey and Hampshire	1779	Made six known appearances from 1779 to 1780.
Bidewell	Kent	1777	Recorded in one match in 1777.
Birchet	Surrey	1768	Recorded in two matches in 1768.
Birdeye	London	1775	Recorded as playing in the 1775 London v Dartford match.
Bishop	Duke of Dorset's XI	1769	Named in Dorset's XI against Wrotham in 1769.
† Blake	Surrey	1773	Recorded in one match in 1773.
Blake	Caterham	1768	Named in a tentative reference to the Bourne v Caterham match in 1768.
† Boltwood	England	1778	Recorded in one match in 1778.
Henry Bonham	Hampshire	1776–1778	Amateur player; recorded in two matches.
Francis Booker	Kent	1773	Left-handed batsman and noted fielder who played regularly until 1790.
John Boorman	Kent and Essex	1768	Prominent bowler who played in matches till 1793.
John Boots	Sussex	1737	Village cricket player who died during a match after colliding with another player.
George Boult Sr	Berkshire and Middlesex	1785–1795	Amateur player. Recorded in 23 known matches to 1795.
John Bowra	Bromley	1739	Known as the "Kentish Shepherd" and believed to be the father of William Bowra. His name was also spelled "Borah".
William Bowra	Kent and Sussex	1769	Probably the son of John Bowra. Sound middle-order batsman who is believed to have been a good close fielder.
Thomas Brandon	Dartford and Kent	1750	A noted batsman who was mentioned in match reports from 1750 to 1759.
William Brazier	Kent	1774	All-rounder who played in matches from 1774 to 1794, but was absent 1777–1781.
Thomas Brett	Hambledon and Hampshire	1769	Outstanding fast bowler who was acclaimed for his combination of speed and accuracy.
Briggs	Risborough	1775	Recorded as a given man in one match in 1775.
† Broad	Addington and Surrey	1745	Mentioned in match reports from 1745 to 1750.
Brobham	Dartford and Kent	1768	Recorded in one single wicket match in 1768 and a match for Dartford in 1775.
Alan Brodrick	Surrey	1727	A Surrey patron who was partly responsible for drawing up the first known rules of the game.
James Bryant	Bromley and Kent	1744	Brother of John Bryant. One of the best players for the Kent county team and a key member of Bromley Cricket Club.
John Bryant	Bromley and Kent	1743	Brother of James Bryant. One of the best players for the Kent county team and a key member of Bromley Cricket Club.
William Bullen	Kent	1773	Outstanding all-rounder who was prolific until 1800. First bowler ever to be definitely credited with 5 wickets in an innings.
† Burchwood	Dartford and Kent	1759	Noted bowler who played for Dartford in their three 1759 matches.
Burkin	Coulsdon	1775	Played against Chertsey in 1775.
Peter Burrell	Coulsdon & MCC	1777–1790	An occasional patron who was one of the original members of MCC.
† Butler	London	1744	Played in the London v Slindon match.

== C ==
name	club/county	years	notes
† John Capon	London and Surrey	1748	Mentioned in match reports from 1748 to 1755.
† Carpenter	Caterham	1768	Named in a tentative reference to the Bourne v Caterham match in 1768.
† George Carter	London	1748	Recorded four times from 1748 to 1749.
† Thomas Chambers	Middlesex	1731	A Middlesex patron whose team, Thomas Chambers' XI, challenged the 2nd Duke of Richmond's XI in 1731. Chambers was a great-grandfather of Lord Frederick Beauclerk.
Edmund Chapman	Chertsey and Surrey	1726	His 1763 obituary described him as "one of the most dextrous cricket players in England".
† Cheeseman	Sussex	1759	Played in the 1759 Dartford v England tri-series.
† Childs	Surrey	1772	Recorded in nine matches from 1772 to 1774, but believed to have been active long before 1772.
John Chitty	Surrey	1729	The owner of what is now the world's oldest surviving cricket bat (pictured), which is kept in the museum at The Oval.
Robert Clifford	Kent	1777	Prolific all-rounder, especially noted for his slow bowling. Active until 1792.
Clowder	London	1755	Recorded in one single wicket match in 1755.
† Lieutenant Coke	none	1731	Took part in an early single wicket contest against Captain Beak.
† John Colchin	Bromley	1748	Probably Robert Colchin's brother; recorded in 1748 and 1749.
Samuel Colchin	Kent	1773	All-rounder who was active until 1779. Nephew of Robert Colchin.
Robert Colchin	Bromley and Kent	1743	Also known as "Long Robin", a controversial figure who was held to be both the best batter and all-rounder of his time. An outstanding single wicket player, and a very influential match organiser.
† J. Cole	Hampshire	1784	Two known appearances to 1788.
† Tim Coleman	London	1731	Described in a contemporary report as "the famous Tim Coleman".
Coleman	Nottingham	1771	A member of the Nottingham teams that played Sheffield in 1771 and 1772.
† Collier	Kent	1786	Recorded in one match in 1786.
† Collins	Surrey	1744	Mentioned in 1744 and 1748; played for London against Slindon in the earliest match that has a surviving scorecard.
Collishaw	Nottingham	1771	A member of the Nottingham teams that played Sheffield in 1771 and 1772.
† Cook	Brentford	1735	Described by a contemporary reporter as "one of the best bowlers in England".
James Cotton	Hambledon	1773	Recorded as playing for "Hambledon Town" in 1773.
Reynell Cotton	Hambledon	1771	A reverend who was President of the Hambledon Club in 1773 and 1774. Best known for composing the Hambledon Club Song, c. 1771. It is not certain if he was ever a player.
† Couchman	Kent	1783	Made two known appearances to 1786.
Henry Crosoer	Kent	1786	All-rounder recorded until 1790.
John Cutbush	Maidstone and Kent	1743	Rated among "the six best players in England".

== D ==
name	club/county	years	notes
John Dampier	WCC and MCC	1785	Amateur player. Recorded in three matches to 1787.
† Danes	Kent	1744	Played for Kent against England.
† Darville	Berkshire	1740–1748	Apparently Thomas Waymark's employer at Bray Mills in Berkshire. A patron who is recorded playing in three single wicket matches in 1748.
† Davidson	Essex	1784	Three known appearances to 1787.
John Brewer Davis	Kent	1773	Recorded twice in 1773.
† T. Davis	Hambledon and Hampshire	1773	Amateur batsman who made 7 known appearances for Hampshire until 1776.
John Thomas de Burgh	Hambledon and Hampshire	1771–1773	Occasional player in the early 1770s. Became the 13th Earl of Clanricarde.
Stephen Dingate	Reigate, Surrey	1744	Believed to have been a barber by trade, one of the leading single wicket players of the 1740s.
John Sackville, 3rd Duke of Dorset	Kent	1768–1784	A leading patron of Kent cricket, and a useful player in his own right.
† Dunn	London	1735	Evidently a top order batsman who is mentioned in three match reports.
William Durling	Addington and Surrey	1748	Mentioned in match reports from 1748 to 1761.
Dyke	Kent	1785	Known to have been an amateur who took part in two "gentlemen only" matches in 1785.

== E ==
name	club/county	years	notes
Gilbert East	Berkshire	1785	Amateur all-rounder. Recorded in twelve matches to 1794.
John Edmeads	Chertsey and Surrey	1759	Mentioned in match reports until 1779.
† Richard Edmeads	Chertsey	1765	Brother of John Edmeads; recorded in one match in 1765.
† William Edmeads	Surrey	1775	Younger brother of John Edmeads. Recorded in one match in 1775.
Edwards	Kent	1785	Known to have been an amateur who took part in two "gentlemen only" matches in 1785.
† Ellis	London	1735	Described by a contemporary reporter as London's "best bowler".
Mr Ellis	Hampshire & Sussex	1772	A now unknown figure who was mentioned as the subject of a bet about how many runs he might score, in comparison with the Duke of Dorset, in a Kent versus Hampshire & Sussex match.
† Daniel Etheridge	Chertsey	1775	Recorded in three matches in 1775.
Robert Eures	Bexley and Kent	1746–1752	Known to have been a good batsman who played for England teams.

== F ==
name	club/county	years	notes
Faggoter	Chertsey	1775	Played against Coulsdon in 1775.
Tom Faulkner	Addington and Surrey	1744	A prominent single wicket player who is recorded to 1761. Was also a prizefighter who fought under the sobriquet of "Long Tom".
William Fennex	Middlesex	1785	Noted all-rounder and fast bowler whose best years were the 1790s.
† Finch	Kent	1786	Recorded in one match in 1786.
† Jasper Fish	Kent	1769	Recorded in three matches between 1769 and 1777.
Fothers	Essex	1785	Recorded as playing in the 1785 Berkshire v Essex match.
† Foule	Caterham	1768	Recorded as top scorer in one match in 1768.
† Frame	Surrey	1750	John Frame's brother; recorded in three matches in 1750.
John Frame	Dartford and Kent	1749	Arguably the first great fast bowler in cricket history and had a long career from 1749 to at least 1774.
† Francis	Hampshire	1775	Possibly a brother of Richard Francis; recorded in one match in 1775.
Edward Francis	Caterham	1768	Named in a tentative reference to the Bourne v Caterham match in 1768.
Richard Francis	Hambledon and Hampshire	1773	Regular player for Hampshire until 1793.
T. Francis	Caterham	1768	Named in a tentative reference to the Bourne v Caterham match in 1768.
Frederick, Prince of Wales	Surrey	1731–1737	Heir to the throne who became very interested in cricket when he first came to England from Hanover, and was a leading patron for the rest of his life. Ashley-Cooper says he "presided over the London Club".
John Freemantle	Hampshire	1780	Elder brother of Andrew Freemantle. Fast bowler who had a short career to 1782.
† James Fuggles	Kent	1768	Kent batsman who was last recorded in 1773.

== G ==
name	club/county	years	notes
Sir William Gage	Sussex	1725–1734	A leading patron of Sussex cricket. The earliest known mention of him in a cricket connection is via a letter he sent to the 2nd Duke of Richmond in July 1725.
† Garrett	Kent	1750	Recorded in five matches from 1750 to 1751.
† Gascoigne	London	1759	Played in the 1759 Dartford v England tri-series.
† Gibson	Kent	1780	Mentioned in two matches in 1780.
Edward Gill	Buckinghamshire and England	1759–1772	Noted wicket-keeper.
Gladwin	Nottingham	1771	A member of the Nottingham teams that played Sheffield in 1771 and 1772.
Glazier	Hambledon and Hampshire	1769	Recorded as playing in the 1769 Caterham v Hambledon match.
Golding	Bourne	1768	Named in a tentative reference to the Bourne v Caterham match in 1768.
† Goldstone	Dartford and Kent	1759	Played in the 1759 Dartford v England tri-series.
† Goldswain	Essex	1785–1793	Recorded in twelve matches to 1793. Had a number of aliases, but it seems that Goldswain was his actual name.
William Goodwin	Sunbury and Middlesex	1724	Described as "able to play at Cricket with most People". Sunbury had a noted team.
Goulson	Dartford	1775	Recorded as playing in the 1775 London v Dartford match.
† Green	Amberley and Sussex	1744	Recorded in three matches to 1747.
Richard Grenville	Buckinghamshire	1741	A patron who captained his county team.

== H ==
name	club/county	years	notes
Earl of Halifax	Northamptonshire	1741	A patron who captained his county team.
† W. Hall	Hampshire	1782	Recorded in one match in 1782.
Hammond	Dartford	1775	Recorded as playing in the 1775 London v Dartford match.
Stephen Harding	Thursley and Chertsey	1751	Hard-hitting batsman mentioned in match reports from 1751 to 1765.
Joe Harris	Addington and Surrey	1744	Brother of John Harris and recorded until 1756. Made 26 known appearances in single wicket and 15 in matches.
John Harris	Addington and Surrey	1744	Brother of Joe Harris and recorded until 1754. Made 11 known appearances in single wicket and 12 in matches.
David Harris	Hampshire	1782	One of the greatest bowlers of the underarm era. Active to 1798.
Isaac Hatch	Kent	1786	Amateur player; recorded in one match in 1786.
† Hawkins	Hampshire	1786	Amateur batsman recorded in four matches to 1787.
† John Haynes	Surrey	1759	Mentioned in match reports from 1759 to 1761.
† Joseph Hitches	Long Robin's XI	1749	Recorded three times in 1749.
† Hodder	London	1744	Played in the London v Slindon match.
† Hodge	Long Robin's XI	1745	Named ahead of the Long Robin v Newland match.
† Hodges	Kent	1781	Recorded in one match in 1781.
William Hodsoll	Dartford and Kent	1743	An outstanding bowler who was rated among "the six best players in England".
† Hogben	Kent	1781	Made six known appearances in 1781 and 1782.
William Hogsflesh	Hambledon and Hampshire	1769–1775	Noted bowler, probably fast-medium, who played until 1775.
Horne	Hambledon	1773	Recorded as playing for "Hambledon Town" in 1773.
Richard Hosmer	Kent	1777	Amateur batsman. Active until 1791.
† Holness aka Houness	Kent	1777	Recorded in one match in 1777, and in one match in 1781.
† Howard	Kent	1745	Mentioned in match reports from 1745 to 1752.
† Howlett	London	1744	Made two known appearances in 1744 and 1745.
† Humphreys	Surrey	1749	Recorded in two matches in 1749.
Edward Hussey	Kent	1773	A useful batsman who had a long but sporadic career from 1773 to 1797.
Huythwaite	Nottingham	1771	A member of the Nottingham teams that played Sheffield in 1771 and 1772.

== I ==
name	club/county	years	notes
† Irons	England	1778	Recorded as a member of an England team in 1778.

== J ==
name	club/county	years	notes
† George Jackson	Addington and Surrey	1744	Known to have been a good batsman who frequently played in single wicket contests, he is recorded in matches to 1752.
† Jervoise	Croydon and Surrey	1735	A Surrey patron who was active in 1735.
† Jones	Hadlow and Kent	1747	Mentioned in match reports from 1747 to 1749.
Christopher Jones	London	1732	Keeper of the Artillery Ground.
Thomas Jure	London	1747	Mentioned in match reports from 1747 to 1749.

== K ==
name	club/county	years	notes
† Killick	Dartford and Kent	1759	Played in the 1759 Dartford v England tri-series.
† William King	London	1753	Noted as a leading London player in 1753 and 1754.
Kingsmill	Essex	1785	Recorded as playing in the 1785 Berkshire v Essex match.
George Kipps	Sevenoaks and Kent	1744	The sport's first noted wicket-keeper. Completed the earliest-known stumping in 1744.

== L ==
name	club/county	years	notes
Lamborn	Surrey and Hampshire	1777	Spin bowler who was a great innovator. Known as the "Little Farmer".
Squire Thomas Land	Hambledon	1764	Perhaps the original patron of Hambledon cricket. He seems to have left the scene before the club was founded.
John Larkin	Hadlow and Kent	1747	Noted single wicket performer.
† Robert Lascoe	Bromley and Kent	1745	Mentioned in match reports from 1745 to 1748.
Lawrence	Hambledon	1773	Recorded as playing for "Hambledon Town" in 1773.
† Richard Lawrence	Berkshire	1783–1795	Made several appearances in important matches, including single wicket.
George Leer	Hambledon and Hampshire	1769	Middle order batsman who was mainly noted for his fielding.
Colonel Charles Lennox	WCC/MCC	1784–1806	With the Earl of Winchilsea, one of the foremost patrons of cricket in the early years of MCC. Also noted as a good batsman.
M. Lewis (Hambledon)	Hambledon	1773	Recorded as playing for "Hambledon Town" in 1773.
† M. Lewis (Surrey)	Surrey	1773	Amateur who made two known appearances in 1773.
Lintot	Dartford	1775	Recorded as playing in the 1775 London v Dartford match.
† Richard Lipscomb	Chertsey	1775	Recorded in two matches in 1775.
Thomas Lord	Middlesex	1787	Lord opened his original ground at the beginning of the 1787 season and the first record of him as a player is on 31 May 1787 when he played for Middlesex against Essex on his own ground. Marylebone Cricket Club (MCC) was founded soon afterwards and the earliest known match played by an MCC team was at Lord's on 30 July 1787.
George Louch	Kent and Marylebone Cricket Club (MCC)	1773	An occasional patron who was one of the most prolific amateur players, and an outstanding fielder. Strongly associated with Chatham Cricket Club, whose ground was known as "George Louch's field".
Loughman	Nottingham	1771	A member of the Nottingham teams that played Sheffield in 1771 and 1772.
Love	Bourne	1768	Named in a tentative reference to the Bourne v Caterham match in 1768.
James Love	Richmond	1744	A playing member at Richmond but better known as a poet.
† John Lucas	Hambledon	1753	Batsman from Portsmouth, who played for Hambledon against Surrey in the earliest-known match on Broadhalfpenny Down. Scored 82 in the first innings—the second-highest known score to 1769, after Richard Newland's 88 in 1745.

== M ==
name	club/county	years	notes
Mandy	Kent	1768	Recorded in one single wicket match in 1768.
Sir Horatio Mann	Kent	1766–1773	A leading patron of Kent cricket.
† Jacob Mann	Richard Newland's XI	1745	Named ahead of the Long Robin v Newland match.
Noah Mann	Hampshire	1777	Outstanding all-rounder noted for his athleticism. Career ended tragically when he was killed by fire.
† John Mansfield	Sevenoaks and Kent	1747	Batsman noted for single wicket appearances.
† Mansfield	England	1778	Recorded as a member of an England team in 1778.
Charles Spencer, 3rd Duke of Marlborough	London	1737	Patron and team captain.
† Marshall	London	1735	Recorded in one match in 1735.
† J. Martin	Essex	1781	Professional bowler active until 1793.
† Martin	Richard Newland's XI	1745	Named ahead of the Long Robin v Newland match.
† Mathews	England	1751	Recorded in two matches in 1751.
Richard May	Kent	1768	Noted bowler of the 1760s and 1770s. Brother of Thomas May.
Thomas May	Kent	1768	Batsman who played until 1773. Brother of Richard May.
† Maynard	Surrey	1744	Recorded in 12 matches to 1750.
Mew	Nottingham	1771	A member of the Nottingham teams that played Sheffield in 1771 and 1772.
Charles Sackville, Lord Middlesex	Kent	1734	An occasional patron of Kent cricket.
Miller	Caterham	1768	Named in a tentative reference to the Bourne v Caterham match in 1768.
Joseph Miller	Kent	1769	Outstanding batsman who was active till 1783. Some confusion exists re his first name but the majority of sources call him Joseph.
Richard Miller	Surrey	1774	Possibly a brother of Joseph Miller; recorded in one match in 1774.
† John Mills	Horsmonden and Kent	1744	Called the "famous Kent bowler", he played for Kent against England in June 1744, and was later described as one of the best players in the country. No mentions before or after 1744, however.
† Mills	Kent	1744	Played for Kent against England. Believed to have been the brother of John Mills.
† Mills	Surrey	1777	Bowler who was active until 1781.
John Minshull	Kent and Surrey	1769	Scorer of the earliest known century in all forms of cricket, and a noted batsman in the 1760s and 1770s.
Charles Monson	WCC and MCC	1785	Amateur player. Brother of G. H. Monson. Army captain who was recorded in one match in 1785.
George Henry Monson	WCC/MCC	1785–1792	Amateur player. Recorded in ten matches to 1792.
Lord Montfort	London	1743	Patron and team captain who led the combined London, Middlesex & Surrey team in May 1743.
† Muddle	Kent	1768	Recorded in two matches in 1768.
† Muggeridge	Chertsey and Surrey	1774	Bowler who was active until 1784.

== N ==
name	club/county	years	notes
Adam Newland	Slindon	1744	Brother of Richard Newland. Noted member of the Slindon team.
John Newland	Slindon	1740	Brother of Richard Newland. First mentioned in correspondence to Thomas Pelham-Holles, 1st Duke of Newcastle by the 2nd Duke of Richmond as someone "that you must remember".
Richard Newland	Slindon and Sussex	1743	One of the most outstanding players of the sport's pioneering era before the introduction of the pitched delivery. Made the highest known individual score of the period—an innings of 88 in 1745.
Richard Newman	Essex, Kent and MCC	1773	Amateur batsman who was active from 1773 to 1793.
J. Norman	Essex	1785	Recorded as playing in the 1785 Berkshire v Essex match. Norman is known to have been an amateur.
† Norris	London	1744	Made two known appearances in 1744 and 1745.
† Norton	Richard Newland's XI	1745	Named ahead of the Long Robin v Newland match.
† Nyland	Sussex	1759	Played in the 1759 Dartford v England tri-series. There has been speculation that Nyland might have been one of Richard Newland or Richard Nyren.
Richard Nyren	Hambledon and Hampshire	1769–1784	Cricket's earliest known left-hander. An outstanding all-rounder who captained the Hambledon team in its heyday.
John Nyren	Hampshire	1786	Son of Richard Nyren and an occasional player who is better known as the author of The Cricketers of My Time.

== O ==
name	club/county	years	notes
Oakley	Kent	1777	Recorded in one match in 1777.
† George Oldner	London	1736	Appeared in an important single wicket contest in 1736.
Oliver	Duke of Dorset's XI	1769	Named in Dorset's XI against Wrotham in 1769.
Osguthorpe	Sheffield	1771	The only Sheffield player known to have played against Nottingham.
Osmond	Hambledon and Hampshire	1764	A tentative reference connects him with one match in 1764.

== P ==
name	club/county	years	notes
† Page	Chertsey and Surrey	1769	Active till 1773.
Henry Palmer	Coulsdon	1775	Played against Chertsey in 1775. Possibly related to Will Palmer.
Will Palmer	Kent and Surrey	1768	Noted batsman who played in matches to 1776.
Parr	Chatham	1754	Recorded in one single wicket match in 1754.
Thomas Pattenden	Kent	1769	Played in over thirty matches from 1772 to 1783. In some scorecards, he cannot be disambiguated from his brother William.
William Pattenden	Kent	1777	Occasional player to 1781. Younger brother of Thomas Pattenden.
Peachey	WCC and MCC	1785	Amateur player; recorded in two matches in 1785.
† Tom Peake	Chelsfield and Kent	1743	Kent player who was frequently called upon as a given man.
Harry Peckham	Sussex	1771	Occasional player who contributed to the 1774 Laws of Cricket.
† Pennell	Kent	1777	Made five known appearances to 1781.
† Perry	London	1726	Took part in the earliest known single wicket match. Both players were well known as the contemporary report calls them "the noted Perry of London and the famous Piper of Hampton".
† Perry	Surrey	1749	Mentioned in match reports from 1749 to 1755. Has been confused with the 1726 player, who could have been a relation.
Constantine Phillips	Surrey	1773	Made 5 known appearances to 1778.
† Piper	Hampton	1726	Took part in the earliest known single wicket match. Both players were well known as the contemporary report calls them "the noted Perry of London and the famous Piper of Hampton".
† William Piper	Chertsey	1761	Appeared in one match in 1761 as a given man for Chertsey.
† Polden	England	1778	Recorded as a member of an England team in 1778.
† Pool	London	1735	Recorded in one match in 1735.
† Potter	Dartford and Kent	1759	Played in the 1759 Dartford v England tri-series.
Charles Powlett	Hambledon Club	1773	A key benefactor and patron at Hambledon. A member of the Laws committee in 1774.
Richard Purchase	Hambledon and Hampshire	1773	Noted slow bowler who had a long career from 1773 until 1803, though he was absent from 1775 to 1780 inclusive.
Purdy	Hambledon and Hampshire	1769	All were recorded as playing in the 1769 Caterham v Hambledon match.
† Pye	Sussex	1747	Noted single wicket performer.

== Q ==
name	club/county	years	notes
Thomas Quiddington	Chertsey and Surrey	1769	Noted bowler mentioned in reports from 1769 to 1784. His name has also been spelt Quiddenden.

== R ==
name	club/county	years	notes
† Rawlings	Kent	1750	Mentioned in three match reports to 1751.
Rawson	Nottingham	1771	A member of the Nottingham teams that played Sheffield in 1771 and 1772.
† Read	England	1773	Recorded in one match in 1773.
Benjamin Remington aka Rimmington	Kent	1780	One of three brothers who collectively played until 1791. Sources often fail to disambiguate between them.
Michael Remington aka Rimmington	Kent	1781	One of three brothers who collectively played until 1791. Sources often fail to disambiguate between them.
Thomas Remington aka Rimmington	Kent	1780	One of three brothers who collectively played until 1791. Sources often fail to disambiguate between them.
Richardson	Dartford	1775	Recorded as playing in the 1775 London v Dartford match.
Charles Lennox, 1st Duke of Richmond	Sussex	1702	The sport's earliest known leading patron.
Charles Lennox, 2nd Duke of Richmond	Slindon and Sussex	1725–1733	A leading patron of Sussex cricket in general, and of the Slindon club in particular. The earliest known mention of him in a cricket connection is via a letter sent to him by Sir William Gage in July 1725.
Thomas Ridge	Hambledon and Hampshire	1768–1775	Prominent Hambledon Club member who played in a number of matches to 1775.
Thomas Ridgeway	Sussex	1743	Rated among "the six best players in England".
Joey Ring	Kent	1782	Noted batsman who played until 1796.
† Robinson	Tom Faulkner's XI	1749	Recorded three times in 1749.
Roe	Nottingham	1771	A member of the Nottingham teams that played Sheffield in 1771 and 1772.
Val Romney	Sevenoaks and Kent	1743	Noted for his leadership and described by James Love as "a mighty player".
† Stephen Rose	Chertsey	1743	An Army deserter who was reported to be "a famous cricket player".
Henry Rowett	Caterham and Surrey	1767–1769	Patron of Surrey cricket who was chiefly associated with the Caterham club in the 1760s.
† Joseph Rudd	Sussex	1747	Noted single wicket performer.
† J. Russell	Essex	1785	Amateur player; recorded in nine matches to 1793.

== S ==
name	club/county	years	notes
Lord John Sackville	Kent	1734–1744	A leading patron of Kent cricket who was also a noted player.
Earl of Sandwich	Huntingdonshire	1741	A patron who captained his county team.
Sanham	Dartford	1775	Recorded as playing in the 1775 London v Dartford match.
† Saunders	Berkshire	1759	Played in the 1759 Dartford v England tri-series.
William Sawyer	Richmond and Surrey	1743	Rated among "the six best players in England".
Thomas Scott	Hampshire	1784–1798	Specialist batsman who played in at least 29 matches, mainly for Hampshire, and in several for England.
Scuder	Dartford	1775	Recorded as playing in the 1775 London v Dartford match.
† Charles Sears	Chertsey	1761	Played two matches in 1761.
Shearcy	Duke of Dorset's XI	1769	Named in Dorset's XI against Wrotham in 1769.
Shepherd	Caterham and Surrey	1769	All were recorded as playing in the 1769 Caterham v Hambledon match.
Richard Simmons	Kent	1768	One of the earliest well-known wicket-keepers. Active till 1779.
† T. Skinner	Hampshire	1781	Recorded in one match in 1781.
† C. Slater	Berkshire	1785	Amateur player; recorded in four matches to 1787.
† Smailes	Caterham	1768	Recorded in two matches from 1768 to 1769.
Jack Small	Hampshire	1784	Son of John Small and close friend of John Nyren. A sound batsman but overshadowed by his father.
John Small	Hambledon and Hampshire	1768–1798	Described by John Nyren as "a star of the first magnitude", master batsman John Small is buried in St Peter's churchyard (pictured) in his home village of Petersfield.
Smith	Kent	1785	Known to have been an amateur who took part in two "gentlemen only" matches in 1785.
George Smith	London	1740	Best known as the groundskeeper of the Artillery Ground. He was also a publican, and was the landlord of the Pyed Horse, which adjoined the Artillery Ground in Chiswell Street, Finsbury. Although he was an occasional player in matches, he received more publicity for his financial problems, and his battles against bankruptcy.
† Thomas Southam	Long Robin's XI	1749	Recorded three times in 1749.
Spriggs	Berkshire	1785	Recorded as playing in the 1785 Berkshire v Essex match.
Spurr	Nottingham	1771	A member of the Nottingham teams that played Sheffield in 1771 and 1772.
Richard Stanford	Kent	1777	Amateur batsman. Active until 1787.
Edwin Stead	Kent	1724	A leading patron of Kent cricket who died young in 1735.
† Stephens/Stevens	Dartford	1751–1759	Mentioned in match reports from 1751 to 1759.
Stevens	Surrey	1744	Two players called Stevens were due to play in the London v Slindon match on 2 June 1744, but did not take part. They are not mentioned in other sources.
Lumpy Stevens	Chertsey and Surrey	1769	One of the greatest bowlers of the underarm era. Had a long career from c. 1756 to 1789.
Peter Stewart	Hambledon and Hampshire	1764–1779	Nicknamed "Buck", a humorist who was a Hambledon mainstay through the club's formative period.
Stocks	Nottingham	1771	A member of the Nottingham teams that played Sheffield in 1771 and 1772.
† Stone	Kent	1751	Recorded in two matches in 1751.
Robert Stone	Surrey	1773	Amateur batsman who played eight times until 1780. May have reappeared in 1790, if the same man.
Lord Strathavon	WCC and MCC	1785	Amateur player. Recorded in three matches to 1792.
Tom Sueter	Hambledon and Hampshire	1769–1790	Outstanding wicket-keeper-batsman, especially noted for his front foot play.
Thomas Swayne	Chertsey	1775	Made three recorded appearances to 1778.

== T ==
name	club/county	years	notes
Earl of Tankerville	Surrey	1773–1781	A leading patron of Surrey cricket who employed Lumpy Stevens as a gardener. Recorded in 29 known matches.
George Talbot	WCC and MCC	1784–1791	Amateur player. Recorded in over twenty known matches to 1791.
Tom Taylor	Hampshire	1775	Outstanding all-rounder, especially noted for the cut shot and brilliant fielding.
Terry	Dartford	1775	Recorded as playing in the 1775 London v Dartford match.
† Thompson	Berkshire	1783–1794	Mainly a Berkshire player, but he also appeared twice for the Gentlemen of Kent in 1785.
† Townsend	Kent	1777	Recorded in seven matches to 1786.
Troop	Nottingham	1771	A member of the Nottingham teams that played Sheffield in 1771 and 1772.
Turner	Nottingham	1771	A member of the Nottingham teams that played Sheffield in 1771 and 1772.
Twinker	Caterham	1768	Named in a tentative reference to the Bourne v Caterham match in 1768.
† Tyson	WCC and MCC	1785	Amateur player; recorded in seven matches to 1794.

== V ==
name	club/county	years	notes
Richard Aubrey Veck	Hampshire	1776–1784	Noted batsman who was a Hampshire regular until 1784 when he quit the game for, apparently, business reasons.
Henry Venn	England or Surrey	1747	Played cricket at the University of Cambridge until he was ordained in June 1747. His biographer says he played in an England v Surrey match shortly beforehand. Venn was said to have been "a good batsman".

== W ==
name	club/county	years	notes
† Wakeland	London	1735	Made two known appearances in single wicket contests.
† Wakelin	Dartford and Kent	1759	Played in the 1759 Dartford v England tri-series.
Walker	London	1748	Recorded in one single wicket match in 1748.
Harry Walker	Hampshire and Surrey	1784	Brother of Tom Walker. He was a regular player until 1802. Batsman who was noted for his use of the cut shot.
Tom Walker	Hampshire and Surrey	1786	Outstanding all-rounder who was noted for his determined, defensive batting. Known as "Old Everlasting", he was a leading player until he retired in 1810.
† Waller	Kent	1774	Recorded in two matches in 1774.
Ward	Bourne	1768	Named in a tentative reference to the Bourne v Caterham match in 1768.
Warren	London	1775	Recorded as playing in the 1775 London v Dartford match.
Thomas Waymark	Sussex and Berkshire	1727	Accounted the first great all-rounder, Waymark played for over 20 years and was noted for his "extraordinary agility and dexterity".
† Webb	Kent	1781	Made five known appearances in 1781.
James Wells	Surrey	1783	Brother of the more famous John Wells. Made over twenty known appearances to 1800.
Wessing	Caterham and Surrey	1769	All were recorded as playing in the 1769 Caterham v Hambledon match.
† Wheatley	London	1735	Evidently a top order batsman, known to have been a distiller by trade.
† John Wheeler	Kent	1773	Made two known appearances in 1773 and 1775.
† Shock White	Brentford	1761	Definitely active between 1761 and 1773, but he has been confused with Thomas "Daddy" White.
Thomas White	Chertsey and Surrey	1771	Noted all-rounder who instigated the Monster Bat Controversy. Retired in 1779.
† R. Whitehead	WCC and MCC	1785	An occasional patron, and an original member of MCC.
Whitting	Duke of Dorset's XI	1769	Named in Dorset's XI against Wrotham in 1769.
† Wilden	Kent	1751	Recorded in two matches in 1751.
Willard	Kent	1785	Known to have been an amateur who took part in two "gentlemen only" matches in 1785.
Wilmot	Kent	1785	Known to have been an amateur who took part in two "gentlemen only" matches in 1785.
Earl of Winchilsea	WCC/MCC	1784–1804	With Col. Charles Lennox, one of the foremost patrons of cricket in the early years of MCC. Also noted as a good batsman. Made an estimated 133 appearances in important matches.
John Wood (Kent)	Kent	1769–1783	Noted bowler whom Nyren regarded as among the best of Hampshire's opponents. Sources have often failed to disambiguate him from John Wood of Surrey.
John Wood (Surrey)	Surrey	1769–1784	Noted all-rounder. Sources have often failed to disambiguate him from John Wood of Kent, and S&B always calls him Thomas Wood.
† Wood	Woodcot, Surrey	1735	Mentioned briefly in a 1735 report. There were apparently two Woods of Woodcot.
† Thomas Woods	Chertsey and Surrey	1759–1761	The only definite reference is in 1761, but he probably played in 1759 for England. There is confusion in sources with other players named "Woods", "John Wood", and "Thomas Wood".
Edward Woolgar	Hambledon and Hampshire	1764	A tentative reference connects him with one match in 1764.
John Woolgar	Hambledon and Hampshire	1764	A tentative reference connects him with one match in 1764.
† J. Wyatt	Essex	1785	Amateur player; recorded in seven matches to 1787.

== Y ==
name	club/county	years	notes
William Yalden	Chertsey and Surrey	1772	Outstanding wicket-keeper-batsman. Made at least fifty known appearances to 1783.

== Bibliography ==
- ACS (1981). A Guide to Important Cricket Matches Played in the British Isles 1709–1863. Nottingham: ACS. OCLC 85045528.
- Arlott, John (1984). Arlott on Cricket. London: Harper Collins. ISBN 978-00-02180-82-5.
- Ashley-Cooper, F. S. (1924). Hambledon Cricket Chronicle: 1772–1796. London: Jenkins. OCLC 38498574.
- Ashley-Cooper, F. S. (1929). Kent Cricket Matches, 1719–1880. Canterbury: Gibbs & Sons. OCLC 220674085.
- Bowen, Rowland (1970). Cricket: A History of its Growth and Development. London: Eyre & Spottiswoode. ISBN 978-04-13278-60-9.
- Buckley, G. B. (1935). Fresh Light on 18th Century Cricket. Birmingham: Cotterell & Co. OCLC 23450280.
- Buckley, G. B. (1937). Fresh Light on pre-Victorian Cricket. Birmingham: Cotterell & Co. OCLC 23469107.
- Haygarth, Arthur (1996) [1862]. Scores & Biographies, Volume 1 (1744–1826). Kennington: Frederick Lillywhite. ISBN 978-19-00592-23-9.
- Major, John (2007). More Than A Game. London: HarperCollins. ISBN 978-00-07183-64-7 – via Internet Archive.
- Maun, Ian (2009). From Commons to Lord's, Volume One: 1700 to 1750. Cambridge: Roger Heavens. ISBN 978-19-00592-52-9.
- Maun, Ian (2011). From Commons to Lord's, Volume Two: 1751 to 1770. Leicester: Martin Wilson. ISBN 978-09-56906-60-1.
- McCann, Tim (2004). Sussex Cricket in the Eighteenth Century (PDF). Vol. 88. Lewes: West Sussex Record Office. ISBN 978-08-54450-55-8.
- Mote, Ashley (1997). The Glory Days of Cricket. Robson. ISBN 978-18-61051-11-0.
- Nyren, John (1998) [1832]. Mote, Ashley (ed.). The Cricketers of my Time. London: Robson Publishing. ISBN 978-18-61051-68-4.
- Waghorn, H. T. (1899). Cricket Scores, Notes, &c. From 1730–1773. Edinburgh: Blackwood. OCLC 1086375331.
- Waghorn, H. T. (2005) [1906]. The Dawn of Cricket. London: J. W. McKenzie. ISBN 978-09-47821-17-3.
