= Alphabetical cricket teams =

Between 1786 and 1833, eight matches were played by teams which were apparently selected alphabetically, though not always by design. For example, a match might have players with surnames beginning A to K on one team and players with surnames beginning L to Z on the other. It is possible that other similar matches were played to c.1825 but, if so, the records have not survived. The idea has not been repeated at level since 1833.

== 1786 ==
In August 1786, a match at Moulsey Hurst was played between teams from Hampshire (organised by the Hambledon Club) and Kent, the venue in Surrey being neutral. The main source for the match is Arthur Haygarth's Scores & Biographies (S&B). Haygarth reports a curiosity in that Kent "consisted entirely of A's, B's and C's" and he says that, "in another account" (possibly Grand Matches of Cricket 1771 to 1791 by W. Epps), "the two teams are called A, B and C's v. the rest of the Alphabet". Haygarth, who often complained in S&B about inconsistent titling of matches, adds that the Hambledon Club's Old Scores scorebook calls the match "Earl of Winchilsea's Side" versus "Sir Horace (Horatio) Mann's Side" but he rejects this and states that "it is decidedly a match between Hambledon Club (Hampshire) and Kent". His title is "Hambledon Club, with Lumpy versus Kent, with Bedster". In its Important Matches guide, the Association of Cricket Statisticians and Historians (ACS) calls the match "ABC v Rest of Alphabet".

Haygarth is not entirely correct in his analysis of the two teams because Hambledon included four players from elsewhere and Kent two. Lumpy Stevens of Chertsey and Surrey was, as Haygarth says, a "given man" on the Hambledon/Hampshire side but, in addition, the team included Earl of Winchilsea (White Conduit Club), Edward Hussey (Kent) and William Fennex (Middlesex). The other seven players were all Hambledon men: John Small, Harry Walker, Tom Walker, Tom Taylor, Noah Mann, Richard Purchase and David Harris. On the Kent side, the given man was William Bedster who, like Stevens, was employed by the Earl of Tankerville and played for Chertsey and Surrey. Kent included George T. Boult of Berkshire and, later, Middlesex. The other nine were usually associated with Kent: Stephen Amherst, James Aylward (though he played for Hampshire until 1779), Francis Booker, John Boorman, William Bowra, William Brazier, William Bullen, Robert Clifford and Henry Crozoer.

== 1787 to 1789 ==
Teams called "A to M" and "N to Z" played each other five times in three seasons from 1787. The main secondary source for the five matches is again S&B which calls the two teams "Earl of Winchilsea's Side" and "Sir Horace (Horatio) Mann's Side". There is nothing in S&B to suggest that the teams were organised alphabetically. Furthermore, the so-called "A to M" teams included Tom Taylor and the "N to Z" included James Aylward and William Fennex. CA claims that these were given men and also that the two patrons evidently alternated between the teams, which would put Winchilsea into "A to M" and Mann into "N to Z". The S&B version is supported by the ACS.

== 1831 to 1833 ==
Two A to K versus L to Z matches were played in 1831 and 1833. These were genuine alphabetical matches. They were both played at Lord's by teams of Marylebone Cricket Club (MCC) members supplemented by leading professionals including Jem Broadbridge, William Lillywhite, Fuller Pilch and Ned Wenman. The 1833 match was 12-a-side.

== Bibliography ==
- ACS (1981). A Guide to Important Cricket Matches Played in the British Isles 1709–1863. Nottingham: ACS.
- Buckley, G. B. (1935). Fresh Light on 18th Century Cricket. Cotterell.
- Haygarth, Arthur (1862). Scores & Biographies, Volume 1 (1744–1826). Lillywhite.
- Haygarth, Arthur (1862). Scores & Biographies, Volume 2 (1827–1840). Lillywhite.
