= 1786 English cricket season =

Cricket season review

The famous Walker brothers made their first senior appearances in the 1786 English cricket season and the rare dismissal of hit the ball twice was first recorded. Details of fourteen historically important matches are known. (Note: Any match listed in the ACS' Important Match Guide (1981) is historically important, and therefore of the highest standard, whether or not a scorecard might exist. The same applies to numerous matches discovered by researchers since 1981. For further information, see First-class cricket.)

== White Conduit ==
White Conduit Club (WCC) played Kent twice in 1786. The first match in June was on White Conduit Fields, and WCC won by 5 runs.

The second match in August was at Bishopsbourne Paddock, and WCC won by 164 runs. They batted first and scored 183 all out with Tom Walker on 95 not out. If the batting order in the scorecard is correct, he carried his bat as he opened the innings. Kent replied with 218 to take a first innings lead of 35. In their second innings, WCC scored 296. This time, Walker did make a century, and so he was very close to becoming the first batsman ever to score two centuries in a match. He made 102, and his Hampshire team-mate Tom Taylor scored 117. Kent needed 262 to win, but WCC also had Lumpy Stevens and David Harris in their team. Kent were bowled out for 97.

The centuries by Taylor and Walker are the first known instance of two players scoring centuries in the same match, let alone the same innings. They were the third and fourth centuries scored in important matches, following the previous hundreds by John Small and James Aylward, who were both playing in this game.

Arthur Haygarth commented: "There are only a few recorded matches of the White Conduit Club. The Marylebone Club was formed in 1787 from its members".

== Hampshire v Kent ==
Hampshire and Kent met three times. In June, Kent won by 4 wickets on Sevenoaks Vine. This is the first match known to feature the brothers Harry and Tom Walker. In Hampshire's first innings of 143, Tom scored 43, and Harry scored 39. To win the match, Kent made 110/6, of which Joey Ring scored 61 not out.

There was a return match in July on Windmill Down, and Hampshire won by 1 wicket. Tom Sueter of Hampshire was given out for hitting the ball twice, the first recorded instance of this type of dismissal. There were four half-centuries in the match, scored by Francis Booker (55*), James Aylward (53), Harry Walker (66), and Tom Walker (55).

A deciding match was played 2 to 5 August on Moulsey Hurst. Hampshire, who were 27 down on first innings, won by 35 runs. Tom Taylor, who was not a wicketkeeper, took six catches in the match.

== Single wicket ==
Six of Hambledon played against Six of Kent between 6 and 9 September on Bishopsbourne Paddock. Kent won by 1 wicket.

== Other events ==
In September, Berkshire played a combined Buckinghamshire & Middlesex team at Warfield. Several good players were involved, such as William Bedster, William Fennex, and George Boult Sr. The result is unknown.

H. T. Waghorn's Dawn of Cricket in 1786 has games involving the Farnham and Warfield teams. It is known that these teams were often augmented by given men like Lumpy Stevens and David Harris, but it has to be assumed that these are parish matches only, the same applying to the Guildford and Godalming teams which also appear in Waghorn's book. While some brief details of the matches are known, the results are usually not. An exception to that is when Farnham and Warfield played each other on Holt Pound in June, as Farnham won by 7 wickets.

== First mentions ==
=== Clubs and teams ===
- Buckinghamshire & Middlesex
- Warfield

=== Players ===
- Henry Crosoer (Kent)
- Isaac Hatch (Kent)
- Hawkins (Hampshire)
- John Nyren (Hampshire)
- Townsend (Hampshire)
- Tom Walker (Hampshire)

== Bibliography ==
- ACS (1981). A Guide to Important Cricket Matches Played in the British Isles 1709–1863. Nottingham: ACS. OCLC 85045528.
- Haygarth, Arthur (1996) [1862]. Scores & Biographies, Volume 1 (1744–1826). Kennington: Frederick Lillywhite. ISBN 978-19-00592-23-9.
- Waghorn, H. T. (2005) [1906]. The Dawn of Cricket. London: J. W. McKenzie. ISBN 978-09-47821-17-3.
