= 1785 English cricket season =

Cricket season review

Arthur Haygarth bemoaned a lack of fixtures in the 1785 English cricket season although there were actually no less than in the previous few seasons. There is a historical significance in that state of affairs because it reflected the decline of the Hambledon Club's influence, while the emergence of the White Conduit Club foreshadowed a shift in focus by the cricket authorities from rural to metropolitan. Details of several historically important matches are known. (Note: Any match listed in the ACS' Important Match Guide (1981) is historically important, and therefore of the highest standard, whether or not a scorecard might exist. The same applies to numerous matches discovered by researchers since 1981. For further information, see First-class cricket.)

== White Conduit ==
The first match definitely known to involve a team representing White Conduit Club took place 30 June and 1 July against the Gentlemen of Kent on White Conduit Fields. Although they were "gentlemen only" teams, most of the players were quite well-known. White Conduit won by 304 runs.

== County matches ==
There were three inter-county matches of a good standard. All involved Essex, who played Middlesex (twice) and Berkshire. The first Middlesex v Essex match was in May on Kennington Common, for £500 a side. Middlesex had George Boult Sr and William Fennex as given men. Essex won by 6 wickets.

Essex met Berkshire in June on Datchet Common. Berkshire won by 148 runs. The return match against Middlesex was also in June, at Langton Park, in Hornchurch. The stake was 100 guineas, but the result is unknown.

== Other events ==
There were several games involving minor counties and town clubs.

Farnham played Petworth three times, winning them all. Perhaps more ambitiously, Farnham also played Alresford, and lost by 5 wickets. Towards the end of the season, Farnham had two matches against Hambledon. The first was on Holt Pound, where Hambledon won by an innings and 119 runs. The result of the second match, on Windmill Down, is unknown.

Buckinghamshire defeated Hertfordshire by 16 runs at Nottis Green, in Beaconsfield. Later, Buckinghamshire met Berkshire and lost by 215 runs.

== First mentions ==
=== Players ===
- Henry Hervey Aston (WCC/Hampshire)
- Barker (Essex; amateur)
- Billy Beldham—first definite appearance
- George Boult Sr (Berkshire)
- John Dampier (WCC; amateur)
- Gilbert East (Berkshire)
- William Fennex (Middlesex)
- J. Russell (Essex; amateur)
- Tyson (WCC/MCC; amateur)

== Bibliography ==
- ACS (1981). A Guide to Important Cricket Matches Played in the British Isles 1709–1863. Nottingham: ACS. OCLC 85045528.
- Buckley, G. B. (1935). Fresh Light on 18th Century Cricket. Birmingham: Cotterell & Co. OCLC 23450280.
- Haygarth, Arthur (1996) [1862]. Scores & Biographies, Volume 1 (1744–1826). Kennington: Frederick Lillywhite. ISBN 978-19-00592-23-9.
- McCann, Tim (2004). Sussex Cricket in the Eighteenth Century (PDF). Vol. 88. Lewes: West Sussex Record Office. ISBN 978-08-54450-55-8.
- Waghorn, H. T. (2005) [1906]. The Dawn of Cricket. London: J. W. McKenzie. ISBN 978-09-47821-17-3.
