= 1793 English cricket season =

Cricket season review

In the 1793 English cricket season, Surrey defeated England three times. Details of 20 historically important eleven-a-side matches are known. (Note: Any match listed in the ACS' Important Match Guide (1981) is historically important, and therefore of the highest standard, whether or not a scorecard might exist. The same applies to numerous matches discovered by researchers since 1981. For further information, see First-class cricket.)

== Berkshire ==
The secondary sources are sometimes confusing on the subject of the Maidenhead Cricket Club, based at Bray, near Maidenhead in Berkshire. The team featured in several major matches during the late 18th century, and was important at this time as it had a high playing standard with numerous recognised players. The team has sometimes been referred to as the "Oldfield club", not as Maidenhead, which presented itself as representative of Berkshire in the same way as Hornchurch/Essex and Brighton/Sussex, so its team might be styled Berkshire.

There were two matches between MCC and Berkshire in 1793. The first, at Lord's Old Ground (Lord's), ended in a win for Berkshire by 119 runs. To further the confusion, S&B called it MCC v The Oldfield Club. The ACS Guide says the game should be called MCC v Maidenhead. The Maidenhead club played its matches at the Old Field ground, in Bray, which was the cause of the confusion. Berkshire had a high standard at this time. The second match was on the Old Field, and Berkshire won by 85 runs.

== Sussex v Kent ==
These teams played each other in Brighton (unknown venue) at the end of August. H. T. Waghorn found only bare details of the game, and recorded it as "a grand match of cricket". It was between 9 of Kent with Ring and Beldham, against 9 of Sussex with Scott (i.e., of Hambledon) and another (unknown), for 500 guineas. Kent won by an unknown margin. Waghorn called Beldham "Baldam"

== MCC matches ==
In May, Marylebone Cricket Club (MCC) defeated Middlesex by 54 runs at Lord's Old Ground (Lord's) by 54 runs, and Essex by an innings and 10 runs at Langton Park.

MCC played five matches in June. These were against Essex and Kent. They lost twice to Essex, and lost one and won two against Kent.

== Bibliography ==
- ACS (1981). A Guide to Important Cricket Matches Played in the British Isles 1709–1863. Nottingham: ACS. OCLC 85045528.
- Haygarth, Arthur (1996) [1862]. Scores & Biographies, Volume 1 (1744–1826). Kennington: Frederick Lillywhite. ISBN 978-19-00592-23-9.
- Waghorn, H. T. (2005) [1906]. The Dawn of Cricket. London: J. W. McKenzie. ISBN 978-09-47821-17-3.
