= 1782 English cricket season =

Cricket season review

Having abandoned Broadhalfpenny Down, the Hambledon Club moved to Windmill Down as their new home venue ahead of the 1782 English cricket season. The great fast bowler David Harris made his first known appearance in an important match. Details of thirteen historically important eleven-a-side matches are known. (Note: Any match listed in the ACS' Important Match Guide (1981) is historically important, and therefore of the highest standard, whether or not a scorecard might exist. The same applies to numerous matches discovered by researchers since 1981. For further information, see First-class cricket.)

== Hampshire matches ==
Hampshire played Alresford & Odiham twice, on 27 May at Odiham Down, and on 25 June at an unknown venue; neither result is known. The team was named in a Hampshire Chronicle notice as 'the County of Southampton'. On Tuesday, 18 June, the Hampshire Chronicle reported the Hambledon Club's first meeting on Windmill Down, referring to the ground as 'a field called the New Broad Halfpenny adjoining to the Town of Hambledon'. On Monday, 1 July, the Salisbury Journal recorded Richard Nyren as returning thanks to the public 'for the many favours he has received during the last twenty years'.

Hampshire played Kent twice. The first match was from 3 to 5 July on Sevenoaks Vine. Kent won by 4 wickets. The game saw the first appearances in important matches of David Harris for Hampshire, and "Little" Joey Ring for Kent. The return match was played 11 to 13, and 15 July on Itchin Stoke Down, Kent winning by 142 runs. The game was finished on Monday, 15 July, owing to bad weather, as play on the Saturday (13th) had been washed out.

On 25 and 26 July, Hampshire defeated England by 9 runs at Bishopsbourne Paddock. The return, played from 8 to 10 August, was on Windmill Down, the first recorded match which the Hambledon Club had organised at its new venue. England won by 147 runs.

Hampshire played Sussex on 5 September at Windmill Down, but the result is unknown. This match was pre-announced in the Hampshire Chronicle on Monday, 26 August, with a further notice in the Hambledon Club minutes on the day of the game.

== Single wicket ==
Six of Hambledon played against Six of Kent between 28 and 30 August on Moulsey Hurst. Hambledon won by 47 runs. Haygarth questioned why the Duke of Dorset played for Hambledon against his own county but, as Dorset was a good player, he may have been a given man. His rival, Sir Horatio Mann, did play for Kent, however, and there may have been an agreement that they should be the team captains.

== White Conduit Club ==
White Conduit Club (WCC) was probably formed in 1782. Its name related to White Conduit House, a leisure retreat in Islington, then remote from London. Part of the surrounding White Conduit Fields had been a cricket venue since the early 18th century. Pelham Warner said WCC was an "offshoot" from a social club called Je ne sais quoi, which was based in the West End of London.

== Other events ==
Odiham and Farnham played each other twice in August, each team winning once. Maidenhead defeated Chertsey by 6 wickets in September. Berkshire hosted Odiham at Old Field, Bray on 3 October, but the result is unknown. Four days later, Odiham defeated 'the Berkshire Club' (probably Maidenhead) on Odiham Down.

The 1781 fall-out between the Leicester and Nottingham clubs had dragged on, and was still unresolved by the end of the 1782 season.

== First mentions ==
=== Clubs and teams ===
- Alresford & Odiham
- Farnham Cricket Club

=== Players ===
- David Harris (Hampshire)
- Joey Ring (Kent)

=== Venues ===
- Windmill Down

== Bibliography ==
- ACS (1981). A Guide to Important Cricket Matches Played in the British Isles 1709–1863. Nottingham: ACS. OCLC 85045528.
- Buckley, G. B. (1935). Fresh Light on 18th Century Cricket. Birmingham: Cotterell & Co. OCLC 23450280.
- Haygarth, Arthur (1996) [1862]. Scores & Biographies, Volume 1 (1744–1826). Kennington: Frederick Lillywhite. ISBN 978-19-00592-23-9.
- McCann, Tim (2004). Sussex Cricket in the Eighteenth Century (PDF). Vol. 88. Lewes: West Sussex Record Office. ISBN 978-08-54450-55-8.
- Waghorn, H. T. (2005) [1906]. The Dawn of Cricket. London: J. W. McKenzie. ISBN 978-09-47821-17-3.
- Warner, Pelham (1946). Lords: 1787–1945. London: Harrap. OCLC 877106024.
