= George Dupuis =

English minister and cricketer

The Reverend George Dupuis (1757 – 5 March 1839) was an English minister who was active as a cricketer in the 1780s and 1790s, making five known appearances in important matches. His batting and bowling styles are unknown.

Dupuis is first recorded playing for Hornchurch against Moulsey Hurst Cricket Club at Moulsey Hurst in July 1787. In August of the same year, he was in the Hornchurch/Essex team for the return match at Langton Park, in which Moulsey Hurst combined with the White Conduit Club (WCC; the match has also been titled "Essex v WCC"). No scorecard has survived although the teams and the result are known. It is in this teamsheet that Dupuis is termed The Reverend Mr Dupuis.

He played in two successive matches at Lord's Old Ground in May and June 1791, first for an Old Etonians cricket team (having been educated at Eton College) against the Gentlemen of England; secondly for Marylebone Cricket Club (MCC) against the Gentlemen of Kent (this game being Lord Frederick Beauclerk's debut at Lord's). In August 1792, Dupuis made his last known appearance for MCC against Berkshire at the Old Field ground.

== Bibliography ==
- Britcher, Samuel (1790). A list of all the principal Matches of Cricket that have been played (1790 to 1805). MCC.
- Buckley, G. B. (1935). Fresh Light on 18th Century Cricket. Cotterell.
- Haygarth, Arthur (1862). Scores & Biographies, Volume 1 (1744–1826). Lillywhite. ISBN 1-900592-23-1.
- Waghorn, H. T. (1906). The Dawn of Cricket. Electric Press.
