= 1787 in sports =

1787 in sports describes the year's events in world sport.

== Boxing ==
Events

- 18 January — the vacant Championship of England title was claimed by Tom Johnson following a win over William Warr at Oakingham in a 1 hour 20 minute fight or 1 hour 40 minute fight depending on the source. Johnson was then unbeaten in six known fights since 1783 and retained the title until 1791.
- June 1786 or 5 July, depending on source — Tom Johnson defended his title against William Fry at Kingston upon Thames, winning in 30 minutes or less depending on source.
- 19 December — Tom Johnson defended his title against Michael Ryan at Wradsbury, winning in 24 to 30 minutes or less depending on source.
- Tom Tyne defeated the former champion George Meggs twice, but the fight locations are unknown.

== Cricket ==
Events

- 21 May — opening of the original Lord's ground in Marylebone for the White Conduit Club (WCC) v Middlesex match
- Marylebone Cricket Club (MCC) established at Lord's, chiefly by WCC members

England

- Most runs – James Aylward 296
- Most wickets – David Harris 29

== Horse racing ==
England

- The Derby – Sir Peter Teazle
- The Oaks – Annette
- St Leger Stakes – Spadille
