= 1807 English cricket season =

Cricket season review

The 1807 English cricket season was the 21st since the foundation of Marylebone Cricket Club (MCC). John Willes of Kent first tried to revive the idea of "straight-armed" (i.e., roundarm) bowling, which had originated with Tom Walker in the 1790s. Details of seven historically important eleven-a-side matches are known. (Note: Any match listed in the ACS' Important Match Guide (1981) is historically important, and therefore of the highest standard, whether or not a scorecard might exist. The same applies to numerous matches discovered by researchers since 1981. For further information, see First-class cricket.)

== Events ==
- John Willes of Kent first tried to revive the idea of "straight-armed" (i.e., roundarm) bowling, which had originated with Tom Walker in the 1790s.
- With the Napoleonic War continuing, loss of investment and manpower impacted cricket and only seven matches have been recorded in 1807:
  - 18–19 May: Marylebone Cricket Club (MCC) v Middlesex @ Lord's Old Ground
  - 25–26 May: England v Hampshire @ Lord's Old Ground
  - 2–3 June: MCC v England @ Lord's Old Ground
  - 15–16 June: England v Hampshire @ Lord's Old Ground
  - 22–24 June: Lord F Beauclerk's XI v T Mellish's XI @ Lord's Old Ground
  - 29–30 June: England v Surrey @ Lord's Old Ground
  - 13 July: England v Surrey @ Lord's Old Ground

== Bibliography ==
- ACS (1981). A Guide to Important Cricket Matches Played in the British Isles 1709–1863. Nottingham: ACS. OCLC 85045528.
- Haygarth, Arthur (1996) [1862]. Scores & Biographies, Volume 1 (1744–1826). Kennington: Frederick Lillywhite. ISBN 978-19-00592-23-9.
- Warner, Pelham (1946). Lords: 1787–1945. London: Harrap. OCLC 877106024.
