= 1748 English cricket season =

Cricket season review

The 1748 English cricket season saw the peak of single wicket cricket, never so popular before or since. A total of 18 significant single wicket matches are in the records, compared with just six eleven-a-side games. All the known matches have historically importance. (Note: Any match listed in the ACS' Important Match Guide (1981) is historically important, and therefore of the highest standard, whether or not a scorecard might exist. The same applies to numerous matches discovered by researchers since 1981. For further information, see First-class cricket.)

== Single wicket matches ==
1748 was the year of single wicket cricket, and numerous matches were organised from June to September.

=== June ===
On an unknown date early in the month, Tom Faulkner defeated Robert Colchin by one wicket. Colchin scored 40 and 5; Faulkner scored 45 and 1*. It was played on Bromley Common.

A "fives" game on Monday, 5 June took place on the Artillery Ground between Addington and The Rest, excluding Kent. Addington's players were Tom Faulkner, Joe Harris, John Harris, George Jackson, and William Durling (described as "the shoemaker that lately came out of Kent"). Their opponents were Stephen Dingate, Little Bennett, Maynard, Collins, and Thomas Waymark. This appears to be the first time that a team specifically called "The Rest" was ever assembled.

Three "servants of the Duke of Richmond" played Three of London at the Artillery Ground on Friday, 24 June. The result is unknown but the match started quite late at four o'clock. Richmond's team was Stephen Dingate, Joseph Rudd, and Pye; London's three were Little and Tall Bennett, and William Anderson. The match was reported in the London Evening Post on Saturday, 25 June.

On Saturday, 25 June a return match between Colchin and Faulkner took place on Addington Hill. This time Colchin won by 2 runs. He made 7 and 12; Faulkner replied with 11 and 6.

=== July ===
A third game between Colchin and Faulkner, "each having previously won one", was held on the Artillery Ground, Monday 4 July. Unfortunately, there are no match details this time. On the same day, also on the Artillery Ground, Thomas Waymark and Darville played as Two of Berkshire against Little Bennett and George Smith of London. Smith was allowed an unnamed substitute in the field. Waymark and Darville won. Darville was the owner of Bray Mills, where Waymark worked at this time. Smith, apparently having resolved his financial problems, was still the landlord of the famous Py'd Horse and keeper of the Artillery Ground.

A "fives" match was played Wednesday, 6 July on the Artillery Ground. Tom Faulkner's Side beat Stephen Dingate's Side by one wicket. Two runs were required when the last man went in. The teams were: Tom Faulkner, Joe Harris, William Anderson, and Little and Tall Bennett versus Stephen Dingate, Joseph Rudd, Pye, James Bryant, and John Bryant.

The same two teams of "fives" met again from Wednesday, 13 to Friday, 15 July. This match was also on the Artillery Ground. Play was interrupted by rain on the Wednesday after one team had completed its first innings, scoring 13. The match continued on the Friday. No further details are known but, as an apparent "decider" was played on Wednesday, 27 July, perhaps Dingate's team won this one.

On Wednesday, 27 July, there was another "fives" game between the Faulkner and Dingate teams on the Artillery Ground. Faulkner's team won. This match may have been a decider; in which case Dingate's team must have won the second match on Friday, 15 July. The teams were not the same as before: Dingate, Richard Newland, Joseph Rudd, Maynard (of Surrey), and Little Bennett played against Faulkner, Joe Harris, William Durling (of Addington), James and John Bryant.

=== August ===
The Artillery Ground staged two matches on Monday, 8 August. First, Tom Faulkner and Joe Harris played Robert Colchin and Val Romney at "twos" for twenty guineas a side. Immediately afterwards, there was the return of the Waymark/Darville versus Bennett/Smith game, with Smith again allowed a substitute fielder. Neither result is known.

A "fives" game was played Saturday, 20 August on the Artillery Ground. The teams were: Robert Colchin, John Colchin, James Bryant, John Bryant, and Robert Lascoe against Joe Harris, Maynard, John Capon, William Anderson, and Walker. This is the only known mention of the player called Walker.

On Monday, 22 August, a "fives" game was played on the Artillery Ground for 20 guineas a side between Five of Berkshire and Five of London. Berkshire's team was Thomas Waymark, Darville, and three others. The London players were William Anderson, Little and Tall Bennett, John Capon, and George Carter. London won by an unknown margin.

Tom Faulkner's Five defeated Long Robin's Five on Monday, 29 August, by four runs. The match was played at the Artillery Ground for a prize of £200. Val Romney was badly injured and could not run but, the rules being play or pay, he was obliged to play as well as he could. The teams were Faulkner, Joe Harris, James Bryant, John Bryant, and William Durling against Colchin, Romney, Maynard, John Larkin, and Jones.

=== September ===
There were four known matches this month, all of them played on the Artillery Ground.

On Monday, 5 September, there was an odds match between Three of England and Five of Berkshire for 20 guineas. The teams were Robert Colchin, Tom Faulkner, and George Smith against Thomas Waymark and four others of Berkshire. George Smith was not allowed a substitute (termed a "Seeker-out" in the primary source) as in previous games, and had to do his share of the fielding. The result is unknown.

On Friday, 16 September, Colchin and Waymark teamed up to defeat Faulkner and Joe Harris. It was announced beforehand that "in case of rain, there is good shelter for the spectators". Apparently, the match gave such great satisfaction that an immediate return was arranged. Colchin & Waymark scored 10 and 17, against 0 and 15. In their first innings, Faulkner and Harris were both bowled second ball. Details were reported in the London Evening Post on Saturday, 17 September. The return was played next day for fifty guineas. Colchin and Waymark again defeated Faulkner and Joe Harris.

Finally, a "threes" game was played Friday, 23 September "for a considerable sum". Colchin, Waymark, and Maynard met Faulkner, Joe Harris, and John Bryant. The result is unknown.

== Eleven-a-side matches ==
Two Kent v England matches were played 10 and 13 June on Dartford Brent and the Artillery Ground respectively. Kent won the first by 11 runs, and the second by an unknown margin.

London defeated Lambeth 14 June on Peckham Rye Common, as reported by the Whitehall Evening Post on Thursday, 16 June. London also played against Croydon on 18 July, and Deptford & Greenwich on 15 August. Both matches were on the Artillery Ground, but the results are unknown.

On 23 August, Deptford & Greenwich hosted London on "Mr Siddle's new cricket-ground at Deptford". Again, the result is unknown.

== Other events ==
George Smith, keeper of the Artillery Ground, and landlord of the adjoining Pyed Horse in Chiswell Street, declared bankruptcy. Evidently his pricing problems of recent years did have some basis in needing to balance the books after all. A number of notices appeared in the press during the first six months of 1748, but Smith eventually resolved his problems, perhaps through the sale of other property, and was able to retain control of the Artillery Ground until 1752.

There was a game played 4 August on Coxheath Common between teams representing "the Hill" and "the Valley". This sounds like a similar idea to the early match at Chevening in the year 1610; and may have been commemorative.

In 1748, a legal action of Jeffreys v Parsons was heard before the King's Bench. The case concerned wagers that were almost certainly made on the above two Kent v England games, with Jeffreys claiming 25 guineas won from Parsons on each game. The parties came to an out of court agreement after the case was held over.

== First mentions ==
=== Clubs and teams ===
- The Rest; earliest known use of this name by a team.

=== Players ===
- John Capon (London and Surrey)
- George Carter (London)
- John Colchin (Bromley)
- William Durling (Addington and Surrey)
- Walker (probably London)

=== Venues ===
- Peckham Rye Common
- Mr Siddle's Ground, Deptford

== Bibliography ==
- ACS (1981). A Guide to Important Cricket Matches Played in the British Isles 1709–1863. Nottingham: ACS. OCLC 85045528.
- Buckley, G. B. (1935). Fresh Light on 18th Century Cricket. Birmingham: Cotterell & Co. OCLC 23450280.
- McCann, Tim (2004). Sussex Cricket in the Eighteenth Century (PDF). Vol. 88. Lewes: West Sussex Record Office. ISBN 978-08-54450-55-8.
- Waghorn, H. T. (2005) [1906]. The Dawn of Cricket. London: J. W. McKenzie. ISBN 978-09-47821-17-3.
