= William Bartholomew (cricketer) =

English cricketer

Personal information
- Full name: William Bartholomew

William Bartholomew, was an English cricketer.

The son of the Reverend Charles Bartholomew, a prominent Chertsey Cricket Club member, Bartholomew made his debut in important matches for Surrey against Kent at Bishopsbourne in 1773. He made a further appearance for Surrey in 1773 against Hampshire at Hambledon. His next appearance in an important game was five years later in 1778, when he played for Chertsey against England at Laleham Burway. Over a decade later, in 1789, he appeared in a fourth match for the Gentlemen of England against Middlesex at Marylebone. He scored 59 runs in his four matches, with a highest score of 30.
