= William Barton (English cricketer) =

English cricketer (1777–1825)

Personal information
- Born: 19 August 1793; Finsbury, Middlesex
- Died: 7 January 1825 (aged 47); Westminster, London
- Relatives: Robert Barton (nephew)

Domestic team information
- Years: Team
- 1795–1816: Middlesex
- 1798–1805: England
- FC debut: 25 May 1795 Middlesex v Marylebone Cricket Club (MCC)
- Last FC: 13 August 1817 William Ward's XI v EH Budd's XI
- Source: CricInfo, 20 June 2022

William Barton (16 January 1777 – 7 January 1825) was an English cricketer who played for several teams during the period between 1795 and 1817.

Barton was born at Finsbury in Middlesex in 1777. He is first known to have played for Middlesex in 1793 before making his important debut in 1795, playing for Middlesex against Marylebone Cricket Club (MCC) at Lord's Old Ground. Besides Middlesex, Barton played for England (i.e., the "rest" of England), Surrey, Kent, and Hampshire. Primarily a batter, his highest known score is 69.

Barton died at Westminster in London in 1825. His nephew Robert Barton played a single important match for Middlesex in 1850.

== Bibliography ==
- Birley, Derek (1999). A Social History of English Cricket. London: Aurum Press. ISBN 978-18-54107-10-7 – via Internet Archive.
- Carlaw, Derek (2020). Kent County Cricketers, A to Z: Part One (1806–1914) (PDF). Cardiff: ACS.
- Lewis, Paul (2014). For Kent and Country. Eastbourne: Reveille Press. ISBN 978-19-08336-63-7.
