= William Bartholomew =

William Bartholomew may refer to:

- William Bartholomew (British Army officer) (1877–1962), British general
- William Bartholomew (cricketer) (fl. 1773–89), English cricketer
- William Bartholomew (writer) (1793–1867), English librettist, composer, and writer
- William Hamond Bartholomew (1831–1919), English engineer
