= Berkshire county cricket team (18th century) =

Historical English cricket team

Berkshire
Team information
- Established: c. 1740
- Last match: 1795

History
- Notable players: George Boult Sr; Gilbert East; Edward Winter

The Berkshire county cricket team played several historically important matches between 1769 and 1795. (Note: Any match listed in the ACS' Important Match Guide (1981) is historically important, and therefore of the highest standard, whether or not a scorecard might exist. The same applies to numerous matches discovered by researchers since 1981. For further information, see First-class cricket.)

== Early history ==
Cricket was definitely being played in Surrey around 1550, and it is assumed that it must have arrived in neighbouring Berkshire soon afterwards. Even so, it was not until 1740 that the first matches involving the county were recorded, when a combined Berkshire, Buckinghamshire & Hertfordshire team played two matches against London. There had been earlier references to cricket in Eton College records, though Eton was then part of Buckinghamshire, albeit on the county boundary.

== Maidenhead and Berkshire to 1791 ==
Berkshire was first recorded as a county team in its own right when it played Surrey in June 1769. Some of the county's matches were ostensibly played by Maidenhead Cricket Club (sometimes rendered as "Oldfield"). The Maidenhead club was founded in the second half of the 18th century, and was based at the Old Field ground, in Bray, which is in the east of the county. The Berkshire and Maidenhead/Oldfield teams, which never played each other, were to all intents and purposes the same. The secondary sources differ on the subject of Maidenhead/Oldfield. 18th century nomenclature was always variable, and both have been used for the club's team name. Even so, the club presented itself as representative of Berkshire in the same way as Hornchurch did of Essex, and Brighton of Sussex, so its team may be styled Berkshire.

=== 1769–1775 ===
Berkshire played their first eleven-a-side match as an individual county team on 8 June 1769, when they hosted Surrey on Datchet Common. The match was reported by the St James Chronicle on Tuesday, 13 June. Surrey won by 6 runs. The next report concerns a match played Monday, 29 May 1775, on the Old Field in Bray between the Maidenhead and Risborough clubs with Lumpy Stevens assisting the former, while a player called Briggs was a given man for Risborough. This is the first reference found that is specific to the Maidenhead (aka Oldfield) Club at Old Field. This club shortly became synonymous with Berkshire as a county team.

=== 1779 ===
Signs of Berkshire's emergence were becoming apparent in 1779, beginning with a match in Maidenhead on 12 July. A team called the Berkshire Club (probably Maidenhead) played against a combined Hampshire & Berkshire team. It was announced a week earlier in the Reading Mercury, but the result is unknown. Next, on an unknown date in August, Berkshire travelled to Odiham Down for a match against Alresford. Again, the result is unknown. The Reading Mercury announced on the 9th that the match would be "some time in August". It said Alresford would combine with "some of the Hambledon Club against "the County of Berkshire with the Maidenhead Club". Much later in the season, there was a match at Henley between Berkshire and "the County of Oxford" for £25 a side. This is one of the earliest references to cricket in Oxfordshire, outside of the University of Oxford.

=== 1780–1783 ===
A single innings match took place 8 August 1780 between Maidenhead and Chertsey. The venue was Priestwood Common. Maidenhead won by 5 runs.

In 1781, there were four matches involving teams from Berkshire. Maidenhead played Odiham twice in July, and both were won by Odiham. Maidenhead played against Buckinghamshire in August, and won by 124 runs. In September, there was an inter-county match between Oxfordshire and Berkshire, but the result is unknown.

Maidenhead defeated Chertsey by 6 wickets in September 1782. In October, Odiham defeated "the Berkshire Club" (presumably Maidenhead) on Odiham Down in October. Odiham and Maidenhead played each other twice more in 1783, Odiham winning both games.

In September 1783, Chertsey played Berkshire on Laleham Burway. Tom Taylor was a given man for Berkshire, and scored 93 out of 179. Of the 22 players involved, only seven are known to have had significant careers. Berkshire won by 10 wickets.

=== 1784–1786 ===
Berkshire played Buckinghamshire twice in 1784, winning the first match by an innings and 21 runs. The result of the second is not on record. In June 1785, Berkshire played Essex on Datchet Common, and Berkshire won by 148 runs. Later that season, Berkshire defeated Buckinghamshire by 215 runs.

In September 1786, Berkshire played a combined Buckinghamshire & Middlesex XI at Warfield. Several noted players were involved, including William Bedster, William Fennex, and George Boult Sr. The result is unknown. H. T. Waghorn's Dawn of Cricket in 1786 has games involving the Warfield club. It is known that teams of this type were often augmented by given men like Lumpy Stevens and David Harris, but it has to be assumed that they played parish matches only, the same applying to the Farnham, Guildford, and Godalming teams which are also mentioned in Waghorn's book. While some brief details of the matches are known, the results are usually not. An exception to that is when Farnham and Warfield played each other on Holt Pound in June 1786, as Farnham won by 7 wickets.

== Important matches, 1792–1795 ==
From 1792 to 1795, eleven of Berkshire's matches are recognised as historically important. In their known important matches, Berkshire played against Marylebone Cricket Club (MCC) eight times. They also played one match each against Kent, Middlesex, and a combined MCC/Middlesex XI.

There were two matches between MCC and Berkshire in 1793. The first, at Lord's Old Ground (Lord's), ended in a win for Berkshire by 119 runs. To further the confusion, Haygarth called it MCC v The Oldfield Club. The ACS Guide says the game should be called MCC v Maidenhead, yet in several other fixtures they use Oldfield too. Berkshire's team by this time had a high standard. The second match was on the Old Field ground, and Berkshire won by 85 runs.

Berkshire lost twice to MCC in July 1794. They recovered to win a third match by 7 runs, and then a fourth by 6 wickets. At the end of August, Berkshire defeated Kent by 49 runs.

Berkshire had two matches at Lord's in 1795. They lost to Middlesex by 233 runs in July, and to MCC by 2 wickets in August. These were Berkshire's last important matches, as the team abruptly ceased to appear in the records after 1795.

== Players ==
Among those who played for Berkshire were George Boult Sr, Gilbert East, William Fennex, J. Finch, S. Gill, N. Graham, James Harding, David Harris, Thomas Ingram, Richard Lawrence, Monk, Edward Morant, Robert Quarme, Thomas Ray, Joey Ring, Thomas Shackle, Tom Taylor, Thompson, Timber, Edward Winter, and William Yalden. (Note: Several of these players, including Fennex, Harding, Ray, Ring, Shackle, Yalden, and Hambledon's Harris and Taylor, appeared for Berkshire as given men.)

== Aftermath ==
Eventually, by 1841, a loose association of Berkshire clubs had been formed, and the present Berkshire County Cricket Club was established in 1895. The club joined the Minor Counties Championship in 1896.

== Bibliography ==
- ACS (1981). A Guide to Important Cricket Matches Played in the British Isles 1709–1863. Nottingham: ACS. OCLC 85045528.
- Bowen, Rowland (1970). Cricket: A History of its Growth and Development. London: Eyre & Spottiswoode. ISBN 978-04-13278-60-9.
- Buckley, G. B. (1935). Fresh Light on 18th Century Cricket. Birmingham: Cotterell & Co. OCLC 23450280.
- Haygarth, Arthur (1997) [1862]. Scores & Biographies, Volume 2 (1827–1840). Kennington: Frederick Lillywhite. ISBN 978-19-00592-23-9.
- Major, John (2007). More Than A Game. London: HarperCollins. ISBN 978-00-07183-64-7 – via Internet Archive.
- Underdown, David (2000). Start of Play. Westminster: Allen Lane. ISBN 978-07-13993-30-1 – via Internet Archive.
- Waghorn, H. T. (1899). Cricket Scores, Notes, &c. From 1730–1773. Edinburgh: Blackwood. OCLC 1086375331.
- Waghorn, H. T. (2005) [1906]. The Dawn of Cricket. London: J. W. McKenzie. ISBN 978-09-47821-17-3.
