= John Walker (cricketer, born 1768) =

English cricketer

John Walker (1768 – 3 September 1835) was a noted professional cricketer in the late 18th century. His career spanned the 1789 to 1806 seasons and he played mainly for Surrey and various representative teams, including Marylebone Cricket Club (MCC).

He was born in Churt, near Frensham, Surrey, and belonged to a cricketing family, his brothers being the more famous Tom and Harry Walker.

John Walker was a useful batsman who made either 50 or 51 known appearances. He has been credited with 682 runs in 98 innings with a highest score of 35. He has also been credited with 23 catches and 1 (bowled) wicket. His fielding statistics are made uncertain by scorecards stating "c Walker" when he was playing alongside one or both of his brothers. His appearances total depends on whether it was he or James Wells who played for England against Hampshire in 1794: S&B records Wells but adds that Walker is included in another account. It is possible that Walker was selected and Wells stood in for him.

Walker continued to play in local cricket until his death which was caused by an accident on the field. He had tripped over a tuft of grass and ruptured himself. He died from complications nine days later, in Thursley, Surrey.

In Scores & Biographies, Arthur Haygarth states that Walker lived in Thursley for 41 years and was a grocer because he had confused him with the John Walker that created the Johnnie Walker whisky brand.
