= George Boult Sr =

English cricketer (late 18th century)

George T. Boult was an English cricketer of the late 18th century. He was an amateur player who was involved in organising matches as well as being a noted batsman. He is primarily associated with Berkshire via the influential Maidenhead and Bray Cricket Club.

== Career ==
Boult was probably Berkshire's best regular player during the short period that it enjoyed important match status, (Note: Any match listed in the ACS' Important Match Guide (1981) is historically important, and therefore of the highest standard, whether or not a scorecard might exist. The same applies to numerous matches discovered by researchers since 1981. For further information, see First-class cricket.) although the team did benefit from given man appearances by such as Tom Taylor, William Fennex, Billy Beldham, David Harris, and other good players of the time. Boult subsequently played for Middlesex.

Boult was elected to membership of the Hambledon Club in 1786, when it was already past its heyday. He resigned in 1791, but he did play a few games for Hampshire.

Boult made 23 known appearances in important matches from 1785 to 1797. He had several good scores including two fifties (53 & 55) in one match for Berkshire v Essex in 1785. Later, when playing for Middlesex, he made two good scores against MCC: 89 in 1791 and 76 in 1795. He made a century (108) in a minor match for Windsor Forest versus a Surrey XI in 1788. Prevailing conditions were heavily in favour of the bowlers, and a century was a notable achievement.

There were several cricketing Boults, including his own son George Boult Jr. Members of the Boult family were playing club cricket in Maidenhead as late as 1836.

== Bibliography ==
- ACS (1981). A Guide to Important Cricket Matches Played in the British Isles 1709–1863. Nottingham: ACS. OCLC 85045528.
- Ashley-Cooper, F. S. (1924). Hambledon Cricket Chronicle: 1772–1796. London: Jenkins. OCLC 38498574.
