= Thomas Ray (cricketer) =

English cricketer

Thomas Ray (dates unknown) was an English cricketer who played mainly for Berkshire and Middlesex. He was for many years employed by Marylebone Cricket Club (MCC) as a professional who probably coached the members.

Ray was a good batsman but principally noted for his fielding, which was outstanding. Ray's known career of 72 cricket matches was from 1792 to 1811.
