= Arthur Ingram Aston =

English diplomat

Sir Arthur Ingram Aston GCB (23 December 1798 – 5 May 1859) was an English diplomat.

== Biography ==
Aston was born in London into a prominent landed family, the Astons of Aston Hall, Aston-by-Sutton, Cheshire. The family landholdings included Aston and Dutton.

He was the second son of Capt. Henry Charles Hervey-Aston and Hon. Harriet Ingram-Shepherd, fourth daughter of Charles Ingram, 9th Viscount of Irvine. He was a great grandson of Hon. Rev. Dr. Henry Hervey, fifth son of John Hervey, 1st Earl of Bristol, who assumed the Aston surname.

He was educated at Brasenose College, Oxford.

Aston served at the British embassies in Vienna in 1819 and in Rio de Janeiro in 1826. He was appointed secretary of the British embassy in Paris in 1833 and became envoy-extraordinary and plenipotentiary at Madrid from 1839 to 1843. He was created a Knight Grand Cross of the Order of the Bath (GCB) upon returning to England in 1843.

He was High Sheriff of Cheshire in 1850–51.

He died unmarried, at which point Aston Hall passed to a nephew.

Diplomatic posts
Preceded by George Jerningham	British Ambassador to Spain; 1840 – 1843	Succeeded by George Jerningham
