= Henry Crosoer =

English cricketer (1765–unknown)

Henry Crosoer (1765 at Bridge, Kent – ?) was an English cricketer of the late 18th century who played for Kent. His name was sometimes given as Crozoer. Crosoer seems to have been a wicketkeeper-batsman, and he made eight known historically important match appearances for Kent between the 1786 and 1790 seasons.

== Career ==
Crosoer's first known appearance in an important match was for Kent against Hampshire on Windmill Down in July 1786. He played instead of Stephen Amherst, presumably as a late replacement. According to the printed match scorecard, he opened the innings with William Bullen, and made scores of 7 and 9. In both innings, he was bowled by Richard Purchase. Hampshire won the match by 1 wicket.

In August of the same year, Crosoer played for Kent against Hampshire on Moulsey Hurst, a neutral venue. He scored 0 and 3, having been caught by Tom Taylor in the first innings, and then bowled by Lumpy Stevens in the second. Hampshire won this game by 35 runs.

== Bibliography ==
- Ashley-Cooper, F. S. (1929). Kent Cricket Matches, 1719–1880. Canterbury: Gibbs & Sons. OCLC 220674085.
- Buckley, G. B. (1935). Fresh Light on 18th Century Cricket. Birmingham: Cotterell & Co. OCLC 23450280.
- Haygarth, Arthur (1996) [1862]. Scores & Biographies, Volume 1 (1744–1826). Kennington: Frederick Lillywhite. ISBN 978-19-00592-23-9.
