= David Harris (English cricketer) =

English cricketer

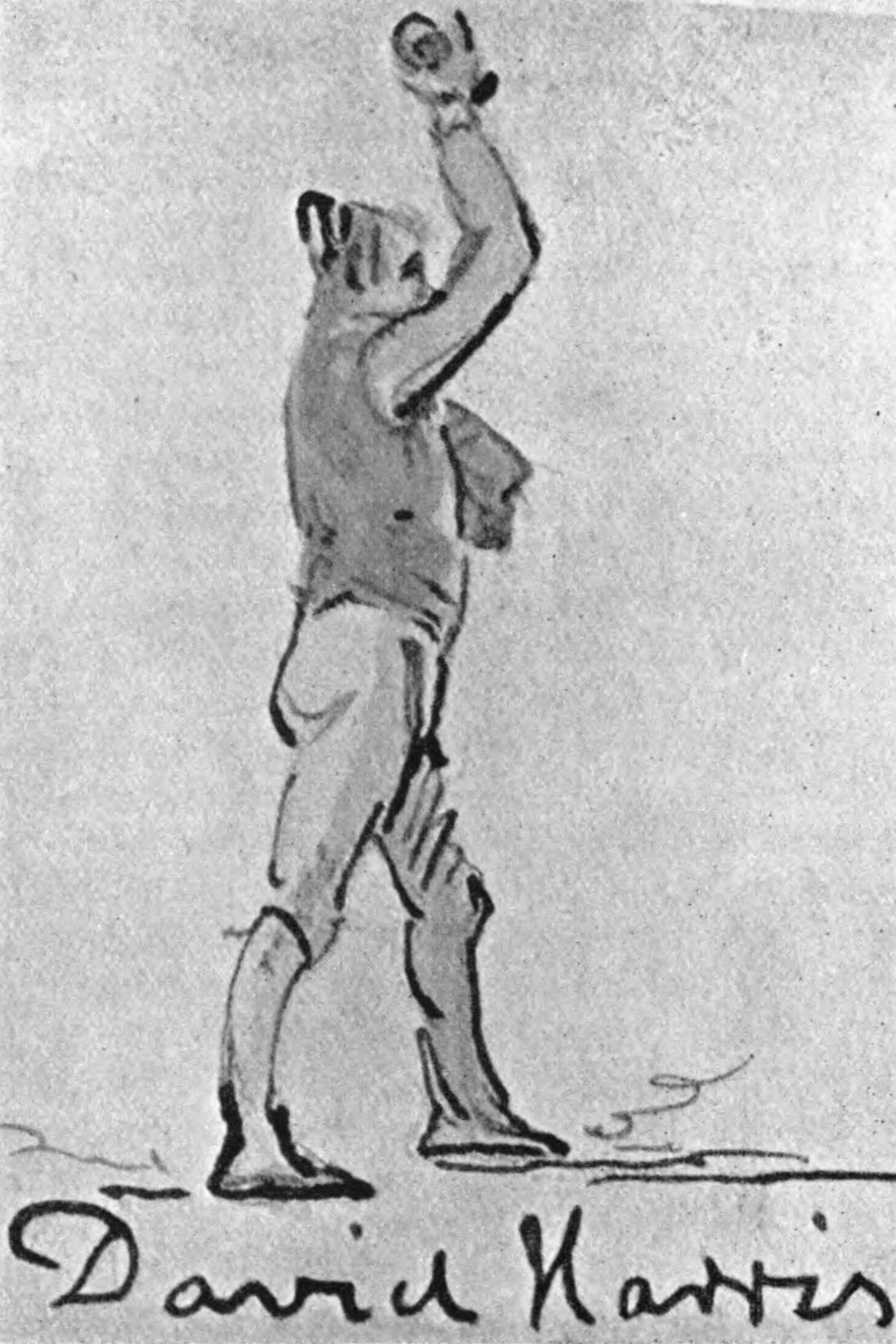

Personal information
- Full name: David Harris
- Born: 1755; Elvetham, Hampshire, England
- Died: 19 May 1803 (aged 47–48); Crookham Village, Hampshire, England
- Batting: Left-handed
- Bowling: Right-arm fast
- Role: Bowler

Domestic team information
- Years: Team
- 1782–1798: Hampshire

David Harris (1755 – 19 May 1803) was an English cricketer who played from 1782 to 1798.

He made 78 known appearances and was mainly associated with Hampshire when the Hambledon Club organised its teams. As well as playing for Hampshire, Harris appeared for a number of other teams including Berkshire, Kent, Surrey, Marylebone Cricket Club and several invitation XIs.

Noted for his fast and accurate bowling, Harris was a right arm fast underarm bowler and a left-handed batsman.

== Career ==
Born in 1755 at Elvetham, Hampshire, the earliest known mentions of Harris are playing for Odiham in 1782.

Harris' first recorded game for Hampshire was against Kent in July 1782. Although he was never noted as a batsman, Harris made the top score of 27 in Hampshire's first innings, in which they were dismissed for 87. Harris played three times for Hampshire in the 1783 season, twice against Kent and once against England. He took nine wickets in these matches.

Harris is only recorded once in 1784 when he again played for Odiham in a minor match. In 1785, when few important matches took place, Harris played for Berkshire against Essex.

On 13 July 1786, Harris had his best-known performance to date when he took four 1st innings wickets for Hampshire v. Kent at Windmill Down, Hampshire winning the game by 1 wicket. This was the match in which Tom Sueter was given out and hit the ball twice, the earliest recorded instance of this form of dismissal. On 8–12 August of the same year, Harris played for the White Conduit Club against Kent at Bishopsbourne Paddock and took six wickets in the match, three in each innings, to help White Conduit to a 164 run victory. White Conduit's big win was due to Tom Walker and Tom Taylor becoming the first players known to score a century in the same innings. Walker made 95* and 102, just missing the honour of becoming the first player to score two centuries in a match.

Playing for Sir Horatio Mann's XI against the Earl of Winchilsea's XI at the new Lord's Old Ground on 26–28 May 1788, Harris took 10 wickets in the match with 4 in the 1st innings and 6 in the 2nd. But it was to little avail as Winchilsea's XI won by 106 runs.

By now, Harris' reputation was well established and he played regularly in major matches into the 1790s. He was a frequent taker of wickets and again took ten in a match on 30–31 August 1790 when he guided Hampshire to a 10-wicket win against England at Lord's Old Ground. On 15–17 August 1792, Harris had the best known return of his career when he took 11 wickets in the match for Hampshire against Kent at Cobham Park, including eight in the first innings. Hampshire won by 8 wickets.

His later career was ruined by attacks of gout and Harris played his final match on 13–15 August 1798 for England v. Surrey at Lord's Old Ground. He took five wickets in the 1st innings and his last, subject to the batting order, was when he bowled W Wells for 5. He scored 0* in his final innings and his team won the match by an innings and 1 run. He died 19 May 1803, Crookham Village, Hampshire

== Style and technique ==
In taking my place at the wicket, I almost felt as if taking my ground in a duel... and my terrors were so much increased by the mock pity and sympathy of Hammond, Beldham, and others round the wicket, that when this mighty bowler, this Jupiter tonas, hurled his bolt at me, I shut my eyes in the intensity of my panic, and mechanically gave a random desperate blow, which, to my utter astonishment, was followed by a loud cry all over the ring of 'run, run'._{– Playwright Lord Frederick Reynolds on facing Harris.}

Harris was highly rated by his contemporaries, especially John Nyren, who called him "the very best bowler; a bowler who, between any one and himself, comparison must fail".

Nyren described Harris' style and technique in some detail. Harris began from an erect stance "like a soldier at drill" and raised the ball to his forehead before stepping forward. In his delivery stride, he brought the ball from under his arm "by a twist" and nearly as high as his armpit. With this action he would "push it, as it were, from him". Nyren says the speed of the delivery was "extraordinary" and that he could not understand how Harris managed to achieve such speed.

Some line drawings of Harris and other players of the 1790s have survived. Harris is shown in the characteristic pose described by Nyren as he began his action, standing erect with the ball raised over his head. The ball when delivered was pitched very fast and accurately. Harris seems to have got "pace off the pitch" and Nyren has recorded that numerous batsmen received nasty injuries to their unprotected hands from balls that trapped their (ungloved) fingers against the bat handle.

Like Thomas Boxall and the brothers Tom and Harry Walker, Harris used to practice his bowling in a barn during the winter.

Writing in 1900, F. S. Ashley-Cooper said in his introduction to At the Sign of the Wicket that the best 18th century players "possessed that amount of genius which would make them excellent players in any age". He named Harris, John Frame, Richard Newland, and John Small as examples.

== Personal life ==
Harris was born at Elvetham but moved when still a child to Crookham (now known as Crookham Village), where he lived for the rest of his life. He never married and was a potter by trade.

Nyren, who knew Harris personally, described him as "a muscular, bony man, standing about five feet 9½ inches". Nyren remarked on Harris' personality and looks by saying he had "a remarkably kind and gentle expression" and an "honest face". Harris, said Nyren, was "a man of so strict a principle" and "such high honour".

Harris suffered from gout in his later years and the sources have recorded how he would arrive at a game on crutches and then sit on a chair between deliveries. He was unable to play after 1798 and "latterly, in fact, was quite a cripple". He died in 1803 at Crookham and was buried at nearby Crondall, though no tombstone was erected.

== Bibliography ==
- Arthur Haygarth, Scores & Biographies, Volume 1 (1744–1826), Lillywhite, 1862
- Ashley Mote, The Glory Days of Cricket, Robson, 1997
- John Nyren, The Cricketers of my Time (ed. Ashley Mote), Robson, 1998
- James Pycroft, The Cricket Field, Longman, 1854
- H T Waghorn, The Dawn of Cricket, Electric Press, 1906
