= Thomas Shackle =

English cricketer

Thomas Shackle (dates unknown) was an English professional cricketer who made 29 known appearances in important matches from 1789 to 1809. He was mainly associated with Middlesex but he also played for Berkshire and was employed as a ground staff bowler by Marylebone Cricket Club (MCC).
