= Thomas Ingram (cricketer) =

English cricketer

Thomas Ingram (dates unknown) was an English cricketer of the late 18th century. He was a left-handed batsman and a wicket-keeper.

According to Scores and Biographies, Ingram was for a time a victualler at Cobham in Surrey. He made his debut in a 1787 match between a White Conduit Club & Moulsey Heath combine against Hornchurch, going on to play 21 matches in a career that lasted until 1797. He played for a variety of teams, appearing four times for Surrey and Hornchurch XIs and three times for Essex and England.

Ingram's best performance as a wicket-keeper was in an Essex match against Kent at Dartford Brent in August 1792 when he took five catches and made three stumpings.
