= Edward Hussey (cricketer) =

English cricketer (1749–1816)

Personal information
- Born: 3 November 1749; Burwash, Sussex
- Died: 4 July 1816 (aged 66); Scotney Castle, Lamberhurst, Kent

Domestic team information
- Years: Team
- 1773–1796: Kent
- 1790–1793: Marylebone Cricket Club (MCC)

Edward Hussey (3 November 1749 – 4 July 1816) was an English landowner and sportsman who played cricket towards the end of the 18th century. He owned Scotney Castle on the border between Kent and Sussex, served as a magistrate and was a member of the Society of Royal Kentish Bowmen. He committed suicide in 1816.

== Early life ==
Hussey was born at Burwash in Sussex in 1749, the oldest surviving son of Thomas Hussey and his wife Ann (née Berkley). The Hussey family were originally from Worcestershire and had become rich through the iron industry. In Sussex they worked with local iron makers on the Weald. They owned property at Burwash and at Ashford in Kent, and Hussey was referred to as "Hussey of Ashford town" in a poem of 1773. (Note: The poem, Surrey Triumphant by John Duncombe was written to celebrate a victory by Surrey over Kent in a cricket match as Bishopsbourne Paddock near Canterbury. Hussey played for Kent in the match. The poem was published in the Kentish Gazette in July 1773.) His mother was the daughter of Maurice Berkley a surgeon from Southwark and his first wife Anne Callow. Maurice moved to Nevis in the West Indies in 1731 and remarried. (Note: The Berkley family owned property on Nevis which was worked by slaves. Maurice Berkley died in 1735 or 1736. His son, Ann Berkley's step-brother, Henry owned slaves when he died in 1800.) Two of Edward Hussey's younger brothers were clergymen―John Hussey died in India and William was Rector of Sandhurst. He also had five sisters.

== Sporting life ==
Hussey was educated at Westminster School. writing in 1867, William Lucas Collins regarded that "none has a wider reputation" as a cricketer at Westminster than Hussey. After leaving school in December 1765, Hussey was admitted to the Inner Temple in February 1769. He is known to have played between 1773 and 1797 for a variety of teams, including Kent and ones organised by the Marylebone Cricket Club (MCC). He was a member of the White Conduit Club before it effectively became the MCC in 1787 and played in a total of 18 matches.

As well as cricket, Hussey was a "well known" rider and archer and a generally good sportsman. Writing in 1862 Arthur Haygarth described him as "a Kentish bowman, a bold and excellent rider, as well as a good cricketer", and he joined The Society of Royal Kentish Bowmen in August 1789. In 1794 he was awarded a silver horn, given to the Society by the then Prince of Wales.

== Personal life and Scotney ==
Hussey married Elizabeth Bridge of Bocking in Essex in June 1776. The couple had five children, all of whom had died by 1817; Elizabeth died in 1793. Hussey inherited property at Goudhurst in Kent and at Ticehurst in Sussex.

In 1778 Hussey purchased Scotney Castle, close to Lamberhurst on the border between Kent and Sussex and adjoining both of his other properties. The property, which dates from the 14th century, had been owned by the Darrell family until 1775 when it had been bought by John Richards, although parts of the estate had been sold off over the course of the 18th century. Hussey lived in the property until his death, re-establishing the parkland surrounding the castle by purchasing the land which had been previously sold as it became available. The property was extensively redeveloped by his grandson, Edward Hussey III, during the mid-19th century and a new house built on the estate. It remained in the hands of the family until 1970 when it was bequeathed to the National Trust and remains in their possession as a visitor attraction.

Hussey was a Justice of the Peace in both Kent and Sussex, the Scotney estate straddling the border at the time. He died at Scotney in July 1816, committing suicide by shooting himself with a blunderbuss. A coroner's inquest concluded that he was suffering from "lunacy". He was aged 66.

== Bibliography ==
- Carlaw, Derek (2020). Kent County Cricketers, A to Z: Part One (1806–1914) (PDF). Cardiff: ACS.
- Lewis, Paul (2014). For Kent and Country. Eastbourne: Reveille Press. ISBN 978-19-08336-63-7.
