= James Harding (cricketer) =

English cricketer

James Thomas Harding (dates unknown) was an English professional cricketer who made 36 known appearances in important matches between 1792 and 1810. He was mainly associated with Surrey.
