= William Epps =

English cricketer (died 1833)

William Epps (died 1833) was an English cricket writer and historian who was active in the late 18th century. He is noted for compiling Grand Matches of Cricket 1771 to 1791, published by Rochester Publishing Co. in 1799. His work is a recognised source and was used by Arthur Haygarth for his Scores & Biographies series.

In 2023, Grand Matches of Cricket 1771 to 1791 was offered by Peter Harrington Rare Books for £225,000. The copy belonged to iconic cricket commentator and book collector John Arlott. An anonymous cricket enthusiast contributed funds to enable it to be acquired by the British Library. It is now part of the Printed Heritage Collections at the British Library.
