= Henry Hervey Aston =

English cricketer and soldier

Harvey Aston
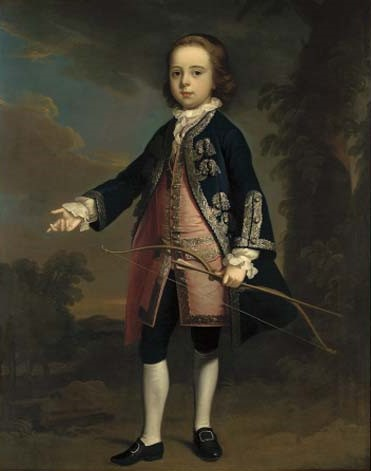

Personal information
- Full name: Henry Hervey Aston
- Born: 1759; Aston-by-Sutton, Cheshire, England
- Died: 23 December 1798 (aged 38/39); Madras, Madras Presidency, British India

Domestic team information
- Years: Team
- 1791–1792: Middlesex
- 1792–1793: Marylebone Cricket Club (MCC)
- 1792: Hampshire

Colonel Henry Hervey Aston (1759 – 23 December 1798) was an English cricketer who played for the Hambledon Club. He was at different times a member of both the Hambledon Club and Marylebone Cricket Club (MCC). A useful batsman, Aston made 13 known important match appearances from 1786 to 1793 when his military duties took precedence.

In December 1793, Aston obtained a Lieutenant-colonelcy in the 12th Foot. Afterward, he went to Madras, where, in 1798, he fought a duel with Major Picton. Both fired into the air. The next day, in another duel, he was wounded by a new adversary, Major Allen. After languishing for about a week, Aston died on 23 December 1798.

== Family ==
Aston married Hon. Harriet Ingram-Shepherd, fourth daughter of Charles Ingram, 9th Viscount of Irvine and his wife Frances Shepherd, of Temple Newsam near Leeds, on 16 September 1789. They had two sons, Henry Charles Hervey-Aston and Sir Arthur Ingram Aston, and a daughter, Harriet, who married Lieut.-Col. Edmund Henry Bridgeman.
