= Thomas Swayne =

English cricketer

Thomas Swayne (dates of birth and death unknown) was a noted professional cricketer who played for Surrey in the 1770s.

Depending on his age, it is assumed that most of his career took place before cricket's statistical record began with regular scorecards in 1772. He made 3 known appearances in important matches between 1775 and 1778, but it is believed he was playing much earlier as he had become the landlord of the White Hart at Chertsey by 1773. The vocation of pub landlord was a common career option for players at the end of their playing days.

According to the Public Advertiser on Friday 10 September 1773, at the following week's Surrey v Hampshire match, "a stand will be built on the ground (i.e., Laleham Burway), and the best accommodation provided there and at the White Hart at Chertsey by Thomas Swayne".

== External sources ==
- CricketArchive record of Thomas Swayne
