= Old Field, Bray =

Cricket ground in Berkshire

Coordinates: 51.518°N 0.710°W

Old Field cricket ground
- Interactive map of Old Field cricket ground
- Location: Bray, Berkshire
- Home club: Maidenhead Cricket Club
- County club: Berkshire
- Establishment: by 1775
- Last used: 1794

Old Field at Bray, Berkshire was a noted cricket ground in the late 18th century. It was used as the venue for four historically important matches between 1792 and 1794, in addition to numerous others. Bray is near Maidenhead, and the ground was the home venue of Maidenhead Cricket Club when it was founded in the second half of the 18th century. It was used by the Berkshire county team which was strong at that time.

== Location and history ==
=== Name ===
The name of the venue is correctly rendered "Old Field, Bray" but the designation "Oldfield Bray" is given by Scores and Biographies (S&B) which also calls the Berkshire team "Oldfield" in one match. CricketArchive explains that S&B, and some other sources, use "Oldfield Bray" as if "Bray" were part of the name of the ground. It has been established that the ground was called Old Field, and it was located in the parish of Bray, which in the 18th century included the southern half of what became Maidenhead, itself created as a separate parish in 1894.

=== Matches ===
On Monday, 29 May 1775, there was a game on the Old Field between the Maidenhead and Risborough clubs with Lumpy Stevens assisting the former, while a player called Briggs was a given man for Risborough. Maidenhead won by 151 runs. This is the first reference found that is specific to the Maidenhead club at Old Field. It shortly became synonymous with Berkshire as a county team.

The next reference is in 1782. Berkshire hosted Odiham at Old Field on 3 October, but the result is unknown. Four days later, Odiham defeated "the Berkshire Club" (which may have meant Maidenhead) on Odiham Down. Maidenhead played Odiham twice more in 1783, but lost both times. Having met at Odiham Down on 20–21 May, they played a return match at Old Field on 17 July, which Odiham won by 9 wickets.

On 15 October 1784, Old Field staged a two-a-side single wicket match between Two of Berkshire and Two of Kent. Playing for Berkshire were William Bedster and Richard Lawrence. Their opponents were William Brazier and William Bullen. The result of this match is unknown, but it was the return to one at Blackheath on 5 October, which Brazier and Bullen won by two wickets.

Eight years passed before Old Field again staged an important match. On 2–4 August 1792, Berkshire defeated Marylebone Cricket Club (MCC) by 10 runs. Thomas Lord played for MCC, and was involved in at least nine Berkshire dismissals. By 1793, the Berkshire county team were setting a high standard. They played MCC again, on 25–26 July, and won by 85 runs.

The last two important matches on the ground were in 1794. On 18–20 June, R. Leigh's XI defeated E. G. Morant's XI by 89 runs. MCC returned on 7–8 July for another match with Berkshire, and this time MCC won by 3 wickets.

=== Site ===
The ground was located on the Bray side of Chauntry Road but no longer exists, the site now being occupied by the Fisheries.

== Bibliography ==
- Buckley, G. B. (1935). Fresh Light on 18th Century Cricket. Birmingham: Cotterell & Co. OCLC 23450280.
- Haygarth, Arthur (1996) [1862]. Scores & Biographies, Volume 1 (1744–1826). Kennington: Frederick Lillywhite. ISBN 978-19-00592-23-9.
- Waghorn, H. T. (2005) [1906]. The Dawn of Cricket. London: J. W. McKenzie. ISBN 978-09-47821-17-3.
