= Gilbert East =

English cricketer

Gilbert East (1763–1865) was an English cricketer of the late 18th century who played mainly for Berkshire, Oldfield, and the White Conduit Club. He played in 12 matches between 1786 and 1794.

East succeeded to the East Baronetcy of Hall Place, Maidenhead in 1819 on the death of his father, Sir William East. He is buried at Hurley, Berkshire with a monument by James Sherwood Westmacott.
