= Sir George Talbot, 3rd Baronet =

English cricketer and baronet

George Talbot (1761 – 1850) was an English cricketer and baronet.

Talbot was an early Marylebone Cricket Club (MCC) member who had previously been elected a Hambledon Club member in 1788. He played in 23 recorded matches from 1785 to 1791 as a batsman.

In Hambledon Cricket Chronicle, he is mentioned in connection with "some quaint wagers" in the betting book at White's Club. A member of the military, in 1812 he succeeded to his family title as 3rd Baronet.

== Sources ==
- Fresh Light on 18th Century Cricket by G B Buckley
- Hambledon Cricket Chronicle by F S Ashley-Cooper
- Scores & Biographies, Volume 1 by Arthur Haygarth
- The Dawn of Cricket by H T Waghorn
