= Thomas Scott (cricketer) =

English cricketer

Thomas Scott (1766 – 5 November 1799) was an English cricketer who played for Hampshire at the time of the Hambledon Club. He was a specialist batsman.

Born 1766 at Alton, Hampshire, the earliest known mention of Scott was when he played for Odiham and Alton against Farnham at the Holt Pound ground in Farnham in 1784. In John Nyren's The Cricketers of my Time, Scott is listed among the author's "most eminent players in the Hambledon Club when it was in its glory", although he does not otherwise mention him. The earliest biographical information about Scott is provided by Arthur Haygarth, who describes Scott as a "very successful batsman indeed for the Hambledon Club, for several seasons". Haygarth believed that Scott was by trade a glover in Alton, his home village.

Scott played in 29 matches, most frequently for Hampshire, although he appeared as a given man for a number of other teams. and played six times for England.

Scott died in 1799 at Alton. His tombstone was still standing in Alton churchyard in 1857. It confirms his date of death, that he died at the age of 33 years old and that his parents were called Thomas and Sarah. The cause of death is unknown.
