= John Dampier =

English cricketer (1750–1826)

John Dampier (1750 – 18 August 1826) was an English amateur cricketer in the late 18th century. His place of birth is unknown but he was educated at Eton College. He died in Ely, Cambridgeshire when he was either 75 or 76 years old.

Dampier made five known appearances in historically important matches (Note: Any match listed in the ACS' Important Match Guide (1981) is historically important, and therefore of the highest standard, whether or not a scorecard might exist. The same applies to numerous matches discovered by researchers since 1981. For further information, see First-class cricket.) for the White Conduit Club, based at White Conduit Fields in Islington, between 1785 and 1787. He was an early member of Marylebone Cricket Club (MCC), which was founded in 1787, but he is not known to have played for MCC.

Dampier played twice in 1785 for WCC against Gents of Kent, one in Sevenoaks on 20 June, and the other in Islington on 30 June. He played for WCC v Kent in June 1786, and again in August. Dampier's last known match was WCC v England at Lord's in June 1787.

== Bibliography ==
- ACS (1981). A Guide to Important Cricket Matches Played in the British Isles 1709–1863. Nottingham: ACS. OCLC 85045528.
- Haygarth, Arthur (1996) [1862]. Scores & Biographies, Volume 1 (1744–1826). Kennington: Frederick Lillywhite. ISBN 978-19-00592-23-9.
- Waghorn, H. T. (2005) [1906]. The Dawn of Cricket. London: J. W. McKenzie. ISBN 978-09-47821-17-3.
