= Maidenhead and Bray Cricket Club =

English cricket club established in 1798

Maidenhead & Bray Cricket Club
- League: Thames Valley Cricket League

Personnel
- Coach: Nicholas Denning
- Chairman: Tim Child

Team information
- Founded: 1798; 228 years ago
- Home ground: High Street, Bray
- Official website: mandbcc.co.uk

Maidenhead & Bray Cricket Club is a cricket club based in Bray, Berkshire, England. Founded in 1798, it is one of the oldest cricket clubs in Berkshire. The club plays in the Thames Valley Cricket League and is based at its ground on the High Street in Bray, overlooked by the Church of St Michael and within walking distance of the River Thames. The ground and clubhouse are shared with Maidenhead Hockey Club.

== History ==
=== Early history ===
The first recorded cricketer from Bray was selected in 1744 to play at the Artillery Ground in London. In 1746, four "millers of Bray hill" played a team of four from Addington in Surrey at the Artillery Ground. The club was variously known as Maidenhead CC, Bray CC, the Old Field Club and even Berkshire, with the same players representing all these nominally different teams. The ground at Old Field was probably established around 1777, and from 1774 records of cricket matches at Bray become frequent. It hosted four first-class matches between 1792 and 1794, used by the Berkshire county team which was strong during this period.

In 1781, Maidenhead played Odiham twice in July, and both were won by Odiham. Maidenhead played against Buckinghamshire in August and won by 124 runs. In 1782, Maidenhead defeated Chertsey by 6 wickets in September. Odiham defeated "the Berkshire Club" (presumably Maidenhead) on Odiham Down in October. Odiham and Maidenhead played each other twice more in 1783, Odiham winning both games.

During the later decades of the 18th century, the club typically played eight matches a year, including regular fixtures against the MCC for substantial wagers of up to 1,000 guineas. On at least one occasion, the MCC failed to appear and forfeited their wager.

The formal foundation date of the club is taken as 1798.

=== 19th century matches ===
In 1853, the club played against an England side in a two-innings match over two days and won, albeit with the assistance of seven additional players. The England side included the notable cricketers John Lillywhite and John Wisden.

As late as 1858, the Bray cricketers took on "the World" on their Old Field ground.

=== Merger and modern era ===
For several years between the World Wars, Maidenhead CC and Bray CC operated as separate clubs, each with their own ground. The two clubs joined forces in 1946, and from that time the ground and clubhouse have been shared with Maidenhead Hockey Club.

The club has twice been overall winners of the Thames Valley League, in 1976 and 1986, and has also won the Jubilee Cup. The club celebrated its bicentenary in 1998. It was the first club in Berkshire to be awarded the ECB Clubmark by the England and Wales Cricket Board.

The club currently runs six teams on Saturdays in the Thames Valley Cricket League, with a friendly side on Sundays. It has a thriving colts section with multiple boys' teams competing in the Berkshire Youth Cricket League, and in 2016 it established a ladies section, making it one of the few clubs in Berkshire with both women's and girls' cricket.

== Sir Michael Parkinson ==
The television presenter Sir Michael Parkinson became president of the club in 1987 and held the role until his death in August 2023. Parkinson was instrumental in keeping the club financially afloat during difficult periods through a series of annual celebrity cricket days, known as "Parkie Day", which became a highlight of the local sporting and social calendar.

The celebrity matches attracted major names from both the sporting and entertainment worlds, including Imran Khan, David Gower, Dennis Lillee, Mike Atherton, David Bairstow, Allan Lamb, John Emburey, Geoff Marsh, Kevin Pietersen, as well as Billy Connolly, Chris Tarrant, Gary Lineker, George Best, Jimmy Tarbuck, Annabel Croft, Angela Rippon, Ernie Wise and Kenny Lynch.

Following Parkinson's death in August 2023, the club hosted the inaugural Sir Michael Parkinson Pro Celebrity Weekend in August 2024 in his honour.

== Ground ==
The club's main ground is located on the High Street in Bray, near Maidenhead, overlooked by the Church of St Michael and within walking distance of the River Thames. The ground is considered one of the most picturesque in the country. The clubhouse, known as The Pavilion at Bray, includes a bar, a function room called the River Room, and is used for corporate hospitality and events.

The lower XIs play on the Jubilee Ground, situated on the opposite side of the road from the main ground. The historic Old Field ground, which hosted historically important matches in the 1790s, was located on the Bray side of Chauntry Road but no longer exists, the site now being occupied by the Fisheries.

== League history ==
The club's six Saturday teams compete across the divisions of the Thames Valley Cricket League. The 1st XI earned promotion to Division 1 in 2026 after winning Division 2B in 2025.

Thames Valley Cricket League positions (2021–2025)
Team	2021	2022	2023	2024	2025
1st XI	Div 2A – 8th	Div 3B – 5th	Div 3B – 4th	Div 3B – 2nd	Div 2B – 1st
2nd XI	Div 4A – 5th	Div 4A – 6th	Div 5A – 4th	Div 4B – 1st	Div 3A – 9th
3rd XI	Div 7A – 9th	Div 7A – 9th	Div 7A – 7th	Div 7A – 4th	Div 7D – 5th
4th XI	Div 10B – 4th	Div 9A – 8th	Div 9A – 3rd	Div 8B – 7th	Div 8C – 2nd
5th XI	Div 10B – 9th	Div 10C – 7th	Div 10C – 6th	Div 10A – 7th	Div 10C – 6th
6th XI	Not entered				Div 10B – 4th

== Notable people ==
- Sir Michael Parkinson – president from 1987 until his death in 2023
- Nicholas Denning – head coach

== Bibliography ==
- Buckley, G. B. (1935). Fresh Light on 18th Century Cricket. Birmingham: Cotterell & Co. OCLC 23450280.
- Haygarth, Arthur (1996) [1862]. Scores & Biographies, Volume 1 (1744–1826). Kennington: Frederick Lillywhite. ISBN 978-19-00592-23-9.
- Waghorn, H. T. (2005) [1906]. The Dawn of Cricket. London: J. W. McKenzie. ISBN 978-09-47821-17-3.
