= Richard Purchase =

English cricketer

Richard Purchase (1757 – 1837) was an English cricketer who played for the Hambledon Club, making his debut aged 16 in 1773.

Born in Liss, Hampshire, he played for his county in 1773 and 1774 but then did not appear again until 1781. He was an all-rounder noted as a slow bowler who maintained good line and length and a "fair hitter". He played regularly from 1781 until the end of his career in 1803, making 113 known appearances.
