= William Bedster =

English cricketer

Personal information
- Born: 1734; Walberton, Chichester, Sussex
- Died: 1805 (aged 70–71)

Domestic team information
- Years: Team
- 1777–1792: England
- 1778–1792: Surrey
- 1787–1793: Middlesex

William Bedster (1734–1805) was an English cricketer who is known to have been active between 1777 and 1794.

Bedster was born in 1734 at Walberton near Chichester in Sussex. He made his first known appearance in 1777, playing for England (i.e., the "rest" of England) against Hampshire. He played for numerous teams, most frequently for England, Surrey, and Middlesex in matches.

Bedster was employed as a butler for five years by Charles Bennet, 4th Earl of Tankerville at his Mount Felix estate in Walton-on-Thames. During this time he played for Chertsey Cricket Club. He was frequently used as a given man by other teams. After his playing career was over, Bedster moved to Chelsea where he was an innkeeper. He died in 1805. A road in Molesey in Surrey is named after him.

== Bibliography ==
- Haygarth, Arthur (1996) [1862]. Scores & Biographies, Volume 1 (1744–1826). Kennington: Frederick Lillywhite. ISBN 978-19-00592-23-9.
