= Tom Taylor (Hampshire cricketer) =

English cricketer (1753–1806)

Thomas Taylor (18 October 1753 at Ropley, Hampshire – April 1806 at Alresford, Hampshire) was an English cricketer who played for Hampshire when the team was organised by the Hambledon Club. He also played for England, and made some appearances for Berkshire. Taylor was an all-rounder who was especially noted for his fielding skills. He is generally regarded as one of the most outstanding players of the 18th century. (Note: Scorecard data till at least 1825 was never comprehensive, especially the dismissal information: bowling analyses lacked balls bowled and runs conceded; bowlers were not credited with wickets when the batsman was caught or stumped; in many matches, the means of dismissal were omitted.)

== Career ==
Taylor made 105 known appearances from 1775 to 1798. (Note: There is a significant shortage of information about cricket matches until at least 1825. Many were not reported, or left no scorecard. The situation was exacerbated by the Lord's fire in 1825, which resulted in a huge loss of unique early records. It is therefore impossible to present a full biographical or statistical record of players who were active before 1826, so analysis and discussion are limited to their known match appearances only.)

In August 1786, Taylor and Tom Walker scored cricket's third and fourth known centuries. They did this in the same innings, when playing for White Conduit Club against Kent at Bishopsbourne Paddock. Taylor made 117, his highest known career score.

== Style and technique ==
It was said of Taylor (see Haygarth and Nyren in particular) that he was an "admirable" cover field and a strong thrower. As a batsman, he was a great hitter but "didn’t guard his wicket well enough" and had a tendency to cut at straight balls "like Beauclerk later". He was also an effective bowler and took many wickets, though we don't know what his pace was. Nyren commends Taylor on his fielding and says he was one of the best ever seen.

== Personal life ==
Taylor was another cricketing innkeeper. He had the Globe Inn at Alresford.

== Bibliography ==
- Haygarth, Arthur (1996) [1862]. Scores & Biographies, Volume 1 (1744–1826). Kennington: Frederick Lillywhite. ISBN 978-19-00592-23-9.
- Haygarth, Arthur (1997) [1862]. Scores & Biographies, Volume 2 (1827–1840). Kennington: Frederick Lillywhite. ISBN 978-19-00592-23-9.
- Nyren, John (1998) [1832]. Mote, Ashley (ed.). The Cricketers of my Time. London: Robson Publishing. ISBN 978-18-61051-68-4.
- Webber, Roy (1951). The Playfair Book of Cricket Records. London: Playfair Books Ltd. OCLC 753176177.
