= Joey Ring =

English cricketer

John "Little Joey" Ring (1758 at Darenth, Kent – 25 October 1800 at Bridge, Kent) was an English cricketer who played for Kent.

Joey Ring was one of Kent's best batsmen in the late 18th century and was employed by Sir Horatio Mann at Bourne as a huntsman. He originally came from the Dartford area.

He was noted for his play to leg and was a good single-wicket player.

Ring is believed to have been a cricketing fatality. It seems that his nose was broken in the summer of 1800 by a practice ball bowled by his brother George. Ring became ill and was bedridden for several weeks before dying on 25 October, evidently of a fever that developed as a result of his accident.

Joey Ring made 90 known appearances from 1782 until 1796 when he seems to have withdrawn from major matches.
