= Tom Walker (cricketer) =

English cricketer

Thomas Walker
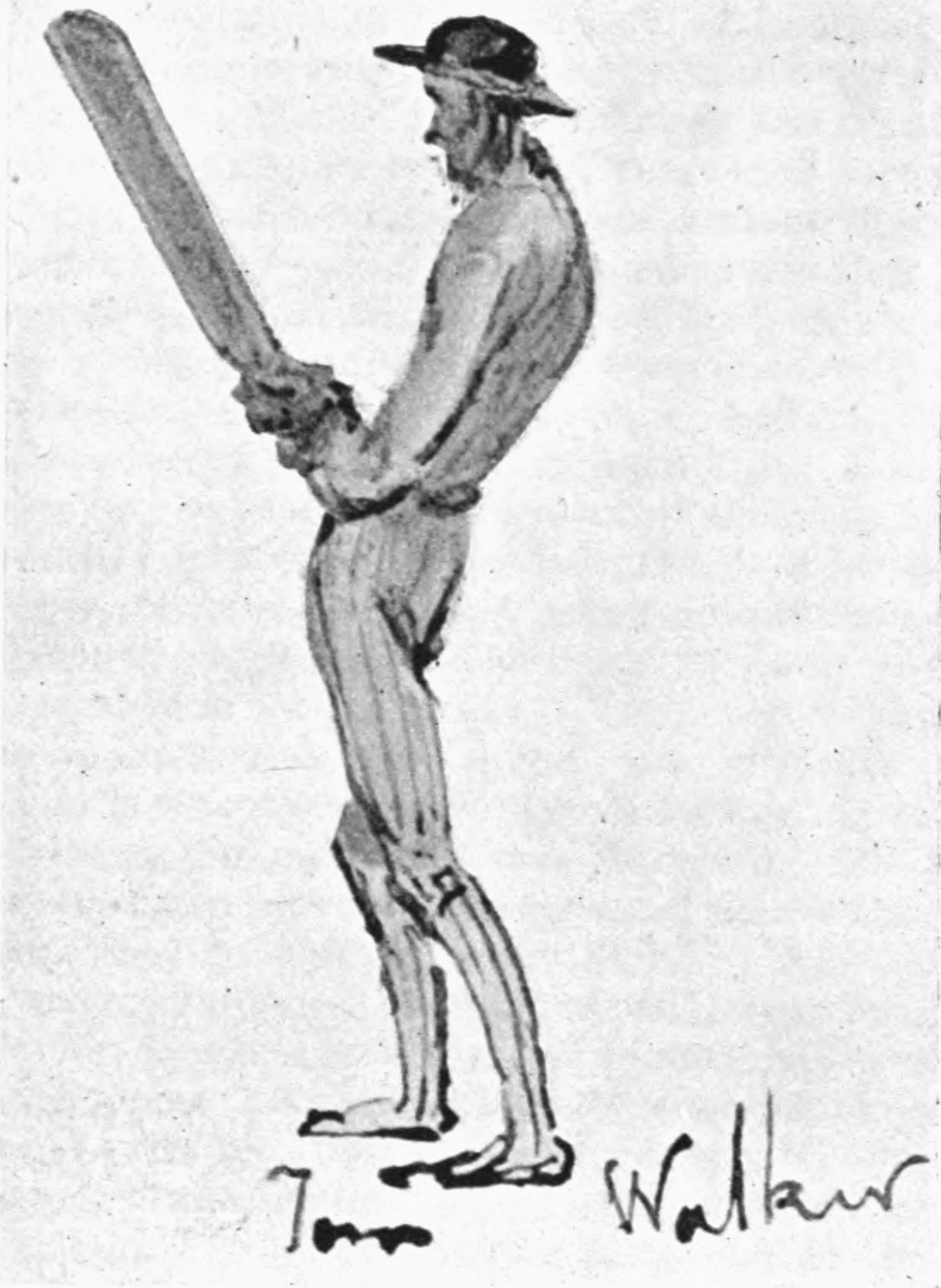
- Thomas Walker pictured in The Hambledon Men

Personal information
- Born: 16 November 1762; Churt, near Frensham, Surrey, England
- Died: 1 March 1831 (aged 68); Chiddingfold, Surrey, England
- Batting: Right-handed
- Bowling: Right-arm slow
- Role: All-rounder

Domestic team information
- Years: Team
- 1786–1795: Hampshire
- 1788–1810: Surrey
- 1792–1796: Middlesex

Thomas Walker (16 November 1762 – 1 March 1831) was an English cricketer who played for Hampshire in the days of the Hambledon Club and later for Surrey. He was famous for his brilliant defensive batting. He is also credited with introducing roundarm bowling, the predecessor of modern overarm bowling.

== Career ==
Walker was born in Churt, near Frensham, Surrey. Known as "Old Everlasting", he was one of the greatest batsmen of the late 18th century and was also a very useful bowler. He is believed to have been the originator of the roundarm bowling style. Legend has it that he and some of his fellow players in the "Hambledon Era" used to practise in a barn during the winters. Walker worked out that he could generate more bounce and variation of pace if he bowled with his arm away from his body and soon realised that these deliveries gave the batsman added problems. He failed to get the new style accepted during his career although he sowed the seeds of a bowling revolution that took place a generation later.

Walker was noted for his outstanding defensive play and was notoriously difficult to dismiss. On one occasion the frustrated bowler Lord Frederick Beauclerk is reported to have thrown down his hat and shouted: "You confounded old beast!" at Walker whose laconic response to his teammates afterwards was: "I don't care what he says".

On another occasion he faced 170 deliveries from David Harris and scored one run.

In a match at Bishopsbourne Paddock on 8–12 August 1786, playing for White Conduit Club versus Kent, Walker came very close to scoring two centuries in the match and would have been the first known achiever of this feat had he scored five more runs in his first innings. He made 95* and 102. White Conduit won the game by 164 runs.

Walker played for the Players in the inaugural and second Gentlemen v Players matches in 1806.

== Family ==
His brothers Harry, who was a very good player, and John, an occasional player, also represented Surrey.

Tom Walker died in Chiddingfold, Surrey.

== Bibliography ==
- H S Altham, A History of Cricket, Volume 1 (to 1914), George Allen & Unwin, 1962
- Derek Birley, A Social History of English Cricket, Aurum, 1999
- Arthur Haygarth, Scores & Biographies, Volume 1 (1744–1826), Lillywhite, 1862
- Ashley Mote, The Glory Days of Cricket, Robson, 1997
- John Nyren, The Cricketers of my Time (ed. Ashley Mote), Robson, 1998
