= Harry Walker (cricketer) =

English cricketer

Harry Walker (1760 – July 1805) was an English cricketer who played mainly for Surrey. He was a left-handed batsman who played from 1786 until 1802, making 101 appearances in important matches.

He was born at Churt, near Frensham in Surrey in 1760 and died at Brook near Witley also in Surrey in 1805. Walker was the elder brother of the great batsman Tom Walker, who is also credited with introducing roundarm bowling, the predecessor of modern overarm bowling.
