= Essex county cricket team (1732–1794) =

Historical English cricket team

Team information
- Established: by 1732
- Last match: 1794
- Home venue: Langton Park, Hornchurch

History
- Notable players: John Boorman

Between 1732 and 1794, the Essex county cricket team, always known as Essex, was organised by individual patrons and other groups, in particular the Hornchurch Cricket Club. Essex played historically important matches, some against other county teams, during that period. (Note: Any match listed in the ACS' Important Match Guide (1981) is historically important, and therefore of the highest standard, whether or not a scorecard might exist. The same applies to numerous matches discovered by researchers since 1981. For further information, see First-class cricket.)

After 1794, however, Essex was virtually absent from cricket records until January 1876, when the modern Essex County Cricket Club was founded.

== 18th century ==
=== Fulfilment of wagers ===
The first definite mention of cricket in connection with the county of Essex is a highly controversial match in 1724 between Chingford and Edwin Stead's XI, which is recorded in The Dawn of Cricket by H. T. Waghorn. The venue is unknown but, if it was at Chingford, it is also the earliest reference to cricket being played in Essex. The game echoed an earlier one in 1718 as the Chingford team refused to play to a finish when Stead's team had the advantage. A court case followed and, as in 1718, it was ordered that the match must be played out, presumably so that all wagers could be fulfilled. Lord Chief Justice Pratt presided over the case, and he ordered them to play it out on Dartford Brent, though it is not known if this was the original venue. The game was completed in 1726.

=== First Essex matches ===
The earliest reference to a team called Essex is in July 1732, when a combined Essex & Hertfordshire team played against London.

In July 1737, there was London v Essex at the Artillery Ground, London winning by 45 runs. In a return game at Ilford on 1 August 1737, Essex won by 7 runs, and this is the earliest known organised match that was definitely played in the county of Essex.

=== Hornchurch ===
References are then occasional until 1785 when the Hornchurch Cricket Club, based at Langton Park, became prominent. This club had a good team that was effectively representative of Essex as a county. However, the sources sometimes differed among themselves as to whether the team should be called Essex or Hornchurch. But there is no doubt that the team held historically important match status until 1794, after which the county abruptly disappeared from the records for a long time.

=== Players ===
Essex was largely reliant upon having given men to play for them in important matches. Among those who played for Essex, most of them as given men or guests, were John Boorman, George Boult Sr, Stephen Butcher, Thomas Clark, Robert Denn, William Fennex, Richard Francis, Thomas Ingram, John Littler, Michael Remington, Thomas Scott, John Stevens, and Richard Wyatt.

== 19th century ==
Little was heard of Essex cricket from 1794 until the formation of Essex County Cricket Club on 14 January 1876 at a meeting in the Shire Hall, Chelmsford. The new club did not achieve first-class status until 1894. The team played its inaugural match on 14, 15 & 16 May 1894 against Leicestershire (who were also making their debut) at Leyton. In 1895, both of these clubs and Warwickshire joined the County Championship.

== Bibliography ==
- ACS (1981). A Guide to Important Cricket Matches Played in the British Isles 1709–1863. Nottingham: ACS. OCLC 85045528.
- Buckley, G. B. (1935). Fresh Light on 18th Century Cricket. Birmingham: Cotterell & Co. OCLC 23450280.
- Waghorn, H. T. (2005) [1906]. The Dawn of Cricket. London: J. W. McKenzie. ISBN 978-09-47821-17-3.
