= William Fennex =

English cricketer

William Fennex (born c.1764 – 4 March 1838) was an English cricketer. A noted all-rounder and fast bowler, he is known to have played between 1784 and 1816.

As a batsman, Fennex is believed to be one of the first bat by moving forward towards the ball, aiming to play forward drives. As a bowler, at a time when only underarm bowling was permitted, he was said to have the highest delivery of anybody, "his hand, when propelling the ball, being nearly on a level with his shoulder".

Born at Gerrards Cross in Buckinghamshire in about 1764, Fennex began his working life as a blacksmith. He stood five feet ten inches tall and was described as "muscular and abstemious". He played for a number of teams from 1786, going on to play most frequently for England and Middlesex and was groundsman of the cricket ground at Uxbridge. He made 88 appearances, including playing in the inaugural Gentlemen v Players match in 1806. In total he scored 1,928 runs and took at least 145 wickets.

Fennex kept the Portman Arms inn at Marylebone for a time, and in old age was employed as a gardener and groundsman. Fennex died at Stepney in 1838.
