= White Conduit Club =

Historical English cricket team

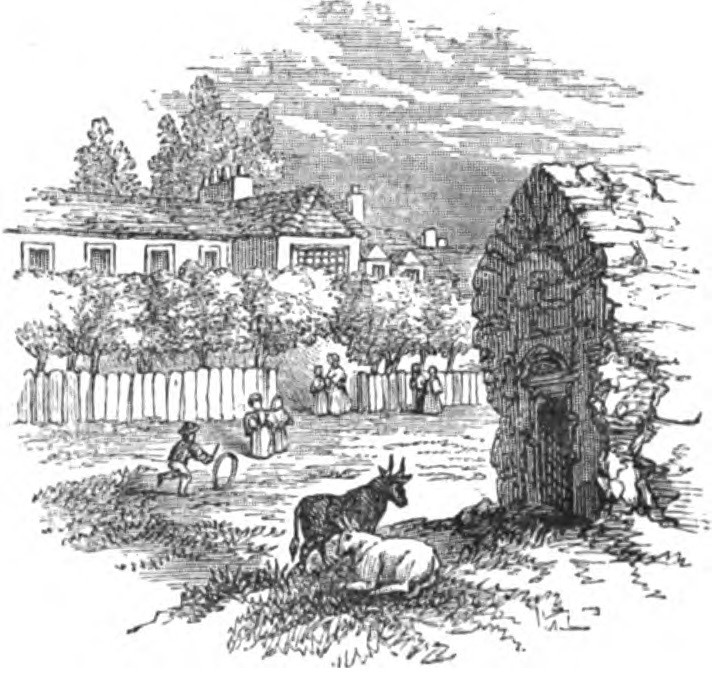
White Conduit House, and the conduit head from which it was named, 1827

The White Conduit Club (WCC) was a cricket club based on the northern fringes of London that existed from about 1782 until 1788. Although short-lived, it had considerable significance in the history of the game, as its members created the first Lord's venue and reorganised themselves as the new Marylebone Cricket Club (MCC).

The WCC took its name from White Conduit Fields in Islington, where it was based until 1787. It was essentially a gentlemen's club for those with amateur status but it employed professional cricketers who provided coaching for the members and sometimes played in the club's matches; one of these was the bowler Thomas Lord, after whom Lord's is named. The most significant members were Charles Lennox, 4th Duke of Richmond and George Finch, 9th Earl of Winchilsea who employed Lord to find a new, private venue for the club after complaints that White Conduit Fields was too open to the public.

Famous players who represented WCC include the professionals John Small, Lumpy Stevens, Tom Taylor and Tom Walker. Records of many WCC matches are known to have been lost when the Lord's Pavilion burned down in 1825 and details of only 13 matches between 1784 and 1788 are known today. (Note: Three of these matches involved combined WCC and Moulsey Hurst.)

== History ==
It is not known for certain when the WCC was founded but it seems to have been after 1780 and certainly by 1785. According to Pelham Warner, it was formed in 1782 as an offshoot from a West End club called the Je-ne-sais-quoi, some of whose members frequented the White Conduit House in Islington and played matches on the neighbouring White Conduit Fields. Arthur Haygarth commented in Scores and Biographies about a 1786 match that "there are only a few recorded matches of the White Conduit Club. The Marylebone Club was formed in 1787 from its members. The date of the formation of the White Conduit could not be found."

Although the club was formed as a gentlemen's club―its rules included one which said the "none but gentlemen ever to play"―professional players were hired to play in matches. The famous batsman Billy Beldham was hired while still a young professional in 1785 and in later life told James Pycroft, author of The Cricket Field (1851), that his farming employer concluded a deal with George Finch, 9th Earl of Winchilsea to allow Beldham time off his agricultural duties to go to the cricket ground at White Conduit Fields and play for Hampshire against England.

The White Conduit Club disappeared in the aftermath of MCC's founding, with the core of MCC being formed from WCC's members. White Conduit Fields also disappeared as London expanded and absorbed the village of Islington.

== Matches ==
Details of ten matches played by the club have been found.

Date	Match title	Venue	Result	Ref
22 May 1784	"A Great Cricket Match" (Note: It is almost certain that the 1784 matches involved the White Conduit Club but few details are known. The Earl of Winchilsea was noted as "the best bat" in the first game; a few players in the second game were named including Dorset, Winchilsea, Talbot and Lennox.)	White Conduit Fields	Unknown	
27 May 1784	"A Great Cricket Match"	White Conduit Fields	Unknown	
20 June 1785	Gentlemen of Kent v White Conduit Club	Sevenoaks Vine	The Gentlemen of Kent won by 104 runs	
30 June 1785	White Conduit Club v Gentlemen of Kent	White Conduit Fields	WCC won by 304 runs	
22 June 1786	White Conduit Club v Kent.	White Conduit Fields	WCC won by 5 runs	
8 August 1786	Kent v White Conduit Club	Bishopsbourne Paddock	WCC won by 164 runs	
21 May 1787	White Conduit Club v Middlesex (Note: This was the first match known to have been played on Lord's Old Ground.)	Lord's Old Ground	Unknown	
5 June 1787	White Conduit Club v Middlesex	Lord's Old Ground	WCC won	
14 June 1787	White Conduit Club v Middlesex	Lord's Old Ground	Middlesex won by 8 wickets	
20 June 1787	White Conduit Club v England	Lord's Old Ground	England won by 265 runs	
30 July 1787	Marylebone Cricket Club (MCC) v White Conduit Club	Lord's Old Ground	Unknown	
27 June 1788	MCC v White Conduit Club	Lord's Old Ground	MCC won by 83 runs	

As well as these matches, three matches were played in 1787 by a combined White Conduit Club and Moulsey Hurst against Hornchurch.

== Players ==
A total of 49 players are known to have appeared in senior matches for White Conduit, with Winchilsea, who played in seven matches, the most frequent. Sir Peter Burrell and John Dampier played in six matches, Gilbert East in five and Richard Newman, George Talbot, G. Drummond of Surrey and J. Wyatt of Essex all played in four.

== Bibliography ==
- Birley, Derek (1999) A Social History of English Cricket. London: Aurum Press. ISBN 978 1 78131 1769
- Buckley, G. B. (1935). Fresh Light on 18th Century Cricket. Cotterell.
- Haygarth, Arthur (1862). Scores & Biographies, Volume 1 (1744–1826). Lillywhite.
- Waghorn, H. T. (1906). The Dawn of Cricket. Electric Press.
- Warner, Pelham (1946). Lord's 1787–1945. Harrap.
