= Lord's Old Ground =

Former cricket venue in London

Coordinates: 51.5228°N 0.1610°W

Lord's Old Ground was a cricket venue in London that was established by Thomas Lord in 1787. It was used mainly by Marylebone Cricket Club for major matches until 1810, after which a dispute about rent caused Lord to relocate.

== Matches ==
The first match known to have been played at Lord's Old Ground was White Conduit Club v Middlesex on Monday 21 May 1787.

The first regular cricket fixture at Lord's which continues today was the annual Eton v Harrow match which was first played on the Old Ground in 1805.

The inaugural Gentlemen v Players match took place at the Old Ground in July 1806.

== Location ==
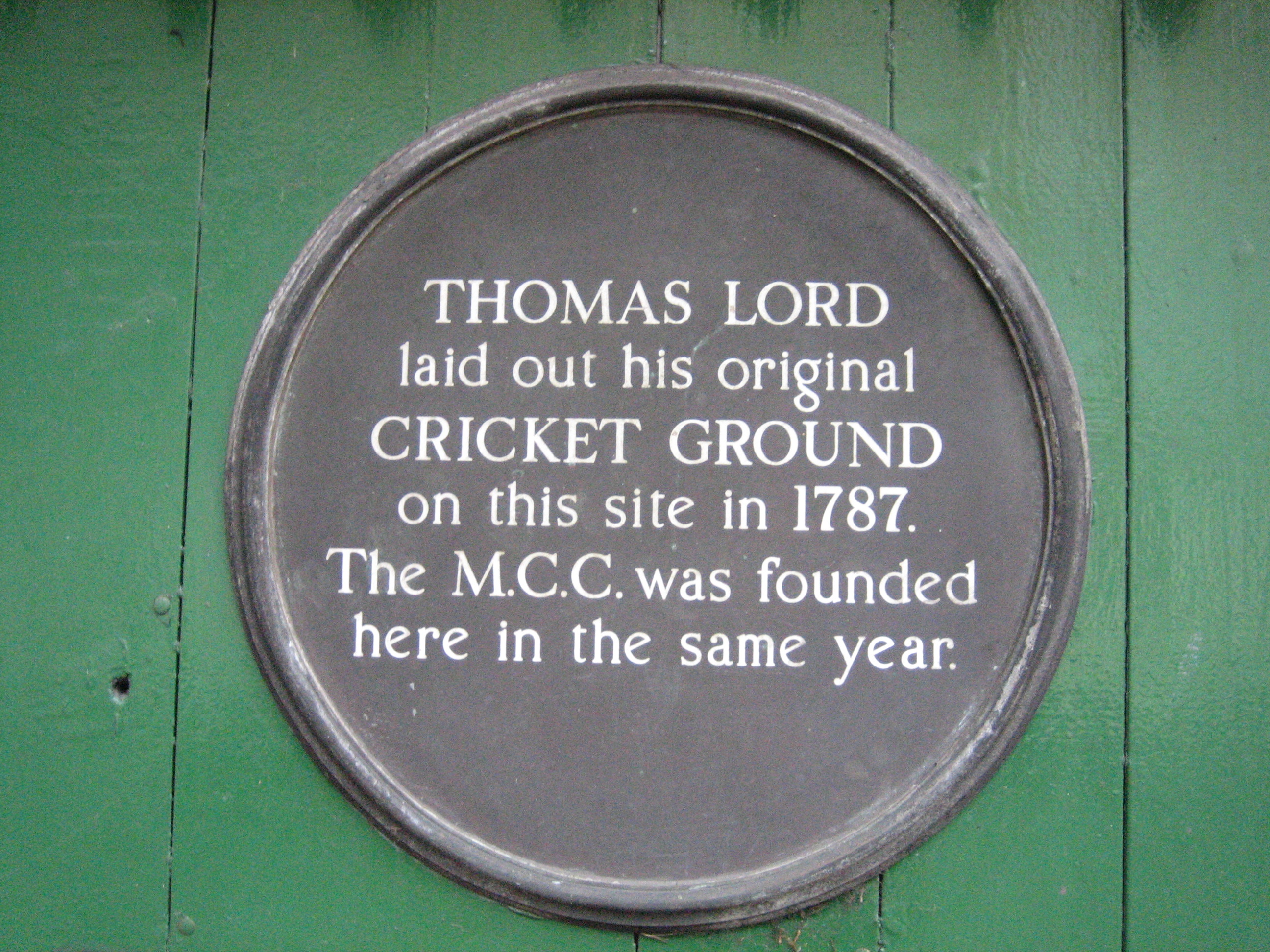
Commemorative plaque in Dorset Square

Lord's Old Ground was on the site of what is now Dorset Square.

Lord purchased another ground in 1811, Lord's Middle Ground, a site at Lisson Grove in the vicinity of Regent's Park which was unpopular and barely used and which was requisitioned for a canal cutting in 1814. He then leased the present Lord's Cricket Ground, formerly a duckpond in St John's Wood.

A commemorative plaque was unveiled in Dorset Square by Andrew Strauss on 9 May 2006.
