= Middlesex county cricket team (pre-1864) =

Historical English cricket team

Middlesex
Team information
- Established: by 1729
- Last match: 1863
- Home venue: Lamb's Conduit Field; Lord's Old Ground; Lord's

History
- Notable players: William Fennex; Thomas Lord; V. E. Walker

Until 1863, the Middlesex county cricket team, always known as Middlesex, was organised by individual patrons and other groups. The team has been traced back to 1729, although for long periods in the 18th century, the county was secondary to the London Cricket Club which played at the Artillery Ground. Middlesex played at various grounds throughout what is now the Greater London area. Venues in Islington and Uxbridge were often used, but some "home" matches were played on Kennington Common or in Berkshire.

Middlesex played even less frequently in the 19th century until 1859, when the Walker family of Southgate became involved in county cricket. Depending on the strength of the opposition, the Middlesex team played historically important matches (Note: Any match listed in the ACS' Important Match Guide (1981) is historically important, and therefore of the highest standard, whether or not a scorecard might exist. The same applies to numerous matches discovered by researchers since 1981. For further information, see First-class cricket.) from 1729 until the formation of Middlesex County Cricket Club on 15 December 1863.

== 17th century ==
As elsewhere in south east England, cricket became established in Middlesex during the 17th century, and the earliest village matches took place before the English Civil War. The first definite mention of cricket in London or Middlesex dates from 1680.

== 18th century ==
=== Venues ===
The earliest known match in Middlesex took place at Lamb's Conduit Field in Holborn on 3 July 1707, involving teams from London and Croydon. In 1718, the first reference is found to White Conduit Fields in Islington, which later became a famous London venue. The earliest reference to a team called Middlesex is on 5 August 1729, when there was a match between the "Gentlemen of Middlesex" and the Gentlemen of London "in the fields behind the Woolpack, in Islington, near Sadlers Wells, for £50 a side".

In 1730, there were three matches between Middlesex and Surrey, including the earliest known match on the Artillery Ground, which Middlesex won.

=== 1731 controversy ===
There was a much-publicised controversial incident on Monday, 23 August 1731, when Middlesex—also known as Thomas Chambers' XI on this occasion, as they were led by Thomas Chambers—played against the 2nd Duke of Richmond's XI, effectively the Sussex county team, in a match on Richmond Green. It was the return to a match in Chichester a week earlier. In both matches, the stake was 200 guineas. Middlesex won the first match. Chambers was a great-grandfather of Lord Frederick Beauclerk.

The second match is notable in one sense as the earliest of which the team scores are known: Richmond's XI 79, Middlesex 119; Richmond's XI 72, and Middlesex 23–5 (approximate). It was agreed beforehand that the match would end promptly at seven o'clock in the evening, and Richmond enforced this agreement even though the match had not started on time because he himself arrived late. The result was therefore a draw—the earliest known use of this term for a result.

The state of play at seven o'clock was that Middlesex needed only "about 8 to 10 notches" with either four or five wickets standing. Gambling was rife in eighteenth century cricket and, a large crowd in attendance, a lot of money was riding on a Middlesex win. There was uproar about the prompt finish making no allowance for the delayed start. When Richmond refused to play on, the crowd rioted and some of the Sussex players "had the shirts ripped off their backs". It was said a lawsuit "will commence about the play". On Wednesday, 8 September, the Daily Post Boy reported that "(on 6 September) 11 of Surrey beat the 11 who about a fortnight ago beat the Duke of Richmond's men". This would suggest that the Duke of Richmond conceded his controversial game against Chambers' Middlesex.

=== Middlesex at Lord's ===
Middlesex used Lord's Old Ground when it opened in 1787, with the earliest known match on the ground being between Middlesex and Essex on 31 May 1787. Noted Middlesex players in the 18th century included William Fennex and Thomas Lord.

== The Thursday Club ==
In May and June 1795, Marylebone Cricket Club (MCC) played five matches at Lord's Old Ground, the first three against a team called "the Thursday Club", and the last two against a team called "Middlesex". Although Arthur Haygarth makes no comment about the members of these two teams, it is evident that several players are common to both as James Rice (5 appearances), William Barton (4), James Beeston (4), John Goldham (4), Thomas Lord (4), Sylvester (4), Charles Warren (4), Harry Bridger (3) and Wheeler (2) all played for both the Thursday and Middlesex. N. Graham (2), Thomas Ray (2) and Robert Turner (2) played for Middlesex but not for Thursday; Ray also played once for MCC against Thursday. George Shepheard (3), W. Beeston (2) and Dale (2) played only for Thursday, and not for Middlesex. Six others, including Thomas Shackle, played for one of the teams in a single match only.

Details are sketchy but it seems the Marylebone Thursday Club was originally a Thursday Club in the literal sense that was started by amateur cricketers of Middlesex who acquired the services of certain Middlesex professionals, such as Ray and Sylvester who were both employed at Lord's as MCC ground staff players. Team nomenclature changed frequently in Georgian times. Samuel Britcher, who was the MCC scorer calls the team "Thursday Club" in the first three matches of 1795 (as does Haygarth) but then refers to "the County of Middlesex" in both the fourth and fifth games on 25 May and 26 June. Haygarth simply uses "Middlesex" for these two. Britcher refers to the "Middlesex Club" from 1796.

== 19th century ==
The present Middlesex County Cricket Club was informally founded on 15 December 1863 at a meeting in the London Tavern with formal constitution taking place on 2 February 1864. The creation of the club was largely through the efforts of the Walker family of Southgate. The county club played its first match against Sussex County Cricket Club at Islington in June 1864. (Note: There is an article on 19th century Middlesex cricket in the 14 September 1882 issue of Cricket: A Weekly Record of the Game, though mostly about the early years of the county club.)

== Bibliography ==
- ACS (1981). A Guide to Important Cricket Matches Played in the British Isles 1709–1863. Nottingham: ACS. OCLC 85045528.
- Britcher, Samuel (1795). A complete list of all the grand matches of cricket that have been played in the year 1795. London: Marylebone Cricket Club. OCLC 642467305.
- Britcher, Samuel (1796). A complete list of all the grand matches of cricket that have been played in the year 1796. London: Marylebone Cricket Club. OCLC 83522989.
- Buckley, G. B. (1935). Fresh Light on 18th Century Cricket. Birmingham: Cotterell & Co. OCLC 23450280.
- Haygarth, Arthur (1996) [1862]. Scores & Biographies, Volume 1 (1744–1826). Kennington: Frederick Lillywhite. ISBN 978-19-00592-23-9.
- Major, John (2007). More Than A Game. London: HarperCollins. ISBN 978-00-07183-64-7 – via Internet Archive.
- Maun, Ian (2009). From Commons to Lord's, Volume One: 1700 to 1750. Cambridge: Roger Heavens. ISBN 978-19-00592-52-9.
- McCann, Tim (2004). Sussex Cricket in the Eighteenth Century (PDF). Vol. 88. Lewes: West Sussex Record Office. ISBN 978-08-54450-55-8.
- Waghorn, H. T. (1899). Cricket Scores, Notes, &c. From 1730–1773. Edinburgh: Blackwood. OCLC 1086375331.
- Waghorn, H. T. (2005) [1906]. The Dawn of Cricket. London: J. W. McKenzie. ISBN 978-09-47821-17-3.
