= 1781 English cricket season =

Cricket season review

The earliest known mention of cricket in Lancashire occurred in the 1781 English season, and the Hambledon Club decided to abandon Broadhalfpenny Down. Details of thirteen historically important matches are known. (Note: Any match listed in the ACS' Important Match Guide (1981) is historically important, and therefore of the highest standard, whether or not a scorecard might exist. The same applies to numerous matches discovered by researchers since 1981. For further information, see First-class cricket.)

== Single wicket ==
A five-a-side single wicket match between England and Hambledon was played on Moulsey Hurst. Hambledon won by 78 runs. Hambledon had Lumpy Stevens as a given man, and he bowled four England batsmen. Noah Mann made the top score in the match (67), and also held five catches to dismiss half of England's players. The other Hambledon players were John Small, Tom Sueter, and Richard Aubrey Veck. England's players were James Aylward, William Bedster, William Bullen, Robert Clifford, and Joseph Miller. Bullen took six wickets in the match (all bowled). The actual date of the match is unknown.

== Hampshire v Kent ==
Hampshire played four matches against Kent between June and August. The venues were Itchin Stoke Down, Bishopsbourne Paddock (twice), and the last-ever important match on Broadhalfpenny Down. The teams won two matches each. There were outstanding performances by several players including Lamborn, Noah Mann, James Aylward, Tom Sueter, Robert Clifford, and William Bullen.

== Dorset's XI v Mann's XI ==
The Duke of Dorset and Sir Horatio Mann arranged two matches between their own teams. As was often the case in the 18th century, team nomenclature varied from match to match. Dorset's team was either the Duke of Dorset's XI or West Kent; Mann's team was either Sir Horatio Mann's XI or East Kent.

The first match was in June on Sevenoaks Vine, where Dorset's XI won by 10 wickets. The second was in August at Bishopsbourne Paddock. Dorset's XI won again, this time by 106 runs, after Tom Sueter had made two half-centuries in the match with 58 and 56. Lumpy Stevens took four wickets (bowled only) in each of the East Kent innings.

== Leicester v Nottingham ==
A match between Leicester and Nottingham took place at an unspecified venue in Loughborough on 17 and 18 September. It was reported in the Leicester Journal on Saturday, 22 September. Nottingham scored 50 and 73; Leicester had scored 73 and 9/2 when the game ended prematurely because of a dispute about wide deliveries. The repercussions dragged on and the dispute remained unresolved a year later.

In early August, Leicester had played against Melton Mowbray on Barrowcliffe Meadow in Leicester. Melton Mowbray won by 16 runs.

== Berkshire ==
Four matches involved teams from Berkshire. Maidenhead played Odiham twice in July, and both matches were won by Odiham. Maidenhead then played against Buckinghamshire in August, and won by 124 runs. In September, there was an inter-county match on Benson Common between Oxfordshire and Berkshire, but the result is unknown.

== Other events ==
A match on Brinnington Moor in August is the earliest known reference to cricket being played in the counties of Cheshire and Lancashire. The match between two parish teams was reported in the Manchester Journal on Saturday, 1 September.

Broadhalfpenny Down had been the Hambledon Club's chosen venue for at least 25 years. The Duke of Dorset supposedly commented that it was 'a bleak place to play cricket', and others agreed. The Down is actually two miles from the village of Hambledon, and it is uphill. Deciding that it was too remote, the club's members decided that Windmill Down, adjacent to the village, would be a more suitable venue.

== First mentions ==
=== Clubs and teams ===
- East Kent
- Leicester
- Leicestershire & Rutland
- Melton Mowbray
- Odiham

=== Counties ===
- Cheshire
- Lancashire

=== Players ===
- Hogben (Kent)
- J. Martin (Essex)
- Michael Remington (Kent)
- T. Skinner (Hampshire)
- Webb (Kent)

=== Venues ===
- Barrowcliffe Meadow
- Benson Common
- Loughborough (unspecified)

== Bibliography ==
- ACS (1981). A Guide to Important Cricket Matches Played in the British Isles 1709–1863. Nottingham: ACS. OCLC 85045528.
- Birley, Derek (1999). A Social History of English Cricket. London: Aurum Press. ISBN 978-18-54107-10-7 – via Internet Archive.
- Bowen, Rowland (1970). Cricket: A History of its Growth and Development. London: Eyre & Spottiswoode. ISBN 978-04-13278-60-9.
- Buckley, G. B. (1935). Fresh Light on 18th Century Cricket. Birmingham: Cotterell & Co. OCLC 23450280.
- Buckley, G. B. (1937). Fresh Light on pre-Victorian Cricket. Birmingham: Cotterell & Co. OCLC 23469107.
- Haygarth, Arthur (1996) [1862]. Scores & Biographies, Volume 1 (1744–1826). Kennington: Frederick Lillywhite. ISBN 978-19-00592-23-9.
- Waghorn, H. T. (2005) [1906]. The Dawn of Cricket. London: J. W. McKenzie. ISBN 978-09-47821-17-3.
