= 1780 English cricket season =

Cricket season review

Several games in the 1780 English cricket season were between teams selected by John Sackville, 3rd Duke of Dorset and Sir Horatio Mann. Duke & Son of Penshurst made the first-ever six-seam cricket ball. Details of seven historically important eleven-a-side matches are known. (Note: Any match listed in the ACS' Important Match Guide (1981) is historically important, and therefore of the highest standard, whether or not a scorecard might exist. The same applies to numerous matches discovered by researchers since 1981. For further information, see First-class cricket.)

== Single wicket ==
On 2 September, there was a single wicket "fives" match at Bishopsbourne Paddock between Five of Kent (with William Bedster) and Five of the Hambledon Club (with Lumpy Stevens). The other Kent players were James Aylward, William Bullen, Robert Clifford, and Joseph Miller. The rest of the Hambledon team were Noah Mann, John Small, Tom Sueter, and Richard Aubrey Veck. The match was drawn as only one innings each could be completed, presumably because of bad weather. Hambledon scored 23, Kent 22.

== Dorset v Mann ==
The friendly rivalry between the Duke of Dorset and Sir Horatio Mann increased considerably in 1780, as they arranged several matches between their own teams, always for high stakes. However, only two of the matches have known outcomes. One was played 27 and 28 June on Sevenoaks Vine, where Mann's XI won by 7 wickets. By this time, James Aylward was living in Kent, and working on Mann's estate. He was also a fixture in Mann's cricket team. In this match, he made the top score of 47. Dorset's XI scored 93 and 92; Mann's XI scored 105 (Aylward 47) and 81/3.

The other match with known information was played 21 to 23 August at Bishopsbourne Paddock. This time, Dorset's XI won by 14 runs. They scored 97 and 163 against 149 and 97 by Mann's XI.

== England v Hampshire ==
Towards the end of the season, there were two matches between England and Hampshire.

England won the first, played 31 August and 1 September at Bishopsbourne Paddock, by 165 runs. They made 197 and 144 against 80 and 96 by Hampshire. William Yalden and Robert Clifford were outstanding. Yalden scored 52 and 34; Clifford took seven wickets in the match (bowled only).

The return match, 20 to 22 September on Itchin Stoke Down, featured an outstanding performance by Lumpy Stevens which enabled England to win by 51 runs. England scored 179 (Miller 50, Clifford 33*, Lumpy 31) and 101. In reply, Hampshire scored 169 (Lumpy 4w) and 60 (Lumpy 6w). So, besides a useful score of 31, Lumpy achieved a 10wM which included his bowled victims only.

== Other events ==
Duke & Son of Penshurst made the first-ever six-seam cricket ball.

There were three matches in which Alresford Cricket Club played a combined Alton & Odiham team. Alresford won the first on Odiham Down by 6 wickets, and Alton & Odiham won the other two by margins of 100 runs and 10 runs, at The Nythe and Odiham Down respectively. Hampshire players Richard Aubrey Veck and Tom Taylor played for Alresford in these games, and Noah Mann for their opponents. The Alton & Odiham teams included players called Beldam (sic) and Wells. Wells may have been James, elder brother of John Wells, while Beldam could have been George Beldham, the elder brother of Billy Beldham, who was still only 14 in 1780.

A single innings match took place 8 August between Maidenhead and Chertsey. The venue was Priestwood Common. Maidenhead won by 5 runs. A handful of Maidenhead's players in this game later played for Berkshire.

== First mentions ==
=== Clubs and teams ===
- Alton & Odiham

=== Players ===
- John Freemantle (Hampshire)
- Gibson (Kent)
- Benjamin Remington (Kent)
- Thomas Remington (Kent)

=== Venues ===
- The Nythe
- Priestwood Common

== Bibliography ==
- ACS (1981). A Guide to Important Cricket Matches Played in the British Isles 1709–1863. Nottingham: ACS. OCLC 85045528.
- Bowen, Rowland (1970). Cricket: A History of its Growth and Development. London: Eyre & Spottiswoode. ISBN 978-04-13278-60-9.
- Buckley, G. B. (1937). Fresh Light on pre-Victorian Cricket. Birmingham: Cotterell & Co. OCLC 23469107.
- Haygarth, Arthur (1996) [1862]. Scores & Biographies, Volume 1 (1744–1826). Kennington: Frederick Lillywhite. ISBN 978-19-00592-23-9.
- Waghorn, H. T. (2005) [1906]. The Dawn of Cricket. London: J. W. McKenzie. ISBN 978-09-47821-17-3.
