= 1779 English cricket season =

Cricket season review

Berkshire began to emerge as an important team in the 1779 English cricket season, a status they enjoyed for several years. Details of ten historically important eleven-a-side matches are known. (Note: Any match listed in the ACS' Important Match Guide (1981) is historically important, and therefore of the highest standard, whether or not a scorecard might exist. The same applies to numerous matches discovered by researchers since 1981. For further information, see First-class cricket.)

== Berkshire ==
In the final years of the 18th century, Berkshire was one of the leading county teams. Signs of their emergence were becoming apparent in 1779, beginning with a match in Maidenhead on 12 July. A team called the Berkshire Club (probably the Maidenhead Cricket Club) played against a combined Berkshire & Hampshire team. It was announced a week earlier in the Reading Mercury, but the result is unknown.

Next, on an unknown date in August, Berkshire travelled to Odiham Down for a match against Alresford. Again, the result is unknown. The Reading Mercury announced on the 9th that the match would be "some time in August". It said Alresford would combine with "some of the Hambledon Club against "the County of Berkshire with the Maidenhead Club".

Much later in the season, There was a match at Henley between Berkshire and "the County of Oxford" for £25 a side. This is one of the earliest references to cricket in Oxfordshire, outside of the University of Oxford.

== Single wicket ==
The Artillery Ground had staged its last big eleven-a-side matches in 1778, but it was the venue in 1779 for a single wicket "fives" match between the teams of John Sackville, 3rd Duke of Dorset and Sir Horatio Mann. This was played over two days—7 and 8 June—and Dorset's Five won by one wicket. Dorset's team was James Aylward, William Brazier, Samuel Colchin, Constantine Phillips, and Polden. Mann's team was Joseph Miller, William Bedster, William Bullen, Robert Clifford, and one of Richard or Thomas May. This was reported in the Morning Post next day.

== Surrey v Kent ==
Kent played Surrey at Bishopsbourne Paddock from 21 to 24 July, but the match was badly affected by rain, and finally abandoned as a draw. All bets were declared void. Surrey had scored 62 and Kent had replied with 83/8 when the rain intervened. Kent had two given men from Hampshire who were apparently Richard Aubrey Veck and James Aylward.

There was a return match, 9 to 11 August, on Laleham Burway. Kent won by 5 wickets. Veck, who had his best season as a runscorer, was again a given man for Kent, and he scored 55 of Kent's 141 in the first innings.

== England v Hampshire ==
England played four matches against Hampshire between June and September. All four were won by Hampshire. In the first, played 14 to 15 June on Itchin Stoke Down, they won by 6 wickets. They won the second, played 23 to 26 June on Sevenoaks Vine, by an innings and 89 runs. In that match, England were dismissed for 56 and 87, Noah Mann taking three all-bowled wickets in each innings. Hampshire scored 232, thanks to half-centuries by Veck (79) and Mann (56). Lamborn was playing as a given man for England, and achieved a 5wI by bowling out five Hampshire batters.

The third match was played 23 August on Broadhalfpenny Down, and Hampshire won by 134 runs. The final match was played 13 to 16 September on Moulsey Hurst, and Hampshire won by 2 wickets.

== First mentions ==
=== Clubs and teams ===
- Berkshire & Hampshire
- Oxfordshire (18th century)

=== Players ===
- Berwick (Surrey and Hampshire)

=== Venues ===
- Odiham Down

== Bibliography ==
- ACS (1981). A Guide to Important Cricket Matches Played in the British Isles 1709–1863. Nottingham: ACS. OCLC 85045528.
- Buckley, G. B. (1935). Fresh Light on 18th Century Cricket. Birmingham: Cotterell & Co. OCLC 23450280.
- Haygarth, Arthur (1996) [1862]. Scores & Biographies, Volume 1 (1744–1826). Kennington: Frederick Lillywhite. ISBN 978-19-00592-23-9.
