= 1788 English cricket season =

Cricket season review

In the 1788 English cricket season, Marylebone Cricket Club (MCC) published a revised code of the Laws of Cricket, thereby confirming itself as the body in sole charge of the Laws, and taking responsibility for the sport's governance. MCC was then called "The Cricket Club at St. Marylebone", contrasting with its predecessor, the White Conduit Club of Islington, which remained active in 1788. As in 1787, their two teams played against each other at Lord's. (Note: There have been three grounds called Lord's. The first, now known as Lord's Old Ground, was opened by Thomas Lord in May 1787. It was MCC's home ground until 1810 when Lord quit the site because of a rent dispute. The Old Ground was where modern Dorset Square is located. Lord established a new ground at North Bank, near St John's Wood. This is now known as Lord's Middle Ground and it was only in use for three years. Lord and MCC were forced to relocate again after the land was requisitioned for the cutting of the Regent's Canal. In 1814, Lord opened the current Lord's Cricket Ground on the site of a former duckpond in St John's Wood.) A total of fifteen historically important eleven-a-side match scorecards have survived, and there are brief newspaper mentions of five other matches, including two played under single wicket rules. (Note: Any match listed in the ACS' Important Match Guide (1981) is historically important, and therefore of the highest standard, whether or not a scorecard might exist. The same applies to numerous matches discovered by researchers since 1981. For further information, see First-class cricket.)

== MCC ==
=== Laws of Cricket revised ===
Marylebone Cricket Club (MCC) formally revised the Laws of Cricket in a meeting on 30 May. The leg before wicket (lbw) Law no longer mentioned the batsman's intention:

(The striker is out) if with his foot or leg he stops the ball, which the bowler, in the opinion of the umpire at the bowler's wicket,
shall have pitched in straight line to the wicket, and would have hit it.

Another change was the provision that no run is allowed when the batsman is caught. This had been one of the rules in the 1727 Articles of Agreement which said: "When a Ball is caught out, the Stroke counts nothing". The 1788 version ended with a section called "Bets", an attempt to regulate gambling at cricket matches.

=== Marylebone Cricket Club v White Conduit Club ===
Played 27 June at Lord's. MCC won by 83 runs.

This is the earliest match involving an MCC team to leave a surviving scorecard and so, although it was "gentlemen only", it is of great historical importance. It is also the last match in which a White Conduit team is known to have taken part, and so the merger of the two clubs may have been completed soon afterwards. Haygarth in S&B says that although "this is the first recorded Marylebone match", there can be no doubt a few had "come off" previously. He explains his view by reference to the Lord's pavilion fire in 1825 which caused the loss of "many old scores and other valuable records". MCC scored 62 and 124; White Conduit 42 and 61. Gilbert East of MCC bowled nine in the match; the highest runscorers were Peter Burrell (14 and 33) and George Talbot (20* and 31), both of MCC.

== England matches ==
There were four matches involving teams called England. (Note: Teams called England had been formed since the 1730s. They were by no means international or even national. Cricket in the 18th century was mostly confined to the south-eastern counties around London, and England of the time consisted of players from these counties. The teams were in the nature of "Rest of England" and were formed to play against a strong club or county team.)

=== Hampshire v England ===
Played 17–18 June at Itchin Stoke Down, near Alresford. Hampshire won by an innings and 76 runs.

=== England v Hampshire ===
Played 24–25 July at Sevenoaks Vine. Hampshire won by 53 runs. John Crawte, playing for England, made his first known appearance.

=== Kent v England ===
Played 29–31 July at Coxheath Common, England won by an innings and 80 runs. George Louch, who was from Chatham and usually played for Kent, took six catches in the match for England. The ACS Guide has this game on 22–24 July which means it would have clashed with the Sevenoaks game above that featured most of the same players. S&B has the game on 29–31 July and these dates seem the more likely.

=== England VI v Hampshire VI (single wicket) ===
Played 21–22 August at Lord's. Hampshire won by 5 wickets. England scored 8 and 19; Hampshire 24 and 4/1. David Harris bowled eight and caught one of the twelve England wickets.

== Inter-county matches ==
=== Hampshire v Surrey (Moulsey Hurst) ===
Played 9–10 June at Moulsey Hurst. Surrey won by 9 wickets. Surrey bowlers Lumpy Stevens and Stephen Butcher dismissed Hampshire for 59 and 63.

=== Essex v Surrey ===
Played 13 June at Langton Park, Hornchurch. Result unknown.

Both teams were listed in full by the newspaper which announced the match but there is no surviving scorecard and the result is unknown. The teams were called Hornchurch and Moulsey Hurst in the newspaper. The stake was 500 guineas. The announcement included the warning: "No dogs admitted in the field".

=== Hampshire v Surrey (Perriam Down) ===
Played 2–4 July at Perriam Down, Ludgershall. Hampshire won by 4 wickets.

=== Hampshire v Surrey (Odiham Down) ===
Played 14 July at Odiham Down. Result unknown. The match was briefly pre-announced a week earlier for a stake of 100 guineas. No scorecard or other details have survived.

=== Surrey v Kent ===
Played 15–18 July at Moulsey Hurst. Surrey won by an innings and 65 runs. Tom Walker top-scored for Surrey with 93*. It is believed he opened and so he carried his bat.

=== Kent v Surrey ===
Played 5–7 August at Bishopsbourne Paddock. Surrey won by 37 runs.

=== Hampshire v Surrey (Windmill Down) ===
Played 13–15 August at Windmill Down. Hampshire won by 4 wickets. Andrew Freemantle made his first known appearance in senior cricket for Hampshire.

=== Kent VI v Hampshire VI (single wicket) ===
Played 29 August to 3 September at Bishopsbourne Paddock. Hampshire won by 6 runs. The match was six-a-side and took six days to complete. Hampshire scored 25 and 17; Kent 4 and 32.

=== London v Middlesex ===
Played 15–17 September at an unknown venue. London won by 68 runs. The team totals are known but there is no other surviving information. There is no certainty of any connection between this London team, which was possibly an ad hoc one, and the famous London Cricket Club which may have disbanded before 1788. London scored 174 and 38; Middlesex 81 and 63.

== Other matches ==
=== Earl of Winchilsea's XI v Sir Horatio Mann's XI ===
Played 26–28 May at Lord's. The Earl of Winchilsea's XI won by 106 runs. David Harris, playing for Mann's XI, took ten wickets (bowled) in the match.

=== Surrey v Windsor Forest ===
Played 4 June at Warfield, Windsor Forest won by 206 runs.

=== Charles Powlett's XI v Gilbert East's XI ===
Played 5–7 June at Lord's. Powlett's XI won by 25 runs. George Louch, noted for his close fielding skills, took five catches for East's XI.

=== Earl of Winchilsea's XI v T. A. Smith's XI ===
Played 9–11 July at Perriam Down. T. A. Smith's XI won by 3 wickets. There is no surviving scorecard for this match between two scratch teams whose patrons wagered 500 guineas.

=== Sir Horatio Mann's XI v Earl of Winchilsea's XI ===
Played 26–29 August at Bishopsbourne Paddock. Mann's XI won by 75 runs.

=== Leicester v Coventry ===
Played 22 Sept at Lutterworth. Leicester won by 28 runs. The source provides an extensive description of this match, between two town clubs. It was marred by dispute.

== Other events ==
A partial score exists of a game between Eastbourne and Alfriston that was played on or about 26 July.

== Bibliography ==
- ACS (1981). A Guide to Important Cricket Matches Played in the British Isles 1709–1863. Nottingham: ACS. OCLC 85045528.
- Bowen, Rowland (1970). Cricket: A History of its Growth and Development. London: Eyre & Spottiswoode. ISBN 978-04-13278-60-9.
- Buckley, G. B. (1935). Fresh Light on 18th Century Cricket. Birmingham: Cotterell & Co. OCLC 23450280.
- Buckley, G. B. (1937). Fresh Light on pre-Victorian Cricket. Birmingham: Cotterell & Co. OCLC 23469107.
- Haygarth, Arthur (1996) [1862]. Scores & Biographies, Volume 1 (1744–1826). Kennington: Frederick Lillywhite. ISBN 978-19-00592-23-9.
- Waghorn, H. T. (1899). Cricket Scores, Notes, &c. From 1730–1773. Edinburgh: Blackwood. OCLC 1086375331.
- Waghorn, H. T. (2005) [1906]. The Dawn of Cricket. London: J. W. McKenzie. ISBN 978-09-47821-17-3.
- Warner, Pelham (1946). Lords: 1787–1945. London: Harrap. OCLC 877106024.
