= 1783 English cricket season =

Cricket season review

In the 1783 English cricket season, the Whitehall Evening Post reported on Tuesday, 8 July that "the 3rd Duke of Dorset’s cricketing establishment, exclusive of any betting or consequential entertainment, is said to exceed £1000 a year", a colossal sum at the time. A portrait of Lumpy Stevens was probably painted this year. The famous portrait is at Knole House, seat of the Duke of Dorset in Sevenoaks. Details of eleven historically important matches are known. (Note: Any match listed in the ACS' Important Match Guide (1981) is historically important, and therefore of the highest standard, whether or not a scorecard might exist. The same applies to numerous matches discovered by researchers since 1981. For further information, see First-class cricket.)

== Hampshire matches ==
Hampshire played three known important matches during the season: two against Kent and one against England.

=== Hampshire v Kent (Windmill Down) ===
Hampshire met Kent on 8 and 9 July at Windmill Down. The match was recorded as a tie, with both teams scoring 202 runs. While earlier tied matches are known to have taken place, this is the earliest for which a detailed scorecard has survived.

The result was later disputed. According to Arthur Haygarth, Kent may in fact have won the match, but an error by the scorer affected the final total. Haygarth said:

Kent actually won the match. It was discovered afterwards that Pratt, the scorer, whose method (which was the usual one at that time) was to cut a notch on a stick for every run, and to cut every tenth notch longer, in order to count the whole more expeditiously, had, by mistake, marked in one place the eleventh notch instead of the tenth. The stick was afterwards produced; but the other scorer could not or would not produce his.

Hampshire batted first and scored 140 runs, with Tom Taylor making 51 and Tom Sueter 42. William Bullen took four wickets for Kent. Kent replied with 111, giving Hampshire a first-innings lead of 29 runs. Hampshire added 62 in their second innings to reach a match total of 202. Kent were dismissed for 91 while chasing 92 to win, leaving the scores level.

=== Hampshire v Kent (Bishopsbourne Paddock) ===
The return match was played at Bishopsbourne Paddock between 6 and 9 August, and Hampshire won by 85 runs. Four batters made half-centuries: John Small (52) and Tom Taylor (66) for Hampshire; Joey Ring (82) and William Bedster (61) for Kent. Lumpy Stevens took five wickets, all bowled, in Kent's first innings.

=== Hampshire v England ===
Between 26 and 29 August, Hampshire played England at Windmill Down. Persistent bad weather prevented the completion of the match, which was abandoned without a result.

== Single wicket ==
Six of Hambledon played against Six of England between 16 and 19 September on Bishopsbourne Paddock. Hambledon won by 31 runs.

== Other events ==
Odiham and Maidenhead played each other twice, Odiham winning both games.

The Duke of Dorset's XI played Sir Horatio Mann's XI at Sevenoaks Vine in June. The match was also called West Kent v East Kent. The teams were weaker than usual, and 'Lumpy was not to bowl, by agreement'. Lumpy was a given man on Dorset's team. Mann's XI won by 2 wickets.

In September, Chertsey played Berkshire on Laleham Burway. Tom Taylor was a given man for Berkshire, and scored 93 out of 179. Of the 22 players involved, only seven are known to have had significant careers. Berkshire won by 10 wickets.

Also in September, Nottingham played Melton Mowbray twice, winning the first match by 4 wickets, and the second by 13 runs. The second match was played in Nottingham, and a newspaper report mentions 'a Close near Trent Bridge' as the venue. This was over 60 years before William Clarke opened the Trent Bridge Cricket Ground.

== First mentions ==
=== Players ===
- Stephen Amherst (Kent)
- Couchman (Kent)
- Richard Lawrence (Berkshire)
- Thompson (Berkshire)
- James Wells (Surrey)

== Bibliography ==
- ACS (1981). A Guide to Important Cricket Matches Played in the British Isles 1709–1863. Nottingham: ACS. OCLC 85045528.
- Buckley, G. B. (1935). Fresh Light on 18th Century Cricket. Birmingham: Cotterell & Co. OCLC 23450280.
- Haygarth, Arthur (1996) [1862]. Scores & Biographies, Volume 1 (1744–1826). Kennington: Frederick Lillywhite. ISBN 978-19-00592-23-9.
- Waghorn, H. T. (2005) [1906]. The Dawn of Cricket. London: J. W. McKenzie. ISBN 978-09-47821-17-3.
