= Stephen Butcher (cricketer) =

English cricketer (c.1765–?)

Stephen Butcher (c.1765–?) was an English cricketer of the late 18th century. A top-class player, he was one of the outstanding professional bowlers of the period. (Note: Scorecard data till at least 1825 was never comprehensive, especially the dismissal information: bowling analyses lacked balls bowled and runs conceded; bowlers were not credited with wickets when the batsman was caught or stumped; in many matches, the means of dismissal were omitted.) Butcher is known to have played in at least 28 historically important matches between 1787 and 1793. (Note: Any match listed in the ACS' Important Match Guide (1981) is historically important, and therefore of the highest standard, whether or not a scorecard might exist. The same applies to numerous matches discovered by researchers since 1981. For further information, see First-class cricket.)

== Career ==
Butcher played for several teams, though mostly for Surrey. He may also have been engaged by both the White Conduit Club (WCC) and Marylebone Cricket Club (MCC) as a ground staff bowler, and he did play for both teams on a few occasions.

=== First known match ===
He is first recorded in the 1787 season when he played for a White Conduit Club & Moulsey Hurst combine against Hornchurch. This match was played 15/16 May at Langton Park. The combined team won by 6 wickets. Butcher shared the bowling with Lumpy Stevens. In the Hornchurch first innings, he held one catch to dismiss John Boorman for 12, and bowled Michael Remington for 2. Lumpy took five wickets, and Hornchurch were dismissed for 46. WCC scored 117 in reply (George Boult 62), for a first innings lead of 71. Hornchurch scored 118 in their second innings, Butcher bowling five and Lumpy four. Having scored 3 in the first innings, Butcher was 2* in the second as WCC made 18/4 to win. In a footnote to the match scorecard, CricketArchive says:

Butcher—note his consistent record as a bowler in most matches in which he appears.

In Butcher's next match, Middlesex v Essex at Lord's Old Ground on 31 May and 1 June, he played for Essex as a given man, and took ten wickets in the match with five in each innings (NB: these were his bowled victims only; the bowler was not credited with wickets falling to catches). His known total of wickets for the 1787 season was 24, and only the great David Harris with 29 had more.

=== 1788 season ===
Kent played Surrey at Bishopsbourne Paddock from 5 to 7 August. Butcher held two catches to dismiss James Aylward and William Bullen. He may not have bowled because Surrey had David Harris as a given man, and he shared the bowling with Lumpy. Surrey won by 37 runs.

The fixture was repeated in August, again at Bishopsbourne Paddock, Surrey winning by 9 wickets. Butcher played but was not credited with any wickets.

=== 1790 season ===
Butcher is recorded in four matches this season as "Butcher, Esq.", although he was certainly a professional player; in other seasons, he was always recorded by his surname only. The first game was between Hornchurch/Essex and MCC at Langton Park on 5/6 July. It was pre-announced in the Chelmsford Chronicle on 25 June with the names of 22 players. However, four of the named players did not take part, and Butcher was one of those brought in to play for the MCC team, which was led by the Earl of Winchilsea.

=== 1791 season ===
On 2/3 June, Butcher played for Kent against MCC at Lord's Old Ground. Kent were all out for 39, and MCC replied with 240. Butcher bowled George Louch for 24, and William Fennex for 53. The top-scorer was Billy Beldham with 57. 201 runs behind, Kent were dismissed for 88 in their second innings, Butcher being the not out batsman with 15. MCC won by an innings and 113 runs.

== Bibliography ==
- ACS (1981). A Guide to Important Cricket Matches Played in the British Isles 1709–1863. Nottingham: ACS. OCLC 85045528.
- Ashley-Cooper, F. S. (1929). Kent Cricket Matches, 1719–1880. Canterbury: Gibbs & Sons. OCLC 220674085.
- Britcher, Samuel (1790). A Complete List of all the Grand Matches of Cricket that have been Played in the Year 1790. London: W. S. Blake. OCLC 83523010.
- Buckley, G. B. (1935). Fresh Light on 18th Century Cricket. Birmingham: Cotterell & Co. OCLC 23450280.
- Haygarth, Arthur (1996) [1862]. Scores & Biographies, Volume 1 (1744–1826). Kennington: Frederick Lillywhite. ISBN 978-19-00592-23-9.
- Haygarth, Arthur (1997) [1862]. Scores & Biographies, Volume 2 (1827–1840). Kennington: Frederick Lillywhite. ISBN 978-19-00592-23-9.
- Waghorn, H. T. (2005) [1906]. The Dawn of Cricket. London: J. W. McKenzie. ISBN 978-09-47821-17-3.
- Webber, Roy (1951). The Playfair Book of Cricket Records. London: Playfair Books Ltd. OCLC 753176177.
