= 1778 English cricket season =

Cricket season review

The 1778 English cricket season saw the last use of the Artillery Ground for senior matches. Details of eight historically important eleven-a-side matches are known. (Note: Any match listed in the ACS' Important Match Guide (1981) is historically important, and therefore of the highest standard, whether or not a scorecard might exist. The same applies to numerous matches discovered by researchers since 1981. For further information, see First-class cricket.)

== End of the Artillery Ground ==
The Artillery Ground staged its last two matches of any importance in 1878. The venue still exists, and is still used for cricket. On 24 and 25 August, it hosted London v Dartford, historically one of its main fixtures. Pre-match notices billed the event as "Hampshire v England" but that fixture was postponed, and London v Dartford was played instead. The postponement was recorded in the Daily Advertiser on Friday, 21 August. The Morning Chronicle on Tuesday, 25 August reported that London scored over 120 and Dartford 84. Dartford at one point were apparently 0/5. The remainder of the match was to be played out the same day (Tuesday), but no subsequent report was found.

The ground's last big match was England v Chertsey on 15 September. The result is unknown.

== England v Hampshire ==
England and Hampshire met twice, winning one match apiece. The first was 29/30 June on Sevenoaks Vine. England scored 88 and 122; Hampshire replied with 71 and 140/7 to win by 3 wickets. Hampshire had William Bedster as a given man. The top-scorer in the match was Hampshire's Richard Aubrey Veck with 53 not out in the second innings.

The return match was 6/7 July on Itchin Stoke Down. England scored 143 and 130. Hampshire replied with 152 and 76, so England won by 45 runs. Lumpy Stevens took seven wickets (bowled only) in the match for England.

== Chertsey v England ==
The England v Chertsey game on 15 September (see above) was the last-ever "great match" on the Artillery Ground. It was a return to one played 10/11 September on Laleham Burway, which Chertsey won by innings and 24 runs. England scored 65 and 89; Chertsey scored 178 (William Yalden 49). Chertsey were well-served by Lamborn, playing as a given man, who took eight all-bowled wickets in the match, including a 5wI six in the second innings.

== Hampshire v Surrey ==
Hampshire played two end-of-season matches against Surrey. The first was played 24/25 September on Broadhalfpenny Down for a stake of £1,100. Surrey scored 115 (William Bedster 63*) & 166 (Joseph Miller 59); Hampshire replied with 135 (Noah Mann 31) & 149/6 (Tom Sueter 49) to win by 4 wickets.

The return was played 6/8 October on Laleham Burway, and Surrey won by 138 runs. It was Thomas Brett's final known match.

== Other events ==
According to John Arlott in his Arlott on Cricket: "...in 1778 Hambledon announced home and out matches – on level terms and with no 'given' players – with Alresford for fifty guineas a match." He gives no further details.

On 30 May, the Hambledon Club played a team called Hambledon Parish. The match was pre-announced in the Hampshire Chronicle on Monday, 18 May as "Hambledon Club v Hambledon Parish with Noah Mann". The venue was Itchin Stoke Down, which is near Alresford, and often called Stoke Down. The result is unknown.

== First mentions ==
=== Venues ===
- Itchin Stoke Down

== Bibliography ==
- ACS (1981). A Guide to Important Cricket Matches Played in the British Isles 1709–1863. Nottingham: ACS. OCLC 85045528.
- Arlott, John (1984). Arlott on Cricket. London: Harper Collins. ISBN 978-00-02180-82-5.
- Buckley, G. B. (1935). Fresh Light on 18th Century Cricket. Birmingham: Cotterell & Co. OCLC 23450280.
- Haygarth, Arthur (1996) [1862]. Scores & Biographies, Volume 1 (1744–1826). Kennington: Frederick Lillywhite. ISBN 978-19-00592-23-9.
