= 1790 English cricket season =

Cricket season review

The 1790 English cricket season was a successful one for Hampshire who won all three of their known matches, two against England, and one against Kent. Samuel Britcher, the MCC scorer, began his annual publication (to 1805) of A Complete List of all the Grand Matches of Cricket that have been Played, a compilation of match scorecards. His 1790 edition features fourteen scorecards, including six from matches played at Lord's Old Ground, the MCC venue. Details of 22 historically important eleven-a-side matches are known. (Note: Any match listed in the ACS' Important Match Guide (1981) is historically important, and therefore of the highest standard, whether or not a scorecard might exist. The same applies to numerous matches discovered by researchers since 1981. For further information, see First-class cricket.)

== Left-handed v Right-handed ==
A match at Lord's Old Ground (Lord's) from 10 to 12 May is the earliest known example of left-handed players in opposition to right-handed. The left-handers won by 39 runs. There were three more such fixtures until 1870. Arthur Haygarth listed some exceptions on the left-handed team as John Crawte batted with his right hand, and only threw with his left; David Harris and Robert Clifford batted left but bowled right. Since Harris and Clifford took nine wickets between them in the match (i.e., bowled only as catches were not credited to the bowler), the left-handed team's victory was due in considerable part to having two right arm bowlers.

== Hampshire v Kent ==
Hampshire played Kent at Lord's from 10 to 12 June. Hampshire won by 8 wickets. Haygarth commented on 18th century nomenclature saying that, in one account, the teams are called the Earl of Darnley's XI and the Earl of Winchilsea's XI. He explains that "in the old scores the true names were often altered" to those of the team captains or patrons, "thereby creating confusion". This was a low-scoring match in which David Harris and Richard Purchase were dominant as Hampshire's main bowlers. Kent scored 52 and 85; Hampshire scored 119 and 19 for 2. The highest score in the match was 33 by the veteran John Small for Hampshire.

== England v Hampshire ==
There were two matches between England and Hampshire. The first was played from 12 to 16 July on the Vine Cricket Ground, Sevenoaks, and Hampshire won by 44 runs. Hampshire had Joey Ring and James Aylward, both of Kent, as given men. Hampshire scored 158 and 153; England 106 and 161. Aylward made the highest score in the match with 55 in the first innings.

The return match was at Lord's on 30 and 31 August. Hampshire won by 10 wickets. Hampshire's team included four MCC players as given men. England had first innings lead after they scored 177 and Hampshire replied with 165 but, with David Harris taking at least six wickets, England were out for 66 in their second innings. Andrew Freemantle (44*) and Jack Small (32*) shared an unbeaten first wicket partnership of 79 to secure victory for Hampshire. Harris bowled four men out in the first innings and so completed ten in the match (i.e., bowled known only).

== MCC in 1790 ==
Marylebone Cricket Club (MCC) played two matches each against Essex and Middlesex. Samuel Britcher is the sole primary source for the first, when MCC hosted Essex at Lord's on 20 and 21 May. His Grand Matches series began, and was first published, in 1790. The noted amateur batsman George Leycester made his first known appearance in this match. He was active until 1808. Essex scored 116 and 96; MCC scored 177 (George Louch 43) and 36 for 2. MCC won by 8 wickets.

The return match against Essex was at Langton Park, in Hornchurch, on 5 and 6 July. MCC won by 67 runs. They scored 209 (Colonel Charles Lennox 69) and 78 (Lennox 27); Essex made 106 (Goldswain 42) and 114 (Goldswain 41).

The matches against Middlesex were played in the same week in August. The first was at Lord's where MCC won by 2 wickets. G. B. Buckley recorded a notice in The World on Thursday, 12 August, which confirmed the cost of admittance as three pence. Middlesex scored 104 and 182; MCC scored 145 and 142/8. MCC fielded nine amateurs but, crucially in terms of performance, they also had the professionals Billy Beldham and Robert Clifford as given men.

The return match began two days later on the New Ground, Uxbridge Moor, where MCC won by 56 runs. MCC again had Beldham and Clifford as given men. They scored 110 and 101 (Beldham 46); Middlesex 89 and 66. William Fennex scored 41 in Middlesex's first innings, and was recorded as a hit wicket dismissal, as was Thomas Lord in the second innings.

== Other events ==
On 3 June, the Duke of Dorset's XI played the Earl of Winchilsea's XI at Lord's. Winchilsea's XI won by 3 wickets. John Hammond is recorded for the first time in this match; he became one of the outstanding players of the next 25 years. Winchilsea's team consisted mostly of known amateurs plus John Boorman.

== Bibliography ==
- ACS (1981). A Guide to Important Cricket Matches Played in the British Isles 1709–1863. Nottingham: ACS. OCLC 85045528.
- Britcher, Samuel (1790). A Complete List of all the Grand Matches of Cricket that have been Played (1790–1805; annual series). London: W. S. Blake. OCLC 83523010.
- Buckley, G. B. (1935). Fresh Light on 18th Century Cricket. Birmingham: Cotterell & Co. OCLC 23450280.
- Haygarth, Arthur (1996) [1862]. Scores & Biographies, Volume 1 (1744–1826). Kennington: Frederick Lillywhite. ISBN 978-19-00592-23-9.
- Warner, Pelham (1946). Lords: 1787–1945. London: Harrap. OCLC 877106024.
