= 1784 English cricket season =

Cricket season review

The 1784 English cricket season was significant for the appearance in important matches of the White Conduit Club, although the surviving references this year are merely around two "great matches" played on White Conduit Fields. Details of thrteen historically important matches are known. (Note: Any match listed in the ACS' Important Match Guide (1981) is historically important, and therefore of the highest standard, whether or not a scorecard might exist. The same applies to numerous matches discovered by researchers since 1981. For further information, see First-class cricket.)

== White Conduit ==
On 22 and 27 May, there were two events on White Conduit Fields which were both labelled 'A Great Cricket Match'. It is almost certain that these matches involved the new White Conduit Club, but few details are known. George Finch, 9th Earl of Winchilsea was noted as 'the best bat' in the first game. In the second game, a few more players were named including the Duke of Dorset, Colonel Charles Lennox, and Sir George Talbot.

== England v Hampshire ==
The England hosted Hampshire at Sevenoaks Vine on 1 and 2 June. England won by 7 wickets. William Bullen took six wickets in Hampshire's first innings, in which they were all out for 70. Haygarth commented that his original source was the Hampshire Chronicle, as the game 'was not inserted in the old book of scores'.

== Single wicket ==
Six of Hambledon played against Six of Kent between 26 and 28 July on Itchin Stoke Down. Kent won by 20 runs.

On 15 October 1784, the Old Field ground staged a two-a-side single wicket match between Two of Berkshire and Two of Kent. Playing for Berkshire were William Bedster and Richard Lawrence. Their opponents were William Brazier and William Bullen. The result of this match is unknown, but it was the return to one at Blackheath on 5 October, which Brazier and Bullen won by two wickets.

== Other events ==
Although not directly connected with cricket, it was in 1784 that the India Act was passed, creating a department of the British government to exercise political, military and financial control over the Indian affairs of the East India Company. During the next half century, British control was extended over most of the sub-continent, and cricket spread throughout the country as a consequence of that.

Berkshire played Buckinghamshire twice, winning the first by an innings and 21 runs. The result of the second is not on record. Chertsey played Coulsdon on Laleham Burway in June. Chertsey won by 313 runs.

In July, there was a match between Hambledon Parish and Petworth, which the latter won by 52 runs. Also in July, Hornchurch hosted Dartford at Langton Park, but the result is unknown; Francis Booker played for Dartford. At the end of July, Farnham played Alton & Odiham on Holt Pound, which is well known for its association with the Beldham and Wells brothers. The elder brothers may have played for Farnham in this match, while David Harris and Thomas Scott played for their opponents. The result is unknown.

== First mentions ==
=== Clubs and teams ===
- Hornchurch
- Petworth
- White Conduit Club

=== Players ===
- J. Cole (Hampshire)
- Davidson (Essex)
- Colonel Charles Lennox (WCC/MCC)
- Jack Small (Hampshire)
- George Talbot (WCC and MCC)
- Harry Walker (Hampshire and Surrey)
- George Finch, 9th Earl of Winchilsea (WCC/MCC)

=== Venues ===
- Holt Pound, Farnham
- Langton Park, Hornchurch

== Bibliography ==
- ACS (1981). A Guide to Important Cricket Matches Played in the British Isles 1709–1863. Nottingham: ACS. OCLC 85045528.
- Buckley, G. B. (1935). Fresh Light on 18th Century Cricket. Birmingham: Cotterell & Co. OCLC 23450280.
- Buckley, G. B. (1937). Fresh Light on pre-Victorian Cricket. Birmingham: Cotterell & Co. OCLC 23469107.
- Haygarth, Arthur (1996) [1862]. Scores & Biographies, Volume 1 (1744–1826). Kennington: Frederick Lillywhite. ISBN 978-19-00592-23-9.
- Waghorn, H. T. (2005) [1906]. The Dawn of Cricket. London: J. W. McKenzie. ISBN 978-09-47821-17-3.
