= Benjamin Remington =

English cricketer

Personal information
- Born: 1753; Boughton Monchelsea, Kent, England
- Died: Unknown
- Relatives: Michael Remington (brother); Thomas Remington (brother)

Career statistics
Competition	First-class
Matches	13
Runs scored	323
Batting average	14.04
100s/50s	0/1
Top score	62
Catches/stumpings	2/–
- Source: Cricinfo, 30 March 2019

Benjamin Remington (christened 12 August 1753 – date of death unknown) was an English first-class cricketer.

Born at Boughton Monchelsea in Kent, where he was baptised in August 1753, Remington was the oldest of three sons of Samuel and Susanna Remington who played cricket. He made his first-class debut for an England XI against Hampshire at Alfresford in June 1779. In August of that year he appeared for Kent against Surrey at Laleham Burway. In 1780, he appeared in two first-class matches for Sir Horatio Mann's personal XI against the Duke of Dorset's XI at Bishopsbourne Paddock. In that same year he appeared twice for England against Hampshire, before making six first-class appearances in 1881, including for East Kent against West Kent. His next first-class appearance came two years later in 1883 for East Kent against West Kent at Sevenoaks Vine. Across thirteen first-class matches, Remington scored 323 runs, with a high score of 62.

His brothers, Michael and Thomas, also played first-class cricket for Kent sides. Their surname has sometimes been spelled "Rimmington".
