= William Bowra =

English cricketer

Personal information
- Born: 1752; Sevenoaks, Kent
- Died: 7 May 1820 (aged 67–68); Sevenoaks, Kent

Domestic team information
- Years: Team
- 1775–1788: Kent
- 1791–1792: Brighton

William Bowra (1752 – 7 May 1820) was an English cricketer who is known to have played between 1775 and 1792.

Bowra, whose name was pronounced "Borra", was christened at Sevenoaks in Kent on 1 May 1752. He was one of a number of cricketers employed by John Frederick Sackville, 3rd Duke of Dorset at his Knole House estate near Sevenoaks, in Bowra's case as a gamekeeper. John Nyren, in his The Cricketers of My Time, recounts that the Duke would sit on the railing round the Sevenoaks Vine ground, often exclaiming "Bravo, my little Bowra".

He is known to have played for a team organised by Dorset as early as 1769, but his name did not begin to be recorded frequently until a 1775 match between Kent and Hampshire at Broadhalfpenny Down, the ground used by the Hambledon Club. In a Hampshire Chronicle report of the game, his name is spelt "Bower". He went on to make more than 50 known appearances, mostly for Kent and England. Bowra also played for West Kent, a combined Hampshire & Kent, and the Duke of Dorset's XI. He played as a given man for both Surrey and Hampshire. After making his final appearance for Kent in 1788, he played in five more matches in 1791 and 1792 for Brighton Cricket Club.

Bowra returned to Knole in 1807, again as gamekeeper, and it is believed he stayed there until his death in 1820.

== Bibliography ==
- Carlaw, Derek (2020). Kent County Cricketers, A to Z: Part One (1806–1914) (PDF). Cardiff: ACS.
- Lewis, Paul (2014). For Kent and Country. Eastbourne: Reveille Press. ISBN 978-19-08336-63-7.
- Haygarth, Arthur (1996) [1862]. Scores & Biographies, Volume 1 (1744–1826). Kennington: Frederick Lillywhite. ISBN 978-19-00592-23-9.
- Haygarth, Arthur (1997) [1862]. Scores & Biographies, Volume 2 (1827–1840). Kennington: Frederick Lillywhite. ISBN 978-19-00592-23-9.
