= East and West Kent cricket teams =

Historical English cricket team

East Kent and West Kent were titles sometimes given to two cricket teams from their respective areas of the English county of Kent which generally played in matches prior to the foundation of the official Kent County Cricket Club in the mid 19th century. West Kent (or West of Kent) teams have been recorded from 1705, but there is no known record of an East Kent (or East of Kent) until 1781. There were seven major matches from 1781 to 1790 in which teams of this type faced each other, although there is doubt about the match titles with sources using different team names.

The first Kent Cricket Club was founded in Canterbury on 6 August 1842, formed out of the Beverley Cricket Club, and played its first match against England three weeks later. In 1859 a second county club was formed at Maidstone to support the Canterbury club, the two often being known as the East Kent and West Kent clubs respectively. The two clubs amalgamated in 1870 to form the modern day Kent County Cricket Club.

Teams called East Kent and West Kent played each other twice in 1856 in minor matches. Those two matches are the last known to involve a team called East Kent. West Kent became the name of a 19th-century club which played minor cricket only and was for a long time based at Chislehurst Cricket Club, with which it ultimately amalgamated in 1980 as the Chislehurst and West Kent Cricket Club.

== Matches ==
The earliest known record of a "West Kent" or "West of Kent" team is in a match against Chatham Cricket Club on 7 August 1705, played at a place called "Maulden" in the primary source. There is no such place although it is generally believed to refer to Town Malling near Maidstone. The result and details of the teams are unknown. The next mention is a match on 22 September 1769, played at Sevenoaks Vine between West Kent and Surrey. The original report merely states that the wickets will be "pitched soon after 10".

The earliest known match involving an "East Kent" team is one played against West Kent at Sevenoaks Vine on 20 and 21 June 1781. The question of nomenclature arises here because, with at least three given men on each team, the match is also called the Duke of Dorset's XI versus Sir Horatio Mann's XI after the two team patrons John Sackville, 3rd Duke of Dorset and Sir Horatio (Horace) Mann. The "East Kent" team, Mann's XI, included John Small, Richard Aubrey Veck and Lamborn of Hambledon and Hampshire. The "West Kent" team, Dorset's XI, featured the Hambledon players Noah Mann and Tom Sueter with the Chertsey and Surrey players William Bedster and Lumpy Stevens. Noted Kent players involved in the match include Joseph Miller, William Bullen, William Bowra, Robert Clifford and Thomas Pattenden. Sevenoaks Vine was Dorset's home ground and there was a return match at Bishopsbourne Paddock at Mann's Bourne Park House near Bishopsbourne from 8 to 11 August. This also featured guest players with Surrey's William Yalden and Hampshire's James Aylward joining Small, Lamborn, Sueter, Bedster, Mann and Stevens. Dorset's West Kent won both matches, the first by 10 wickets and the return by 106 runs.

Part of the confusion around match titles comes from the ways in which Arthur Haygarth records matches. He calls the June match "West Kent with Mann, Sueter & Lumpy versus East Kent with Small, Veck & Lamborn", but then calls the August match "Sir Horace Mann's Side versus the Duke of Dorset's Side". In its "Important Cricket Matches" guide, the Association of Cricket Statisticians and Historians follows Haygarth by using the abbreviated titles "East Kent with 3 gm v West Kent with 3 gm" for the June match and "Duke of Dorset v Sir H. Mann" for the August match ("gm" meaning "given men").

On 25 and 26 June 1783, a match at Sevenoaks Vine involved "West Kent with Harris, Stevens and Bedster versus East Kent". East Kent won this by 2 wickets. A curious condition of the match was that Lumpy Stevens, generally reckoned the outstanding bowler of the time, "was not to bowl, by agreement". This would have severely handicapped his team, which lost the match, as he was not a good batsman and so, as Haygarth says, "not much use as a given man". Stephen Amherst, who was a Maidstone man and the patron of later West Kent, played in this match for the East.

Amherst had become a match organiser by the start of the 1789 season and led his team to a five-wicket victory against that of Mann at Coxheath on 22 and 23 May. A contemporary report in the Maidstone Journal describes the game as "Sir H. Mann with a select eleven of the County against S. Amherst, Esq. and the County at large, for 100 guineas". The ACS calls the match "Sir H. Mann v S. Amherst". However, the next Mann-Amherst match on 29 and 30 June, also at Coxheath, is called "East Kent v West Kent with each team having 4 gm". This follows Haygarth, whose title is "East Kent with Boorman and Four of Hampshire versus West Kent with Four of Surrey". East Kent won by 8 runs and Haygarth confirms Mann and Amherst as respective managers. The guest players in this match were John Boorman, Richard Purchase, John Small, David Harris and Tom Taylor for the East and Billy Beldham, Harry Walker, Tom Walker and John Wells for the West. Apart from a couple of changes in the East Kent lineup, the same teams met again at Coxheath on 4 and 5 August, East Kent winning by 57 runs.

The final match between Amherst's West and Mann's East took place at Bishopsbourne from 7 to 11 September 1790. Haygarth called it "East Kent with Purchase versus West Kent". West Kent won by 130 runs. Sir Horatio Mann became MP for Sandwich in 1790 and reduced his involvement in cricket. The match in September 1790 was the last important East Kent v. West Kent fixture.

== Bibliography ==
- ACS (1981). A Guide to Important Cricket Matches Played in the British Isles 1709 – 1863. Nottingham: ACS.
- Buckley, G. B. (1935). Fresh Light on 18th Century Cricket. Cotterell.
- Haygarth, Arthur (1862). Scores & Biographies, Volume 1 (1744–1826). Lillywhite.
- Waghorn, H. T. (1906). The Dawn of Cricket. Electric Press.
