= 1779 in sports =

1779 in sports describes the year's events in world sport.

== Boxing ==
Events

- 25 September — Duggan Fearns defeated Harry Sellers at Slough by a first-round knockout after 1 minute and 30 seconds to claim the Championship of England title. This is the only fight in which Fearns is known to have been involved and little is known of him except that he was born c.1754 in Ireland. He never defended his title which was eventually reclaimed by Sellers. The next known title fight was not until 1785 when Sellers met William Harvey.

== Cricket ==
Events

- Hampshire defeated the England XI four times.

England

- Most runs – Richard Aubrey Veck 280
- Most wickets – Lamborn 18

== Horse racing ==
Events

- Inaugural running of The Oaks, sometimes called the Epsom Oaks for differentiation purposes, on Epsom Downs. The second-oldest of the five British Classic Races, the race is named after Oaks Park, an estate located to the east of Epsom which was leased to the 12th Earl of Derby in the 18th century.

England

- The Oaks – Bridget
- St Leger Stakes – Tommy
