= Michael Remington =

English cricketer

Personal information
- Born: 16 December 1757; Boughton Monchelsea, Kent, England
- Died: January 1826 (aged 69); Rochester, Kent, England
- Relatives: Benjamin Remington (brother); Thomas Remington (brother)

Domestic team information
- Years: Team
- 1781: Kent

Career statistics
Competition	First-class
Matches	7
Runs scored	133
Batting average	11.08
100s/50s	0/0
Top score	28
Balls bowled	?
Wickets	1
Bowling average	?
5 wickets in innings	0
10 wickets in match	0
Best bowling	1/?
Catches/stumpings	1/–
- Source: Cricinfo, 19 February 2019

Michael Remington (16 December 1757 – January 1826) was an English first-class cricketer.

Born at Boughton Monchelsea, where he was baptised in December 1757, Remington was one of three sons of Samuel and Susanna Remington who played cricket. He made his debut in first-class cricket for Kent against Hampshire at Alresford in 1781, with Remington also playing in a first-class match for East Kent against West Kent in the same season. His next appearance in first-class cricket came in 1787, when he played for Hornchurch against a combined White Conduit Club & Moulsey Hurst team at Hornchurch. Two weeks after this match he appeared for Essex against Middlesex at Lord's Old Ground, with Remington following this up with two further first-class appearances in 1787; one for the White Conduit Club against Middlesex, and a second for Hornchurch against White Conduit Club and Moulsey Hurst. He made a final first-class appearance in 1791 for Hornchurch against the Marylebone Cricket Club. Playing a total of seven first-class matches, Remington scored 133 runs with a high score of 28, while with the ball he took a single wicket.

He died at Rochester in January 1826. His brothers, Benjamin and Thomas, both played first-class cricket. Their surname has sometimes been spelled "Rimmington".
