= 1777 in sports =

1777 in sports describes the year's events in world sport.

== Boxing ==
Events

- 4 June — Harry Sellers retained his English championship against Joe Hood in a 1 hour fight at Ascot Heath.
- 2 July — Harry Sellers retained his English championship against Joe Hood in a 30 minute fight at Ipswich.

== Cricket ==
Events

- James Aylward scored 167 for Hampshire against an England XI at Sevenoaks Vine to create a new record for the highest individual innings in first-class cricket. The record stood until 1806.

England

- Most runs – James Aylward 390
- Most wickets – Thomas Brett 29

== Horse racing ==
England

- St Leger Stakes – Bourbon
