= 1783 in sports =

1783 in sports describes the year's events in world sport.

== Boxing ==
Events

- June — Tom Johnson defeated Jack Jurvis at Walworth in a 15 minute fight. It's not known if this was for the championship or not.

== Cricket ==
Events

- A report in the Whitehall Evening Post stated that "the 3rd Duke of Dorset’s cricketing establishment, exclusive of any betting or consequential entertainment, is said to exceed £1,000 a year".

England

- Most runs – John Small 157
- Most wickets – William Bullen 18

== Horse racing ==
England

- The Derby – Saltram
- The Oaks – Maid of the Oaks
- St Leger Stakes – Phoenomenon
