= John Crawte =

English cricketer (1763–1836)

Personal information
- Born: 1763; Frensham, Surrey
- Died: 7 October 1836 (aged 72–73); Boxley, Kent
- Batting: Left-handed
- Role: Batsman

Domestic team information
- Years: Team
- 1788–1803: England
- 1788–1798: Surrey
- 1789–1792: Kent

John Crawte (1763 – 7 October 1836) was an English cricketer who played as a left-handed batter during the period between 1788 and 1807.

== Early life ==
Crawte was born in Surrey and christened at Frensham in December 1763. He is known to have lived in the Alresford area of Hampshire, and played for Alresford Cricket Club before he was persuaded to move to Kent by Stephen Amherst, a major patron of Kent matches, towards the end of the 18th century.

== Cricket career ==
Crawte was said to be a fine batsman who played David Harris, the best bowler of the era, better than anyone else. He played in more than 70 matches between 1788 and 1807, mostly for England (i.e., the "rest" of England), Surrey, and Kent. He also played for combined teams, and for those organised by Kent patrons like Richard Leigh and the Earl of Winchilsea. Crawte continued to play club cricket into the 1800s, mostly for Rochester Cricket Club.

== Death ==
Crawte died, aged 72 or 73, in October 1836 at Boxley in Kent.

== Bibliography ==
- Haygarth, Arthur (1996) [1862]. Scores & Biographies, Volume 1 (1744–1826). Kennington: Frederick Lillywhite. ISBN 978-19-00592-23-9.
- Haygarth, Arthur (1997) [1862]. Scores & Biographies, Volume 2 (1827–1840). Kennington: Frederick Lillywhite. ISBN 978-19-00592-23-9.
- Pycroft, James (1952) [1907]. "The Hambledon Club and the Old Players". In Lucas, E. V. (ed.). The Hambledon Men. London: Sportsman's Book Club. OCLC 500497384 – via Wikisource.
