= Odiham Down =

Cricket ground near Odiham, Hampshire

Odiham Down cricket ground
- Interactive map of Odiham Down cricket ground
- Location: near Odiham, Hampshire
- Coordinates: 51.2495°N 0.9352°W
- Home club: Odiham Cricket Club
- County club: Hampshire
- Establishment: by 1779
- Last used: 1788

Odiham Down is a rural location outside the village of Odiham in Hampshire, and a short distance from Basingstoke. Between 1779 and 1788, it was a cricket venue for several historically important matches, (Note: Any match listed in the ACS' Important Match Guide (1981) is historically important, and therefore of the highest standard, whether or not a scorecard might exist. The same applies to numerous matches discovered by researchers since 1981. For further information, see First-class cricket.) and as the home of the Odiham Cricket Club.

== History ==
It was the venue for Hampshire v Surrey on Monday, 14 July 1788. This match was briefly pre-announced a week earlier, but the result is unknown. The stake was 100 guineas.

Other matches on the Down involved Alresford, Berkshire, Hambledon, Hampshire, Maidenhead, and the combined Alresford & Odiham and Alton & Odiham teams. One such match was Alton & Odiham v Farnham in August 1782. Two players called Beldum (sic) played for Farnham. One was George Beldham, and it seems certain that the other (surname only) was Billy Beldham, who was then sixteen years old. Farnham, with the Beldham brothers, played at Odiham Down again in August 1784.

== Bibliography ==
- ACS (1981). A Guide to Important Cricket Matches Played in the British Isles 1709–1863. Nottingham: ACS. OCLC 85045528.
- Buckley, G. B. (1935). Fresh Light on 18th Century Cricket. Birmingham: Cotterell & Co. OCLC 23450280.
- Waghorn, H. T. (2005) [1906]. The Dawn of Cricket. London: J. W. McKenzie. ISBN 978-09-47821-17-3.
