= Chatham Cricket Club =

Historical English cricket team

Team information
- Established: 1705; 321 years ago
- Home venue: Chatham Lines, Chatham

History
- Notable players: George Louch

Chatham Cricket Club was founded by 1705 in Chatham, Kent, England. The first reference to its team is a match against West of Kent in August 1705. There is a specific reference to a "Chatham Club" in a description of a single wicket match in 1754.

Chatham lost by 20 runs to Meopham in June 1772 at George Louch's "cricketing field" in Chatham, and in September 1772 the club played two matches against Dartford, the second one on Louch's field. Chatham won the first at Dartford by 19 runs and then Dartford won at Chatham, also by 19 runs. There are records of three matches against Bourne in 1773. The first at Bishopsbourne Paddock on Friday, 30 July 1773, was abandoned because of bad weather, Bourne won the second at Chatham on 30 and 31 August by 7 wickets and the third at Bourne on 6 and 7 September by 1 wicket.

Louch's field was the club's venue in the early 1770s and there are references in 1785 and 1787 to Chatham Lines as a venue. In August 1787, a local match was played at "The Star" on Chatham Hill and this venue is mentioned several times in reports to 1791, especially for single wicket contests.

There are few mentions of a Chatham team after 1773 and the last 18th century reference concerns a minor match against local opposition in June 1800. There were two "odds" matches played by Chatham against the All England Eleven (AEE) in September 1861, and Kent in August 1862. Both matches were played on Chatham Lines, and the local club had 22 players against 11. Chatham also played the touring South Africans in June 1894. This was an eleven-a-side match which the South Africans won by five runs.

The town of Chatham is famous historically for the Royal Dockyard but it is not known if there was any connection between the dockyard and the cricket club. The Chatham Club ultimately folded and there is no real modern equivalent, not even in Kent league cricket. There are some local cricket clubs, such as Lordswood CC and Sherwood CC.

== Bibliography ==
- Maun, Ian (2009). From Commons to Lord's, Volume One: 1700 to 1750. Cambridge: Roger Heavens. ISBN 978-19-00592-52-9.
- Waghorn, H. T. (1899). Cricket Scores, Notes, &c. From 1730–1773. Edinburgh: Blackwood. OCLC 1086375331.
- Waghorn, H. T. (2005) [1906]. The Dawn of Cricket. London: J. W. McKenzie. ISBN 978-09-47821-17-3.
