= Andrew Freemantle =

English cricketer

Personal information
- Full name: Andrew Freemantle
- Born: 22 October 1768; Bishops Sutton, Hampshire, England
- Died: 19 January 1837 (aged 68); Easton, Hampshire, England
- Batting: Left-handed
- Role: Occasional wicket-keeper
- Relatives: George Freemantle (son); John Freemantle (brother)

Domestic team information
- Years: Team
- 1788–1807: Hampshire
- 1790–1793: Kent
- 1799: Surrey

Andrew Freemantle (22 October 1768 at Bishops Sutton, Hampshire – 19 January 1837 at Easton, Hampshire) was an English cricketer who played for Hampshire during the Hambledon Era and afterwards. He was a left-handed batsman, a noted fielder and an occasional wicket-keeper.

Freemantle made his known debut in the 1788 season and had 136 known appearances in major matches to the 1810 season. He played for the Players in the inaugural and second Gentlemen v Players matches in 1806.

His brother John Freemantle was an earlier Hambledon player.

== Sources ==
- Buckley, G B (1935). Fresh Light on 18th Century Cricket. Cotterell.
- Haygarth, Arthur (1862). Scores & Biographies, Volume 1 (1744-1826). Lillywhite.
- Waghorn, H T (1906). The Dawn of Cricket. Electric Press.
