= George Freemantle =

English cricketer

George Freemantle (14 March 1806 in Easton, Hampshire – ?) was an English cricketer who was associated with Hampshire and made his debut in 1829. His father was Andrew Freemantle of the Hambledon Club.

== Bibliography ==
- Haygarth, Arthur (1862). Scores & Biographies, Volume 2 (1827–1840). Lillywhite.
