= The Woolpack cricket ground =

Cricket ground in Islington, England

The Woolpack cricket ground was an 18th-century cricket venue in Islington, used for matches in 1729 and 1732.

The ground's location has been described as behind the Woolpack Inn.

Two known matches were played at the Woolpack. In August 1729, Gentlemen of Middlesex v Gentlemen of London was due to take place at the Woolpack Back Gate near Sadler's Wells". In August 1732, London v Middlesex was advertised to be played in "the field behind the Woolpack at Islington".
