= John Freemantle =

English cricketer

John Freemantle (1758, probably at Bishop Sutton, Hampshire – 3 August 1831 at Alresford, Hampshire) was an English cricketer who played for the legendary Hambledon Club.

John Freemantle was the elder brother of the more famous Andrew Freemantle. He had only a short career from the 1780 season until 1782, playing seven times for Hampshire.

Freemantle was primarily a bowler and in Scores & Biographies, it is said that he was "tolerably fast". He was a useful batsman but it is said that when fielding he "never flinched from the ball".
