= Stephen Amherst =

English cricketer (1750–1814)

Personal information
- Born: 1750
- Died: 6 May 1814 (aged 63–64); West Farleigh, Kent

Domestic team information
- Years: Team
- 1786–1795: Kent

Stephen Amherst or Amhurst (1750 – 6 May 1814), was an English cricketer and organiser of cricket matches.

Amherst was born in 1750. He is most associated with organising matches involving Kent towards the end of the 18th century. Amherst employed cricketers such as Thomas Boxall, a noted bowler who is believed to have been the first player to bowl legbreaks, and John Crawte, who he persuaded to move from the Hambledon Club in Hampshire. Both men played for Kent whilst employed by Amherst who built an indoor training centre in a converted barn for Boxall to use.

As well as organising matches, Amherst played in 31 matches between 1783 and 1795. He played most frequently for Kent, also for West Kent, East Kent, and the Gentlemen of Kent. He is known to have played in minor matches until at least 1800, including many for Rochester Cricket Club.

Amherst died at West Farleigh near Maidstone in Kent in 1814. Arthur Haygarth quoted from a tablet in the parish church at West Farleigh to confirm his view that the spelling of Amherst's name was correct, rather than Amhurst which is used in a number of other sources. A Stephen Amhurst is recorded as the owner of Court Lodge in the village in 1798, a house his family had lived in since the 17th century, and it is possible that both spellings of the name were used by the same family.
