= List of historically important English cricket teams =

The purpose of this list is to identify historically significant English cricket clubs and teams which played in matches that had either important or first-class status. It concentrates on those which are now defunct or, if extant, not currently significant. Therefore, the list excludes County Championship clubs, Marylebone Cricket Club (MCC), touring teams, and the main university clubs. Clubs in the Minor Counties Cricket Championship, or in one of the ECB Premier Leagues, are excluded unless they formerly played in important or first-class matches.

Some clubs which originally folded were subsequently refounded as modern league clubs. Many of the teams are combinations of recognised clubs or counties–for example, the combined Hampshire, Surrey & Sussex team in 1729. For the most part, ad hoc XIs (elevens) formed by individual patrons or organisers for one or a few matches are not included here; exceptions are the likes of C. I. Thornton's XI, H. D. G. Leveson Gower's XI, and T. N. Pearce's XI which became well-established over several seasons. The ad hoc XIs are listed at List of occasional English cricket XIs.

The total column gives the number of matches that the team is known (i.e., given that many early records have been lost) to have played in. In the source column, if only one citation is given, it relates to the earliest known mention of the team in the surviving records. The list is not necessarily exhaustive.

While the scope of the article is strictly historical, and in no way statistical, it has been necessary in a few cases such as Rutland and the MCC touring teams to temporarily cite CricketArchive, pending discovery of more credible offline sources.

- Note. Where a team name is preceded by a † symbol, there is or will be a redirect to this list.

== A ==
known dates	team name	home or used venue	total	source
1786	† A to C	Moulsey Hurst	1
notes	"A to C" was in fact a Kent Eleven and it was a curiosity that they selected only players whose names began with A, B, or C. Their D to Z opponents, who were in fact a Hampshire team with given men, selected only players whose names did not begin A, B, or C. Haygarth in S&B calls it "Hambledon Club with Lumpy versus Kent". The venue, in Surrey, was neutral. Haygarth says he saw the alphabetical title in other sources.
1831–1833	† A to K	Lord's	2
notes	The two "A to K" versus "L to Z" matches in 1831 and 1833 were among the few genuine alphabetical matches. They were both played at Lord's by teams of MCC members supplemented by a few leading professionals including Jem Broadbridge, William Lillywhite, Fuller Pilch, and Ned Wenman. The 1833 match was 12-a-side.
1787–1789	† A to M	Lord's Old Ground and Bishopsbourne Paddock	5
notes	According to CricketArchive (CA), teams called "A to M" and "N to Z" played each other five times in three seasons from 1787. The main secondary source for the five matches is Scores & Biographies (S&B) which calls the two teams "Earl of Winchilsea's Side" and "Sir Horace Mann's Side". There is nothing in S&B to suggest that the teams were organised alphabetically. Furthermore, the so-called "A to M" teams included Tom Taylor, and the "N to Z" included James Aylward and William Fennex. CA claims that these were given men, and also that the two patrons evidently alternated between the teams, which would put Winchilsea into "A to M" and Mann into "N to Z". The S&B version is supported by the ACS.
1733	† Acton & Ealing	Ealing Common	1
notes
1743–1752	Addington
notes
1744–1746	† Addington & Bromley
notes
1747	† Addington & Croydon
notes
1745–1746	† Addington & Lingfield
notes
1846–1881	All England Eleven (AEE)
notes
1775	Alphabetical Match teams	Artillery Ground and Moulsey Hurst	2
notes	This refers to two matches organised by the Duke of Dorset and the Earl of Tankerville in May 1775, the first one played at the Artillery Ground and the return at Moulsey Hurst two days later. Details of the teams are unknown and so it cannot be said which letters of the alphabet applied to each team. All that is known is that the patrons made two "Grand Alphabetical Matches".
1776–1785	Alresford	Itchin Stoke Down
notes
1782	† Alresford & Odiham
notes
1780–1784	† Alton & Odiham
notes
1919	Army and Navy
notes
1702	Arundel	Bury Hill aka Berry Hill	1
notes	The Arundel club was formally constituted in 1704 but, two years earlier, an Arundel team took part in a match against the 1st Duke of Richmond's XI. The venue for that match is unknown but Arundel's ground at Bury Hill was in use for other important matches through much of the 18th century. The Arundel club remains active at league level in Sussex.

== B ==
known dates	team name	home or used venue	total	source
1805–1832	The Bs
notes
1822	Bakewell
notes
1749–1750	† Bearsted	Bearsted Green	2
notes
1741	† Bedfordshire (18th century)	Woburn Park
notes	First recorded in two matches against a combined Huntingdonshire & Northamptonshire team. The county's first patron and captain was John Russell, 4th Duke of Bedford.
1769–1795	Berkshire (18th century)	Old Field, Bray
notes
1740	† Berkshire, Buckinghamshire & Hertfordshire		2
notes
1743	† Berkshire, Buckinghamshire & Middlesex		1
notes
1779	† Berkshire & Hampshire
notes
1766–1773	Bourne	Bishopsbourne Paddock
notes
1730–1799	Brentford	various	13
notes
1771	Brentford, Hampton & Richmond
notes
1770–1799	† Brentford & Richmond	Richmond Green
notes
1732	† Brentford & Sunbury	unknown	1
notes
1790–1825	Brighton
notes
1752	† Bristol	Durdham Down	1
notes
1912–1939	British Army (or "Army")
notes
1940–1945	† British Empire XI
notes	N.B. This needs its own article.
1975–2006	British Universities
notes
1727	† Alan Brodrick's XI	Peper Harow	2
notes	The earliest known written rules were the Articles of Agreement written by Charles Lennox, 2nd Duke of Richmond and Alan Brodrick, two of cricket's foremost patrons, applicable to the two matches in 1727 which they promoted. The results of the matches are unknown.
1742–1808	Bromley	Bromley Common	20
notes
1743–1749	† Bromley & Chislehurst	Bromley Common	4
notes
1749	† Bromley & London	Artillery Ground	1
notes
1747	† Bromley & Ripley	† Ripley Green	2
notes
1741–1785	† Buckinghamshire (18th century)
notes	Richard Grenville was the county's first patron and captain for a match against Northamptonshire.
1786	† Buckinghamshire & Middlesex
notes	Played against Berkshire at Warfield in September 1786.
1816–1818	E. H. Budd's XI
notes
1821–1825	Bury St Edmunds
notes

== C ==
known dates	team name	home or used venue	total	source
1912–1942	† Sir Julien Cahn's XI
notes
1817–1877	Cambridge Town Club
notes
1826–1833	Cambridge Union Club
notes
1882–1890	Cambridge University Past & Present
notes
1857–1871	Cambridgeshire (19th century)
notes
1864	Cambridgeshire & Yorkshire
notes
1923	Capped (in Capped v Uncapped match at Hastings)
notes
1767–1770	Caterham	Caterham Common
notes
1769	† Caterham & Coulsdon	Smitham Bottom, Coulsdon
notes
c.1610	† Chalkhill	unknown	1
notes	A team with this name took part in the world's earliest known organised match at Chevening, Kent against opponents called Weald and Upland.
1705–1773	Chatham	unknown	2
notes	The first reference to a team from Chatham, Kent, is a match against West of Kent in 1705, one of the earliest known important matches. There is a specific reference to a "Chatham Club" re a single wicket match in 1754. In the last quarter of the 18th century, Chatham was mainly associated with George Louch and is believed to have used a ground owned by him for its home matches, though there are references in 1785 and 1787 to Chatham Lines as a venue. There are some 19th century references but the Chatham club ultimately folded and there is no real modern equivalent, not even in Kent league cricket. The town of Chatham is famous historically for the Royal Dockyard but it is not known if there was any connection between the dockyard and the cricket club.
1731–1789	† Chelsea	Chelsea Common	4
notes	Records have survived of five important matches between 1731 and 1789 which involved the Chelsea club and/or were played on the common. The first, played on the common for the high stake of 50 guineas, was Chelsea v Fulham on Tuesday, 13 July 1731. Fulham won. There was a return at Parsons Green on Tuesday, 10 August 1731, which Fulham won by 3 runs. On Tuesday, 26 June 1733, Fulham again hosted Chelsea at Parsons Green, this time for 30 guineas, but the result of this match is unknown. On Monday, 16 August 1736, there was an inter-county match on the common between Middlesex and Surrey. The stake was 50 guineas and Middlesex won by 9 runs. The last match found in the records was on Thursday, 10 and Friday, 11 September 1789 when Chelsea played Marylebone Cricket Club (MCC) in Marlborough Gardens, Chelsea. This match, which was of dubious status, was probably drawn after a postponement. Chelsea Common virtually disappeared under building work in the 19th century.
1731	† Chelsfield	unknown	1
notes
1736–1784	Chertsey	Laleham Burway
notes
1762	† Chertsey & Dartford
notes
1822–1855	Cheshire (19th century)
notes
1724–1726	† Chingford	unknown	1
notes	In 1724, Edwin Stead's XI v Chingford ended early because the Chingford team refused to play to a finish when Stead's team had the advantage. Lord Chief Justice Pratt presided over the ensuing court case and ordered the teams, as in the London v Rochester match in 1718, to play it out so that all wagers could be fulfilled. The game was completed in 1726 but the final result is not on record. Chingford's involvement is the earliest known reference to Essex cricket but the 1724 venue is uncertain and so not definitely the first match played in the county.
1738–1746	Chislehurst	Chislehurst Common	14
notes
1746	† Chislehurst & London
notes
1927	Civil Service
notes
1920–1946	Combined Services aka Services XI
notes
1771–1784	Coulsdon
notes
1787–1788	Coventry
notes
1646	† Coxheath		1
notes	There was a Coxheath team, as such, in 1646.
1707–1798	Croydon	Duppas Hill	23
notes	A leading club in the 1730s, especially, when it was sometimes representative of Surrey as a county.

== D ==
known dates	team name	home or used venue	total	source
1786	† D to Z aka Rest of the Alphabet	Moulsey Hurst	1
notes	D to Z played against A to C, which was in fact a Kent Eleven and it was a curiosity that they selected only players whose names began with A, B or C while their D to Z opponents, who were in fact a Hampshire team with given men, selected only players whose names did not begin A, B or C. Haygarth in S&B calls it "Hambledon Club with Lumpy versus Kent". The venue, in Surrey, was neutral. Haygarth says he saw the alphabetical title in other sources.
1722–1808	Dartford	Dartford Brent	numerous
notes	The earliest known match involving a team from Dartford took place in 1722, against London. The club's own website says it was formally established in 1727. The club is extant.
1919	Demobilised Officers
notes
1752	† Deptford	† Upper Fountain	5
notes	Played in four matches as Deptford & Greenwich.
1743–1748	† Deptford & Greenwich	† Mr Siddle's Ground, Deptford	4
notes
1746–1750	† Stephen Dingate's XI		9
notes
1769–1790	† Duke of Dorset's XI	Sevenoaks Vine
notes
1753	† Dover
notes
1895–1926	Dublin University
notes
1858–1861	Durham & Yorkshire
notes

== E ==
known dates	team name	home or used venue	total	source
1874–1948	East
notes
1731	East Grinstead		1
notes
1781–1790	East Kent	Bishopsbourne Paddock	7
notes	Although sometimes correctly named "East Kent", some of the teams should more properly be called Sir Horatio Mann's XI. All seven of its matches were against the West Kent equivalent managed by either John Sackville, 3rd Duke of Dorset, or Stephen Amherst.
1822	East Kent & Sussex
notes
1764–1824	† East Sussex
notes
1746–1752	† Edmonton
notes
1731	† Enfield	unknown	1
notes	This is Enfield in Middlesex. Not to be confused with Enfield Cricket Club in the Lancashire League.
1730–1823	Epsom	Epsom Down	9
notes
1732–1794	Essex (18th century)	Langton Park	28
notes	Having previously combined with Hertfordshire (see next entry), Essex are first recorded as a single county in 1737.
1732	† Essex & Hertfordshire	Epping Forest	1
notes
1755–1791	† Eton & Windsor	Eton Brocas	2
notes
1731	† Ewell	unknown	1
notes	Ewell's only known match was against Mitcham on Mitcham Cricket Green. One of their players was "the famous Tim Coleman", who normally played for London.

== F ==
known dates	team name	home or used venue	total	source
1782–1786	† Farnham	Holt Pound
notes
1819	First Letters
notes
1786	Five Parishes
notes
1809	Four Chosen & Seven Others
notes
1800	Four Parishes
notes
1912–1968	Free Foresters
notes
1730–1733	† Fulham	Parsons Green	4
notes

== G ==
known dates	team name	home or used venue	total	source
1725–1737	† Sir William Gage's XI	Bury Hill, Arundel	11
notes	Sir William Gage, 7th Baronet was a noted patron of cricket in Sussex and ran his own team for many years. In a 1729 match against Edwin Stead's XI, Gage's XI is believed to have achieved the earliest known innings victory.
1806–1962	Gentlemen
notes
1751–	Gentlemen of England	various
notes	Effectively an early version of the above.
1771–1889	Gentlemen of Hampshire
notes
1771–1892	Gentlemen of Kent
notes
1855	Gentlemen of Kent & Surrey
notes
1857	Gentlemen of Kent & Sussex
notes
1729	† Gentlemen of London		1
notes	Played a single match against the Gentlemen of Middlesex. Result unknown.
1853–1906	Gentlemen of MCC
notes
1729	† Gentlemen of Middlesex	The "Woolpack", Islington	1
notes	Played a single match against the Gentlemen of London. Result unknown.
1844–1880	Gentlemen of the North
notes
1842–1846	Gentlemen of Nottinghamshire
notes
1844–1920	Gentlemen of the South
notes
1846	Gentlemen of Southwell
notes
1840–1932	Gentlemen of Surrey
notes
1856	Gentlemen of Surrey & Sussex
notes
1771–1910	Gentlemen of Sussex
notes
1925; 1958–1966	† A. E. R. Gilligan's XI	Central Recreation Ground, Hastings	12
notes	An occasional team formed by Arthur Gilligan which played in one match against L. H. Tennyson's XI in 1925 during Gilligan's playing career. Gilligan reformed the team in 1958 for a match against the international tourists (New Zealand in 1958) at Hastings. This became an annual fixture at Hastings until 1966 and Gilligan's team also played against Sussex.
1877	Gloucestershire & Yorkshire
notes
1821–1825	Godalming
notes
1870–1908	† W. G. Grace's XI
notes
1730–1767	Greenwich	Blackheath	9
notes	Played in four matches as Deptford & Greenwich.
1762	Guildford
notes

== H ==
known dates	team name	home or used venue	total	source
1747–1751	Hadlow
notes
1753–1908	Hambledon	Broadhalfpenny Down; Windmill Down
notes	Teams raised by the Hambledon Club are generally termed Hampshire (sometimes Hampshire & Sussex) but there were occasions when a Hambledon team was specifically parish- rather than county-orientated. The club as such was probably founded in the early 1760s, but a number of matches by a Hambledon team were played in the 1750s.
1766–1863	Hampshire (pre-1864)
notes
1788–1794	† Hampshire & Kent
notes
1826	Hampshire & Surrey
notes
1729	† Hampshire, Surrey & Sussex	Lewes (unspecific)	2
notes	The team was alternatively titled Sir William Gage's XI, and it played twice against Edwin Stead's XI (aka Kent). In the first match at Penshurst Park, HS&S achieved what seems to have been the earliest known innings victory.
1772–1786	† Hampshire & Sussex	Broadhalfpenny Down
notes
1726–1770	Hampton	Hampton Court Green and Moulsey Hurst
notes	Piper of Hampton took part in the earliest known single wicket match, on Moulsey Hurst in August 1726.
1751	† Hampton & Kingston	none (played away only)	1
notes
1924–1928	Harlequins
notes
1874–1923	Lord Harris' XI
notes
1885–1930	Lord Hawke's XI
notes
1732–1814	Hertfordshire (pre-1876)
notes
1796	Highgate
notes
1745–1747	† William Hodsoll's XI
notes
1818–1822	Holt (Norfolk)
notes
1899	Home Counties
notes
1800–1808	Homerton
notes
1784–1791	Hornchurch
notes
1738–1743	Horsmonden	Horsmonden (unspecified)	5
notes	Sometimes played under the title of "Horsmonden & Weald".
1741	† Huntingdonshire & Northamptonshire
notes	Formed to play two matches against Bedfordshire, and won both. The patrons were George Montagu-Dunk, 2nd Earl of Halifax (Northants) and John Montagu, 4th Earl of Sandwich (Hunts).
1890	Hurst Park
notes

== I ==
known dates	team name	home or used venue	total	source
1866–1904	I Zingari
notes

== K ==
known dates	team name	home or used venue	total	source
1796	Kennington
notes
1709–1842	Kent (pre-1843)	Several in different parts of the county.	many
notes	Kent v Surrey at Dartford Brent on Wednesday, 29 June 1709, is the earliest known match that definitely involved teams labelled as counties.
1874–1876	Kent & Gloucestershire
notes
1775	Kent & London
notes
1775	Kent, London & Surrey
notes
1771	Kent, Middlesex & Surrey
notes
1864	Kent & Nottinghamshire
notes
1744–1859	† Kent & Surrey
notes
1836–1902	Kent & Sussex
notes
1742	† Kent, Surrey & Sussex		1
notes
1913	Kent & Yorkshire
notes
1720–1767	Kingston	no set venue	11
notes	Some of Kingston's matches were played in combination with other clubs.
1739	† Kingston & Moulsey		2
notes
1743	† Kingston & Richmond		2
notes

== L ==
known dates	team name	home or used venue	total	source
1831–1833	† L to Z	Lord's	2
notes	See A to K entry above.
1745–1748	† Lambeth
notes
1849–1864	Lancashire (pre-1864)
notes
1883–1909	† Lancashire & Yorkshire
notes
1852–1869	Lansdown
notes
1819	Last Letters
notes
1765	† Leeds	Chapeltown Moor	2
notes	Known to have played twice, home and away, against Sheffield.
1781–1825	Leicester
notes
1781–1800	Leicestershire & Rutland
notes
1902–1946	H. D. G. Leveson Gower's XI
notes
1739–1785	Lingfield		7
notes
1821–1824	Liverpool
notes
1882–1894	Liverpool and District
notes
1707–1800	London	Artillery Ground	numerous
notes	There is mention of a London club in 1722 but its foundation date is unknown and the teams which represented London in the early 18th century could have been ad hoc formations. London from the 1730s to the 1750s should be considered the equivalent of a county team as it was different to the Middlesex and Surrey teams it sometimes opposed. It is most famously associated with the Artillery Ground and was especially prominent in the heyday of single wicket cricket in the 1740s. The original London club faded in the 1760s and 1770s when it was superseded by Hambledon as the focal point of the sport; its last known important match was against its old rivals Dartford in 1778. From 1788, there was another London team, possibly unconnected with the original club, which competed against MCC and Middlesex in several matches to 1798. After that, there is a sole reference to a team called London playing a one-off match against Thames Ditton in 1800. Few details have survived of London's players but they included Ellis (accredited the club's "best bowler"); leading batsmen Little and Tall Bennett; and the noted single wicket players Thomas Jure and John Capon.
1940–1945	London Counties
notes
1900–1904	London County
notes
1735–1770	† London & Middlesex
notes
1743	† London, Middlesex & Surrey
notes
1726–1758	† London & Surrey	Kennington Common	7
notes	Teams called London & Surrey were formed occasionally in the 18th century, playing as a combined team, mostly against Kent, which was then deemed to be the strongest county. The combined team played one match versus Addington & Lingfield in 1746.
1744–1749	† Long Robin's XI
notes
1890	Lyric Club
notes

== M ==
known dates	team name	home or used venue	total	source
1775–1781	Maidenhead
notes
1774–1786	† Maidstone
notes	There was a Maidstone team, as such, in 1646. The club was first mentioned 1743 in connection with John Cutbush, but its earliest known match was in 1774.
1816–1864	Manchester
notes
1771–1795	† Sir Horatio Mann's XI
notes
1753	† Marylebone (1753)	None; one away match only.	1
notes	This team had no connection with Marylebone Cricket Club (MCC).
1904–1973	† Marylebone Cricket Club Touring Teams
notes	N.B. This needs its own article. These teams tended to appear in festival matches at the end of an English season before travelling abroad. They usually played against ad hoc XIs or the Rest of England. The team name usually included the nationality of their pending opponents (e.g., Marylebone Cricket Club Australian Touring Team).
1791	MCC & Hertfordshire
notes
1804	MCC & Homerton
notes
1781	† Melton Mowbray
notes
1772–1789	† Meopham
notes
1730–1863	Middlesex (pre-1864)
notes
1733–1912	† Middlesex & Surrey
notes
1754	† Midhurst & Petworth	Bowling Green, Lavington Common, Petworth	1
notes	Last known 18th century opponents of Slindon.
1896–1899	Midland Counties
notes
1898–2019	Minor Counties
notes
1707–1825	Mitcham	Mitcham Cricket Green	13
notes	Mitcham claim to have been founded in 1685, which would make it the oldest cricket club in existence. However, the earliest definite record of the team is dated 26 June 1707. It played in thirteen matches between then and 1825 which may be considered important.
1796–1813	Montpelier
notes
1796	† Montpelier & Kennington
notes
1796–1797	Montpelier Thursday
notes
1802	Montpelier Saturday
notes
1787–1789	Moulsey Hurst
notes
1740	† Moulsey & Richmond		2
notes

== N ==
known dates	team name	home or used venue	total	source
1787–1789	† N to Z	Lord's Old Ground and Bishopsbourne Paddock	5
notes	See the A to M entry above.
1862	New All England Eleven
notes
1862	New England Eleven
notes
1943–1945	† New Zealand Services
notes	Significant service team which played throughout the country during WWII.
1744–1745	† Richard Newland's XI
notes
1956–	Duke of Norfolk's XI	Arundel Castle Cricket Ground
notes
1764–1851	Norfolk (pre-1876)
notes
1836–1961	North
notes
1741	† Northamptonshire (18th century)
notes	First recorded as part of the combined Northamptonshire & Huntingdonshire team in two matches against Bedfordshire and then, shortly afterwards, singly against Buckinghamshire. The first Northants patron and county captain was George Montagu-Dunk, 2nd Earl of Halifax.
1771–1840	Nottingham
notes
1829–1840	Nottinghamshire (pre-1841)
notes
1883	† Nottinghamshire & Lancashire
notes
1803	† Nottinghamshire & Leicestershire	Only known match was at Lord's	1
notes	Nottinghamshire and Leicestershire combined to play Hampshire at Lord's in July 1803. Despite having Beauclerk as a given man, they lost by an innings and 20 runs.
1839	† Nottinghamshire & Sussex
notes
1872–1883	† Nottinghamshire & Yorkshire
notes

== O ==
known dates	team name	home or used venue	total	source
1781	Odiham	Odiham Down
notes
1791–1819	Old Etonians
notes
1881	Old Oxford University
notes
1793	Old Westminster
notes
1817	Old Wykehamists
notes
1878–1883	Orleans Club
notes
1879–1937	Over 30 (Over 30 v Under 30 matches)
notes
1850	Over 36 (Under 36 v Over 36)
notes
1810	Over 38 (Over 38 v Under 38)
notes
1888–1899	Oxford University Past & Present
notes
1839–1992	Oxford and Cambridge Universities cricket team
notes
1779–1781	Oxfordshire (18th century)	Benson Common	2
notes	An Oxfordshire team was recorded in two matches against Berkshire, one at Henley-on-Thames in 1779, the second at Benson, Oxfordshire, in 1781.

== P ==
known dates	team name	home or used venue	total	source
1951–1978	T. N. Pearce's XI
notes
1724	† Penshurst, Tonbridge & Wadhurst	Penshurst Park	1
notes	A combination of three Kent village teams for a match against Dartford. No other instances have been discovered.
1776	† Petersfield and Catherington
notes
1784–1845	Petworth
notes
1806–1962	Players
notes
1826–1892	† Players of Kent
notes
1871–1887	† Players of the North
notes
1842–1845	† Players of Nottinghamshire
notes
1864–1920	† Players of the South
notes
1845–1864	† Players of Surrey
notes
1838–1880	† Players of Sussex
notes
1741	† Portsmouth	unknown	1
notes	Opponents of Slindon in their first important match.
1816–1818	Prince's Plain Club
notes
1730	† Putney	Putney Heath	1
notes	Known to have played (and won) one match, which was against Fulham on Putney Heath.

== R ==
known dates	team name	home or used venue	total	source
1739–	Rest of England (Note: The earliest known use of England as the name of a combined team was in 1739, but some earlier combines might also qualify.)	various	many
notes	Non-international England teams were often referred to simply as "England", or as "All England", but the term typically means "The Rest of England" (sometimes abbreviated to "The Rest") vis-à-vis their opponents, who might be MCC or a county club. There have been specific variations on the "All England" concept, especially the All England Eleven (AEE; 1846–1881), the United All England Eleven (UEE; 1852–1869), the United North of England Eleven (UNEE; 1870–1881), and the United South of England Eleven (USEE; 1865–1880).
1762	† Rest of Surrey
notes
1725–1731	† 2nd Duke of Richmond's XI	Goodwood	12
notes	Charles Lennox, 2nd Duke of Richmond, was a significant cricket patron, especially in his native Sussex. He ran his own team for many years, and was later involved with Slindon.
1720–1805	Richmond	Richmond Green	several
notes
1749	† Richmond & Ripley	none (played away only)	1
notes
1802	Ripley
notes
1775	Risborough
notes
1743–1800	Rochester	Marsh's New Ground	4
notes	Unlikely to be connected with the 1718 Punch Club (below). Known to have played two matches against Dartford in 1743, and two against MCC in 1800.
1718–1719	Rochester Punch Club	unknown	1
notes	The club became embroiled in a famous court case after three of its players attempted to withhold payment of stakes. See: The terms of the wager.
1764	† Romford
notes
1922–1946	Royal Air Force ("RAF")
notes
1942–1945	† Royal Australian Air Force ('RAAF')
notes	Significant service team which played throughout the country during WWII.
1912–1945	Royal Navy ('Navy')
notes
1814–1964	† Rutland	Lime Kilns Ground, Oakham	35
notes	In the 18th century, Rutland was associated with Leicestershire. A county team was first formed in 1814 for a match against Nottingham. Rutland teams played sporadically until 1964, their opponents including the AEE, MCC, Leicestershire, some Minor Counties, and the Pakistan Eaglets.

== S ==
known dates	team name	home or used venue	total	source
1893	† Second Class Counties
notes
1830	† Seven Gentlemen with Four Players
notes
1731–1803	† Sevenoaks	Vine Cricket Ground, Sevenoaks	8
notes
1879–1887	A. Shaw's XI
notes	Formed by Alfred Shaw for three tours of Australia, the team also played some matches in England. The three tours were in 1881/82, 1884/85, and 1886/87.
1757–1862	Sheffield
notes
1826	† Sheffield & Leicester
notes
1881–1896	† Lord Sheffield's XI
notes
1830	† Six Gentlemen with Five Players
notes
1740–1747	Slindon
notes
1836–1961	South
notes
1912	South Wales
notes
1864–1868	Southgate
notes
1810–1814	† St John's Wood
notes
1724–1729	† Edwin Stead's XI	Dartford Brent	7
notes	Edwin Stead was a patron of Kent cricket in the 1720s, and ran his own team as well as leading Kent.
1895–1898	A. E. Stoddart's XI
notes
1800–1811	† Storrington
notes
1736	† Streatham	White Lion Fields	1
notes
1783	† Strood
notes
1764–1847	Suffolk (pre-1864)
notes
1724–1732	Sunbury	Sunbury Common
notes	First mentioned in connection with William Goodwin. Their earliest known match was in 1730 against Epsom on Epsom Down.
1709–1845	Surrey (pre-1846)	Kennington Common, Moulsey Hurst, and others.	many
notes	Kent v Surrey at Dartford Brent on Wednesday, 29 June 1709, is the earliest known match that definitely involved teams labelled as counties.
1846–1873	Surrey Club
notes
1744–1900	† Surrey & Sussex
notes
1729–1838	Sussex (pre-1839)	Several in different parts of the county.	numerous
notes	It is possible that the Gage/Richmond XIs, which played against Stead's XI in 1728, were also representative of Sussex as a county.

== T ==
known dates	team name	home or used venue	total	source
1800	Thames Ditton
notes
1882–1929	C. I. Thornton's XI
notes
1795–1802	The Thursday Club
notes
1751–1786	Thursley	Thursley	3
notes	In the 1750s, Thursley was mostly known for Stephen Harding, and for its inclusion in two combined teams.
1723	† Tonbridge	unknown	1
notes	Tonbridge alone played Dartford in 1723, but combined with Penshurst and Wadhurst to play them in 1724.
1790	Tunbridge Wells
notes

== U ==
known dates	team name	home or used venue	total	source
1923	Uncapped (Capped v Uncapped match at Hastings)
notes
1879–1937	Under 30 (Over 30 v Under 30 matches)
notes
1850	Under 36 (Under 36 v Over 36)
notes
1810	Under 38 (Over 38 v Under 38)
notes
1852–1869	United All England Eleven
notes
1870–1881	United North of England Eleven
notes
1865–1880	United South of England Eleven
notes
1789	Uxbridge
notes

== W ==
known dates	team name	home or used venue	total	source
1800	† Ws & Hs with Lawrell
notes
1790	Wadhurst and Lamberhurst
notes
1755–1799	† Waltham	Waltham Abbey Marsh	5
notes
1801	Waltham Abbey	Waltham Abbey Marsh	1
notes
1799	Waltham & Hertfordshire
notes
1786	† Warfield	Warfield (unspecified)
notes	Parish team similar to the likes of Farnham, Guildford, and Godalming.
c.1610	† Weald and Upland	unknown	1
notes	A team with this name took part in the world's earliest known organised match at Chevening, Kent against opponents called Chalkhill.
1820–1924	The Wednesday Cricket Club
notes
1896	Wembley Park
notes
1844–1948	West
notes
1940–1945	† West Indies XI
notes	Significant service team which played throughout the country during WWII.
1705–1790	West Kent aka West of Kent	Sevenoaks Vine	9
notes	Although sometimes correctly named "West Kent", some of the teams should more properly be called the Duke of Dorset's XI or S. Amherst's XI. Apart from early games against Chatham and Surrey, seven of the matches were between 1780 and 1790 against Sir Horatio Mann's XI, which was the East Kent equivalent.
1822	West Kent and Surrey
notes
1787	West Sussex
notes
1735–1752	Westminster	Tothill Fields
notes
1784–1788	White Conduit Club
notes
1787	† White Conduit Club & Moulsey Hurst	away match only	1
notes
1787–1797	† Earl of Winchilsea's XI
notes	N.B. This needs its own article.
1785	Windsor
notes
1788	Windsor Forest
notes
1757	Wirksworth	Brampton Moor, near Chesterfield	1
notes	This team's match against Sheffield is the earliest reference to cricket in Derbyshire.
1743–1744	Woburn	Woburn Park	6
notes
1754–1806	Woolwich	Barrack Field
notes
1769	† Wrotham
notes

== Y ==
known dates	team name	home or used venue	total	source
1833–1862	Yorkshire (pre-1863)	Hyde Park and Bramall Lane	many
notes	Yorkshire was first used as a team name when Sheffield Cricket Club organised a match against Norfolk at Hyde Park from 2 to 5 September 1833. Most of Sheffield's matches were against other town clubs, notably Manchester and Nottingham, but they called themselves Yorkshire when facing county opposition. The first "Roses Match" against Lancashire took place on 23–25 July 1849, Yorkshire winning by 5 wickets. Yorkshire County Cricket Club was formed on 8 January 1863 at a meeting of the Match Fund Committee which had been established two years earlier by the Sheffield club for the promotion of inter-county matches.
1828	† Yorkshire, Nottinghamshire & Leicestershire	Darnall New Ground	1
notes	An ad hoc team which was formed to play one match only against England at Darnall on 8 to 10 September 1828, England winning by 242 runs. The match arose from a challenge made by William Woolhouse on behalf of the northern counties to the rest of England. It backfired as the combined team, which featured Tom Marsden, could manage only 92 runs in the entire match against the roundarm bowling of Jem Broadbridge and William Lillywhite, while Fuller Pilch scored 49 and 56 for a personal match total of 105.

== See also ==
- Earliest references to cricket in English and Welsh counties
- First known use of English cricket venues (1610–1825)
- List of occasional English cricket XIs

== Bibliography ==
- ACS (1981). A Guide to Important Cricket Matches Played in the British Isles 1709–1863. Nottingham: ACS. OCLC 85045528.
- ACS (1982). A Guide to First-class Cricket Matches Played in the British Isles. Nottingham: ACS. OCLC 10586869.
- Arlott, John (1984). Arlott on Cricket. London: Harper Collins. ISBN 978-00-02180-82-5.
- Ashley-Cooper, F. S. (1929). Kent Cricket Matches, 1719–1880. Canterbury: Gibbs & Sons. OCLC 220674085.
- Bowen, Rowland (1970). Cricket: A History of its Growth and Development. London: Eyre & Spottiswoode. ISBN 978-04-13278-60-9.
- Buckley, G. B. (1935). Fresh Light on 18th Century Cricket. Birmingham: Cotterell & Co. OCLC 23450280.
- Buckley, G. B. (1937). Fresh Light on pre-Victorian Cricket. Birmingham: Cotterell & Co. OCLC 23469107.
- Haygarth, Arthur (1996) [1862]. Scores & Biographies, Volume 1 (1744–1826). Kennington: Frederick Lillywhite. ISBN 978-19-00592-23-9.
- Haygarth, Arthur (1997) [1862]. Scores & Biographies, Volume 2 (1827–1840). Kennington: Frederick Lillywhite. ISBN 978-19-00592-23-9.
- Hodgson, Derek (1989). The Official History of Yorkshire County Cricket Club. The Crowood Press. ISBN 978-18-52232-74-0.
- Maun, Ian (2009). From Commons to Lord's, Volume One: 1700 to 1750. Cambridge: Roger Heavens. ISBN 978-19-00592-52-9.
- Maun, Ian (2011). From Commons to Lord's, Volume Two: 1751 to 1770. Leicester: Martin Wilson. ISBN 978-09-56906-60-1.
- McCann, Tim (2004). Sussex Cricket in the Eighteenth Century (PDF). Vol. 88. Lewes: West Sussex Record Office. ISBN 978-08-54450-55-8.
- Playfair (1957). Ross, Gordon (ed.). Playfair Cricket Annual. Playfair Books Ltd. OCLC 1021050421.
- Underdown, David (2000). Start of Play. Westminster: Allen Lane. ISBN 978-07-13993-30-1 – via Internet Archive.
- Waghorn, H. T. (1899). Cricket Scores, Notes, &c. From 1730–1773. Edinburgh: Blackwood. OCLC 1086375331.
- Waghorn, H. T. (2005) [1906]. The Dawn of Cricket. London: J. W. McKenzie. ISBN 978-09-47821-17-3.
