= George Louch =

English cricketer (1746–1811)

George Louch (1746–1811) was an English cricketer and match organiser during the late 18th century. He was especially noted for his fielding, and was an early stalwart of Marylebone Cricket Club (MCC).

== Career ==
Louch was a native of Chatham, and was evidently educated at Westminster School. He was playing quite regularly for the Chatham club up to 1773 when, for some unknown reason, his career went into sabbatical, as it were, because he does not reappear in the records until 1783. There is an entry in a 1778 diary re the Chatham club, saying the team lost a game at Meopham because:

Ye club is many of them gone to sea. No wonder they was beat.

Whatever the reason for his absence, Louch’s career went into overdrive on his return, and he deserves to be described as ubiquitous for the sheer volume of his appearances at every venue imaginable from 1787 until his final retirement at the end of the 1797 season. In all, he has 134 recorded appearances in important matches. Only the Earl of Winchilsea (128) and William Bullen (119) were anywhere near his total when he retired.

== Fielding ==
In August 1789, it was reported in the press that Louch had been killed on the field by "a ball from the point of the bat, struck with such force that it lodged in his body". He survived the injury, and was back in action next season. Louch was noted for his fielding in his early days, and it is reasonable to assume he was an outstanding fielder in positions that were not so much "catching" or "silly" as suicidal.

== Death ==
When Louch died, the Kentish Gazette of 7 May 1811 carried this notice:

Died April 29 at Ramsgate after a short illness, George Louch Esq, deeply regretted by all who knew him.

== Bibliography ==
- Ashley-Cooper, F. S. (1929). Kent Cricket Matches, 1719–1880. Canterbury: Gibbs & Sons. OCLC 220674085.
- Buckley, G. B. (1935). Fresh Light on 18th Century Cricket. Birmingham: Cotterell & Co. OCLC 23450280.
- Haygarth, Arthur (1996) [1862]. Scores & Biographies, Volume 1 (1744–1826). Kennington: Frederick Lillywhite. ISBN 978-19-00592-23-9.
- Mote, Ashley (1997). The Glory Days of Cricket. Robson. ISBN 978-18-61051-11-0.
- Nyren, John (1998) [1832]. Mote, Ashley (ed.). The Cricketers of my Time. London: Robson Publishing. ISBN 978-18-61051-68-4.
- Waghorn, H. T. (2005) [1906]. The Dawn of Cricket. London: J. W. McKenzie. ISBN 978-09-47821-17-3.
