= Lamborn (18th century cricketer) =

English cricketer (18th century)

Lamborn (first name and dates unknown) was an English cricketer who played in the second half of the 18th century. He is credited with inventing the off break, and is recognised as one of the greatest innovators in the history of bowling. Lamborn is known to have made at least 22 appearances in historically important matches between 1777 and 1781. (Note: Any match listed in the ACS' Important Match Guide (1981) is historically important, and therefore of the highest standard, whether or not a scorecard might exist. The same applies to numerous matches discovered by researchers since 1981. For further information, see First-class cricket.) He played for several teams, including England, Hampshire, and Surrey.

== Career ==
His earliest-known match was for Surrey in 1777. He played for Chertsey Cricket Club in 1778. He played several games for England, and then for Hampshire from 1780.

In 1781, he was associated with Sir Horatio Mann, and played for both East Kent and Sir Horatio Mann's XI. He is not mentioned in sources after 1781.

Few personal details of Lamborn are known, (Note: It was once supposed by Nyren that Lamborn's name was William Lambert, but that arose from confusion with the much later cricketer William Lambert.) except that his nickname among his fellow players was 'The Little Farmer', which does at least provide some clues concerning his size and occupation.

== Innovation ==
Lamborn seems to have been something of a sensation in his apparently short career for he was a most unorthodox bowler. He was a right arm underarm spin bowler with a low, flighted delivery and what has been described as a "twist from off to leg" (i.e., an off-break). The natural way for an underarm bowler to spin the ball is the leg-break (i.e., from the leg side and towards the off side of a right-handed batsman) but Lamborn seems to have invented the off-break by spinning from the off side and towards the leg side of a right-handed batsman. It is said he was 'no batter', and the scorecards confirm this.

Having been introduced in the 1760s, the pitched delivery was still relatively new during Lamborn's career. Until the 1760s, bowlers had always rolled or skimmed the ball towards the batsman, so spin bowling itself was a new skill. According to John Nyren, Lamborn was 'the first I remember who introduced this deceitful and teasing style of delivering the ball'.

== Anecdote ==
Lamborn is the subject of a famous anecdote in which he informed the Duke of Dorset about one near miss that: 'It was tedious near you, sir!' Lamborn had a strong rural accent and the way he said this apparently amused the Duke for some time to come.

== Bibliography ==
- ACS (1981). A Guide to Important Cricket Matches Played in the British Isles 1709–1863. Nottingham: ACS. OCLC 85045528.
- Altham, H. S.; Swanton, E. W. (1962). A History of Cricket, Volume 1 (to 1914) (5th ed.). London: George Allen & Unwin. OCLC 894274808.
- Birley, Derek (1999). A Social History of English Cricket. London: Aurum Press. ISBN 978-18-54107-10-7 – via Internet Archive.
- Major, John (2007). More Than A Game. London: HarperCollins. ISBN 978-00-07183-64-7 – via Internet Archive.
- Nyren, John (1998) [1832]. Mote, Ashley (ed.). The Cricketers of my Time. London: Robson Publishing. ISBN 978-18-61051-68-4.
- Underdown, David (2000). Start of Play. Westminster: Allen Lane. ISBN 978-07-13993-30-1 – via Internet Archive.
