= Alresford Cricket Club =

Historical English cricket team

Team information
- Established: before 1770
- Last match: c.1795
- Home venue: Itchin Stoke Down

History
- Notable players: Tom Taylor; Richard Aubrey Veck; Andrew Freemantle

Alresford Cricket Club was one of the strongest cricket teams in England during the late 18th century. It represented the adjacent small towns of New Alresford and Old Alresford in Hampshire. According to John Arlott, between about 1770 and 1795 Alresford "stood higher in cricket than any town its size has done in the history of the game".

During this period there were four grounds in Alresford. The main one was Itchin Stoke Down, which as of 1978 was part of Itchen Down Farm. Tichborne Down was also used for important games. Matches were also played on The Nythe and on Fob Down. Old Alresford and New Alresford often played each other, the latter usually winning, but for some fixtures they put out a joint team.

== Connections with Hambledon ==
Its period of greatness roughly coincided with that of the even more eminent Hambledon, not too far distant. Many Alresford players also appeared for Hambledon, including Tom Taylor, Richard Aubrey Veck and the Freemantle brothers, Andrew and John. Some of Hambledon's matches, even including some fixtures with England, were played at Alresford.

In 1778 Hambledon announced home and away fixtures with Alresford for fifty guineas a match, with no "given" men. At this period it was common for the weaker team to bring in players from outside, or from their opponents, to even things up. That this was not thought necessary in this case indicates Alresford's perceived strength.

== Bibliography ==
- Arlott, John (1984). Arlott on Cricket. London: Harper Collins. pp. 70–74. ISBN 978-00-02180-82-5. Arlott's piece on Alresford was originally written for the Winter 1978–79 issue of a magazine entitled Alresford Displayed.
