= Bishopsbourne Paddock =

Historic cricket ground in Kent, England

Coordinates: 51.235°N 1.125°E

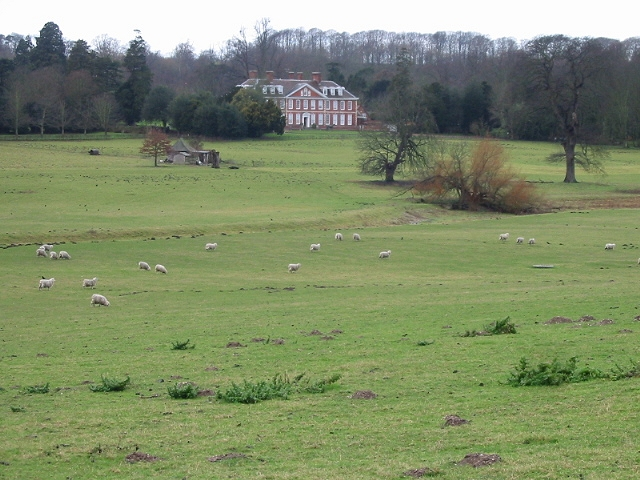
Bourne Park House with the site of the cricket field, including an old pavilion and an iron pitch roller, to the left of the image

Bishopsbourne Paddock was a cricket venue located within the grounds of Bourne Park House, the seat of Sir Horatio Mann, at Bishopsbourne in Kent. It is around 4 miles (6.4 km) south-east of Canterbury.

The Paddock staged several historically important matches from 1766 to 1790. (Note: Any match listed in the ACS' Important Match Guide (1981) is historically important, and therefore of the highest standard, whether or not a scorecard might exist. The same applies to numerous matches discovered by researchers since 1981. For further information, see First-class cricket.)

== Archaeology ==
Archaeological surveys have shown that the site was settled during the Iron Age and Roman periods. In the field which contained the cricket pitch, cropmarks representing a possible Roman building were observed in aerial photos. The survey report says of the cricket venue:

The cricket pitch is an historic feature in its own right: referred to as 'Bishopsbourne Paddock', it was home to first-class (sic) matches of the Bourne Cricket Club, the county team patronised by Sir Horatio Mann in the 18th century, which drew huge crowds and made Bourne Park a significant sporting venue.

The report added that the cricket pitch is no longer in use. The park as a whole is now pasture for sheep grazing, and a recreational area for walkers.

== Early years ==
David Underdown discovered that Sir Horatio Mann used a substantial inheritance to move from Maidstone to Bishopsbourne in 1765, when he was twenty-one years old. He immediately set to work on laying out the Paddock as a cricket ground, and it quickly became the acknowledged centre of East Kent cricket. Mann formed Bourne Cricket Club, and arranged matches against other Kent teams such as Chatham, Dartford, and Dover.

As a cricket venue, the Paddock is first mentioned in a brief report by the Kentish Weekly Post in September 1766. This was found by F. S. Ashley-Cooper during his researches in the 1920s, but those were not published. Instead, as explained by Ian Maun, they were archived by Marylebone Cricket Club at Lord's. Ashley-Cooper's record of the match reads: "Bourne v. Dartford at Bishopsbourne Paddock. No details".

In 1767, the Paddock staged a match between Bourne and Surrey. This was announced by the Kentish Weekly Post on 5 August, calling the venue "Bourn Paddock" and the team "Bourn". That newspaper was inconsistent in its naming of the ground. In 1766, for example, it said a match was played "at Bourn Park", which is the name of the entire estate, not the cricket ground.

Commenting on facilities in 1767, Underdown said:

Bishopsbourne Paddock had more elaborate accommodation than most cricket grounds of the period.

He went on to explain that spectators needing refreshments had to visit nearby Bridge Hill House when the Paddock opened in 1766. However, before the 1767 season began, Mann had installed booths in the ground which sold food and drink.

== Important matches ==
=== 1772 to 1780 ===
Commenting on patronage in cricket, Harry Altham said:

It tended to concentrate the great matches nearer to the milieu of the great patrons, and we find much mention of Sir Horace Mann's ground, Bishopsbourne Paddock, near Canterbury.

Altham added that 20,000 people were there in August 1772 to see "Kent play Hampshire". Arthur Haygarth said the teams were England and Hambledon, though he acknowledged that England was called Kent "in another account". Both teams had given men from other counties, and the home team had at least three; six others were certainly Kent players, but the other two were possibles only as just their surnames were recorded. Hambledon, batting first, scored 123 and 113. England replied with 136 and 101/8 to win by 2 wickets. To accommodate the anticipated huge crowd, Mann had a grandstand built. It is not clear if he charged admission at this time, but tickets for the stand did cost one shilling a few years later, although access to the rest of the ground remained free.

After 1772, and until 1780, the Paddock is known to have hosted at least nine matches. (Information and sources to follow.)

=== 1781 to 1790 ===
During this decade, prior to the final match in September 1790, the Paddock is known to have hosted at least sixteen matches. (Information and sources to follow.)

=== Final match ===
The Paddock continued to stage historically important matches on a frequent basis while Mann was resident at Bourne Park House. He departed in September 1790, and the last known match in the Paddock was played on the 7th of that month between the East and West Kent cricket teams. Mann's team, East Kent, had Richard Purchase of Hampshire as a given man, and was captained by the Earl of Winchilsea. West Kent were led by Stephen Amherst. In Scores and Biographies, the venue and date are given as:

In BISHOPSBOURNE PADDOCK, near Canterbury, Sept. 7, 1790.

West Kent won by 130 runs, largely thanks to William Brazier, who scored 58 in the second innings, and the fast bowling of Thomas Boxall and William Bullen.

This match was the only one played at the Paddock to be included in the works of Samuel Britcher, who was a contemporary writer, and began his series of "Grand Matches" in the 1790 season. Britcher called it Bishopsbourne Paddock, as did Haygarth on numerous occasions covering matches from 1772 to 1790.

== Bibliography ==
- ACS (1981). A Guide to Important Cricket Matches Played in the British Isles 1709–1863. Nottingham: ACS. OCLC 85045528.
- Altham, H. S.; Swanton, E. W. (1962). A History of Cricket, Volume 1 (to 1914) (5th ed.). London: George Allen & Unwin. OCLC 894274808.
- Britcher, Samuel (1790). A Complete List of all the Grand Matches of Cricket that have been Played in the Year 1790. London: W. S. Blake. OCLC 83523010.
- Buckley, G. B. (1935). Fresh Light on 18th Century Cricket. Birmingham: Cotterell & Co. OCLC 23450280.
- Haygarth, Arthur (1996) [1862]. Scores & Biographies, Volume 1 (1744–1826). Kennington: Frederick Lillywhite. ISBN 978-19-00592-23-9.
- Maun, Ian (2011). From Commons to Lord's, Volume Two: 1751 to 1770. Leicester: Martin Wilson. ISBN 978-09-56906-60-1.
- Underdown, David (2000). Start of Play. Westminster: Allen Lane. ISBN 978-07-13993-30-1 – via Internet Archive.
