= Noah Mann =

English cricketer (1756–1789)

Noah Mann (15 November 1756 at Northchapel, Sussex – December 1789 at Northchapel) was an English cricketer who played for the Hambledon Club.

The outstanding Hambledon all-rounder Noah Mann made his debut in 1777. He made 55 known appearances from 1777 to 1789. He was a left-handed batsman and bowler. Said to be a powerful hitter as a batsman, he could also swing the ball and seems to have been a medium fast seamer.

Mann was extremely athletic and Haygarth recounts how he "could cover an immense deal of ground, darting about like lightning". He could also perform extraordinary feats of agility on horseback, being able to pick up handkerchiefs from the ground while going at full speed.

Noah Mann's early death was through a bizarre accident. Haygarth recounts that: "he had been out shooting, and on his return to the Half Moon Inn, at Northchapel, wet and tired, he had a free carouse with his companions; refusing to go to bed, he persisted in sleeping all night in his chair in front of the fire. It was and still is the custom in that part of the country to heap together all the ashes on the hearth, for the purpose of keeping the fire in till the next day. During the night, having fallen asleep, the sparks ignited his clothes (or, as stated in Nyren's book, he fell upon the embers), and he was so severely burnt that he died the next day, not surviving twenty-four hours. His death took place at the early age of 33, in December, 1789". A verdict of accidental death was returned at the inquest.

His son, also called Noah, was engaged by MCC as a bowler for about sixteen years and frequently appeared in MCC matches, mainly at Lord's.

== Bibliography ==
- Fresh Light on 18th Century Cricket by G B Buckley (FL18)
- The Dawn of Cricket by H T Waghorn (WDC)
- Scores & Biographies, Volume 1 by Arthur Haygarth (SBnnn)
- The Glory Days of Cricket by Ashley Mote (GDC)
- John Nyren's "The Cricketers of my Time" by Ashley Mote
