= Windmill Down =

Sports venue in Hambledon, England

Coordinates: 50.9423°N 1.0712°W

Windmill Down cricket ground
- Interactive map of Windmill Down cricket ground
- Location: near Hambledon, Hampshire
- Home club: Hambledon Club
- County club: Hampshire
- Establishment: 1782
- Last used: 1795

Windmill Down is a rural location near the town of Hambledon in Hampshire. From 1782 to 1795, it was the home of the Hambledon Club as a noted cricket venue.

Hambledon used Broadhalfpenny Down from at least 1753 until 1781 when it was abandoned for being "too remote". Broadhalfpenny is about two miles from the village whereas Windmill Down is adjacent, although Broadhalfpenny had a pub immediately opposite (the famous Bat and Ball Inn) but Windmill Down did not.

On Tuesday 18 June 1782, the Hampshire Chronicle reported the first meeting on Windmill Down, referring to the ground as "a field called the New Broad Halfpenny adjoining to the Town of Hambledon". It is probable, but unconfirmed, that the first match was played there a week later. The ground's first definite match was Hampshire v England in August 1782, England winning by 147 runs.

Windmill Down was used regularly as the home venue for Hampshire matches until July 1795 when the last recorded match took place there.
