= Itchin Stoke Down =

Cricket ground near Alresford, Hampshire

Coordinates: 51.091°N 1.162°W

Itchin Stoke Down cricket ground
- Interactive map of Itchin Stoke Down cricket ground
- Location: near Alresford, Hampshire
- Home club: Alresford Cricket Club; Hambledon Club
- County club: Hampshire
- Establishment: by 1778
- Last used: 1806

Itchin Stoke Down is a rural location near the town of Alresford in Hampshire. Between 1778 and 1806, it was a cricket venue for several historically important matches, (Note: Any match listed in the ACS' Important Match Guide (1981) is historically important, and therefore of the highest standard, whether or not a scorecard might exist. The same applies to numerous matches discovered by researchers since 1981. For further information, see First-class cricket.) and as the home of the Alresford Cricket Club.

== Cricket venue ==
In the contemporary records, the venue's name is often shortened to "Stoke Down", which is incorrect, as is a popular notion that it is near Hambledon like the other two famous Hampshire venues of the time: Broadhalfpenny Down and Windmill Down.

Itchin Stoke Down is first referenced as the venue for the Hambledon Club v Hambledon Parish match on Saturday, 30 May 1778. The result is unknown. The game was pre-announced in the Hampshire Chronicle on Monday, 18 May as "Hambledon Club v Hambledon Parish with Noah Mann". This was more in the way of a local match, possibly a practice match by the Hambledon Club, or perhaps even to give the venue a trial.

The first important match known to have taken place on the Down is Hampshire v England on 6 & 7 July 1778. England won by 45 runs, thanks largely to the bowling of Lumpy Stevens.

The Down was used as an occasional venue by Hampshire teams from then until the early years of the 19th century. It was still in use for a Hampshire v England match as late as 1806, which was several years after the demise of the Hambledon Club.

== Bibliography ==
- ACS (1981). A Guide to Important Cricket Matches Played in the British Isles 1709–1863. Nottingham: ACS. OCLC 85045528.
- Buckley, G. B. (1935). Fresh Light on 18th Century Cricket. Birmingham: Cotterell & Co. OCLC 23450280.
- Haygarth, Arthur (1996) [1862]. Scores & Biographies, Volume 1 (1744–1826). Kennington: Frederick Lillywhite. ISBN 978-19-00592-23-9.
