= Lumpy Stevens =

English cricketer (1735 – 1819)

Personal information
- Born: 1735; Send, Surrey, England
- Died: 7 September 1819 (aged 83–84); Walton-on-Thames, Surrey, England
- Nickname: Lumpy
- Batting: Right-handed
- Bowling: Right-arm medium-fast
- Role: Bowler

Domestic team information
- Years: Team
- 1768–1789: Surrey
- Source: CricketArchive, 31 July 2009

Edward "Lumpy" Stevens (1735 – 7 September 1819) was an English professional cricketer who played in the 18th century. He was an outstanding bowler who is generally regarded as the first great bowler in the game's history. He was universally known by his nickname and was always called "Lumpy" in contemporary scorecards and reports.

== Cricket career ==
Stevens was born in 1735 at Send, Surrey.

The beginning of Stevens' career, in 1756, was before scorecards began to be kept on a regular basis. It is not known if Stevens was the first to "give the ball air", but he was certainly around when that particular revolution occurred, probably before 1770. What is known is that Stevens was the bowler who made the most careful study of flight and worked out all the implications of variations in pace, length and direction mentioned above. He became a master of his craft.

Stevens is normally associated with Surrey teams. He continued as a player until he was 54, playing his last match in 1789 for England against Hampshire at Sevenoaks Vine.

It is not known what took place in his career following this game, but John Major suspected that Stevens enlisted in the British Army: on 20 May 1793 a letter signed by 'A Kentish Cricketer' written to Sporting Magazine describes an incident where an Ensign Hamilton, a member of the Sevenoaks Vine Club, had a cannonball deflected away from his head by a Sergeant. The magazine and the Maidstone Journal both linked the story to Stevens.

== Style and technique ==
How he came by his legendary nickname is uncertain but it may have been because he was adept at choosing a pitch to suit his very subtle variations of pace, length and direction. In the 18th century, choice of pitch was granted to one team according to agreement and it was generally the leading bowler on that team who chose the place where the wickets would be pitched. According to the famous verse:

For honest Lumpy did allow
He ne'er would pitch but o'er a brow

== Family and personal life ==
Stevens was a gardener by trade and his bowling prowess earned him a job on the Walton-on-Thames estate of the Earl of Tankerville, a noted patron of the game.

== Legacy ==
It is known that in a single wicket match in May 1775, Stevens beat the Hambledon batsman John Small three times with the ball going through the two stump wicket of the day. Partly as a result, a third stump was agreed.

== Bibliography ==
- Harry Altham, A History of Cricket, Volume 1 (to 1914), George Allen & Unwin, 1926.
- Derek Birley, A Social History of English Cricket, Aurum, 1999.
- Rowland Bowen, Cricket: A History of its Growth and Development, Eyre & Spottiswoode, 1970.
- G. B. Buckley, Fresh Light on 18th Century Cricket, Cotterell, 1935.
- David Frith, The Fast Men, Van Nostrand Rheinhold, 1975.
- Arthur Haygarth, Scores & Biographies, Volume 1 (1744–1826), Lillywhite, 1862.
- Ashley Mote, The Glory Days of Cricket, Robson, 1997.
- John Nyren, The Cricketers of my Time (ed. Ashley Mote), Robson, 1998.
- David Underdown, Start of Play, Allen Lane, 2000.
- H. T. Waghorn, Cricket Scores, Notes, etc. (1730–1773), Blackwood, 1899.
- H. T. Waghorn, The Dawn of Cricket, Electric Press, 1906.
