= James Aylward (cricketer) =

English cricketer (1741–1827)

Personal information
- Full name: James Aylward
- Born: 1741; Warnford, Droxford, Hampshire
- Died: December 1827 (aged 85–86); Marylebone, Middlesex
- Batting: Left-handed
- Role: Batsman

Domestic team information
- Years: Team
- 1773–1779: Hampshire
- 1779–1793: Kent
- Source: ESPN cricinfo, 1 June 2022

James Aylward (1741 – December 1827) was an English cricketer who played for Hampshire, Kent and England in the late 18th century. A left-handed batsman, he is recorded as playing in over one hundred important matches between 1773 and 1797. Aylward made the highest known score of 167 in 1777, and held the record until 1820. He was born at Warnford, near Droxford, Hampshire, and died in Marylebone.

== Career ==
In June 1777, Aylward scored 167 runs for Hampshire against England at Sevenoaks Vine, beating the known record score of 136 by John Small in 1775. Aylward held the record until 1820. John Nyren said the innings was "one of the greatest feats upon record in the annals of cricket".

In 1779, the Kent cricket patron Sir Horatio Mann employed Aylward as a water bailiff at Bourne Park House. He left Hampshire and thereafter played mainly for Kent. He also made numerous appearances for England teams. (Note: Until the second half of the 19th century, teams called England were not representative of the country.)

== Later life and death ==
Aylward lived in London later in life. He died at Edward Street in Marylebone in December 1827, aged 85 or 86. He was buried on 27 December at St John's Wood Churchyard, close to Lord's.
