= Single wicket cricket =

Form of cricket played between two individuals

Single wicket cricket is a form of cricket played between two individuals, who take turns to bat and bowl against each other. The one bowling is assisted by a team of fielders, who remain as fielders at the change of innings. The winner is the one who scores more runs. There was considerable interest in single wicket during the middle part of the 18th century when it enjoyed top-class status.

Almost never seen professionally today, it is most often encountered in local cricket clubs, in which there are a number of knockout rounds leading to a final. The exact rules can vary according to local practice: for example, a player might be deducted runs for an out rather than ending their innings. An innings typically is limited to two or three overs. When single wicket was popular in the 18th century, however, there was no overs limitation, and a player's innings ended only on his dismissal.

The BBC Radio 4 drama The Archers features a regular single wicket competition.

== History ==
Single wicket has known periods of huge success when it was more popular than the eleven-a-side version of cricket. This was especially so among gamblers at the Artillery Ground during the middle years of the 18th century. Star performers at the time included Robert Colchin, Stephen Dingate, Tom Faulkner and Thomas Waymark.

It was in a single-wicket match on 22–23 May 1775 that Surrey bowler Lumpy Stevens beat Hampshire batsman John Small three times with the ball going through the two stump wicket of the day. As a result of Stevens' protests, the patrons agreed that a third stump should be added.

Despite this famous match, single wicket experienced a lull during the Hambledon Era and in the early years of Marylebone Cricket Club (MCC), but its popularity soared again in the first half of the 19th century, when leading players like Alfred Mynn and Nicholas Felix took part in some significant matches. From about 1800 to the 1820s, single wicket matches were popular but riddled with gambling-related match fixing.

With the rise of the All England Eleven and a growing interest in county cricket, single wicket lapsed again and has rarely been seen at the highest level since 1850, despite a brief revival in the 1960s. A single wicket competition called the Courage International Batsman of the Year was held at The Oval over two days in September 1979. The event was won by Clive Lloyd, who beat David Gower in the final.

The 2020 Ultimate Kricket Challenge was a form of single wicket cricket, in which players competed in head-to-head matches. Runs were scored by hitting into zones; and each player was assisted by a wicket-keeper and one other fielder when they were bowling, as well as being allowed a substitute bowler for up to 7 balls in each 15 ball innings. The inaugural tournament was won by Rashid Khan, who defeated Andre Russell in the final.

== Alternative definition ==
In an 1831 issue of New Sporting Magazine, "single wicket" cricket was not a one-on-one competition, but was defined as cricket with fewer than five players per team. In this modified form, runs could only be scored by hitting the ball to an area forward of the wicket, halving the zone in which runs could be scored. Otherwise the rules were similar to ordinary cricket, which the publication referred to as "double wicket".

John Thorn, the Official Baseball Historian for Major League Baseball, speculates that the baseball concept of foul territory may have originated from this variant.
