= Richard Aubrey Veck =

English cricketer

Richard Aubrey Veck (1756 at New Alresford, Hampshire – 13 November 1823 at Bishops Waltham, Hampshire) was an English cricketer who played for the Hambledon Club.

He is one of the first cricketers whose full name is known and in fact it is not absolutely clear if he was addressed as Richard or Aubrey, so the full name is used in the title of this article.

Veck was a very successful batsman but was strangely overlooked by John Nyren in The Cricketers of my Time. Indeed, his omission is one of the main reasons why many historians regard Nyren as unreliable. The statistical record and contemporary reports both show that Veck was one of the outstanding batsmen of his time.

Veck was a regular Hampshire player for nine seasons until 1784, but then left the game at age 28, apparently because he set up a business interest at Bishops Waltham, where he died in 1823.

He made 35 known appearances between 1776 and 1784.
