= Rowland Bowen =

English cricket historian (1916-1978)

Rowland Francis Bowen (27 February 1916 – 4 September 1978) was a British Army officer and a cricket researcher, historian and writer.

Educated at Westminster School, Bowen received an emergency commission in April 1942 into the Indian Army. He spent many years in Egypt, Sudan and India before returning to England in 1951 and joining the Royal Engineers as a captain, working at the War Office and ultimately being promoted to the rank of major. He later worked for the Joint Intelligence Bureau, part of Britain's military intelligence establishment.

He became involved in cricket research and history in 1958 and, in 1963, he founded the magazine The Cricket Quarterly which ran until 1970. He is best known for his book Cricket: A History of its Growth and Development throughout the World (1970) which has been described as "indispensable" but also as "spikily controversial and vigorously wide-ranging". In John Arlott's review of the book for Wisden, he commented that it was "unique in my experience as a major work on cricket written from a wide view, in disapproval of the game's establishment and in expectation of the demise of the first-class game".

An eccentric and difficult man, "Bowen never made an influential friend he couldn’t turn into an avowed adversary". He self-amputated his healthy right leg below the knee, possibly due to a condition known as BID, in September 1968.

In 1974 he married a widow, Anne Valerie Jodelko, who had two visually impaired sons. He died four years later, at Buckfastleigh, Devon, aged 62.
