= William Bullen =

English cricketer (18th century)

Cricket information
- Batting: Right-handed
- Bowling: Right-arm fast (underarm)
- Role: All-rounder

Domestic team information
- Years: Team
- 1773–1800: Kent

William Bullen was a leading English cricketer throughout the last quarter of the 18th century, his known career spanning the years 1773 to 1800. He was an all-rounder who probably batted and bowled right-handed. (Note: Bullen played for the Right-handed XI in the 1790 Left-handed v Right-handed match.) He played mainly for Kent, and also for England.

== Career ==
Bullen was possibly a native of Deptford in Kent, and is known to have played for Dartford Cricket Club as well as teams organised by landowners from the western parts of the county. Arthur Haygarth, writing in the 1860s, described him as a "close set, strong built man", and as a "crack" (i.e., expert) player, who was a "renowned batsman and bowler". Bullen was a fast bowler in the prevailing underarm style, and a hard-hitting batsman who was a "powerful" player. He is reputed to have "frequently bowled the sixth part of a mile (about 300 yards), or the whole length of the Artillery Ground in London".

Bullen is known to have played in nearly every season from 1773 to 1800. His first known appearance was for England against Hampshire on the Artillery Ground in July 1773. He scored one run in both the England innings. At Sevenoaks Vine in July 1774, again playing for England against Hampshire, Bullen took five wickets in Hampshire's first innings, the earliest recorded instance of a bowler taking five wickets in an innings. He played for Kent from 1774, including matches against Maidstone teams in 1777, and his last known appearances were in four "odds" matches (Note: An odds match involves handicapping the stronger of the two teams by giving additional players to the weaker one. There are matches on record in which, for example, a team with eleven players has been opposed by one with 22.) for Kent against England in 1800.

== Bibliography ==
- Birley, Derek (1999). A Social History of English Cricket. London: Aurum Press. ISBN 978-18-54107-10-7 – via Internet Archive.
- Carlaw, Derek (2020). Kent County Cricketers, A to Z: Part One (1806–1914) (PDF). Cardiff: ACS.
- Haygarth, Arthur (1996) [1862]. Scores & Biographies, Volume 1 (1744–1826). Kennington: Frederick Lillywhite. ISBN 978-19-00592-23-9.
- Waghorn, H. T. (2005) [1906]. The Dawn of Cricket. London: J. W. McKenzie. ISBN 978-09-47821-17-3.
