= Vine Cricket Ground =

Cricket ground in Sevenoaks, England

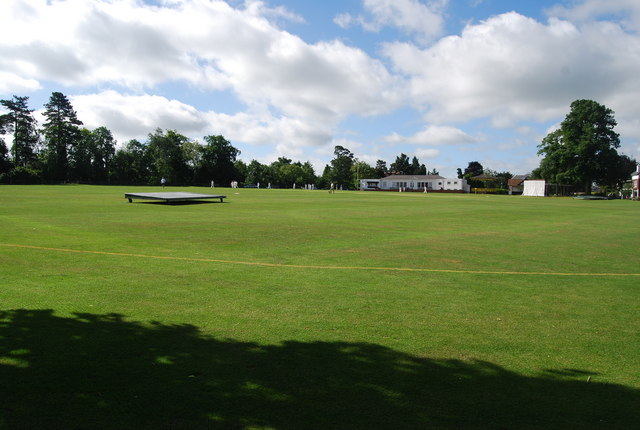
- The Vine cricket ground Sevenoaks
- Interactive map of Vine Cricket Ground

Ground information
- Location: Sevenoaks, Kent
- Coordinates: 51.276°N 0.194°E
- Home club: Sevenoaks Vine Cricket Club
- Establishment: by 1734

Team information
Kent	(1734–1851)
Sevenoaks Vine Cricket Club	(1734–present)
Kent women	(1949–1973)
Kent Second XI	(1952–1958)
- As of 16 December 2017; Source: CricketArchive

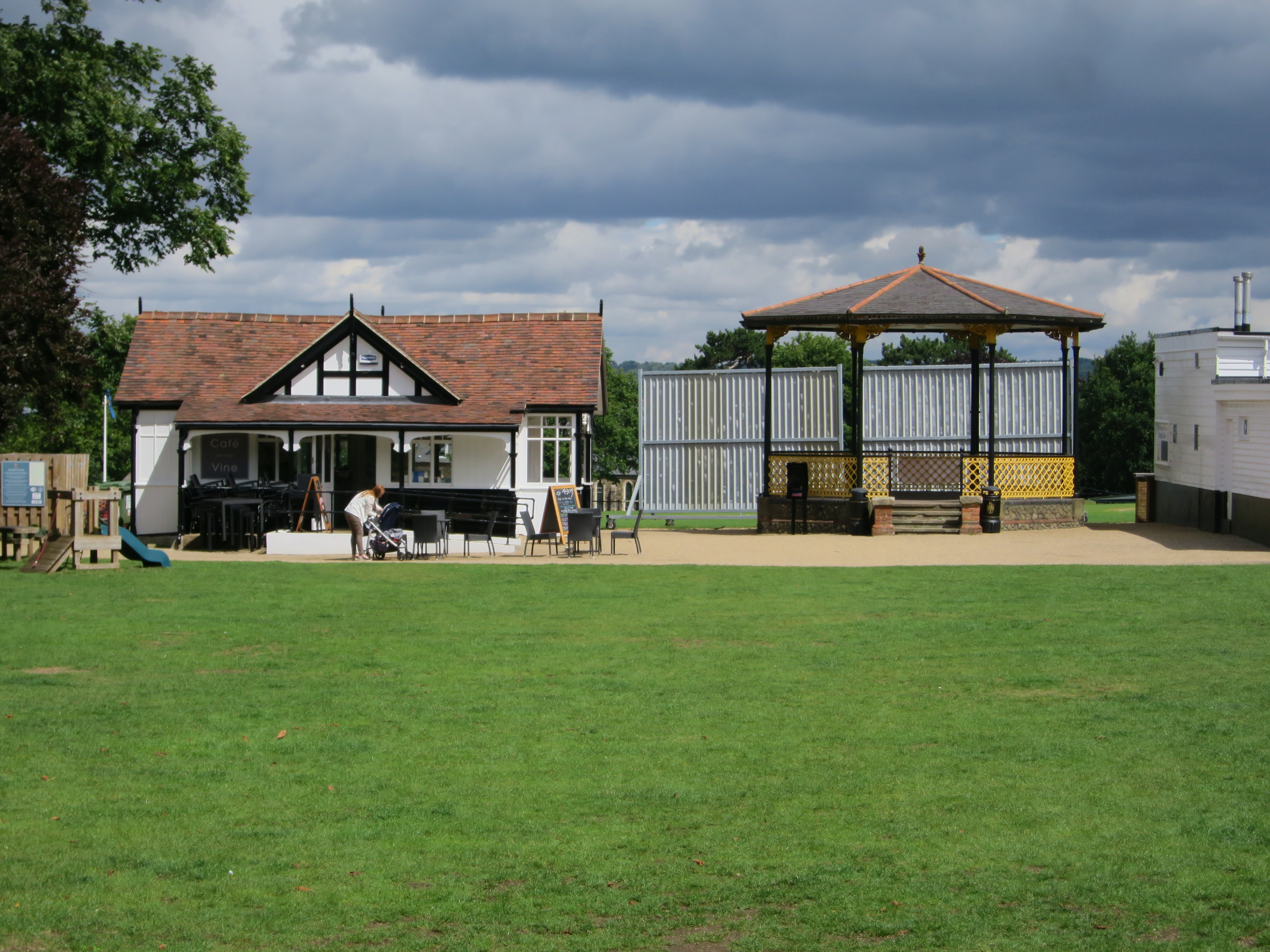
The bandstand next to the pavilion, Sevenoaks Vine

The Vine Cricket Ground, also known as Sevenoaks Vine, is one of the oldest cricket venues in England. Its name comes from a belief that the site was once a vineyard owned by the Archbishop of Canterbury.

The Vine's earliest known use was in September 1734 for an historically important match between Kent and Sussex. The world record for the highest known individual score was twice broken on Sevenoaks Vine—by Joseph Miller in 1774, and by James Aylward in 1777. The Vine staged its last important match in 1829.

In 1773, the ground was given to the town of Sevenoaks by John Frederick Sackville, 3rd Duke of Dorset (1745–1799), the owner of nearby Knole House. The Vine is now owned by Sevenoaks Town Council, and is the home venue of Sevenoaks Vine Cricket Club, who play in the Kent Cricket League. The club must pay a literal peppercorn rent each year.

== The ground ==
In the 14th century, the land on which The Vine is sited may have been a vineyard (hence the name), then owned by the Archbishop of Canterbury. In 1773, it was given to the town of Sevenoaks by John Frederick Sackville, 3rd Duke of Dorset (1745–1799), whose family owns Knole House, where the ground is sited. Sackville required a rent of 1 peppercorn per year for the use of the ground—a literal peppercorn rent.

The weatherboard pavilion, now a Grade II listed building, was built in 1850, and the rent was increased to two peppercorns—one for the ground, and one for the pavilion. A bandstand was built next to the pavilion in 1894, and the ground is overlooked by a number of residential properties, one of which, Vine Cottage, is contemporary with the establishment of the ground. The pavilion was renovated in 1934. The pavilion rent is now a nominal pecuniary one, paid annually to the local council. Sevenoaks Vine Cricket Club use the ground as their home venue, and so they pay the rents. In keeping with tradition, they also pay Lord Sackville one cricket ball on 21 July each year, if requested. The club is, however, responsible for maintenance of the ground, even though it is common land.

In 1902, seven oak trees were planted on the northern edge of the ground to mark the coronation of Edward VII. Six of them were blown down in the Great Storm of 1987. In December 1987, new oaks were planted to replace those lost in the storm.

== Cricket history ==
First recorded as a cricket venue in 1734, Sevenoaks Vine is one of the oldest in the world. The event was an historically important match, organised by Lord John Sackville, between Kent and Sussex on Friday 6 September 1734, a game which Kent won. A fixture was played to mark the bicentenary of the occasion in 1934.

Sevenoaks Vine was a venue for top class cricket matches in the 18th century, and is notable for being the first place in England where cricket was played with three stumps in the wicket, rather than two. Numerous important matches were played on the ground between 1773 and 1829. These included matches between Hampshire and England, and many in which Kent was the home team.

The first recorded century in any form of cricket was scored on the ground in 1769, John Minshull scoring 107 runs for the Duke of Dorset's XI against Wrotham. Minshull, a professional employed as a gardener by the Duke of Dorset, went on to be the first player known to be given out hit wicket, again at The Vine, in 1773.

The world record for the highest known individual score in an important match was twice established at the Vine. First Joseph Miller, playing for Kent against Hampshire in August 1774, made 95 runs out of 240 and enabled Kent to win by an innings and 35 runs. Then, in June 1777, came one of the most significant innings of cricket's early history when James Aylward scored a record 167 for Hampshire against England. In a contemporary report, it is stated that: "Aylward went in at 5 o’clock on Wednesday afternoon, and was not out till after three on Friday". Hampshire won by an innings and 168 runs in one of the first matches to use three stumps in the wicket rather than two. Aylward's score was not surpassed until 1820, when William Ward scored 278 for Marylebone Cricket Club against Norfolk at Lord's.

The last use of the Vine for an important match was in 1829. The Vine was used by Kent County Cricket Club's Second XI for three Minor Counties Championship matches between 1952 and 1958 and by Kent Women between 1949 and 1973. The ground has not been used for matches by Kent County Cricket Club, originally founded in 1842, as it cannot be enclosed given its status as common land.

Today, the ground is the home venue of Sevenoaks Vine Cricket Club who play in the Kent Cricket League.

== Bibliography ==
- Bowen, Rowland (1970). Cricket: A History of its Growth and Development. London: Eyre & Spottiswoode. ISBN 978-04-13278-60-9.
- Haygarth, Arthur (1996) [1862]. Scores & Biographies, Volume 1 (1744–1826). Kennington: Frederick Lillywhite. ISBN 978-19-00592-23-9.
- Maun, Ian (2009). From Commons to Lord's, Volume One: 1700 to 1750. Cambridge: Roger Heavens. ISBN 978-19-00592-52-9.
- Waghorn, H. T. (1899). Cricket Scores, Notes, &c. From 1730–1773. Edinburgh: Blackwood. OCLC 1086375331.
