= Kent county cricket team (pre-1843) =

Historical English cricket team

Until 1842, the Kent county cricket team, always known as Kent, was organised by individual patrons and other groups. It played historically important matches from the early 18th century until the formation of the original Kent County Cricket Club in August 1842. (Note: Any match listed in the ACS' Important Match Guide (1981) is historically important, and therefore of the highest standard, whether or not a scorecard might exist. The same applies to numerous matches discovered by researchers since 1981. For further information, see First-class cricket.)

The county's links to cricket go back to time immemorial, as Kent and Sussex are generally accepted as the birthplace of the sport. It is widely believed that cricket was first played by children living on the Weald in Saxon or Norman times. The earliest known organised match was held in Kent in around 1611, and the county was always at the forefront of cricket's development, through the growth of village cricket in the 17th century to representative matches in the 18th. A team called Kent took part in the earliest known inter-county match, which was played on Dartford Brent in 1709.

Several famous players and patrons were involved in Kent cricket from then until 1842. Kent were generally regarded as the strongest county team in the first half of the 18th century, and were usually one of the main challengers to Hampshire, as organised by the Hambledon Club, in the second half. By the 1830s, Kent had again become the strongest county, and remained so until mid-century.

== Early cricket in Kent ==
Cricket is believed to have developed out of other bat-and-ball games, and was probably first played in early medieval times to the south and south-east of London in the geographical areas of the North Downs, the South Downs, and the Weald. Hence, the counties of Kent, Sussex, and Surrey were the ones from which the sport proliferated. The world's earliest known organised match took place in Kent, in around 1610. It was described as a "cricketing (sic) between Weald and Upland against Chalkhill, near Chevening in Kent". Cricket became established in Kent, and its neighbouring counties, through the 17th century with the development of village cricket, and it is possible that the earliest county teams were formed in the aftermath of the Restoration in 1660.

In 1705, a newspaper recorded an eleven-a-side match between West of Kent and Chatham at "Maulden" (probably Town Malling). Four years later, what is nominally the earliest known inter-county match took place when Kent met Surrey on Dartford Brent. It is generally believed, as asserted by G. B. Buckley, that "inter-county matches" till about 1730 were really inter-parish matches involving two villages on either side of a county boundary. Dartford was an important club in the first half of the 18th century, and its team at this time featured William Bedle, who is acknowledged to have been cricket's first great player. The 1709 match is the earliest known mention of Dartford Brent as a venue.

== 18th century ==
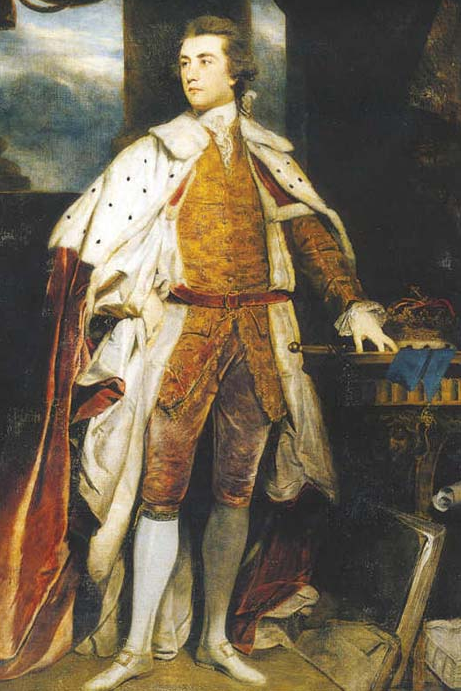
John Frederick Sackville, 3rd Duke of Dorset by Sir Joshua Reynolds, c.1767

In its Guide to Important Cricket Matches Played in the British Isles 1709–1863, the Association of Cricket Statisticians and Historians (ACS) recognises Kent as one of cricket's "major counties" throughout its entire history, and rates all Kent county matches in the 18th and 19th centuries, as well as many played by teams called East Kent or West Kent, as historically important. The ACS have explained that any match between a strong Kent eleven and another team justifies the classification, but caution is needed with nomenclature because of the different committees and sponsors who organised the games, and would sometimes use team names other than "Kent".

Dartford came under the patronage of Edwin Stead through the 1720s, and its team became representative of Kent as a county, often playing against teams from Sussex. Stead developed a keen rivalry with the Sussex patrons Charles Lennox, 2nd Duke of Richmond, and Sir William Gage. Their teams were named by either county or patron's XI. There were three Kent v Sussex matches in 1728, and Stead's team won them all. After the third win, the London Evening Post reported the outcome as "the third time this summer that the Kent men have been too expert for those of Sussex".

The 1728 proclamation of Kent's superiority is the first time that the concept of a "Champion County" can be seen in the sources, and it is augmented by a "turned the scales" comment made by a reporter after Sussex defeated Kent in 1729. The 1729 report added that the "scale of victory had been on the Kentish side for some years past". In 1730, the St James Evening Post referred to the "Kentish champions". In his cricket history, Harry Altham titled his third chapter, which was about cricket in the second quarter of the 18th century, as "Kent, The First Champions".

Strong teams played under the name of Kent throughout the 18th century with several famous patrons including Stead, Robert Colchin ("Long Robin"), Lord John Sackville, his son John Frederick Sackville, 3rd Duke of Dorset, and Sir Horatio Mann organising teams. In July 1739, the strength of Kent as a county team was recognised by the formation of an England team, loosely termed "England" or, more accurately, the "rest" of England, to play against them. Kent at this time were led by Lord John Sackville, and his team won the first England match on Bromley Common; the return on the Artillery Ground was drawn.

In 1744, the year in which the Laws of Cricket were first written as a code, Kent met England four times. The most famous encounter was the one on Monday, 18 June at the Artillery Ground which was commemorated in a poem by James Love, and is the subject of the world's second oldest scorecard. It is also the opening match in Scores and Biographies (although this erroneously records the date as 1746). Kent, whose team included both Colchin and Sackville, won the match by one wicket.

Under the Duke of Dorset and Sir Horatio Mann, Kent continued to field a strong team through the last quarter of the 18th century and were, along with Surrey, the main challengers to Hampshire, whose team was organised by the Hambledon Club. Dartford had played against a Hambledon team three times in 1756, and Kent played against Hampshire at Broadhalfpenny Down in 1768. Kent played numerous inter-county matches through the 1770s and 1780s, mostly against Hampshire and Surrey. Renowned Kent players in this period included William Bullen, Robert Clifford, Joseph Miller, and John Minshull. Large crowds were attracted to games in the county, and Derek Birley states in his history that 20,000 gathered at Bishopsbourne Paddock for a match against Hampshire in 1772. Kent remained an active county team until 1796 when, probably because of the Napoleonic War, county cricket ceased and was not resurrected until 1825, when Kent met Sussex at Brighton's Royal New Ground.

== 19th century ==
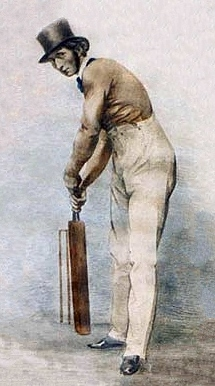
Fuller Pilch, who was signed by the Town Malling club.

In an 1822 match between Marylebone Cricket Club and Kent at Lord's, John Willes of Kent opened the bowling, and was no-balled for using a roundarm action, a style he had attempted to introduce since 1807. Willes promptly withdrew from the match, and refused to play again in any important fixture. His action proved the catalyst for the so-called "roundarm revolution".

With Jem Broadbridge and William Lillywhite bowling roundarm, Kent's rivals Sussex were the pre-eminent county team of the 1820s, and were invited to play against England in the 1827 roundarm trial matches. From 1830 to 1850, however, Kent enjoyed a period of supremacy in which their players were "nearly all professional". Derek Birley pointed out that matches were increasing being played over three days, and the typical amateur businessman could not spare that much time. As a result, Kent had just "two regular amateurs"—Nicholas Felix and Alfred Mynn—and Birley says they "might as well have been professionals". Rowland Bowen recorded that a Maidstone newspaper in 1837 described a match between Kent and Nottinghamshire as "for the County Championship". Kent was duly proclaimed Champion County in 1837, and through most of the 1840s.

During the period, the formation of the team was initially focused on Town Malling Cricket Club, backed by lawyers Thomas Selby and Silas Norton alongside William Harris, 2nd Baron Harris. Selby and Norton recruited "the best batsman in England", Fuller Pilch of Norfolk, to play at Town Malling, maintain the cricket ground, and run the connected public house. Alongside other players such as Mynn, Felix, Ned Wenman, and William Hillyer, Kent selected by Selby played eleven matches at Town Malling between 1836 and 1841. Despite success on the field, and the large attendances that the games attracted, Town Malling could not afford the expense of running county matches, and the club folded in 1841. The following year, Pilch moved to the Beverley club in Canterbury.

On 6 August 1842, formation of the original Kent County Cricket Club took place in Canterbury. The new club played its first match against England on the White Hart Field in Bromley on 25–27 August 1842. On 1 March 1859, a second county club was established in Maidstone to support the Canterbury club. The two were amalgamated in 1870 to form the present county club.

== Bibliography ==
- ACS (1981). A Guide to Important Cricket Matches Played in the British Isles 1709–1863. Nottingham: ACS. OCLC 85045528.
- Altham, H. S.; Swanton, E. W. (1962). A History of Cricket, Volume 1 (to 1914) (5th ed.). London: George Allen & Unwin. OCLC 894274808 – via Internet Archive.
- Birley, Derek (1999). A Social History of English Cricket. London: Aurum Press. ISBN 978-18-54107-10-7 – via Internet Archive.
- Bowen, Rowland (1970). Cricket: A History of its Growth and Development. London: Eyre & Spottiswoode. ISBN 978-04-13278-60-9.
- Buckley, G. B. (1935). Fresh Light on 18th Century Cricket. Birmingham: Cotterell & Co. OCLC 23450280.
- Buckley, G. B. (1937). Fresh Light on pre-Victorian Cricket. Birmingham: Cotterell & Co. OCLC 23469107.
- Carlaw, Derek (2020). Kent County Cricketers, A to Z: Part One (1806–1914) (PDF). Cardiff: ACS. ISBN 978-18-57702-50-7.
- Haygarth, Arthur (1996) [1862]. Scores & Biographies, Volume 1 (1744–1826). Kennington: Frederick Lillywhite. ISBN 978-19-00592-23-9.
- Major, John (2007). More Than A Game. London: HarperCollins. ISBN 978-00-07183-64-7 – via Internet Archive.
- Maun, Ian (2009). From Commons to Lord's, Volume One: 1700 to 1750. Cambridge: Roger Heavens. ISBN 978-19-00592-52-9.
- Maun, Ian (2011). From Commons to Lord's, Volume Two: 1751 to 1770. Leicester: Martin Wilson. ISBN 978-09-56906-60-1.
- Milton, Howard; Francis, Peter (2020). Kent County Cricket Grounds. Worthing: Pitch Publishing. ISBN 978-17-85316-61-6.
- Playfair (2025). Marshall, Ian (ed.). Playfair Cricket Annual. Headline. ISBN 978-1-0354-1179-5.
- Underdown, David (2000). Start of Play. Westminster: Allen Lane. ISBN 978-07-13993-30-1 – via Internet Archive.
- Waghorn, H. T. (1899). Cricket Scores, Notes, &c. From 1730–1773. Edinburgh: Blackwood. OCLC 1086375331.
- Waghorn, H. T. (2005) [1906]. The Dawn of Cricket. London: J. W. McKenzie. ISBN 978-09-47821-17-3.
- Webber, Roy (1960). The Phoenix History of Cricket. Charing Cross, London: Phoenix House Ltd. OCLC 5391059.
