= G. B. Buckley =

English surgeon and cricket historian (1885–1962)

- Born: George Bent Buckley; 1885; Saddleworth, England
- Died: 26 April 1962 (aged 77); Weston-super-Mare, England
- Occupation: Surgeon
- Known for: Cricket historian

George Bent Buckley MC MRCS (1885 – 26 April 1962) was an English surgeon and a celebrated cricket historian and an authority on the early days of the game.

Buckley was born in Saddleworth, then part of Yorkshire, the son of Arthur and Jane Buckley, his father was a solicitor. A surgeon by profession, he won the Military Cross in 1916 for working under fire when he was serving with the Royal Army Medical Corps in the First World War. The citation for the medal appeared in The London Gazette in November 1916 and reads as follows:

For conspicuous gallantry and devotion to duty. He tended and dressed the wounded under very heavy fire, displaying great courage and determination. He was wounded.

He was a senior surgeon at Manchester Royal Infirmary and member of the Manchester Medical Society. Photographs of him as a surgeon and soldier (prisoner of war) are held in the University of Manchester Library Image Collections.

After he retired, he devoted his time to researching early cricket history and travelled all over England to visit local libraries. He collected a mass of cricket historical material from old newspapers and dutifully noted every reference he could find relating to 18th century cricket. His researches were consolidated in his two classic books: Fresh Light on Eighteenth Century Cricket (1935) and Fresh Light on Pre-Victorian Cricket (1937).

He moved to Weston-super-Mare in 1938 and lived in a Victorian house close to the local cricket ground.

John Arlott states in the 1980 version of Barclay's World of Cricket that Mr Buckley's researches were continued in volumes of photo-reproduced typescript and manuscript, produced under the aegis of Rowland Bowen in 1960. It is probable that even more unpublished notes by Buckley still exist.

== Works by G. B. Buckley ==
- G. B. Buckley, Fresh Light on 18th Century Cricket, Cotterell, 1935. OCLC 23450280
- G. B. Buckley, Fresh Light on Pre-Victorian Cricket, Cotterell, 1937. OCLC 23469107

== External sources ==
- Obituary from 1963 edition of Wisden
