= History of English cricket (1801–1825) =

Development of cricket from 1801 to 1825

Through the Napoleonic Wars, county cricket virtually died as cricket was impacted by losses of investment and manpower.

== Impact of the Napoleonic Wars ==
With no national competition in place, there were few senior matches in the 18th and early 19th centuries. Even so, there is a noticeable difference between the number played each season in the 1790s and the handful per season of the 1800s and, much less, the 1810s. The ACS in its Important Matches guide has listed more than twenty in 1795, a time of stalemate in the French Revolutionary Wars; but only six in 1805, the year of the Battle of Trafalgar; and then just three for the whole period from 1811 to 1813 when British forces were heavily involved in the Peninsular War. Nevertheless, the impact of this war was less severe than that of the Seven Years' War because of the existence this time of MCC and other well-organised clubs like Brighton and Montpelier. These clubs managed to co-ordinate cricket activities through the war and, as it were, keep the game going.

In 1803, William Pitt referred to cricket when the Commons debated the Defence Bill that was later passed into law as the Defence of the Realm Act 1803. Pitt was then the effective Leader of the Opposition to the Whig government of Henry Addington. One of the Act's key requirements was that local authorities must list able-bodied men aged fifteen to sixty, and classify them in terms of fitness for military service. As increasing numbers of young men entered service, cricket went into decline and, on 17 September 1813, the Nottingham Review said: "The manly and athletic game at cricket for which the boys of Sherwood have been so long and so justly famed, it was thought, had fallen into disuse, if not disgrace...." Also, there is a view expressed by Rowland Bowen that the game had gone out of fashion in addition to the wartime problems it faced.

The first cricketer known to have died on active service was Richard Beckett of Leeds, whose senior career spanned the 1804 to 1807 seasons. He joined the Coldstream Guards and, as a captain, was killed at the Battle of Talavera on 28 July 1809.

A discernible recovery began in 1815 as the Napoleonic Wars ended after the Battle of Waterloo on 18 June. Six senior matches have been recorded from that summer and the first centuries were scored at the new Lord's ground in St John's Wood. The centuries were scored in the Middlesex v Epsom match on 24 & 25 August by Felix Ladbroke and Frederick Woodbridge who scored 116 and 107 respectively for Epsom.

Among debutants in 1815 was Algernon Greville, better known as the Duke of Wellington's private secretary from 1819. Greville fought at Waterloo as an ensign. He played in seven senior matches until 1823.

== MCC and Lord's ==
=== Old Ground ===
Marylebone Cricket Club (MCC), based at Lord's Old Ground until 1810, continued to play the leading role in the sport. Several matches of the 1800s involved the more prominent town clubs such as Homerton, Montpelier, Richmond and Woolwich.

By the 1800s, Lord's Old Ground was already losing its rural character as London expanded and began to surround it. The landowning Portman Estate felt able to increase the rent and so Thomas Lord decided to seek another venue. The lease on the Old Ground was due to expire on Lady Day (25 March) in 1810 but Lord moved fast and, by May 1809, had secured a lease on another plot of land, part of the St John's Wood estate which belonged to the Eyre family. The match in August 1810 between Captain Blagrave's XI and Colonel Byng's XI is the last known to have been played on Lord's Old Ground.

=== Middle Ground ===
Lord opened his "Middle Ground" in time for the 1809 season but MCC at first refused to relocate. The Middle Ground was used by St John's Wood Cricket Club while MCC continued to play at the Old Ground. In the winter of 1810–11, Lord staged a fait accompli by seizing "his turf" which was dug up and moved to the Middle Ground. Despite the opposition voiced by some members, MCC were obliged to follow.

Records of only three senior matches have been found for the years 1811 to 1813 with the war taking an increasing toll of cricket's manpower and investment. All were played at the Middle Ground and are the only known senior matches played there. Benjamin Aislabie's XI v George Osbaldeston's XI at the Middle Ground on 8–9 July 1811; Lord Frederick Beauclerk's XI v George Osbaldeston's XI at the Middle Ground on 15–17 June 1812; and Lord Frederick Beauclerk's XI v Edward Bligh's XI on 7–9 June 1813 – this was the last senior match known to have been played on the Middle Ground. James Rice played in all three and they are the only ones he is known to have played in.

In 1813, the site of the Middle Ground was requisitioned by Parliament for construction of the Regent's Canal. Lord contacted the Eyre Estate and persuaded them to lease him another parcel of land in St John's Wood, about half a mile further north at a place called North Bank. This site had previously been a duckpond.

=== Lord's – the current ground ===
In the winter of 1813–14, Lord again had his turf dug up and removed. He built a high perimeter fence, a tavern and a pavilion at what became the current Lord's ground. On 22 June 1814, MCC played the first match at Lord's against Hertfordshire, then as now a minor county team. The first match of importance at Lord's was played 13–15 July 1814 when MCC hosted St John's Wood CC, whose team included a number of Surrey county players. St John's Wood CC was incorporated into MCC soon afterwards.

=== MCC – influence and controversy ===
By 1816, the new Lord's had become cricket's feature venue and MCC was gradually increasing its influence and control. It made efforts to suppress the gambling that had underwritten and sometimes blighted cricket in the past.

But MCC was by no means in full control of events. It was the subject of bitter controversy in the post-war period, largely because of the activities of Lord Frederick Beauclerk, one of the sport's more dubious personalities who effectively "ran" the MCC Committee for many years. There was fierce infighting between Beauclerk and his enemy George Osbaldeston which finally erupted into a match-fixing scandal. In 1817, soon after his unique achievement of scoring two centuries in the same match, it was alleged that William Lambert had "sold" an earlier Nottingham v England match. Nottingham had won the game by 30 runs despite a first innings deficit and many gamblers lost heavily. MCC banned Lambert from Lord's for life. Whether he was actually guilty is questionable as no proper hearing was ever organised. The whole affair may have been contrived by Beauclerk to settle an "old score". After MCC banned Lambert in 1817, his patron Osbaldeston struck his own name from the MCC members list in anger in 1818. He later repented and tried to restore himself but his application was blocked by Beauclerk. Osbaldeston could no longer play at Lord's and that effectively ended his senior career.

In 1822, MCC appointed Benjamin Aislabie as its first honorary secretary (to 1842). Aislabie was a rich wine merchant and the owner of slave-operated plantations in the West Indies.

=== The crisis of 1825 ===
In 1825, the club almost foundered in the face of a dual crisis. On Thursday, 28 July, a schools match at Lord's between Harrow and Winchester had just concluded. Then, during the night, the pavilion was destroyed by fire with the consequent loss of valuable scorecards, records and trophies. Lord claimed he lost £2,600 in paid subscriptions, none of which were ever recovered. Many irreplaceable documents which recorded early cricket matches are believed to have been lost. The impact of this upon cricket's history is that it is only since 1825 that surviving records can be viewed with anything like complete confidence.

Later that year, MCC members were outraged when Lord proposed to build houses on the land. William Ward, who was a rich banker as well as a good batsman, stepped in and purchased the ground lease of Lord's to save it for cricket.

Also in 1825, Charles James Barnett became the earliest known president of MCC. This is an annual appointment and there may have been earlier presidents but there is no record of them, perhaps because the records were lost in the fire.

== Schools and universities ==
The Eton v Harrow match was first definitely recorded at Lord's in 1805 but, according to a Harrovian who played in that match, the fixture also took place in 1804 with Harrow winning. Lord Byron played for Harrow in 1805.

On 30 May 1817, Cambridge University played Cambridge Town Club at Parker's Piece, Cambridge, the first recorded instance of a fixture which became almost annual until the 1860s and the earliest match involving either team. There was a very fine line between Cambridge Town Club and the later Cambridgeshire County Cricket Club, the one dovetailing with the other.

== Noted people ==
William Lambert made his known senior debut playing for Surrey against England at Lord's on 20 July 1801. He became, in Haygarth's words, "one of the most successful cricketers that has ever yet appeared, excelling as he did in batting, bowling, fielding, keeping wicket, and also single wicket playing".

E. H. Budd, who went on to become one of the most famous batsmen of the early 19th century, made his known senior debut in 1802.

Thomas Howard, one of the most outstanding fast bowlers of the underarm era, made his known senior debut on 4–6 July 1803 when he played for Hampshire against a combined Nottinghamshire & Leicestershire team at Lord's.

John Sherman made his senior debut in 1809. His career continued to 1852 and at 44 seasons is the joint-longest on record, equalled only by W. G. Grace from 1865 to 1908.

Jem Broadbridge, who became an outstanding all-rounder in the 1820s, made his known senior debut on 22 July 1814 in a Beauclerk v Osbaldeston match at Goodwood Park.

In 1820, two noteworthy debutants were Fuller Pilch (aged 17) and George T. Knight. Pilch, then of Norfolk, later played for Kent. He is widely held to have been W. G. Grace's predecessor as the greatest-ever batsman. Knight, who was a nephew of Jane Austen, became a prominent member of MCC and played a significant part in the introduction and legalisation of roundarm bowling between 1825 and 1835. He was himself a fast bowler who favoured the roundarm style.

The 1822 debutants included the left-handed batsman James Saunders, noted for his expertise in playing the square cut shot.

Two of the greatest players of the 19th century, bowler William Lillywhite and wicket-keeper Ned Wenman, made their first known appearances in 1825.

Active players, administrators and other contributors of the period included:

- William Ashby
- Charles James Barnett
- Thomas Beagley
- Lord Frederick Beauclerk
- Richard Beckett
- Billy Beldham
- Henry Bentley
- John Bentley
- Edward Bligh
- John Bowyer
- Thomas Boxall
- Samuel Bridger
- Jem Broadbridge
- George Brown
- E. H. Budd
- William Capel
- George Coles
- Thomas Flavel
- Charles Greville
- Algernon Greville
- Thomas Howard
- John Hammond
- Herbert Jenner
- Douglas Kinnaird
- George T. Knight
- Felix Ladbroke
- William Lambert
- Richard Leigh Jr
- George Leycester
- William Lillywhite
- Thomas Lord
- Noah Mann junior
- Thomas Mellish
- Mary Russell Mitford
- George Osbaldeston
- John Pointer
- Robert Robinson
- James Saunders
- James Sherman
- John Sherman
- John Sparks
- W. Turner
- Thomas Vigne
- William Ward
- John Wells
- Ned Wenman
- John Willes
- Frederick Woodbridge

== Achievements ==
In 1805, Lord Frederick Beauclerk became the first batsman known to have scored two centuries in the same season. He made 129* for Hampshire v England in July and 102 for England v Surrey in August.

On 2–5 July 1817, Sussex v Epsom was played at Lord's. William Lambert, guesting for Sussex, scored two centuries (107* & 157) in the match, the first player known to have achieved this feat in an important match.

On 24 July 1820, William Ward scored 278 for MCC against Norfolk at Lord's, the earliest-known double century in all forms of cricket. Ward established a new world record for the highest individual innings, beating James Aylward's score of 167 in 1777. Ward's record survived for 56 years until W. G. Grace scored the first-ever triple-century with an innings of 344 for the Gentlemen of MCC against Kent at Canterbury in 1876.

== Matches, venues and teams ==
=== The Bs ===
Matches during this period were arranged on an ad hoc basis and many teams were invitation XIs, some of them given unusual names. One of these, created in 1805, was "The Bs", although it was not a one-off and reformed several times until 1832. Billy Beldham, for example, played for The Bs four times. Their most famous match was on 12–14 June 1810, against England at Lord's Old Ground. The Bs were two men short and were joined by John Wells and James Lawrell as given men. According to Haygarth, Lawrell was only involved because he had backed the team: "certainly not for his excellence as a cricketer, as in the case of Wells".

The Bs batted first and scored 137. In reply, England were dismissed for 100. With a lead of 37 in difficult batting conditions, the Bs were in a strong position as they began their second innings. Any hopes they had of making a decent total quickly disappeared as they were bowled out for only 6. Five of their runs were scored by Wells (4) and Lawrell (1); only one B, Samuel Bridger, scored a run, though John Bentley was the not out batsman and E. H. Budd was absent injured. There were only three scoring shots because Wells hit a boundary. John Hammond dismissed at least six of the nine batsmen who were out, including five bowled. Chasing a total of 44 runs to win, England soon lost their first four wickets, but Robert Robinson scored 23 not out and they won by 6 wickets.

The Bs total of 6 is sometimes listed as the world record for the lowest innings total, but the match was played long before the official commencement of first class cricket and is not recognised by either Wisden or Playfair, among others. (Note: Some eleven-a-side matches played from 1772 to 1863 have been rated "first-class" by certain sources. However, the term only came into common use around 1864, when overarm bowling was legalised. It was formally defined as a standard by a meeting at Lord's, in May 1894, of Marylebone Cricket Club (MCC) and the county clubs which were then competing in the County Championship. The ruling was effective from the beginning of the 1895 season, but pre-1895 matches of the same standard have no official definition of status because the ruling is not retrospective. Matches of a similar standard since the beginning of the 1864 season are generally considered to have an unofficial first-class status. Pre-1864 matches which are included in the ACS' "Important Match Guide" may generally be regarded as important or, at least, historically significant. For further information, see First-class cricket.)

=== England Elevens ===
England teams played in most of the senior matches from 1801 to 1810. There were none in the main war years of 1811–1814. From 1815 to 1825, there were twelve, a significant reduction in proportion compared with 1801–1810.

== County cricket ==
The first reference to cricket in the county of Cornwall is dated 1813.

According to Wisden, a forerunner of Northamptonshire County Cricket Club may have been founded in 1820 but, if so, it was subject to reformation and substantial reorganisation in 1878. The current club recognises 1878 as its foundation date.

There is evidence in 1824 of a county club having been formed in Devon, though the current Devon County Cricket Club dates from 1899.

In 1825, inter-county cricket was revived for the first time since 1796. Sussex played two matches each (home and away) against Hampshire and Kent, the home team winning every time. Hampshire and Kent did not play each other.

== Gentlemen v Players ==
The first two Gentlemen v Players matches took place in 1806 but the fixture was not revived until 1819.

Gentlemen v Players was revived in 1819. It had first been played in 1806, when there were two matches, but not since then. It was played in most seasons from 1819 to 1962, typically twice a year. The fixture was described by H. S. Altham as the "most famous of all domestic matches". In the 1819 match, the Players won by six wickets. There was only one run between the teams on first innings, but the Gentlemen collapsed in the second against the bowling of Thomas Howard and John Sherman to be all out for only 60. Charles Greville, the noted diarist, made his known senior debut in this match, playing for the Gentlemen. Another debutant was the Sussex fast bowler George Brown, widely known as "Brown of Brighton", who had a reputation for bowling at extreme pace.

In the fourth Gentlemen v Players match, played at Lord's in June 1820, the Gentlemen selected star Players bowler Thomas Howard as a given man, and won the match by 70 runs.

In the fifth Gentlemen v Players match, played at Lord's in July 1821, Thomas Beagley scored the first century in the series with 113 not out for the Players. The Gentlemen had been dismissed for 60 in their first innings and then, after the Players made 270 for 6, the Gentlemen gave up and conceded the game. It was a "Coronation Match" to celebrate the accession of the unpopular King George IV and Derek Birley commented that it was "a suitably murky affair". The match marked the final senior appearance of Billy Beldham in a career lasting from 1782.

The 1824 match at Lord's was an odds game with 14 on the Gentlemen team, but the Players still won by 103 runs.

== Single wicket ==
John Major lists eight important single wicket events during the period. One was the notorious Lambert & Osbaldeston v Beauclerk & Howard match at the Old Ground on 6–7 July 1810.

== Rules and equipment ==
In 1801, MCC made revisions to the Laws of Cricket which were republished in their entirety.

In 1809, MCC made further revisions to the Laws of Cricket which were again republished in their entirety. Among the changes were the umpires being required to select the pitch; choice of innings to be decided by toss; no-ball applied to the bowler's foot being over the crease.

In 1810, an American visitor drew a sharp distinction between cricket as played in England and "our cricket", referring especially to the "old long low wicket" still used in America.

No-ball rule applied to throwing in 1816.

The earliest mention of wicket-keeping gloves occurs in 1820.

In 1823, the size of the wicket was increased to 27 × 8 inches.

=== Roundarm ===
In 1807, John Willes of Kent first tried to revive the idea of "straight-armed" (i.e., roundarm) bowling, which had originated with Tom Walker in the 1790s.

During the post-war years, there was a discernible shift towards the adoption of roundarm and questions about its legalisation dominated the sport for thirty years. The issue was already controversial enough in 1816 for MCC to amend the Laws of Cricket to prohibit it:

The ball must be bowled (not thrown or jerked), and be delivered underhand, with the hand below the elbow. But if the ball be jerked, or the arm extended from the body horizontally, and any part of the hand be uppermost, or the hand horizontally extended when the ball is delivered, the Umpires shall call "No Ball"

The issue came to a head in 1822 when, in the MCC v Kent match at Lord's, Willes opened the bowling for Kent and was no-balled for using a roundarm action. He promptly withdrew from the match and refused to play again in any significant fixture. Roundarm was a natural reaction to the growing predominance of batsmen over the age-old underarm style of bowling. Its adherents argued that the legalisation of roundarm was essential to restore the balance between batting and bowling. However, high-scoring matches were still comparatively rare owing to vagaries in pitch conditions.

== Literature ==
In 1801, Thomas Boxall published the earliest known instructional book on cricket called Rules and Instructions for Playing at the Game of Cricket.

In 1819, Mary Russell Mitford began writing a series of sketches of village life which were published in The Lady's Magazine. They were subsequently collected in book form as Our Village. One piece was a description of a cricket match which has been described as "the first major prose on the game".

In 1823, Henry Bentley published his Correct Account of all Matches, 1786–1822 with supplements appearing to 1825.

== See also ==
- History of English cricket (1776–1800)
- History of English cricket (1826–1845)

== Bibliography ==
- ACS (1981). A Guide to Important Cricket Matches Played in the British Isles 1709–1863. Nottingham: ACS. OCLC 85045528.
- ACS (1982). A Guide to First-class Cricket Matches Played in the British Isles. Nottingham: ACS. OCLC 10586869.
- Barclays (1986). Swanton, E. W.; Plumptre, George; Woodcock, John (eds.). Barclays World of Cricket. London: HarperCollins. ISBN 978-00-02181-93-8.
- Birley, Derek (1999). A Social History of English Cricket. London: Aurum Press. ISBN 978-18-54107-10-7 – via Internet Archive.
- Bowen, Rowland (1970). Cricket: A History of its Growth and Development. London: Eyre & Spottiswoode. ISBN 978-04-13278-60-9.
- Emsley, Clive (1979). British Society and the French Wars, 1793–1815. London: Macmillan. ISBN 978-08-47661-15-2.
- Haygarth, Arthur (1996) [1862]. Scores & Biographies, Volume 1 (1744–1826). Kennington: Frederick Lillywhite. ISBN 978-19-00592-23-9.
- Haygarth, Arthur (1997) [1862]. Scores & Biographies, Volume 2 (1827–1840). Kennington: Frederick Lillywhite. ISBN 978-19-00592-23-9.
- Major, John (2007). More Than A Game. London: HarperCollins. ISBN 978-00-07183-64-7 – via Internet Archive.
- Warner, Pelham (1946). Lords: 1787–1945. London: Harrap. OCLC 877106024.
