= List of occasional English cricket XIs =

This is a list of ad hoc English cricket teams, each of them known as an XI (eleven), which were temporarily formed to play in matches that are recognised as either important or first-class. Generally, they were "scratch" teams named after their patron or organiser. The list is not necessarily exhaustive.

Note that long-established XIs are included at List of historically important English cricket teams, and not here.

A † symbol indicates that the team has a redirect to this page.

== Teams ==
=== A ===
- B. Aislabie's XI (1811)
- S. Amherst's XI (1789)

=== B ===
- J. Bamford's XI (1907–1909)
- R. G. Barlow's XI (1883)
- W. Barton's XI (1802)
- Lord Frederick Beauclerk's XI (1798–1817)
- R. A. Bennett's XI (1901/02)
- Captain Blagrave's XI (1810)
- E. Bligh's XI (1792–1813)
- Ivo Bligh's XI (1880–1883)
- John Bowra's XI (1747)
- Lord Brackley's XI (1905/06)
- E. H. Budd's XI (1816–1818)
- Colonel Byng's XI (1810)

=== C ===
- F. S. G. Calthorpe's XI (1926)
- W. R. Capel's XI (1803)
- Thomas Chambers' XI (1731)
- 3rd Duke of Cleveland's XI (1751)
- Sir St Vincent Cotton's XI (1832)
- † Country XI (1751) (Note: In a match on 19 August 1751, London played "A Country XI" on the Artillery Ground. London scored 30 and 5; the Country XI replied with 24 and 6. London won by 5 runs.)
- Lord Cowdray's XI (1923–1924)

=== D ===
- Richard Daft's XI (1870–1880)
- Earl of Darnley's XI (1790–1796)
- Earl de la Warr's XI (1896)
- C. de Trafford's XI (1896)
- Stephen Dingate's XI (1746–1750)

=== E ===
- G. East's XI (1788)
- T. Emmett's XI (1881–1883)

=== F ===
- Tom Faulkner's XI (1747–1754)
- Nicholas Felix's XI (1846)
- H. K. Foster's XI (1912–1919)
- Frederick, Prince of Wales' XI (1733)
- C. B. Fry's XI (1912)

=== G ===
- J. Gibbons' XI (1800)

=== H ===
- L. Hall's XI (1885–1891)
- John Hammond's XI (1790)
- David Harris' XI (1793)
- H. T. Hewett's XI (1892)
- H. Hoare's XI (1824)
- C. G. Howard's XI (1956/57)

=== J ===
- G. L. Jessop's XI (1911)
- S. B. Joel's XI (1924/25)
- V. W. C. Jupp's XI (1926)

=== K ===
- D. J. W. Kinnaird's XI (1814)

=== L ===
- F. C. Ladbroke's XI (1809)
- W. H. Laverton's XI (1890)
- Left-handed XI (1790–1870)
- R. Leigh's XI (1793–1795)
- Charles Lennox's XI (1795–1802)
- George Leycester's XI (1802)
- James Lillywhite's XI (1876/77)
- H. J. Lloyd's XI (1825)
- Lord Londesborough's XI (1886–1913)
- George Louch's XI (1793)
- R. S. Lucas' XI (1894/95)

=== M ===
- A. C. MacLaren's XI (1901/02)
- Lord March's XI (1886)
- Sir H. W. Marten's XI (1800)
- J. R. Mason's XI (1913)
- T. Mellish's XI (1801–1807)
- E. G. Morant's XI (1793)

=== N ===
- R. Newman's XI (1793)
- 1st Earl of Northumberland's XI (1751)

=== O ===
- George Osbaldeston's XI (1811–1816)

=== P ===
- L. Parkinson's XI (1933–1935)
- G. Parr's XI (1859–1864)
- H. Philipson's XI (1891)
- Fuller Pilch's XI (1846)
- R. Pilling's XI (1889)
- Charles Powlett's XI (1788)
- A. A. Priestley's XI (1897)

=== R ===
- W. W. Read's XI (1881–1895)
- 1st Duke of Richmond's XI (1702) (Note: Charles Lennox, 1st Duke of Richmond, is believed to have been active in cricket patronage for several years, but the only match in which he is definitely known to have been involved was one against Arundel in 1702, which his team apparently won.)
- A. W. Ridley's XI (1879)
- Right-handed XI (1790–1870)
- D. H. Robins' XI (1960–1980)
- L. G. Robinson's XI (1910–1921)

=== S ===
- J. Sharp's XI (1923)
- M. Sherwin's XI (1889–1891)
- A. Shrewsbury's XI (1888–1893)
- T. A. Smith's XI (1787–1796)
- H. H. Stephenson's XI (1859–1885)
- A. E. Stoddart's XI (1894–1898)
- Lord Strathavon's XI (1832)

=== T ===
- L. H. Tennyson's XI (1923–1938) (Note: The team was called L. H. Tennyson's XI from 1923 to 1928, and then Lord Tennyson's XI from 1932 to 1938.)
- Test and County Cricket Board XI (1981–1996)
- John Tufton's XI (1798)
- W. Turner's XI (1801)

=== V ===
- G. F. Vernon's XI (1889/90)

=== W ===
- R. D. Walker's XI (1866)
- Tom Walker's XI (1793)
- William Ward's XI (1815–1825)
- P. F. Warner's XI (1903–1946)
- A. J. Webbe's XI (1885–1901)
- G. J. V. Weigall's XI (1904–1914)
- R. Whitehead's XI (1799)
- H. C. Woolridge's XI (1803)
- G. N. Wyatt's XI (1886)

=== Y ===
- Lord Yarmouth's XI (1799)

== See also ==
- Earliest references to cricket in English and Welsh counties
- First known use of English cricket venues (1610–1825)
- List of historically important English cricket teams

== Bibliography ==
- ACS (1981). A Guide to Important Cricket Matches Played in the British Isles 1709–1863. Nottingham: ACS. OCLC 85045528.
- Major, John (2007). More Than A Game. London: HarperCollins. ISBN 978-00-07183-64-7 – via Internet Archive.
- McCann, Tim (2004). Sussex Cricket in the Eighteenth Century (PDF). Vol. 88. Lewes: West Sussex Record Office. ISBN 978-08-54450-55-8.
