= John Evans (Kent cricketer) =

English cricketer (1820s)

John Evans (dates unknown) was an English professional cricketer who played from 1822 to 1823. He was mainly associated with Kent, and made six known appearances in historically important matches.

== Career ==
John Evans has uncertain origin but, as he made his known debut in 1822, he was probably born in the 1790s, or possibly the early 1800s. Primary sources have said he came from one of Bromley, Chislehurst, or Blackheath. He has been described as a "stiff-armed bat", hand unknown, and he did not bowl. He played in four historically important matches for Kent, all of them against Marylebone Cricket Club (MCC), and he also made two appearances for the Players of Kent against the Gentlemen of Kent.

=== MCC v Kent, July 1822 ===
Evans is first recorded in the MCC v Kent match at Lord's on 15/16 July 1822. This was the historic match in which John Willes attempted to introduce roundarm bowling to Lord's. Having been no balled by the umpire, who was either Henry Bentley or Noah Mann Jr, Willes "threw down the ball in disgust", and left the ground "in high dudgeon". It is generally believed that the incident was instigated by Lord Frederick Beauclerk, who is said to have favoured roundarm when the bowler was on his team but, "when against him, the contrary". Willes' abrupt departure left Kent a man short, and another player—possibly Evans—was brought in to replace him.

Despite the loss of Willes, Kent won the match by an innings and four runs. MCC scored 207 in their first innings, and Kent replied with 259. According to the match scorecard, Evans opened the batting with James Jordan, and scored 8 runs before he was stumped by Thomas Vigne. In their second innings, MCC were all out for only 48, which gave Kent the innings victory. Evans held two catches to dismiss E. H. Budd and Thomas Bache.

In his coverage of the match, Haygarth included a biographical note about Evans, saying that he was successful as a batter, and "why he did not oftener play for Kent is now unknown". Haygarth added that he had tried to source Evans' background, but without success.

=== Other matches ===
Kent and MCC played a return match, 25–27 July 1822, on Chislehurst Common at the West Kent Cricket Club Ground, then known as the New Ground. Ashley-Cooper says the MCC team was called "MCC & Ground". Evans was eighth in the batting order, according to the scorecard, and made 7 and 14. He held one catch to dismiss Thomas Vigne without scoring. Kent had another convincing win, this time by 149 runs.

In 1823, Evans scored 90* at Chislehurst, and James Jordan scored 109 in the same innings, the earliest known century by a Kent player in a top-class match.

== Later years ==
Evans was active as a player in the Blackheath area until the late 1840s. Details of his death are unknown.

== Bibliography ==
- Altham, H. S.; Swanton, E. W. (1962). A History of Cricket, Volume 1 (to 1914) (5th ed.). London: George Allen & Unwin. OCLC 894274808.
- Ashley-Cooper, F. S. (1929). Kent Cricket Matches, 1719–1880. Canterbury: Gibbs & Sons. OCLC 220674085.
- Birley, Derek (1999). A Social History of English Cricket. London: Aurum Press. ISBN 978-18-54107-10-7 – via Internet Archive.
- Carlaw, Derek (2020). Kent County Cricketers, A to Z: Part One (1806–1914) (PDF). Cardiff: ACS. ISBN 978-18-57702-50-7.
- Haygarth, Arthur (1996) [1862]. Scores & Biographies, Volume 1 (1744–1826). Kennington: Frederick Lillywhite. ISBN 978-19-00592-23-9.
