= 1823 English cricket season =

Cricket season review

The 1823 English cricket season was the 37th since the foundation of Marylebone Cricket Club (MCC). Henry Bentley issued his Correct Account of all Matches, 1786–1822. Details of seven historically important eleven-a-side matches are known. (Note: Any match listed in the ACS' Important Match Guide (1981) is historically important, and therefore of the highest standard, whether or not a scorecard might exist. The same applies to numerous matches discovered by researchers since 1981. For further information, see First-class cricket.)

== Events ==
- Henry Bentley issued his Correct Account of all Matches, 1786–1822 with supplements appearing to 1825.
- Earliest known reference to cricket in Herefordshire.
- The size of the wicket was increased to 27 × 8 inches.
- Seven matches were recorded in 1823:
  - 9 June – Marylebone Cricket Club (MCC) v Sussex @ Lord's Cricket Ground
  - 16 June – England v The Bs @ Lord's Cricket Ground
  - 23 June – Sussex v Marylebone Cricket Club (MCC) @ Royal New Ground, Brighton
  - 7 July – Marylebone Cricket Club (MCC) v Kent @ Lord's Cricket Ground
  - 21 July – Gentlemen v Players @ Lord's Cricket Ground
  - 28 July – Kent v Marylebone Cricket Club (MCC) @ West Kent CC, Chislehurst
  - 14–18 August – Hampshire v England @ Bramshill Park, Hampshire

== Bibliography ==
- ACS (1981). A Guide to Important Cricket Matches Played in the British Isles 1709–1863. Nottingham: ACS. OCLC 85045528.
- Haygarth, Arthur (1996) [1862]. Scores & Biographies, Volume 1 (1744–1826). Kennington: Frederick Lillywhite. ISBN 978-19-00592-23-9.
- Warner, Pelham (1946). Lords: 1787–1945. London: Harrap. OCLC 877106024.
