= Aubrey Beauclerk (cricketer) =

English cricketer

Personal information
- Full name: Aubrey Frederick James Beauclerk
- Born: 3 May 1817; Kimpton, Hertfordshire, England
- Died: 3 January 1853 (aged 35); Swindon, Wiltshire, England
- Batting: Unknown
- Relatives: Lord Frederick Beauclerk (father); Charles Beauclerk (brother); Lord Burford (cousin)

Domestic team information
- Years: Team
- 1837: Marylebone Cricket Club

Career statistics
Competition	First-class
Matches	2
Runs scored	13
Batting average	4.33
100s/50s	–/–
Top score	7
Balls bowled	–
Wickets	–
Bowling average	–
5 wickets in innings	–
10 wickets in match	–
Best bowling	–
Catches/stumpings	1/–
- Source: Cricinfo, 24 March 2015

Aubrey Frederick James Beauclerk (3 May 1817 – 3 January 1853) was an English cricketer active in 1837, playing in two first-class cricket matches.

The son of Lord Frederick Beauclerk and Charlotte Dillon-Lee, Beauclerk attended Charterhouse School from 1826, and he later made two appearances in first-class cricket in 1837. His first appearance came for the Marylebone Cricket Club against Oxford University, while his second appearance came for The Bs against the Marylebone Cricket Club. He scored a total of 13 runs in his two matches, with a top score of 7. Outside of cricket he was also a captain in the British Army, serving in the Guards and 7th Foot. He died, unmarried, at Swindon, Wiltshire, on 3 January 1853.

His father, brother Charles, and cousin Lord Burford were all first-class cricketers.
