= George Quentin =

George Quentin may refer to:

- George Quentin (cricketer) (1848–1928), Indian-born English cricketer
- George Augustus Quentin (1760–1851), Hanoverian British Army officer
