= 1805 English cricket season =

Cricket season review

The 1805 English cricket season was the 19th since the foundation of Marylebone Cricket Club (MCC). Lord Frederick Beauclerk became the first batsman known to have scored two centuries in the same season. Details of ten historically important eleven-a-side matches are known. (Note: Any match listed in the ACS' Important Match Guide (1981) is historically important, and therefore of the highest standard, whether or not a scorecard might exist. The same applies to numerous matches discovered by researchers since 1981. For further information, see First-class cricket.)

== Events ==
- Lord Frederick Beauclerk became the first batsman known to have scored two centuries in a season when he made 129* for Hampshire v England in July and 102 for England v Surrey in August.
- In what was the first definitely recorded Eton v Harrow match at Lord's Old Ground, the future poet Lord Byron played for Harrow.
- With the Napoleonic War continuing, loss of investment and manpower impacted cricket and only six historically important matches have been recorded from 1805:
  - Monday, 24 June: England v Surrey @ Lord's Old Ground
  - Monday, 1 to Wednesday, 3 July: England v Hampshire @ Lord's Old Ground
  - Monday, 8 to Wednesday, 10 July: England v The Bs @ Lord's Old Ground
  - Monday, 15 to Tuesday, 16 July: England v Hampshire @ Lord's Old Ground
  - Monday, 5 to Wednesday, 7 August: EnglandI v SurreyI @ Lord's Old Ground
  - Tuesday, 13 to Wednesday, 14 August: EnglandI v SurreyI @ Lord's Old Ground

== Other matches ==
Aside from the six matches above which are generally regarded as having been important by reference to various substantial sources (including the ACS, Britcher and Haygarth), there were eight other matches first noted by Britcher and confirmed by Haygarth:

- 22–25 July: Twenty-Three v Twelve at Lord's
- 12 August: Richmond v Homerton at Richmond Green
- 21 August: Richmond v Homerton at Richmond Green
- 24 August: Rick & Uxbridge v St Albans at Lord Essex's Park
- 29–30 August: Kent v Bexley at Dartford Heath
- 16–17 September: England III v Surrey III at Lord's
- 21 September: Waltham Abbey v Homerton at Waltham Marsh, Essex
- 23 September: Kent v Bexley at Judge's Ground, Maidstone

== Bibliography ==
- ACS (1981). A Guide to Important Cricket Matches Played in the British Isles 1709–1863. Nottingham: ACS. OCLC 85045528.
- Haygarth, Arthur (1996) [1862]. Scores & Biographies, Volume 1 (1744–1826). Kennington: Frederick Lillywhite. ISBN 978-19-00592-23-9.
- Warner, Pelham (1946). Lords: 1787–1945. London: Harrap. OCLC 877106024.
