= History of English cricket (1776–1800) =

Development of cricket from 1776 to 1800

The period from 1776 to 1800 saw significant growth and development in English cricket to the point that it became a popular sport nationwide, having outgrown its origin in the south-eastern counties. Prominent northern clubs were established at Nottingham and Sheffield.

== History ==
Cricket has its first documented mentions in Canada (1785) and the West Indies (1780; in Barbados). British clubs were established in India in Calcutta (1792) and, following the siege there, Seringapatam (1799). In America, the game was popular among soldiers in the revolution and George Washington is known to have played in at least one game.

At the highest level of English cricket, two clubs pre-dominated – Hambledon from the early 1770s until the late 1780s and then Marylebone Cricket Club, known as MCC, from its foundation in 1787. County cricket thrived during the Hambledon period. The Hambledon Club organised matches played by the Hampshire team, who often challenged teams representing the rest of England. (Note: Any match listed in the ACS' Important Match Guide (1981) is historically important, and therefore of the highest standard, whether or not a scorecard might exist. The same applies to numerous matches discovered by researchers since 1981. For further information, see First-class cricket.) Soon after its foundation, MCC assumed ownership of the Laws and re-drafted them in 1788.

Leading players of the period included batsmen John Small and Billy Beldham; bowlers Lumpy Stevens and David Harris; and the controversial all-rounder Lord Frederick Beauclerk. Throughout the period, underarm bowling prevailed by means of a pitched delivery, this method having been recently introduced in the 1760s. In response to pitching of the ball, the modern straight bat had been created, replacing the old curved bat which had itself replaced the "hockey stick" design that had been in use when balls were bowled all along the ground.

== See also ==
- History of English cricket (1751–1775)
- History of English cricket (1801–1825)

== Bibliography ==
- ACS (1981). A Guide to Important Cricket Matches Played in the British Isles 1709–1863. Nottingham: ACS. OCLC 85045528.
- Altham, H. S.; Swanton, E. W. (1962). A History of Cricket, Volume 1 (to 1914) (5th ed.). London: George Allen & Unwin. OCLC 894274808.
- Buckley, G. B. (1935). Fresh Light on 18th Century Cricket. Birmingham: Cotterell & Co. OCLC 23450280.
- Major, John (2007). More Than A Game. London: HarperCollins. ISBN 978-00-07183-64-7 – via Internet Archive.
