= 1801 English cricket season =

Cricket season review

The 1801 English cricket season was the 15th since the foundation of Marylebone Cricket Club (MCC). The famous batsman William Lambert made his debut in historically important matches. Details of eight historically important eleven-a-side matches are known. (Note: Any match listed in the ACS' Important Match Guide (1981) is historically important, and therefore of the highest standard, whether or not a scorecard might exist. The same applies to numerous matches discovered by researchers since 1981. For further information, see First-class cricket.)

== Events ==
- Marylebone Cricket Club (MCC) made revisions to the Laws of Cricket which were republished in their entirety.
- Thomas Boxall published the earliest known instructional book on cricket called Rules and Instructions for Playing at the Game of Cricket.
- Cricket was by now feeling the impact of Great Britain's war against the Napoleonic Empire through a loss of investment which drastically reduced the number of matches:
  - 18 May — MCC v Thursday Club @ Lord's Old Ground
  - 24–25 June — England v Surrey @ Lord's Old Ground
  - 6–7 July — W Turner's XI v T Mellish's XI @ Lord's Old Ground
  - 20–21 July — England v Surrey @ Lord's Old Ground
- William Lambert made his debut playing for Surrey against England at Lord's on 20 July. He became "one of the most successful cricketers that has ever yet appeared, excelling as he did in batting, bowling, fielding, keeping wicket, and also single wicket playing".

== Bibliography ==
- ACS (1981). A Guide to Important Cricket Matches Played in the British Isles 1709–1863. Nottingham: ACS. OCLC 85045528.
- Haygarth, Arthur (1996) [1862]. Scores & Biographies, Volume 1 (1744–1826). Kennington: Frederick Lillywhite. ISBN 978-19-00592-23-9.
- Warner, Pelham (1946). Lords: 1787–1945. London: Harrap. OCLC 877106024.
