= 1810 English cricket season =

Cricket season review

The 1810 English cricket season was the 24th since the foundation of Marylebone Cricket Club (MCC). William Ward made his known debut, and The Bs were dismissed for a total of only 6. Details of seven historically important eleven-a-side matches are known. (Note: Any match listed in the ACS' Important Match Guide (1981) is historically important, and therefore of the highest standard, whether or not a scorecard might exist. The same applies to numerous matches discovered by researchers since 1981. For further information, see First-class cricket.)

== Events ==
- The Bs were bowled out for 6 in the second innings of their match against England at Lord's Old Ground on 14 June: the innings contained only three scoring strokes, with E. H. Budd unable to bat due to injury. This total of 6 remains the record for the lowest innings total in important matches.
- The match in August between Captain Blagrave's XI and Colonel Byng's XI is the last known to have been played on Lord's Old Ground.
- An American visitor drew a sharp distinction between cricket as played in England and "our cricket", referring especially to the "old long low wicket" still used in America.
- The impact of the Napoleonic War had been felt by cricket since 1797, when inter-county matches simply ceased, and there had been a steady decline in both number and quality of major matches during the first decade of the 19th century until they became few and far between after 1810. Nevertheless, the impact of this war was less severe than that of the Seven Years' War because of the existence this time of Marylebone Cricket Club (MCC) and other well-organised clubs like Brighton and Montpelier. These clubs managed to co-ordinate cricket activities during the war emergency and, as it were, keep the game going. Only 7 important matches were recorded in 1810:
  - 29–31 May — Lord F Beauclerk's XI v E Bligh's XI @ Lord's Old Ground
  - 12–14 June — England v The Bs @ Lord's Old Ground
  - 19–21 June — England v Surrey @ Lord's Old Ground
  - 2–4 July — Over 38 v Under 38 @ Lord's Old Ground
  - 16–18 July — England v Surrey @ Lord's Old Ground
  - 24–25 July — Over 38 v Under 38 @ Lord's Old Ground
  - 13–15 August — Captain Blagrave's XI v Colonel Byng's XI @ Lord's Old Ground

== Bibliography ==
- ACS (1981). A Guide to Important Cricket Matches Played in the British Isles 1709–1863. Nottingham: ACS. OCLC 85045528.
- Haygarth, Arthur (1996) [1862]. Scores & Biographies, Volume 1 (1744–1826). Kennington: Frederick Lillywhite. ISBN 978-19-00592-23-9.
- Warner, Pelham (1946). Lords: 1787–1945. London: Harrap. OCLC 877106024.
