= The Bs =

19th century English cricket team

The Bs was an English cricket team that played in the first half of the 19th century in occasional matches against England and Marylebone Cricket Club (MCC). The team ostensibly consisted of players whose surname began with the letter B, given that there were several top-class players at the time who qualified. A total of 44 players represented the Bs in twelve matches, all rated historically important, (Note: Any match listed in the ACS' Important Match Guide (1981) is historically important, and therefore of the highest standard, whether or not a scorecard might exist. The same applies to numerous matches discovered by researchers since 1981. For further information, see First-class cricket.) between July 1805 and August 1837. They included Thomas Beagley, Lord Frederick Beauclerk, Billy Beldham, John Bennett, Henry Bentley, Jem Broadbridge, and E. H. Budd. Another was Frederick Hervey-Bathurst, whose surname was half a B. There were three instances of the team including given men. These were James Lawrell in 1810, Roger Kynaston in 1837, and the outstanding all-rounder John Wells, who played for them in both 1805 and 1810.

== Concept ==
In Barclays World of Cricket, A. A. Thomson wrote about the need to form strong XIs in the first half of the 19th century, as there were few good county teams at the time. He recognised The Bs as "bound to be a formidable combination". As he said, there were several top-class players "whose names began with that letter", among them Thomas Beagley, Lord Frederick Beauclerk, Billy Beldham, Jem Broadbridge, and E. H. Budd. Thomson said The Bs were a match for England, as they were on ten occasions from 1805 to 1831—their 1832 and 1837 matches were against MCC.

The controversial Beauclerk was something of a mainstay for The Bs, playing in all their first eight matches between 1805 and 1825. His final appearance in important matches was for the team in July 1825, when England won by 138 runs. Harry Altham recounted how Beauclerk, at the age of 51, scored 99 in the July 1824 game, enabling The Bs to win by 184 runs.

== The Bs v England, June 1810 ==
The Bs achieved unwanted fame in June 1810 when they played England at Lord's Old Ground, and were dismissed for only 6 in their second innings, enabling England to win the match by 6 wickets. This is the world record for the lowest innings total in important/first-class cricket. Four of the six runs were scored by John Wells in one hit, and one more by James Lawrell, these being the two given men as only nine Bs could take part. The only B to score a run was Samuel Bridger.

The Bs had batted first and scored 137, including 41 by Beauclerk which was the top score of the match. England were dismissed for 100, and the Bs had a useful first innings lead of 37. The architect of their second innings disaster was John Hammond, who was involved in at least six dismissals—five bowled and one caught. England therefore needed 44 to win, and struggled at first, but Robert Robinson scored 23* to help them reach their target.

Arthur Haygarth commented on the two given men, saying: "It is presumed that Mr Lawrell played for the Bs because he backed them, certainly not for his excellence as a cricketer, as in the case of Wells".

The ACS said "the exceptionally small total might appear to go against the inclusion of this game in the list of 'important' matches". Having said that, they pointed out the fact that the Bs had several players of high quality, so the match "cannot be dismissed as too weak for inclusion".

== Overall record ==
Despite the 1810 setback, the Bs had a reasonable record. They defeated England in 1805, 1822, 1823, and 1824.

== Bibliography ==
- ACS (1981). A Guide to Important Cricket Matches Played in the British Isles 1709–1863. Nottingham: ACS. OCLC 85045528.
- Altham, H. S.; Swanton, E. W. (1962). A History of Cricket, Volume 1 (to 1914) (5th ed.). London: George Allen & Unwin. OCLC 894274808.
- Barclays (1986). Swanton, E. W.; Plumptre, George; Woodcock, John (eds.). Barclays World of Cricket. London: HarperCollins. ISBN 978-00-02181-93-8.
- Haygarth, Arthur (1996) [1862]. Scores & Biographies, Volume 1 (1744–1826). Kennington: Frederick Lillywhite. ISBN 978-19-00592-23-9.
