= William Lambert (cricketer, born 1779) =

English cricketer (1779–1851)

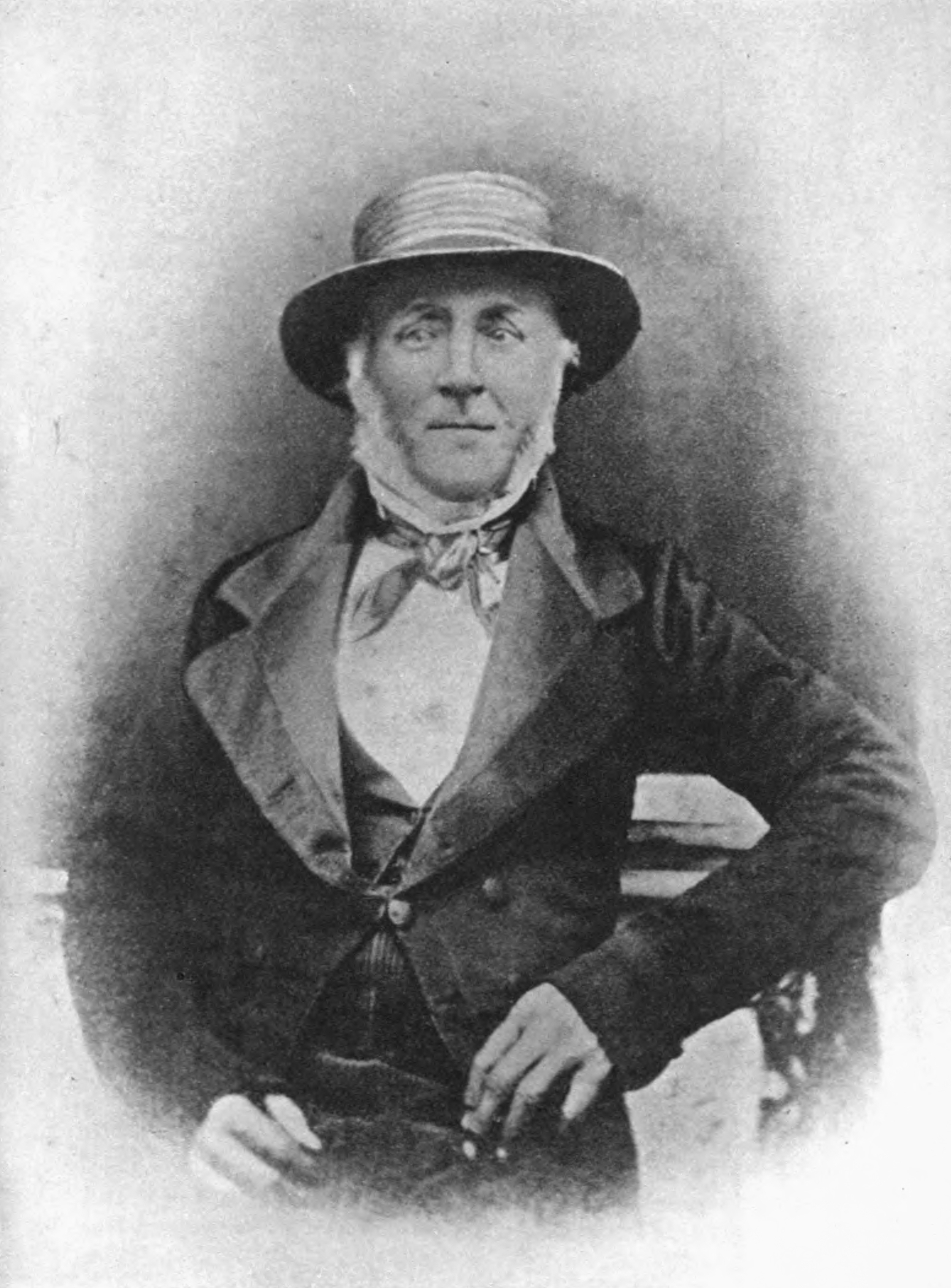
- Lambert in old age

Personal information
- Full name: William Lambert
- Born: 1779; Burstow, Surrey
- Died: 19 April 1851 (aged 71–72); Nutfield, Surrey
- Batting: Right-handed
- Bowling: Right arm slow (underarm)
- Role: All-rounder

Domestic team information
- Years: Team
- 1801–1817: Surrey
- 1804–1817: England
- 1806: Kent
- 1806–1807: Hampshire
- 1807–1816: Marylebone Cricket Club (MCC)
- 1816–1817: Sussex

William Lambert (1779 (christened 14 March 1779) – 19 April 1851) was an English professional cricketer who played for numerous teams between 1801 and 1817. He was born at Burstow in Surrey, and died at Nutfield, Surrey. A right-handed batting all-rounder, he is widely recognised as one of the greatest batters of cricket's underarm era. Using an underarm action, he bowled pitched deliveries at a slow pace (it is not known if he used spin). He generally fielded in close catching positions, mostly at slip and often played as wicket-keeper.

Lambert played mainly for Surrey and was a regular choice for England teams. In the first two Gentlemen v Players matches, he played for the Gentlemen as a given man. In 1817, he scored two centuries in the same match and is the first player known to have achieved this feat. Soon afterwards, he was implicated in a match-fixing scandal and was banned from playing at Lord's by Marylebone Cricket Club. This ended his career in important matches.

== Career ==
Lambert was described by Arthur Haygarth as "one of the most successful cricketers that has ever yet appeared, excelling as he did in batting, bowling, fielding, keeping wicket, and also single wicket playing".

He is first recorded on 20–21 July 1801 when, aged 22, he played for Surrey against England at Lord's Old Ground. The surviving match scorecard lists him tenth in the Surrey batting order. He scored 0 and 5 in Surrey's innings of 109 and 169. England were dismissed for 62 and 68 so Surrey won by 148 runs. Lambert didn't bowl; he held one catch to dismiss John Bennett.

Over the next few years, Lambert's career progressed to the point where, along with Billy Beldham and Lord Frederick Beauclerk, he was generally recognised as one of cricket's most outstanding players. His reputation was underlined in July 1806 when he and Beldham, both professionals, were chosen as given men by the amateur Gentlemen team for the inaugural Gentlemen v Players match. After the all-professional Players were dismissed for 69, Lambert top-scored for the Gentlemen with 57 in a total of 195. The Players were all out for 112 and the Gentlemen won by an innings and 14 runs. Lambert played as their wicket-keeper, holding one catch and completing two stumpings. The second match in the series soon followed and, while Beldham returned to the Players, Lambert was retained as a given man by the Gentlemen. In this match, he batted third, kept wicket and also bowled. The Gentlemen took first innings and were all out for 96, Lambert scoring 2. In the Players' first innings of 65, he held one catch and took at least four wickets, those all bowled. (Note: Early match scorecards were never comprehensive, especially the dismissal information. The scorecards did not record the name of the bowler if the batsman was caught or stumped – only the name of the fielder. The bowler was only credited with the wicket if he bowled the batsman out. In addition, bowling analyses could not be computed as the scorecards lacked balls bowled and runs conceded. In 1836, Marylebone Cricket Club (MCC) agreed to include bowlers' names in scorecards for all dismissals except run out and there was a gradual improvement in the recording of match information.) He scored 43 in the Gentlemen's second innings of 132. Beauclerk scored 38, having made 58 in the first innings. It is not known if Lambert bowled in the Players' second innings but he was certainly the wicket-keeper, completing two stumpings. The Players were all out for 81 and the Gentlemen won by 82 runs.

In July 1817, Lambert scored two centuries (107* and 157) for Sussex against Epsom at Lord's. He is the first player known to have scored two centuries in the same match. Sussex won by the huge margin of 427 runs.

That match turned out to be Lambert's final appearance because he was banned for life soon afterwards following allegations of match-fixing in an earlier Nottingham v England match. Whether the allegations were true or not is unknown. Lambert lived in Reigate and continued to play local club cricket until he was over sixty – his last known match was in 1839.

== Bibliography ==
- Haygarth, Arthur (1996) [1862]. Scores & Biographies, Volume 1 (1744–1826). Kennington: Frederick Lillywhite. ISBN 978-19-00592-23-9.
- Haygarth, Arthur (1997) [1862]. Scores & Biographies, Volume 2 (1827–1840). Kennington: Frederick Lillywhite. ISBN 978-19-00592-23-9.
- Webber, Roy (1951). The Playfair Book of Cricket Records. London: Playfair Books. ASIN B0000CHVVU.
