= George Quentin (cricketer) =

Indian-born English cricketer

George Augustus Frederick Quentin (3 November 1848 – 6 May 1928) was an Indian-born English cricketer. He was a right-handed batsman and a right-arm round-arm bowler who played for Gloucestershire. He was born in Kirkee, became an Anglican priest, and died in St. Leonards-on-Sea.

== Life ==
He was the eldest son of George Augustus Frederick Quentin of the 10th Hussars and Kirkee (son of Sir George Quentin), and his wife Anne Medlycott. Educated at Shrewsbury School, he graduated B.A. at St. John's College, Oxford in 1872. He was ordained in 1877, and became rector of Shipdham in Norfolk in 1884.

== Cricket ==
Quentin made a single first-class appearance for the side, during the 1874 season, against Yorkshire. From the lower-middle order, he scored 22 runs in the only innings in which he batted, becoming one of future England Test cricketer George Ulyett's five wickets.
