= Gentlemen cricket team =

UK cricket team

The Gentlemen appeared in first-class cricket between 1806 and 1962, always in the showcase Gentlemen v Players matches against the Players. Teams called the Gentlemen have played in a few minor matches. In the 18th century, there was an occasional team called the Gentlemen of England.

The inaugural Gentlemen v Players fixture was held at Lord's on 7, 8 and 9 July 1806, the Gentlemen winning by an innings and 14 runs. The fixture was played in most seasons since then, often in two or more instalments, until the last one at North Marine Road, Scarborough on 8, 10 and 11 September 1962, the Players winning by 7 wickets.

The Gentlemen were cricketers with amateur status, who nominally claimed expenses for playing, whereas the Players were paid professionals. The outstanding figure in Gentlemen cricket was W. G. Grace.

== Bibliography ==
- Haygarth, Arthur (1862). Scores & Biographies, Volume 1 (1744–1826). Lillywhite.
- Charles Williams, Gentlemen & Players: The Death of Amateurism in Cricket, Weidenfeld & Nicolson, 2012, ISBN 9780753829271
