= 1816 English cricket season =

Cricket season review

1816 was the 30th season of cricket in England since the foundation of Marylebone Cricket Club (MCC). Manchester Cricket Club was founded and became the forerunner of Lancashire County Cricket Club (founded in 1864). Details of eight historically important eleven-a-side matches are known. (Note: Any match listed in the ACS' Important Match Guide (1981) is historically important, and therefore of the highest standard, whether or not a scorecard might exist. The same applies to numerous matches discovered by researchers since 1981. For further information, see First-class cricket.)

== Events ==
- The 1816 season saw the formation of the Manchester Cricket Club which took part in a number of major matches until Lancashire CCC was established in 1864. Manchester was representative of Lancashire as a county in the same way that Sheffield Cricket Club and Nottingham Cricket Club represented Yorkshire and Nottinghamshire.
- The issue of roundarm bowling was already controversial enough in 1816 for Marylebone Cricket Club (MCC) to amend the Laws of Cricket to prohibit it:

The ball must be bowled (not thrown or jerked), and be delivered underhand, with the hand below the elbow. But if the ball be jerked, or the arm extended from the body horizontally, and any part of the hand be uppermost, or the hand horizontally extended when the ball is delivered, the Umpires shall call "No Ball".

- With cricket recovering from the effects of the Napoleonic War, a total of eight matches were recorded in 1816:
  - 10–11 June — Marylebone Cricket Club (MCC) v Hampshire @ Lord's Cricket Ground
  - 17–19 June — E H Budd's XI v G Osbaldeston's XI @ Lord's Cricket Ground
  - 24–25 June — Marylebone Cricket Club (MCC) v Hampshire @ Lord's Cricket Ground
  - 3–6 July — England v The Bs @ Lord's Cricket Ground
  - 29 July–2 August — Sussex v Epsom @ Lord's Cricket Ground
  - 5–6 August — Gentlemen of England v Old Etonians @ Lord's Cricket Ground
  - 14–16 August — Marylebone Cricket Club (MCC) v Middlesex @ Lord's Cricket Ground
  - 21–23 August — Epsom v Hampshire @ Epsom Down

== Bibliography ==
- ACS (1981). A Guide to Important Cricket Matches Played in the British Isles 1709–1863. Nottingham: ACS. OCLC 85045528.
- Haygarth, Arthur (1996) [1862]. Scores & Biographies, Volume 1 (1744–1826). Kennington: Frederick Lillywhite. ISBN 978-19-00592-23-9.
- Warner, Pelham (1946). Lords: 1787–1945. London: Harrap. OCLC 877106024.
