= Players cricket team =

The Players appeared in first-class cricket between 1806 and 1962, nearly always in the showcase Gentlemen v Players matches against the Gentlemen, though Players teams have occasionally played against touring sides too. Teams called the Players have played in a few minor matches.

The inaugural Gentlemen v Players fixture was held at Lord's on 7, 8 and 9 July 1806, the Gentlemen winning by an innings and 14 runs. The fixture was played in most seasons since then, often in two or more instalments, until the last one at North Marine Road, Scarborough on 8, 10 and 11 September 1962, the Players winning by 7 wickets.

The Players were cricketers with professional status, whereas the Gentlemen were termed amateurs who nominally claimed expenses for playing. Outstanding members of Players teams have included Fuller Pilch, Wilfred Rhodes, Jack Hobbs, Len Hutton and Fred Trueman.

== Bibliography ==
- Haygarth, Arthur (1862). Scores & Biographies, Volume 1 (1744–1826). Lillywhite.
- Charles Williams, Gentlemen & Players: The Death of Amateurism in Cricket, Weidenfeld & Nicolson, 2012, ISBN 9780753829271
