= Eastwick Park =

Former country house in Surrey, England

Coordinates: 51.284°N 0.3698°W

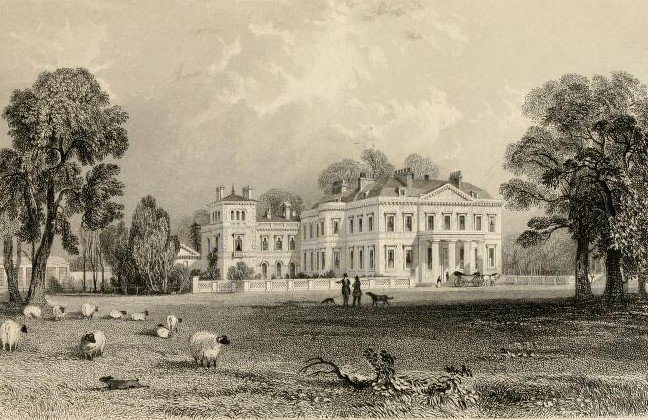
Eastwick Park, mid-19th century when owned by David Barclay

Eastwick Park, also Eastwich Park, at Great Bookham in Surrey, England (for the period 1726–1958) was the family seat of the Howards of Effingham for about seventy years.

== History ==
Eastwick Park was built by the French Huguenot architect Nicholas Dubois (c. 1665–1735) between 1726 and 1728 for Sir Conyers Darcy and his wife, Elizabeth, daughter of John Rotherham of Much Waltham, Essex and the recent widow of Thomas Howard, 6th Lord Howard of Effingham.

=== The Lawrells ===
James Lawrell senior, an engineer of the East India Company who had become a financial official in the Bengal Presidency, settled at Eastwick. He arrived in Bengal in 1758, and left the company's service in 1775. He married in 1776 Catherine Holme Sumner, sister of the politician George Holme-Sumner, whose father William Brightwell Sumner had purchased Hatchlands Park, not far away from Eastwick Park, in 1768. He died in 1799.

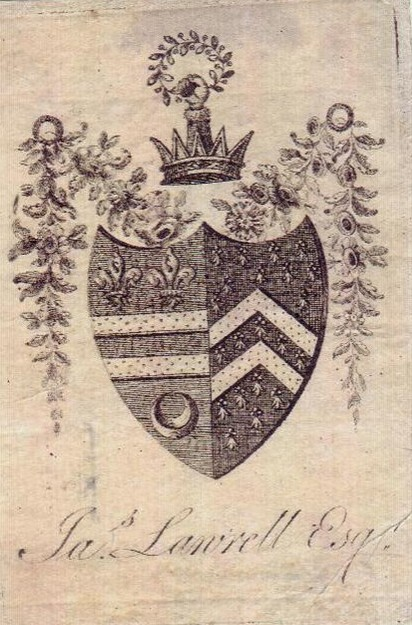
Book plate of James Lawrell (died 1799), impaling the arms of Sumner

Lawrell and his wife were in the Brighton circle of the Prince of Wales in the 1780s, and figure in an anecdote of one of his pranks, circulated by Court Dewes. Their daughter Georgiana Lawrell (born c.1783), who married George Augustus Quentin, became later a major figure of Regency-period gossip. She and a sister moved to London around 1801, as their mother remarried to a husband named Hinchman.

In 1801, Eastwick Park was sold by Richard Howard, the 4th and last Earl of Effingham (of the first creation), to the trustees of James Lawrell junior, the eldest son. He had substantial building work done on the house, in 1806–1807. He sold Eastwick Park in 1809, to Louis Bazalgette.

=== Later owners ===
David Barclay acquired Eastwick Park in 1833, by purchase from the estate of Louis Bazalgette, who died in 1830. The sale followed a chancery case involving Frances Bazalgette, the widow, and Evelyn, son of Louis. Barclay had work done on the house, possibly involving Decimus Burton. He rented it out from 1847, when he was experiencing financial troubles. But his son Hedworth David Barclay occupied it; and after his death it was sold by his son Hedworth Trelawny Barclay, in 1880.

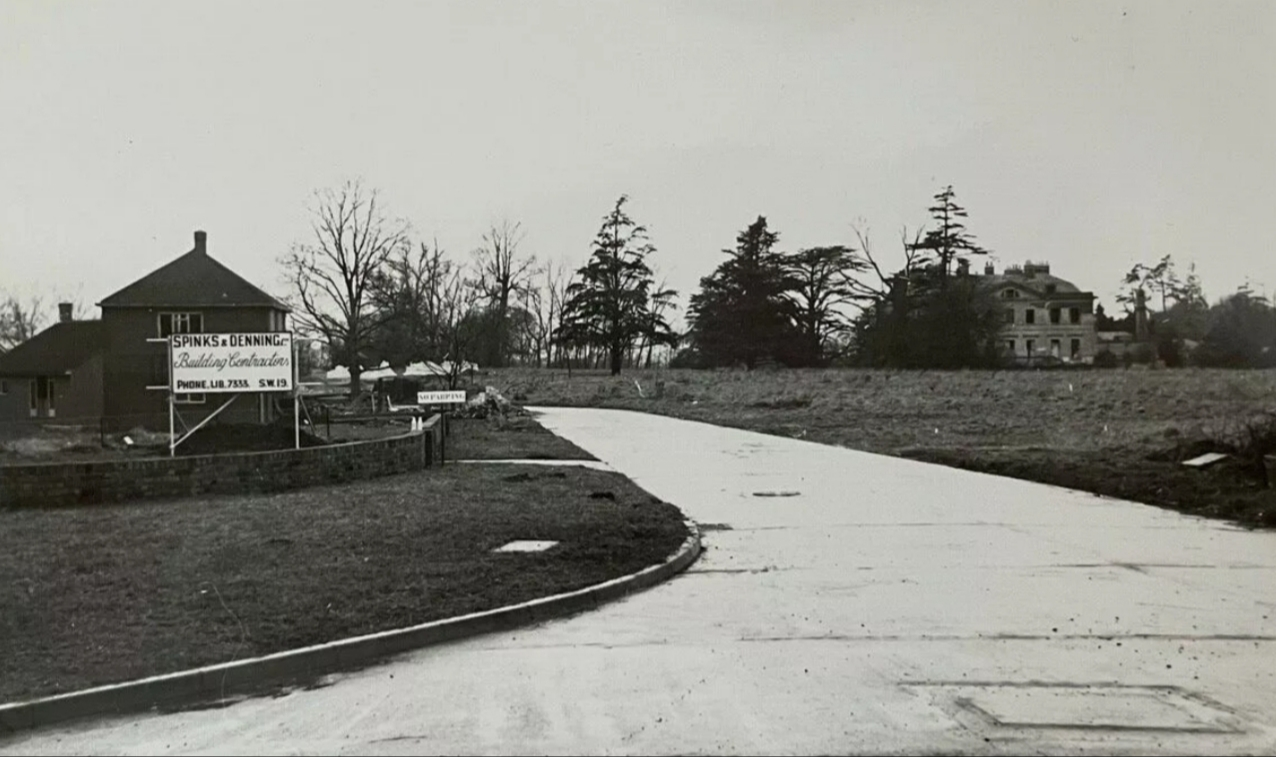
1958 construction of Eastwick Park Avenue, shortly before demolition of Eastwick Park

Eastwick Park housed Southey Hall Boys Preparatory School from 1924 until 1954 (during World War II the boys were evacuated to Devon and Eastwick Park was turned into accommodation for Canadian soldiers). The house was empty from 1954 until 1958 when was demolished to make way for housing and Eastwick County Primary School (which has since been renamed Eastwick Junior School).
