= John Bentley (cricketer) =

English cricketer

John Bentley (1 March 1787 – 26 March 1859) was an English professional cricketer. He was the brother of Henry Bentley.

Bentley was mainly associated with Middlesex and he made 13 known appearances from 1807 to 1817.

== Bibliography ==
- Haygarth, Arthur (1996) [1862]. Scores & Biographies, Volume 1 (1744–1826). Kennington: Frederick Lillywhite. ISBN 978-19-00592-23-9.
- Haygarth, Arthur (1997) [1862]. Scores & Biographies, Volume 2 (1827–1840). Kennington: Frederick Lillywhite. ISBN 978-19-00592-23-9.
