= History of English cricket (1751–1775) =

Development of cricket from 1751 to 1775

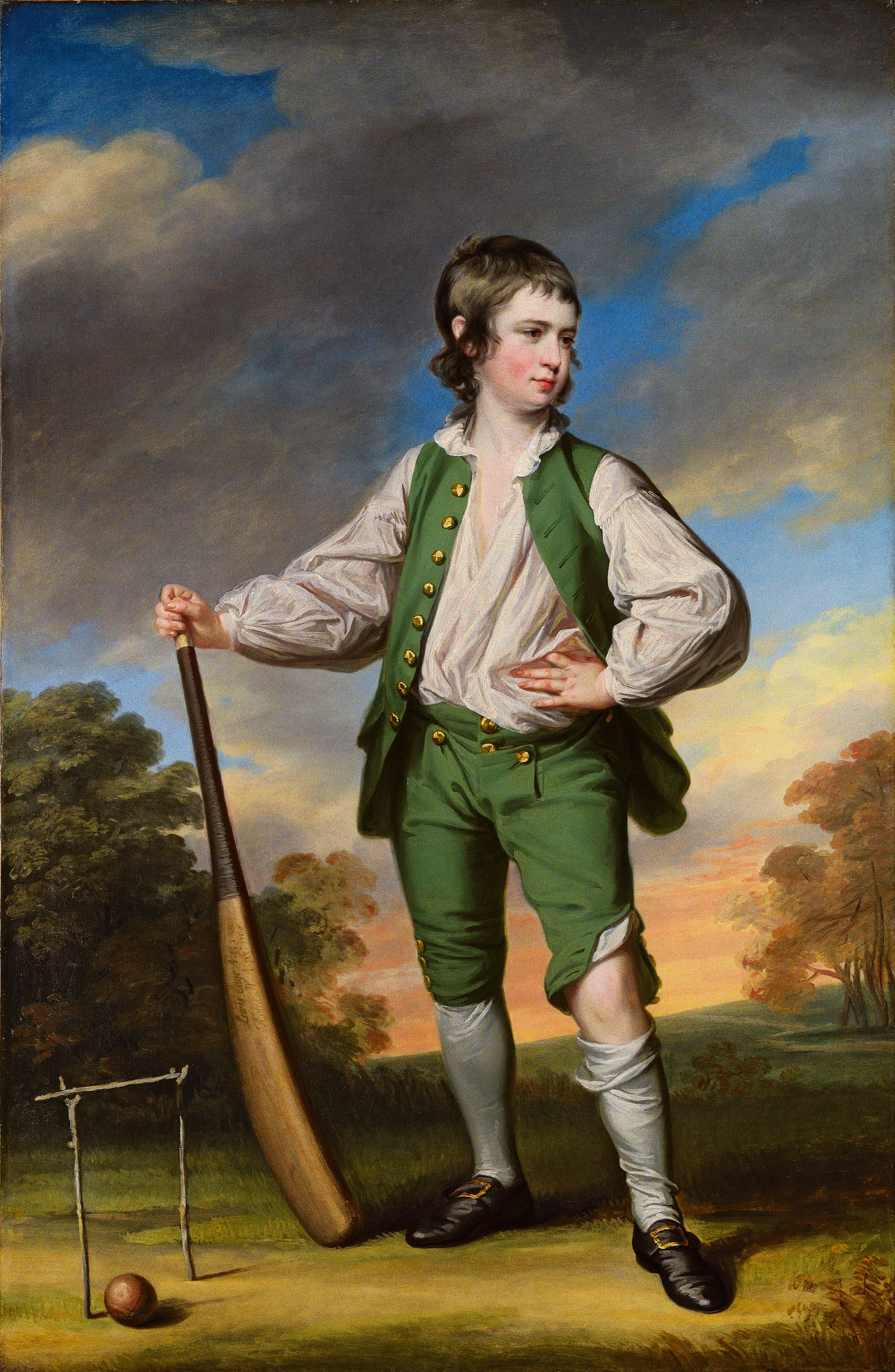
The Young Cricketer, a 1768 Francis Cotes painting depicting Milgate House cricketer Lewis Cage.

In the years from 1751 to 1775, English cricket saw the rise of the Hambledon Club and continued to spread across England. The Laws of Cricket underwent a re-codification in 1775, including the introduction of the leg before wicket rule.

The mid-century deaths of some of the game's leading patrons reduced investment, and the sport seems to have regressed during the period of the Seven Years' War (1756–1763). However, cricket underwent an evolutionary change around 1760 with the introduction of pitched delivery bowling and the consequent invention of the straight bat. Around the same time, the Hambledon Club was founded, and cricket thrived under its leadership for the next 25 years. Cricket continued its spread throughout England with several references in 1751 followed by Derbyshire in 1757, Northumberland in 1766, and Wiltshire in 1769.

== Hambledon ==
Based at Broadhalfpenny Down, near the village of Hambledon in rural Hampshire, the Hambledon Club was a social club with a wide range of activities. It organised county cricket matches and ran the Hampshire county teams of the period.

The origin of the Hambledon Club has not been fully established, but the earliest known mentions of Hambledon and Broadhalfpenny Down are in August 1753, when Hambledon played Surrey and won by 113 runs. In 1756, a team called Hambledon played three matches against Dartford. The source for one of them, played on Broadhalfpenny Down, is a newspaper advert placed by the owner of a missing dog, which was lost at the match.

The 1764 season marked the beginning of the "Hambledon Era", and it is believed to be about this time that the Hambledon Club was founded.

== Pre-war cricket ==
Cricket lost a key supporter when Frederick, Prince of Wales died on 31 March 1751. There were two matches between Kent and England on the Artillery Ground in May 1751. England won the first by nine runs and the second by an innings and nine runs. These seem to have been the last known big matches for many years as there is much less coverage of cricket in the sources after 1751.

The earliest references to cricket in the counties of Durham, Somerset, Warwickshire and Yorkshire all occurred in 1751. There were two matches in Yorkshire: a local game in Sheffield and one patronised by two aristocrats near Richmond.

In August 1755, a player on Kennington Common lost his right eye after being hit by the ball, raising awareness of the dangers in cricket.

== Impact of the Seven Years' War ==
The Seven Years' War (1756–1763) caused economic hardship in England, considerably reducing investment in cricket. As a result, fewer matches were recorded during the war years. There were five in 1756 that all involved Dartford, including three against Hambledon. Dartford played three matches against England in the 1759 season and the names of several participants are known. Dartford won two of the matches; England won one.

In the later years of the war, the number of eleven-a-side matches ranged from none at all in 1760 to eight in 1762. Following records of the game in Sheffield a decade earlier, the earliest mention of cricket in Leeds occurs in a report of a game being played in the Chapeltown area of Leeds on 9 July 1761. Surviving records indicate that the Chertsey club in Surrey was active through the war years. Details of two Middlesex v Surrey games have survived from the 1763 season, which began shortly after the war ended

Following the war, Great Britain expanded its interests in India at the expense of France, ensuring the spread of cricket throughout the sub-continent.

== Post-war cricket ==
Seven eleven-a-side matches between significant teams are known to have taken place in 1764. Chertsey and Hambledon, by then the leading teams in cricket, played each other three times, as did teams called Norfolk and Suffolk. A number of notable players are mentioned in sources for the first time, including three of the greatest 18th-century players: Richard Nyren, John Small and Lumpy Stevens.

Five eleven-a-side matches were recorded in 1765, including two in Yorkshire between the Leeds and Sheffield clubs. One of the three matches in 1766 was between Sussex and Hampshire, which is the earliest reference to Hampshire as an individual county team. The Blecheley Diary of the Rev. William Cole 1765–67 includes a reference to a Fenny-Stratford cricket match in the entry for 30 October 1766, showing the game's presence outside its early strongholds of the southeast counties and London. Seven matches were recorded in 1767, including one between Hampshire and Sussex.

1768 marks the earliest references to patrons John Sackville, 3rd Duke of Dorset, and Sir Horatio Mann in a cricketing context. Reports have survived of eight eleven-a-side matches in the season. In a game between Hampshire and Kent on Broadhalfpenny Down, Hampshire batsman John Small reportedly scored "above seven score notches" (i.e., over 140 runs), but it is not known if it was his match total or his score in Hampshire's second innings. Hampshire totalled 131 and 194 to win the match by 144 runs. A week later, Small scored more than 80 in a match against Sussex.

There were eleven recorded matches in 1769. This was the last season in which the original London Cricket Club and the Artillery Ground featured prominently in the records. Three matches occurred between Kent and London that season, the first in Blackheath and the last two on the Artillery Ground; Kent won the first and third, London the second. In June 1769, Berkshire is first recorded as a county team in a match against Surrey, winning by six runs on Datchet Common. It became a strong centre of the game in the late 18th century, producing numerous players good enough to take part in major matches. A partial score has survived of a game between the Duke of Dorset's XI and Wrotham, played at Sevenoaks Vine in August 1769. John Minshull (aka Minchin) scored 107 for Dorset's XI in the second innings, and this is the earliest century in any class of cricket that has definitely been recorded. On 28 September, Hambledon defeated Surrey by an innings and 41 runs after their opening batsmen, Tom Sueter and George Leer, shared a century partnership of 128 for the first wicket; this was a rare occurrence at the time. In 1769, the Whitehall Evening Post reported that a "great match at Cricket" was to be played at Calais in northern France.

On 29 June 1770, the Middlesex Journal reported the death of a Mr. Johnson, who was a goldsmith at London Wall. His death was "occasioned by a blow which he received from a cricket ball on Thursday, 21 June near Islington". Little is known of the 1770 season, but a combined London and Middlesex played against Surrey at the Artillery Ground in August. In October, Hambledon played Caterham on Broadhalfpenny Down and won by 57 runs.

On 26–27 August 1771, a match occurred on the Forest Racecourse, Nottingham, between the Nottingham and Sheffield clubs. In August 1771, the Hambledon Club played against a team called "All England" but lost by ten wickets. Rowland Bowen, writing in the 1965 edition of Wisden, mentioned the rise of cricket in the industrial cities of Leicester, Nottingham and Sheffield. Apart from London, cricket in this period was elsewhere a rural game. Bowen argued that the trades (hose, lace and cutlery) practised in these cities allowed contract piece work that could be completed in own's home and in one's own time, which enabled workers to play cricket during the day in summer and work at night.

== Scorecards in the 1772 season ==
The first documented match scorecards originate from 1744, but few have been discovered prior to 1772. The scorecards for three 1772 matches have survived, serving as the foundation for cricket's statistical record. (Note: Any match listed in the ACS' Important Match Guide (1981) is historically important, and therefore of the highest standard, whether or not a scorecard might exist. The same applies to numerous matches discovered by researchers since 1981. For further information, see First-class cricket.) The first match in the Cricinfo database was played on 24 June 1772 between Hampshire and England at Broadhalfpenny Down; Hampshire won by 53 runs. The other two games with surviving scorecards were England v Hampshire at Guildford and England v Hampshire at Bishopsbourne in Kent. Hampshire won the Guildford match by 62 runs and England won by two wickets at Bishopsbourne.

These early scorecards only gave scores, with no details of dismissals or bowling. The leading runscorers in the three matches were John Small of Hampshire, who totalled 213 in six innings with a highest score of 78 in the first match, and William Yalden of England, who scored 136 in six innings with a highest of 68 at Guildford.

== See also ==
- History of English cricket (1726–1750)
- History of English cricket (1776–1800)

== Bibliography ==
- ACS (1981). A Guide to Important Cricket Matches Played in the British Isles 1709–1863. Nottingham: ACS. OCLC 85045528.
- Bowen, Rowland (1970). Cricket: A History of its Growth and Development. London: Eyre & Spottiswoode. ISBN 978-04-13278-60-9.
- Buckley, G. B. (1935). Fresh Light on 18th Century Cricket. Birmingham: Cotterell & Co. OCLC 23450280.
- Buckley, G. B. (1937). Fresh Light on pre-Victorian Cricket. Birmingham: Cotterell & Co. OCLC 23469107.
- Maun, Ian (2009). From Commons to Lord's, Volume One: 1700 to 1750. Cambridge: Roger Heavens. ISBN 978-19-00592-52-9.
- Waghorn, H. T. (2005) [1906]. The Dawn of Cricket. London: J. W. McKenzie. ISBN 978-09-47821-17-3.
