= Charles Hammond (English cricketer) =

English cricketer

Personal information
- Full name: Charles James Hammond
- Born: 6 September 1818; Storrington, Sussex, England
- Died: 20 July 1901 (aged 82); Rackham, Sussex, England
- Batting: Right-handed
- Relatives: John Hammond (father); Ernest Hammond (nephew)

Domestic team information
- Years: Team
- 1841–1854: Sussex

Career statistics
| Competition | First-class |
|---|---|
| Matches | 49 |
| Runs scored | 1,045 |
| Batting average | 12.90 |
| 100s/50s | 0/3 |
| Top score | 92 |
| Balls bowled | 72 |
| Wickets | 2 |
| Bowling average | ? |
| 5 wickets in innings | 0 |
| 10 wickets in match | 0 |
| Best bowling | 2/? |
| Catches/stumpings | 19/– |
- Source: Cricinfo, 16 July 2012

Charles James Hammond (6 September 1818 – 20 July 1901) was an English cricketer. Hammond was a right-handed batsman, although his bowling style is unknown. He was born at Storrington, Sussex.

Hammond made his first-class debut for Sussex against Kent in 1841 at the Royal New Ground, Brighton. He played first-class cricket for Sussex in a thirteen-year career, making a total of forty appearances, the last of which came against a United South of England Eleven in 1859. In his forty matches, he scored a total of 932 runs at an average of 13.91, with a high score of 92. One of three half centuries he made, this score came against Nottinghamshire at Trent Bridge in 1843, an innings which helped secure Sussex a draw. His early appearances for the county were met with success, however, according to Scores and Biographies, "After 1849, however, he seldom was engaged in a match, owing to (at least the compiler was so informed) his being a bad field, but could throw in well at the distance of 70 or 80 yards." The same publication noted of his batting that he "was a fine and powerful hitter". In addition to play first-class cricket for Sussex, he also appeared for a number of other teams in first-class cricket. In 1842, he played one match for the Slow Bowlers against the Fast Bowlers at Lord's, indicating that he was perhaps a slow bowler of some sort. In 1844, he appeared once for Petworth against the Marylebone Cricket Club, as well as once for the Married players against the Single players. The following season he appeared three times for Petworth, making two appearances against the Marylebone Cricket Club and one against Hampshire. In that same season he appeared once for the Players in the Gentlemen v Players fixture. He also made a single appearance for England against Kent in 1845, while in 1846 he played in a repeat of that same fixture.

Besides playing cricket, he also stood as an umpire in four first-class matches from 1849 to 1864. He died at Rackham, Sussex, on 20 July 1901. His father, John Hammond, was a prominent first-class cricketer of the late 18th and early 19th centuries, while his nephew, Ernest Hammond, also played first-class cricket.
