= Ernest Hammond =

English cricketer

Personal information
- Born: 29 July 1850; Storrington, Sussex, England
- Died: 31 July 1921 (aged 71); Storrington, Sussex, England
- Batting: Right-handed
- Bowling: Roundarm right-arm slow
- Relatives: John Hammond (grandfather); Charles Hammond (uncle)

Domestic team information
- Years: Team
- 1870–1875: Sussex

Career statistics
Competition	First-class
Matches	5
Runs scored	16
Batting average	2.28
100s/50s	0/0
Top score	5
Catches/stumpings	2/–
- Source: Cricinfo, 13 December 2011

Ernest Hammond (29 July 1850 – 31 July 1921) was an English cricketer. Hammond was a right-handed batsman who bowled roundarm right-arm slow. He was born at Storrington, Sussex.

Hammond made his first-class debut for Sussex against Surrey at The Oval in 1874. He made four further first-class appearances for Sussex, the last of which came against Hampshire in 1875. He struggled in his five first-class matches, scoring just 16 runs at an average of 2.28, with a high score of 5.

He died at the village of his birth on 31 July 1921. His grandfather John Hammond and uncle Charles Hammond both played first-class cricket.
