= Hertfordshire county cricket team (pre-1876) =

Historical English cricket team

Cricket must have reached Hertfordshire by the end of the 17th century. The earliest reference to cricket in the county is dated 1732 and is also the earliest reference to Essex as a county team. On Thursday, 6 July 1732, a team called Essex & Hertfordshire played London Cricket Club in a match at Epping Forest 'for £50 a side'. The result is unknown.

Hertfordshire has never had a major county team, but they did appear frequently throughout the 18th century. There was a county organisation of sorts in 1838 and the present Hertfordshire County Cricket Club was founded on 8 March 1876. It joined the Minor Counties Championship for the first season, 1895, and is the only one of the seven competing teams from that season to have maintained membership continuously ever since.

== Bibliography ==
- ACS (1981). A Guide to Important Cricket Matches Played in the British Isles 1709–1863. Nottingham: ACS. OCLC 85045528.
- Barclays (1986). Swanton, E. W.; Plumptre, George; Woodcock, John (eds.). Barclays World of Cricket. London: HarperCollins. ISBN 978-00-02181-93-8.
- Buckley, G. B. (1935). Fresh Light on 18th Century Cricket. Birmingham: Cotterell & Co. OCLC 23450280.
