= Joseph Grego =

Joseph Grego (23 September 1843 – 24 January 1908) was an art collector and exhibitor, author and journalist, inventor and graphics expert.

== Family origins and company directorships ==
He was born in 1843, at 23 Granville Square, Clerkenwell, London, the elder son of Joseph Grego (1817–1881) and his wife Louisa Emelia Dawley. His grandfather, Antonio Grego, a native of Como in Italy, settled in London before 1821 as a looking-glass manufacturer, the firm becoming Susan Grego and Sons in 1839, and Charles & Joseph Grego in 1845. Joseph Grego invented the 'Colour Photo-Copier', a system of reproducing 18th-century colour prints in such exact facsimile that they have often been mistaken for originals. He was also Director of photo-engravers Carl Hentschel Ltd, 1899–1908. [1896 Patent: No 2013: “Improvements in the Production of Zink or other Metal Blocks for Printing Purposes.”] Grego was also a Director and substantial shareholder of Kegan Paul & Co. from 1903 and The Graphic Company, until his death.

== Writer and editor ==
After a private education, Grego worked briefly at Lloyd's, the underwriters. As an art journalist and author, he specialised as a writer and collector in the works of James Gillray, Thomas Rowlandson, George Morland, Charles Dickens and George Cruikshank, and was an acknowledged authority on all of them. Chiefly responsible for the edition of James Gillray's works (1873), and editing 'Rowlandson the Caricaturist' (1880), both cited as standard books of reference. He collected much material for a life of Morland, which he did not complete. In 1903, he published 'Cruickshank's Water Colours' with reproductions in colour (published by A.&C. Black, London, MCMIII (on the title page), on the verso of the title page, mentioned Published November 1903). In 1874, he compiled a volume of 'Thackerayana;' (600 sketches) (1875 suppressed – reissued 1898).

Grego also edited Pear's Pictorial (1893–1906), wrote 'History of Parliamentary Elections in the Old days, from the time of the Stuarts to Victoria' (1886 & 1892) and edited Gronow's Reminiscences with repro-prints (1889); Vuilliers 'History of Dancing' (1898) 'Pictorial Pickwickiana: Charles Dickens and his illustrators' (1899) and Goldsmith's 'Vicar of Wakefield', including Forster's essay on the story (1903.).

== Collector and exhibitor ==
Inheriting the spirit of collecting from his father, as an Art dealer, Grego always lent his prints and drawings for public exhibitions, occupying most of his time organising such, chiefly of 'English Humorists in Art.' English Humourists in Art Exhibition; Royal Institute; Piccadilly; 1889. Nottingham Castle Exhibition; also publishing an illustrated souvenir with historical notes for the Royal Naval Exhibition in 1891. From 1897 to 1899, Joseph Grego was secretary of the 'Kernoozer's Club';

== Victorian Era Exhibition 1897 ==
Joseph Grego was also a named member of the Honorary Sub-Committee, as an organiser and contributor to the Historical and Commemorative Section; Charles Dickens Memorials; Art and Letters; for the Victorian Era Exhibition. Earls Court 1897. Opened by HRH The Duke of Cambridge, 24 May 1897. This section of the exhibition depicted relics, autographs, paintings, and drawings illustrating novels by Dickens, and also a selection of works by the great Pictorial Humorists of the Victorian Era, &c. The exhibition began with items (58–71), (NB: 1–57 not listed/exhibited), with a series of drawings by Charles Green, RI, illustrating eight of the Dickens works, followed by further (C Green) works lent by Joseph Grego &c &c. This Art Gallery is listed (58–325), concluding with the Dickens Memorial Room, listing items (325a – 325h). Both sections were exhibited in the West-wing of the Earls Court venue.
1897: Victorian Era Exhibition, foreword: “The history of Pickwick – The section undertaken by Mr. Joseph Grego is the fullest collection of Dickensiana ever gathered into one focus. There are (268) illustrations of his works by his contemporaries, some unique and even unpublished*."

ART AND LETTERS ROOM: THE CHARLES DICKENS MEMORIAL,

(Between Historical and Naval Corridor and Military rooms.)

CASE – DICKENS MEMORIALS

- 325A. Silver Two-Handled Loving Cup, with Stand. Presented to Charles Dickens from the Philosophical Institution, Edinburgh. 26 March 1858.
- 325B. Pair of Silver and Tortoise-Shell Ashtrays. A Memento presented by Benjamin Disraeli, (afterwards Earl of Beaconsfield.) to Charles Dickens. Gadshill, 16 November 1852. Lent by James Orrock, Esq RI.
- 325C. DISPATCH BOX used by Charles Dickens on his last visit and reading tour to America. With a leather cover of the same. Some of the adventures of this Dispatch Box are related by Dickens. See Life of Charles Dickens by John Forster. Lent by J Ashby Sterry, Esq.
- 325D. WRITING DESK of Thomas Hood The humourist, (1789–1845). Authenticating Documents in possession of the exhibitor. The Desk was given by Mrs. Hood to the late Thomas Reseigh, and was inherited by the present owner. Lent by James Martin, Esq.
- 325E. COLLECTION OF AUTOGRAPH LETTERS OF:- Charles Dickens, Douglas Jerrold, Thomas Carlyle, Cardinal Manning, Cruickshank, Wilkie Collins, Tennyson, Thackeray, Darwin, Thomas Hood, &c., &c. Lent by Maitland Coffin.
- 325F. TWO AUTOGRAPH LETTERS. The last letter written by the Duke of Wellington. Letter from Thomas Hood to Landseer. Lent by Algernon Graves, Esq., F.S.A.

CARLYLE RELIC

- 325G. WRITING TABLE, formerly the Property of Thomas Carlyle, bequeathed by him to Sir James Fitzjames Stephen, Bart., K.C.S.I. Lent by Sir Herbert Stephen, Bart.
- 325H. H.R.H. THE PRINCE OF WALES (Bronze Statuette). Lent by M.H. Spielman, Esq.

VEE 1897. Commemorative Medal

A memorial Medal (50mm) was struck in the Exhibition by Spink & Son, London, commemorating the Victorian Era Exhibition of 1897, held at Earls Court. The front of the coin has a raised image of Queen Victoria with the surrounding writing Victoria D: G: Britt: Regina F: D: Ind: Imp in commemor an reg sexagesimi MDCCCXCVII. The back of the coin carries the wording Victorian Era Exhibition, opened by HRH The Duke of Cambridge, 24 May 1897.

See also
"A Pictorial Reminiscence of a Visit to the Victorian Era Exhibition, Earl's Court 1897", an 18-page illustrated booklet issued by Fownes' Gloves.

== Kernoozer's Club ==
From 1897 to 1899 Joseph Grego was secretary of the Kernoozer's Club; (motto: Nostrum de armis quaerere,) a close and select little body of connoisseurs in Arms and Armour (“the armour-club par excellence in the world”) formed to promote ‘friendly intercourse between Gentlemen to study, collect and exhibit Ancient Armour and Arms.’ The words kernoozer or kernoozling are late 19th-century humorous travesties on connoisseur. Its sense now extended to form a verb; I kernooze, he kernoozes, I/he should kernoozle.

The Kernoozers Club was founded in 1881 by its first president; Charles Alexander, Baron de Cosson, (from a family of French Revolution emigres), born in Durham on 28 August 1846. Vice-president was Robert Alexander Hillingford, (1825–1904) with Joseph Grego as its Secretary. It was limited to 20 members, whose meetings were held at members' homes. Members are known to include Sir Richard Burton; Egerton Castle; Sir Walter Pollock; John Camden Hotten; Arthur Charles Fox-Davies; John Forster; and Edward McDermott.

A Kernoozers Club meeting was featured in the Magazine of Art (1889; Cassell & Co,) also referred to as "a club of armour virtuosi," by The New York Times; Identical arm and armour societies were supposedly forming in Madrid and Paris about that time emulating the Kernoozers, which folded in 1922 (Sirelmann, p. 363). In 1890, the Junior Kernoozers Club was founded. This club, later becoming the Meyrick Society, whose collections of armour now form the bulk of the Wallace Collection in London.

== Reviews ==
1897: VEE: “The history of Pickwick – The section undertaken by Mr. Joseph Grego is the fullest collection of Dickensiana ever gathered into one focus. There are illustrations of his works by his contemporaries, some unique and even unpublished*."

1899: "Pictorial Pickwickiana:” Unique. Being literary and artistic treasures unlikely to come onto the market – their value... inestimable – examples beyond price – unequalled in interest from a literary/historical point of view – scarce, costly and difficult to procure and impossible for an individual to secure a collection of...

== Death ==
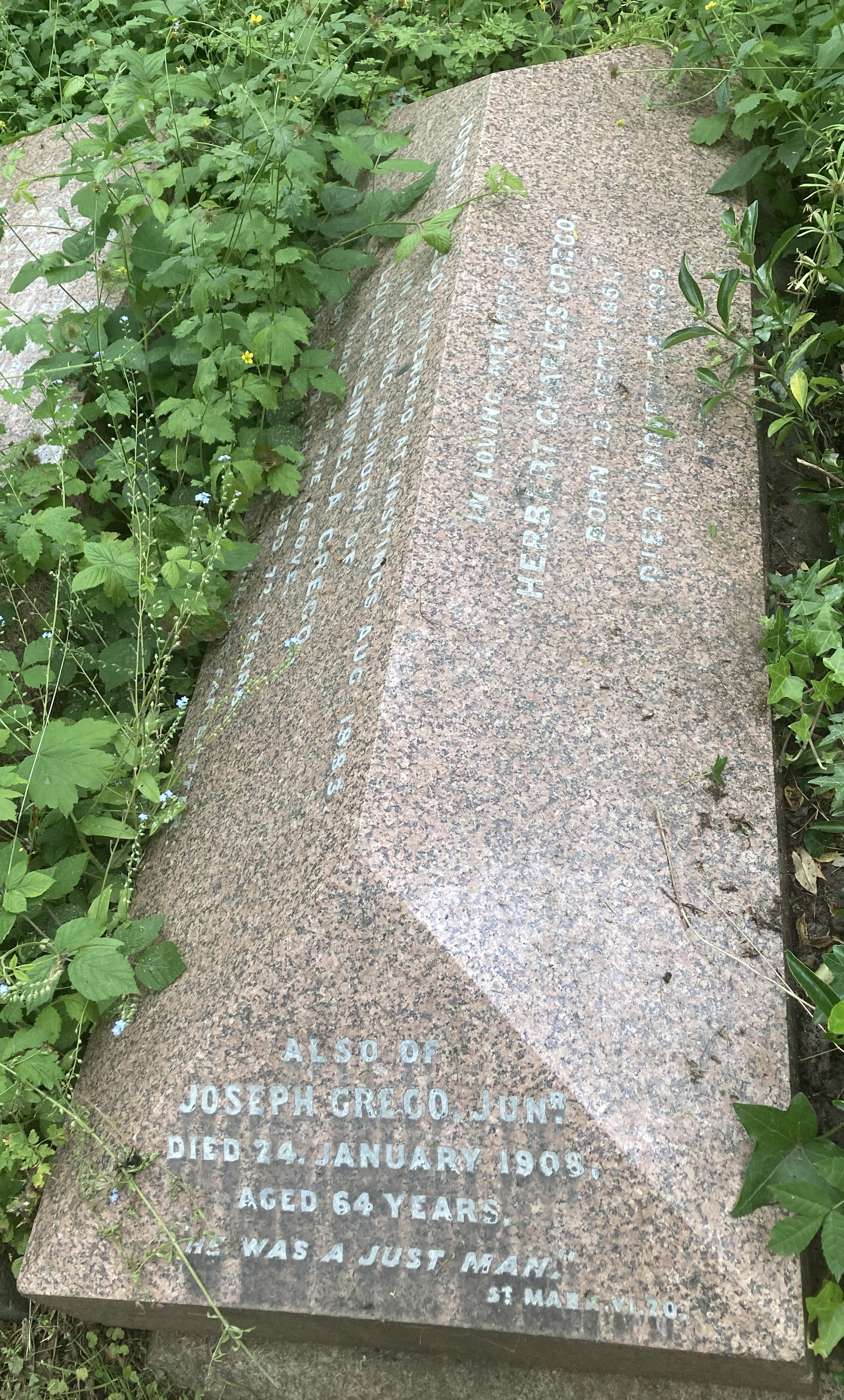
Grave of Joseph Grego in Highgate Cemetery

Joseph Grego died unmarried on 24 January 1908, at the address where he was born and spent most of his life. He was buried in a family grave on the eastern side of Highgate Cemetery.

== British Library and estate auctions ==
His vast accumulations of prints, drawings, and books &c, were dispersed on his death at Christie's (April to June 1908) and Puttick and Simpson (April, June, July 1908.)

There are 28 indexed files of Grego's submissions in the British Library. Although Grego was involved with photographic techniques throughout his life, with the exception of 87 19th century glass-negatives of Pickwickiana* in his estate, withheld from the 1897 VEE, there are no other surviving Grego-photographic records. Albeit there are receipts for 'Photogravure plates produced by Joseph Grego for use by 'Chapman and Hall'- Dickens's publishers, and a rare life-photograph* of Hablot Knight Browne ('Phiz'). Jules Bastien-Lepage drew a small head of Grego in pen and ink on a visit to London, circa 1880–81.

== Obituaries ==
The Times, 28 Jan; Athenaeum, 2 Feb; Graphic 1 February 1908; (With portrait from a photo.)

== Research notes ==
- Robert Seymour (illustrator)
