= James Jordan (cricketer) =

English cricketer (1793–1866)

Personal information
- Born: 21 June 1793; Chatham, Kent
- Died: 10 September 1866 (aged 73); Chatham, Kent
- Role: Batsman

Domestic team information
- Years: Team
- 1822–1823: Kent

James Jordan (21 June 1793 – 10 September 1866) was an English cricketer who played from 1822 to 1824.

== Early life ==
Jordan was born at Chatham in Kent in 1793. He worked as a ropemaker in Chatham Dockyard and was a publican, keeping the Black Lion public house on the Chatham Lines for a period.

== Career ==
Jordan played for Gillingham Cricket Club from at least 1816, appearing in the same year for East Kent and Sussex against West Kent and Surrey. Although few scorecards survive from club matches in this period, he is thought to have been a prolific batsman.

Described as an aggressive batsman who was "quick on his feet" and willing to play shots, Jordan made his debut for the Players in the 1822 Gentlemen v Players match at Lord's. He was the top-scoring batsman for his team, making 38 runs in the first innings and 33 in the second, before going on to play for Kent against Marylebone Cricket Club (MCC) at the same ground the following week, again top scoring, this time with 86. He made two further appearances in 1822, scoring 56 for Kent against MCC in the return match at Chislehurst before making 94 for an England at Lord's.

In 1823, Jordan scored a century for Gillingham against Leeds in a minor match before repeating the feat for Kent, scoring 109 against MCC at Chislehurst. This is the first century scored for Kent in important matches. He had already played for Kent against MCC and for the Players at Lord's during the season, but the match in which he scored his century was his last for a Kent team. The following season he played again for an England team, again at Lord's and made his final appearance for the Players.

== Later life ==
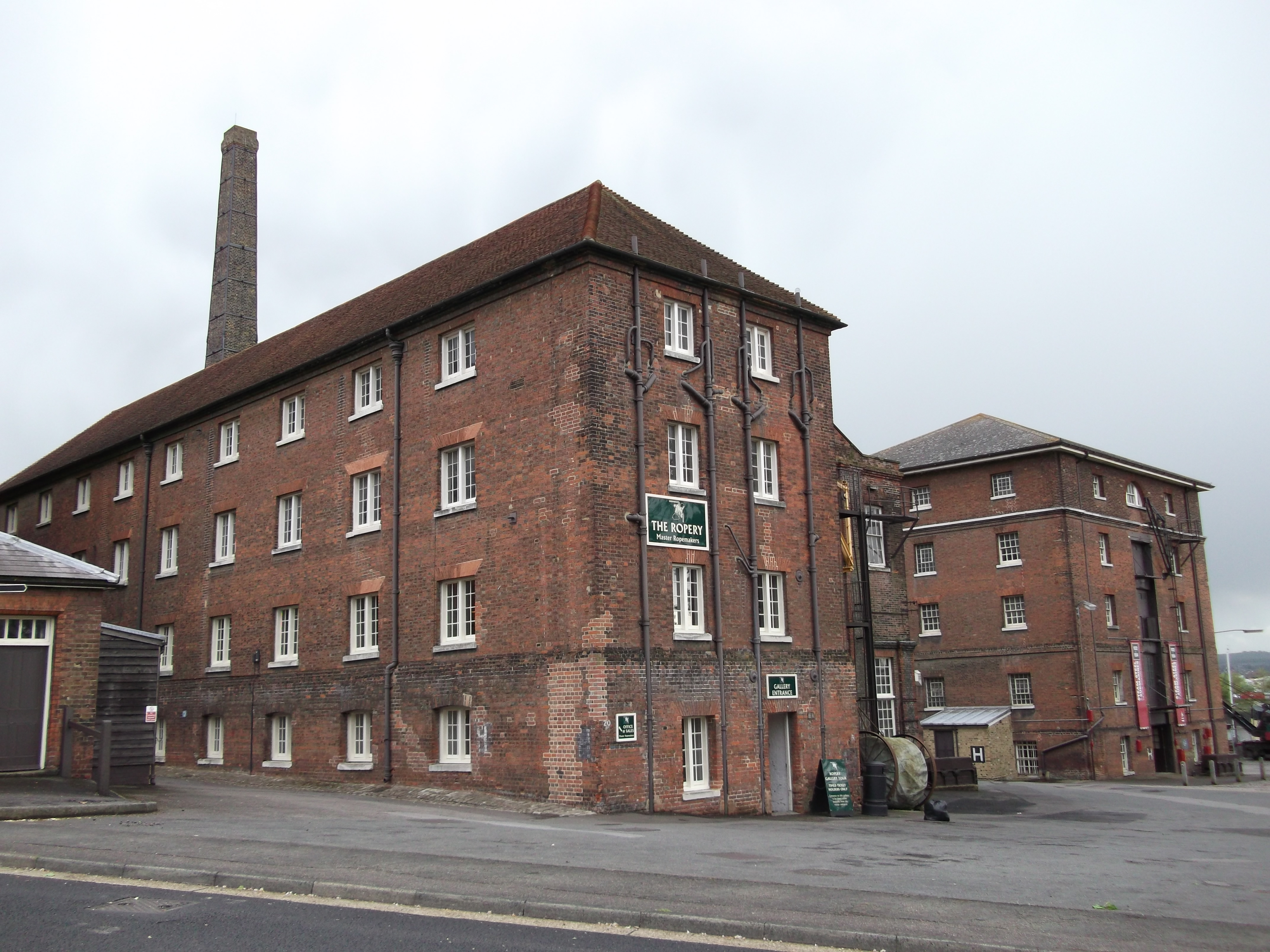
The ropery at Chatham where Jordan worked,

The reasons for Jordan's absence from cricket after 1824 are unknown. In Scores and Biographies, Arthur Haygarth suggests that he may have been unwell, but he played four matches for the Players of Kent against the Gentlemen of Kent between 1826 and 1828. Haygarth also describes him in 1853―aged 60―as "a hearty, active man, still enjoying the sport of shooting and taking much exercise on foot", and The Sporting Magazine suggested that he may have lost form, and that his aggressive style of play may have made him likely to be out caught or stumped.

Carlaw included a quote stating, "[his] manner was not liked by some of the aristocratic patrons of the sport", which may have alienated him from the amateurs who selected teams at the time. He played for Gillingham as late as 1833.

== Personal life ==
Jordan married Elizabeth Featherstone at Frindsbury in 1822. He received a dockyard pension, but was still working in the ropery at Chatham at the 1861 census. He died at Chatham in 1866 aged 73.

== Bibliography ==
- Carlaw, Derek (2020). Kent County Cricketers, A to Z: Part One (1806–1914) (PDF). Cardiff: ACS.
