= James Lawrell =

English cricketer

James Lawrell (1780 at Frimley, Surrey – 1842 in England) was an English amateur cricketer who made 21 known appearances in important matches from 1800 to 1810.

== Background and Eastwick Park ==
He was the son of James Lawrell (or Laurell), who had married in 1776 Catherine Sumner, daughter of William Brightwell Sumner and sister of the politician George Holme-Sumner. His father was an East India Company official in the Bengal Presidency. In 1801, James Lawrell senior having died, in 1799, Eastwick Park was sold by the family of the Earls of Effingham to the trustees of James Lawrell junior, still at that time a minor.

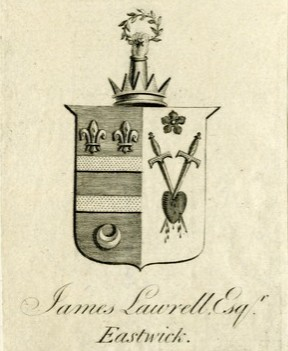
Bookplate of James Lawrell

Lawrell had major building work done on the house, in 1806–1807. At this period he sold the estate and mansion attached to his father's other Surrey property, Frimley Park some way to the west, but retained the house Frimley Manor. He sold Eastwick Park in 1809, to Louis Bazalgette. Bazalgette, at one time tailor to the Prince of Wales, was a successful money-lender and financier.

"James Lawrell Esq. of Eastwick" occurs in William Carew Hazlitt's list of bibliophiles and manuscript collectors. Lawrell's library was put up for auction by Sotheby's long after his death, in 1860.

== Education ==
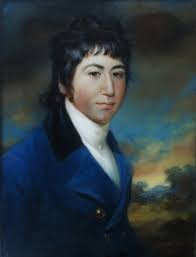
James Lawrell at Eton

Lawrell was educated at Eton College. While at Eton, he was one of the Eton XI flogged in 1796 for taking part in a forbidden cricket match: it was against Westminster School, on Hounslow Heath. He matriculated at Christ Church, Oxford in 1800.

== Cricket ==
Lawrell was a member of Marylebone Cricket Club (MCC). Frimley had a cricket club from the 1820s. Lawrell was a sponsor of the Surrey county team, and played for them. He employed Robert Robinson, a Hambledon Club cricketer known as "Long Bob", as a gamekeeper.

== Family ==
Lawrell married in 1802 Maria Anne Parsons, who was the only surviving child of John Parsons. She died in 1840.

- The eldest son James George Bathoe Lawrell (c.1805–1878) was a student at Haileybury College, and was an East India Company employee, resigning in 1843. His widow Caroline Margaret died in 1879. Their only daughter Catherine Maria married in 1852 Henry Raymond-Barker. Their only son Charles James Pakenham Lawrell married in 1876 Emma Caroline West Hand, third daughter of Thomas Hand.
- The second son Horatio was expelled from Haileybury. He changed his surname to Bebb, in 1850, in order to benefit from the will of John Bebb of the East India Company.
- The fifth son John Lawrell was a cleric. He married in 1841 Harriet Blunt, daughter of Edward Walter Blunt of Kempshott Park, Hampshire.
- The eldest daughter Maria Anne (died 1861, aged 53) married in 1857 G. R. T. "Rufus" Disney, a naval officer.
- Catherine Louisa, the second daughter, married in 1844 Charles Bell.

== External sources ==
- CricketArchive record
