= Henry Raymond-Barker =

English cricketer and lawyer

Henry Barnardiston Raymond-Barker (21 December 1821 – 29 December 1894) was an English lawyer and a cricketer who played in first-class cricket matches for Cambridge University and the Marylebone Cricket Club (MCC) in the 1840s. He was born in London and died at Ealing, then in Middlesex.

Raymond-Barker was educated at Winchester College and at Gonville and Caius College, Cambridge. He played cricket for Winchester as a middle-order batsman and a bowler, though it is not known if he was right- or left-handed or what style of bowling he practised. At Cambridge and for the MCC, he appears not to have bowled, though full scorecards are not available for most of his matches. He appeared in three matches for Cambridge, including the University Match of 1844 against Oxford University, in which he scored eight runs in his only innings, the second highest score for the Cambridge team. Although he played as a batsman, his highest innings in eight first-class games was only 14.

Raymond-Barker graduated from Cambridge University in 1844 with a Bachelor of Arts degree. He was admitted to the Inner Temple in the same year and was called to the bar in 1849.
