= George Augustus Quentin =

British army officer (1760–1851)

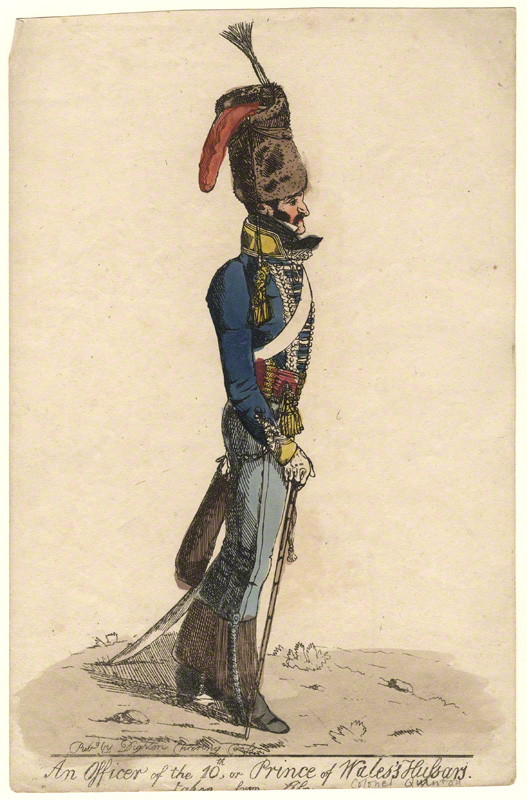
1800 portrait of Quentin by Denis Dighton

Lieutenant-General Sir George Augustus Quentin, CB KCH (1760 – 7 December 1851) was a British army officer who served in the Napoleonic Wars.

== Biography ==
George Quentin was born in 1760, and was the eldest son of George Quentin of Göttingen.

Quentin served seven years in the Hanoverian Garde du Corps, prior to entering the British Army. He was appointed cornet in the 10th Light Dragoons in 1793. Subsequent promotions followed to lieutenant (1 October 1794); captain (17 May 1796); major (14 February 1805) and Lieutenant-Colonel on 13 October 1808. He served in the Peninsular War under Sir John Moore from 11 November 1808 to 16 June 1809, at the battles of Benavente and Corunna; also in Spain, under the Duke of Wellington, in 1813 and 1814, where he received a gold medal and one clasp for his conduct in command of the 10th Hussars at the battles of Orthes and the Toulouse. He received the brevet rank of Colonel on 4 June 1814 and in 1815 served under Wellington in Flanders, and at Waterloo, where he was severely wounded. He was promoted to lieutenant-general in 1838.

At Waterloo in 1815 he was badly wounded, and created Companion of the Order of the Bath (CB) later that year. He was created Knight Commander of the Royal Guelphic Order in 1821. He was aide-de-camp to the Prince Regent from 1811 to 1825, when he was appointed Equerry to the Crown Stables. He died on 7 December 1851, aged 91.

== Court Martial ==
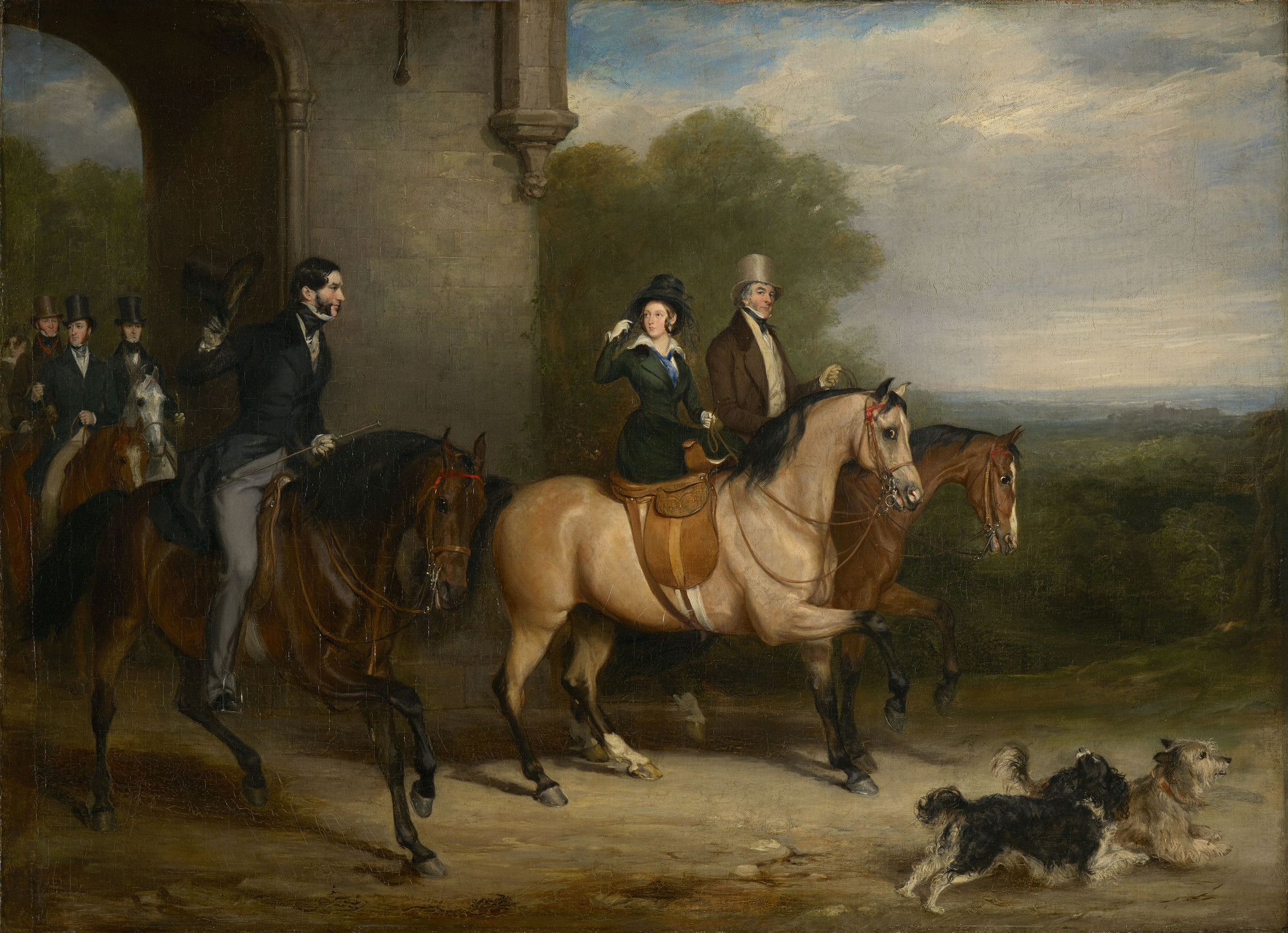
Queen Victoria Riding Out by Francis Grant. Quentin is shown riding on the left of the painting

On 17 October 1814, Quentin was court-martialed on multiple counts of dereliction of duty during the Peninsular War. At the trial it became apparent that the charges had been invented by the officers of his regiment in retaliation for Quentin's attempt to impose discipline on the "aristocratic rabble" under his command. The trial lasted two weeks at the end of which the court decided that Quentin should "be reprimanded in such manner as his Royal Highness the Commander in Chief shall be pleased to direct."

== Family ==
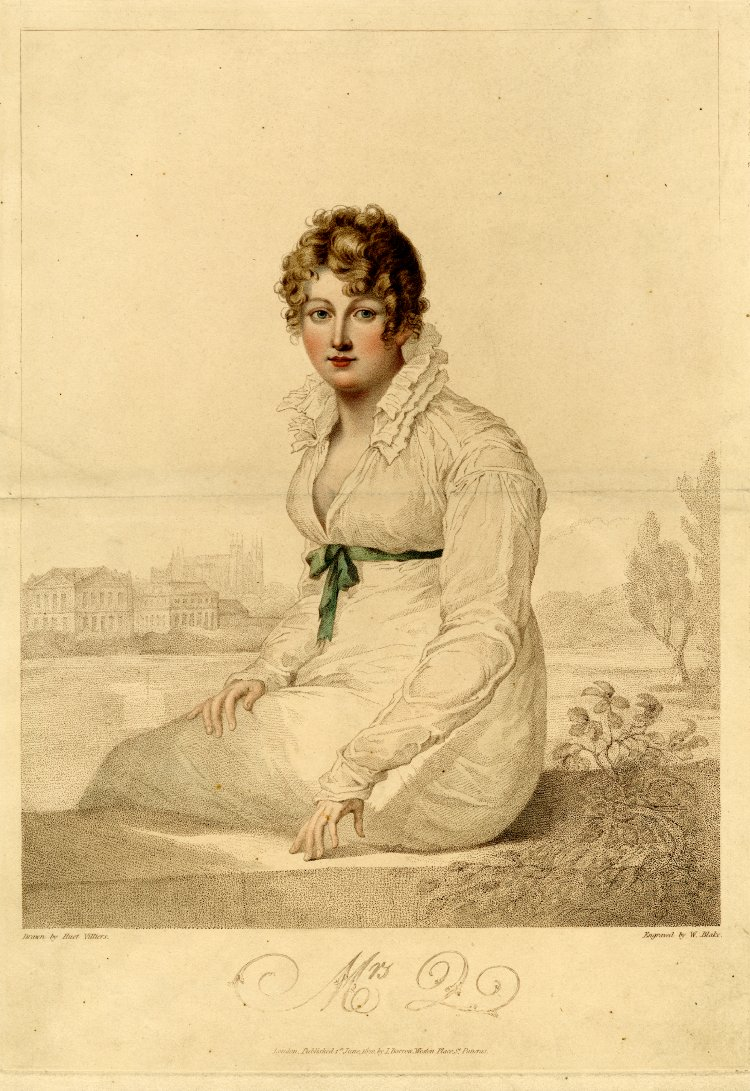
Engraving from 1820 by William Blake of "Mrs Q", Georgiana Quentin

In 1811, Quentin married Georgiana (died 1853), the youngest daughter of James Lawrell of Eastwick Park, and of Frimley Park, Surrey. She was reputedly unfaithful to her husband, and became celebrated as a royal mistress, under the names "Mrs Quentin" or "Harriet Quentin" (a misnomer). In 1822, a pamphlet appeared, Memoirs of the Celebrated Mrs Q—– by "Edward Eglantine", a pseudonym of William Benbow. It was reprinted in 1906 in Mrs Q—— and "Windsor Castle", with plates, by the collector Joseph Grego.

Their son, George Augustus Quentin, a major of the 10th Hussars, married in 1845 Anne Medlycott, daughter of the Rev. John Thomas Medlycott, of Rockets Castle, Waterford. Their daughter, Augusta Laurell (or Lawrell), married, in 1848, Captain Charles Francis Compton, formerly of the Madras Army, 48th regiment.
