= Charles William Beauclerk =

English cricketer

Charles William Beauclerk (7 May 1816 – 23 May 1863) was an English first-class cricketer active 1835–37 who played for Oxford University and Marylebone Cricket Club (MCC). The son of Lord Frederick Beauclerk, he was born in Kimpton, Hertfordshire and died in Boulogne-sur-Mer. He appeared in twelve first-class matches.

== Notes ==
- Haygarth, Arthur (1996) [1862]. Scores & Biographies, Volume 1 (1744–1826). Kennington: Frederick Lillywhite. ISBN 978-19-00592-23-9.
- Haygarth, Arthur (1997) [1862]. Scores & Biographies, Volume 2 (1827–1840). Kennington: Frederick Lillywhite. ISBN 978-19-00592-23-9.
