= Richard Beckett (cricketer) =

English cricketer

Personal information
- Full name: Richard Beckett
- Born: 18 June 1772; Leeds, Yorkshire, England
- Died: 28 July 1809 (aged 37); Talavera de la Reina, Toledo, Spain

Domestic team information
- Years: Team
- 1804: Marylebone Cricket Club

Richard Beckett (18 June 1772 – 28 July 1809) was an English amateur cricketer and a captain in the Coldstream Guards during the Napoleonic Wars.

== Early life and cricket ==
The son of John Beckett of Meanwood, he was born at Leeds in June 1772. Beckett made nine appearances in important matches from 1804 to 1807, playing three matches apiece for the Marylebone Cricket Club and England, in addition to playing one match each for three other teams. He scored 120 runs across his nine matches, with a highest score of 34.

== Military career ==
Beckett was commissioned into the Coldstream Guards in January 1800, when he purchased the rank of ensign. He served during the Napoleonic Wars, seeing action in Egypt, Germany, Denmark, and the Peninsular War. It was in the Peninsular campaign that he was killed in action during the closing stages of the Battle of Talavera on 29 July 1809, at which point he held the rank of captain. His death is mentioned in one of the main histories of the Peninsular War:

"Captain Samuel Walker of the 3rd Regiment of Guards like his gallant companion in arms Captain Richard Beckett of the Coldstream Guards fell on the 28th of July in the prime of life and in the moment of victory on the plains of Talavera. These officers had fought the battles of their country in Egypt in Germany in Denmark and in Portugal and their fellow townsmen the inhabitants of Leeds erected a monument in the parish church of that place to commemorate their public services and to hand down their memory to future ages".

The memorial to Beckett and his friend Walker is in St Peter's Parish Church, Leeds. The inscription says:

"To the memory of Captain Samuel Walker of the Third Regiment of Guards and Captain Richard Beckett of the Coldstream Regiment of Guards, natives of Leeds, who having bravely served their country together in Egypt, Germany, Denmark and Portugal fell in the prime of life at the glorious battle of Talavera in Spain on the 28th of July 1809. Their fellow townsmen dedicate this monument".

He was the first important cricketer to be killed on active service.
