= 1795 English cricket season =

Cricket season review

The enigmatic Marylebone Thursday Club made its bow in the 1795 English cricket season. In Samuel Britcher's opinion, it was the Middlesex county XI. Details of 26 matches are known, but few were historically important. (Note: Any match listed in the ACS' Important Match Guide (1981) is historically important, and therefore of the highest standard, whether or not a scorecard might exist. The same applies to numerous matches discovered by researchers since 1981. For further information, see First-class cricket.)

== MCC v Thursday Club ==
Ostensibly, the Marylebone Thursday Club was a group who gathered at Lord's Old Ground (Lord's) each Thursday to practice or play cricket. Samuel Britcher, however, pointed out that they were moreorless the same people who played for Middlesex. While it would be an easy option to label all these teams as Middlesex, it would not necessarily be correct.

There were five MCC v Thursday Club matches in 1795, four in May and one at the end of June. The Thursday Club won three, MCC two. The teams were all-square at the end of May, so the June match may have been arranged as a "decider". MCC won the first and fourth matches by two wickets, and by 94 runs, respectively. The second and third matches were victories for the Thursday Club by 8 wickets, and by 38 runs.

The final match ended in a win for the Thursday Club by 3 wickets.

== England matches ==
England played four matches with mixed results. The first was against MCC at Lord's, and MCC won by 15 runs. In August, England met Hampshire twice on Dartford Brent. They won the first by 16 runs. The second match was a victory for Hampshire by 4 wickets. This is believed to have been the final important match ever played on the Brent, which had been a major venue throughout the 18th century. Matches in Dartford after 1795 were played at Bowman's Lodge on Dartford Heath. England's fourth match was against Kent on Penenden Heath, near Maidstone, and they won by 5 wickets.

== Other events ==
Berkshire had two matches at Lord's. They lost to Middlesex by 233 runs in July, and to MCC by 2 wickets in August.

Sir Horatio Mann arranged three matches on his new Dandelion Paddock ground, near Margate, in September. The first was against Richard Leigh's XI, and Mann's XI won that game by 37 runs. There was a return two weeks later, which Leigh's XI won by an innings and 98 runs. Between those two matches, Mann's XI lost to the Earl of Darnley's XI by 242 runs.

Leigh's XI played two matches against the Earl of Winchilsea's XI. These were both played in Hampshire: first on Windmill Down, where Winchilsea's XI won by 113 runs; then on Itchin Stoke Down, where Leigh's XI won by 3 wickets.

There were three matches at Lord's between Winchilsea's XI and that of Colonel Charles Lennox. The latter won all three by margins of 48 runs, 10 wickets, and 129 runs.

== Bibliography ==
- ACS (1981). A Guide to Important Cricket Matches Played in the British Isles 1709–1863. Nottingham: ACS. OCLC 85045528.
- Britcher, Samuel (1795). A Complete List of all the Grand Matches of Cricket that have been Played (1790–1805; annual series). London: W. S. Blake. OCLC 83523010.
- Haygarth, Arthur (1996) [1862]. Scores & Biographies, Volume 1 (1744–1826). Kennington: Frederick Lillywhite. ISBN 978-19-00592-23-9.
- Warner, Pelham (1946). Lords: 1787–1945. London: Harrap. OCLC 877106024.
