= 1806 English cricket season =

Cricket season review

The 1806 English cricket season was the 20th since the foundation of Marylebone Cricket Club (MCC). The first two Gentlemen v Players matches took place, but the fixture was not played again until 1819. Details of seven historically important eleven-a-side matches are known. (Note: Any match listed in the ACS' Important Match Guide (1981) is historically important, and therefore of the highest standard, whether or not a scorecard might exist. The same applies to numerous matches discovered by researchers since 1981. For further information, see First-class cricket.)

== Events ==
- The inaugural Gentlemen v Players match was held.
- With the Napoleonic War continuing, loss of investment and manpower impacted cricket and only seven matches have been recorded in 1806:
  - 16–18 June: England v Hampshire @ Lord's Old Ground
  - 30 June: England v Surrey @ Lord's Old Ground
  - 7–9 July: Gentlemen v Players @ Lord's Old Ground
  - 14–16 July: Surrey v England @ Moulsey Hurst
  - 21 & 25 July: Gentlemen v Players @ Lord's Old Ground
  - 5–6 August: Kent v England @ Bowman's Lodge, Dartford
  - 25–28 August: Hampshire v England @ Itchin Stoke Down

== Bibliography ==
- ACS (1981). A Guide to Important Cricket Matches Played in the British Isles 1709–1863. Nottingham: ACS. OCLC 85045528.
- Haygarth, Arthur (1996) [1862]. Scores & Biographies, Volume 1 (1744–1826). Kennington: Frederick Lillywhite. ISBN 978-19-00592-23-9.
- Warner, Pelham (1946). Lords: 1787–1945. London: Harrap. OCLC 877106024.
