= Samuel Bridger =

English cricketer

Samuel Bridger (born 11 May 1777) was an English professional cricketer.

He was mainly associated with Surrey and he made 21 known appearances from 1804 to 1825.

== Bibliography ==
- Haygarth, Arthur (1996) [1862]. Scores & Biographies, Volume 1 (1744–1826). Kennington: Frederick Lillywhite. ISBN 978-19-00592-23-9.
