= John Hammond (cricketer) =

English cricketer

John Hammond (15 January 1769 – 15 October 1844) was an English cricketer of the late 18th and early 19th century.

Hammond made his known debut in the 1790 season and played in 123 cricket matches to the 1816 season. A genuine all-rounder, he was a left-handed batsman but he bowled right-arm slow underarm. He was a good fielder and an occasional wicket-keeper.

Hammond played for the Players in the first two Gentlemen v Players matches in 1806. His son, Charles, played, as did his grandson Ernest Hammond.

== Bibliography ==
- Carlaw, Derek (2020). Kent County Cricketers, A to Z: Part One (1806–1914) (PDF). Cardiff: ACS.
