= Noah Mann Jr =

English cricketer

Personal information
- Full name: Noah Mann
- Born: 1783; Northchapel, Sussex, England
- Died: 1825 (aged 41–42); London, England
- Batting: Unknown
- Bowling: Unknown
- Role: Cricketer

Domestic team information
- Years: Team
- 1807–1818: Marylebone Cricket Club

Noah Mann Jr (1783 at Northchapel, Sussex – 1825 in London) was an English professional cricketer. His father was Noah Mann of Hambledon.

== Career ==
Mann was mainly associated with Marylebone Cricket Club (MCC), being engaged on the club's ground staff for several seasons. He made 9 known appearances from 1807 to 1818.

== External sources ==
- CricketArchive record
