= Robert Robinson (cricketer, born 1765) =

English cricketer

Robert Robinson (1765 at Ash, Surrey – 2 September 1822 at Ash) was an English cricketer who played for Hampshire at the time of the Hambledon Club and also for Surrey.

He was a specialist left-handed batsman noted for powerful hitting to the off team, particularly his mastery of the cut shot.

In John Nyren's The Cricketers of my Time, Robinson is listed among the author's "most eminent players in the Hambledon Club when it was in its glory", but Nyren does not otherwise mention Robinson. The period of this list is limited to the latter years of Hambledon's existence (i.e., from about 1785) but it indicates the esteem in which Robinson was held as a player.

The earliest biographical information about Robinson is provided by Arthur Haygarth. Haygarth says that Robinson belonged to a farming family. He was at one time a gamekeeper, for James Lawrell.

Robinson became a cricketer despite the loss of two fingers from his right hand when he was a boy. He had to have special grooves made in his bat handle because of this, to help him form a grip.

Robinson played for the Players in the inaugural and second Gentlemen v Players matches in 1806.
