= Thomas Mellish =

English cricketer

Thomas Mellish (1773 – 29 July 1837 in Uxbridge, Middlesex) was an English amateur cricketer who made 52 known appearances in important matches between 1791 and 1815.

He was an early member of Marylebone Cricket Club (MCC) whose teams he most often represented. He was an occasional patron of cricket, his own T Mellish's XI being active in a number of matches between 1801 and 1807.

He was educated at Eton but surprisingly little is known about Mellish, although he was undoubtedly a prominent amateur player of his time. He is not mentioned in Scores & Biographies except in the scorecards.

== External sources ==
- CricketArchive record
