= George Plumptre =

British journalist

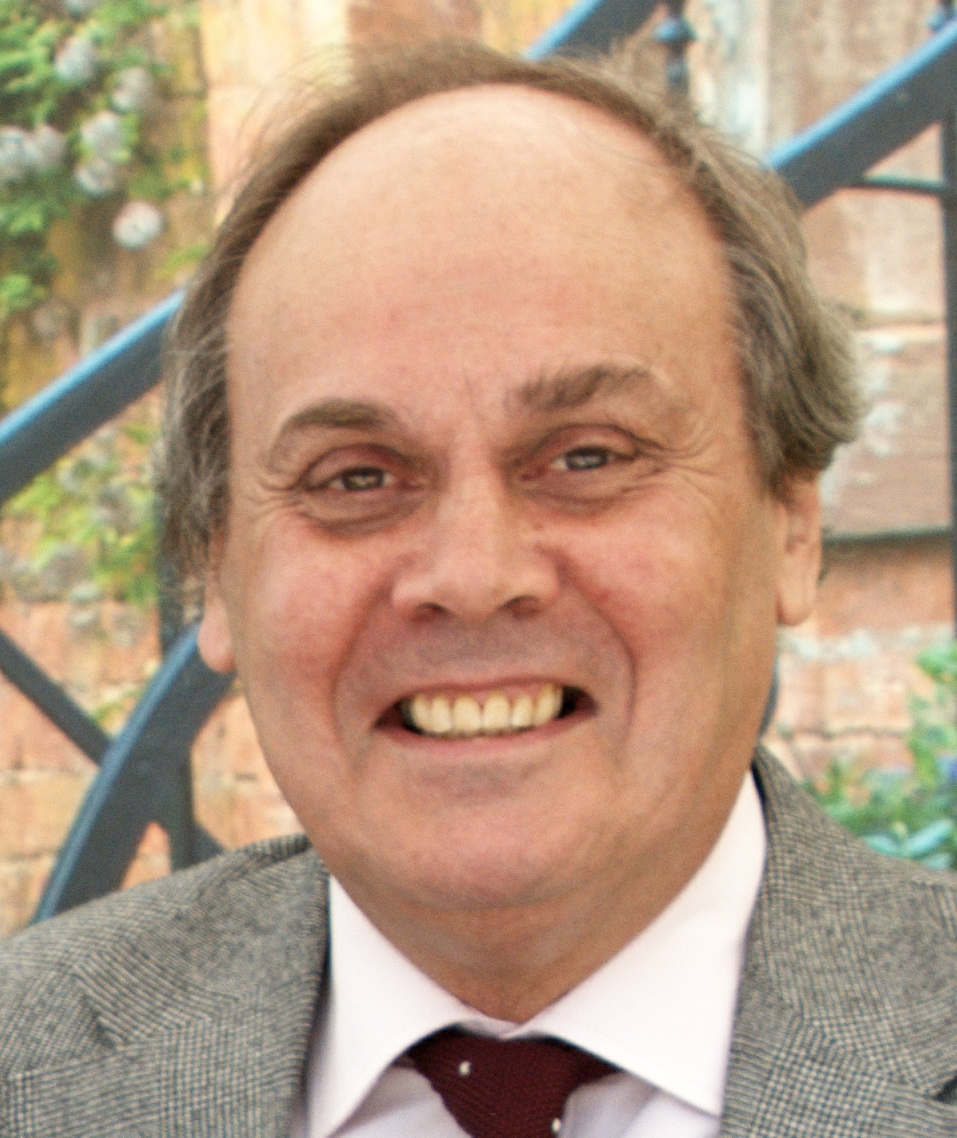
- Born: Wyndham George Plumptre; 24 April 1956 (age 70)
- Education: Jesus College, Cambridge
- Alma mater: Radley College
- Occupations: Charity CEO, writer
- Spouse: Annabel Williams

The Honourable Wyndham George Plumptre (born 24 April 1956) is chief executive of the National Gardens Scheme. He is an expert on gardens and has been an author and journalist, including gardening correspondent for The Times (1993–96).

The son of FitzWalter Brook Plumptre, 21st Lord FitzWalter, by his wife Margaret Melesina, sister of the Conservative politician, soldier and journalist Bill Deedes, later created Baron Deedes, and younger brother of Julian Brook Plumptre, 22nd Lord FitzWalter, Plumptre was raised at the family home, Goodnestone Park, at Goodnestone, Dover, then educated at Radley College and Jesus College, Cambridge (B.A. 1978).

A writer since 1980, Plumptre is a contributor to Country Life, Homes & Gardens, The Daily Telegraph, and other publications. He has written numerous books about gardening, including Collins Book of British Gardens (1985), The Latest Country Garden (1988), Garden Ornament (1989), Classic Planting and Royal Gardens (2005) and The English Country House Garden (2014)- and cricket, including Back Page Cricket (1987), Homes of Cricket (1988) and The Golden Age of Cricket (1989). He also produced a biography of King Edward VII, published in 1995.

From 1993 to 1996, alongside his other activities, Plumptre was gardening correspondent for The Times; in 1999 he founded Greenfingers, now the UK's largest online-only garden specialist. In 2011, Plumptre became chief executive of the National Gardens Scheme, which opens gardens to the public to raise money for charity. Currently it donates £3m annually, principally to nursing and health charities, of which it is the most significant funder in the UK.

In 1984 Plumptre married Alexandra Cantacuzene-Speransky; they have two sons and a daughter. They were divorced in 2008. In 2010 Plumptre married Annabel Williams.
