= Henry Bentley (cricketer) =

English cricketer

Henry Bentley (19 February 1782 – 18 September 1857) was an English cricketer who played for Marylebone Cricket Club (MCC), Middlesex and Hampshire in 67 matches from 1801 to 1822.

A professional player on the MCC staff, he was a right-handed batsman and an occasional wicketkeeper. He played for the Players in the inaugural Gentlemen v Players match in 1806.

When he retired from playing, he became an umpire and a cricket writer. He produced the comprehensively titled A Correct Account of all the Cricket Matches which have been played by the Mary-le-bone Club, and all other principal matches, from the Year 1786 to 1822 inclusive (1823), a facsimile edition of which was published in 1997, incorporating additional material by David Rayvern Allen.

== Bibliography ==
- Haygarth, Arthur (1996) [1862]. Scores & Biographies, Volume 1 (1744–1826). Kennington: Frederick Lillywhite. ISBN 978-19-00592-23-9.
- Haygarth, Arthur (1997) [1862]. Scores & Biographies, Volume 2 (1827–1840). Kennington: Frederick Lillywhite. ISBN 978-19-00592-23-9.
