= Lord Frederick Beauclerk =

The Revd Lord Frederick Beauclerk
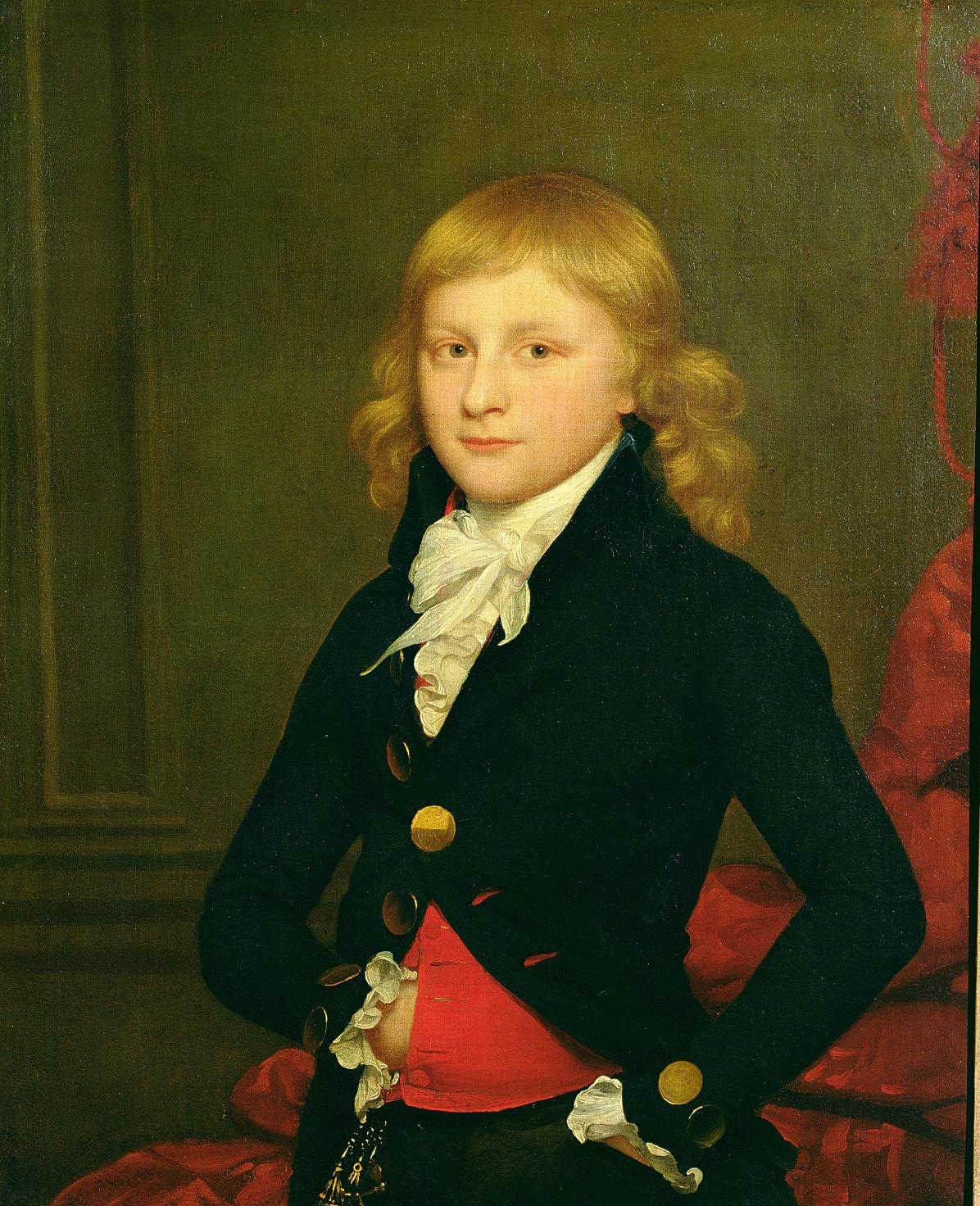

Personal information
- Full name: Lord Frederick de Vere Beauclerk
- Born: 8 May 1773; London, England
- Died: 22 April 1850 (aged 76); Westminster, England
- Batting: Right-handed
- Bowling: Slow underarm
- Role: All-rounder

Domestic team information
- Years: Team
- 1791–1825: Marylebone Cricket Club (President, 1826)
- Source: Cricinfo, 13 July 2009

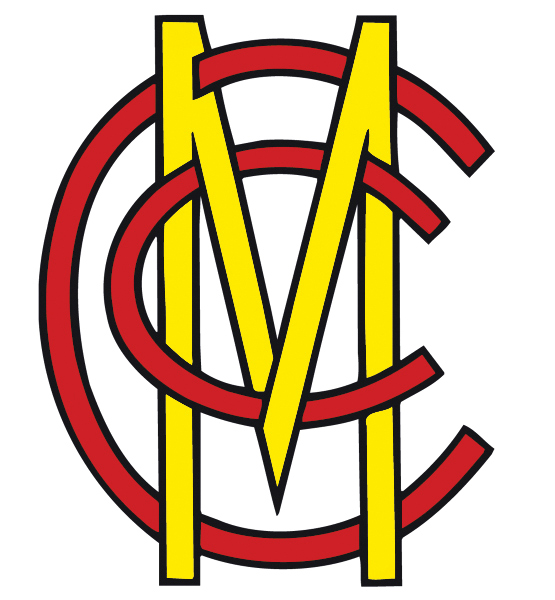
MCC logo

The Revd Lord Frederick de Vere Beauclerk (8 May 1773 – 22 April 1850), a 19th-century aristocratic Anglican priest, was an outstanding but controversial English cricketer, the leading "amateur" player of the Napoleonic era.

Beauclerk served as President of Marylebone Cricket Club (MCC) for 1826–27, after playing cricket for 35 years from 1791 to 1825.

== Early life and background ==
Lord Frederick Beauclerk was born in London on 8 May 1773, the fourth son of Aubrey, 5th Duke of St Albans, and his wife Lady Catherine Ponsonby, elder daughter of William, 2nd Earl of Bessborough, by his wife Lady Caroline Cavendish.

After Eton College, Beauclerk went to Trinity College, Cambridge in 1790 aged 17, graduating Master of Arts in 1795. He was later awarded the degree of Doctor of Divinity (Cantab) in 1824.

== Ecclesiastical career ==
In common with other younger sons of the nobility, Beauclerk entered into holy orders, being ordained deacon in 1795 and priest in 1797.

He served as Curate of St Bartholomew's Church at Groton, Suffolk, from 1795 to 1797. Baroness Dacre appointed him Vicar of St Peter & St Paul's Church at Kimpton, Hertfordshire, in 1797. In 1827 he was presented to the parish living of St Mary's Church, Redbourn, and then to St Michael's Church, St Albans in 1828.

However, Lord Frederick Beauclerk "never allowed his clerical duties to interfere materially with the claims of cricket" and "his sermons were legendary for their dullness".

== Cricket career ==
Beauclerk was a right-handed batsman and slow right under-arm bowler. Recognised as an all-rounder, he generally fielded at slip. His career spanned the 1791 till 1825 seasons. Beauclerk's height was 5 ft 9 in weighing between 11 st and 12 st, in his prime.

Beauclerk's cricketing talent as an accurate slow bowler was spotted at Cambridge University by the Earl of Winchilsea and Nottingham, who invited him to play for Marylebone Cricket Club. Beauclerk's important debut was for MCC v Gentlemen of Kent at Lord's Old Ground on 2 & 3 June 1791 "now but 18 years of age". Playing two important matches in the 1791 season, Beauclerk was then unavailable until the 1795 season while completing his Divinity studies, before developing as a regular and prolific cricket player.

Having started as a bowler, Beauclerk honed his batting skills becoming better known as a hard-hitting batsman, but was always regarded as an all-rounder.

Beauclerk played for the Gentlemen in the inaugural and second Gentlemen v Players matches of 1806.

Beauclerk hit 170 playing for Homerton against Montpelier Cricket Club in 1807, a match not widely recognised as having important status. His score set a record for the highest individual innings in all forms of cricket lasting until 1820 when it was beaten by William Ward, who scored 278.

In 1810, Beauclerk and Thomas Howard were due to play George Osbaldeston and William Lambert in a lucrative single wicket match. Squire Osbaldeston was taken ill just before the match and Beauclerk flatly refused to postpone it, exclaiming: "Play or Pay"! Lambert had to play on his own but he was a canny professional who was well aware of Beauclerk's weakness: an uncontrollable temper. By deliberately bowling wides, Lambert caused Beauclerk to lose both his temper and his wicket with the result that Lambert won the match by 15 runs.

The humiliated and vindictive Beauclerk would have his revenge on Osbaldeston and Lambert in years to come but first he used his influence at MCC to amend the Laws of Cricket with wide balls being banned, for the first time, in 1811.

In 1817, Beauclerk played in a highly controversial match at Nottingham where he captained an England team while Osbaldeston and Lambert were given men for Nottingham Cricket Club. Accusations of match-fixing were made by both teams and Beauclerk was able to produce witnesses who implicated Lambert. As a result, MCC banned Lambert from ever playing again at Lord's Cricket Ground. Osbaldeston's turn came in 1818 after he too lost his temper when beaten at single wicket by George Brown of the Sussex county team. Osbaldeston was so vexed as to resign his MCC membership; later repenting and requesting to be reinstated, Beauclerk refused his application.

Beauclerk persuaded MCC to call a meeting to ban roundarm bowling in 1822, even though he had been known to claim wagers when playing alongside early roundarmers like John Willes. According to George, 4th Baron Harris: "When he [Willes] played on the team of Lord Frederick his bowling was fair, when against him, the contrary".

Beauclerk served as President of Marylebone Cricket Club in 1826, continuing to play for MCC in minor matches while in office. Thereafter, he was a regular attendee at Lord's to watch matches, from time to time lending his patronage by standing sponsor. A "persistent symbol of insensitive autocracy long after his retirement", Beauclerk was invariably accompanied by his "nasty, yapping dog" whereas the rule for other MCC members was: "No dogs allowed".

== Style and technique ==
Beauclerk was one of the best single wicket cricket players of the 19th century. His batting style was "rather scientific, in the more orthodox manner of the professionals", while his under-arm bowling was very slow, but extremely accurate and he could get the ball to rise abruptly off a length.

Although his batting style was described as scientific, Beauclerk was also impulsive as "he sometimes lost his wicket by trying to cut straight balls". He was a hard-hitting batsman with fine strokeplay, "especially to the off". He improved his batsmanship by modelling himself on William Beldham, but he lacked the latter's natural flair.

Beauclerk was also an astute tactician and it has been recorded that he carefully studied opposing batsmen and had the ability to quickly understand their strengths and weaknesses so as to set his field accordingly.

Beauclerk wore a white beaver hat when playing, the remainder of his outfit being a white shirt, nankeen breeches, a scarlet sash and white stockings. He once threw his hat down on the pitch in frustration at his inability to dismiss the obdurate batsman Tom Walker, known as "Old Everlasting". Beauclerk called Walker a "confounded old beast" but, when Walker was asked about it afterwards, he shrugged and said: "I don't care what he says".

== Personality ==
Beauclerk became renowned as one of the most controversial figures in cricket history. His competitive approach to the game was well summarised in a verse written by a contemporary:

My Lord he comes next, and will make you all stare
With his little tricks, a long way from fair.

Much that is hagiography exists about cricketers but "an unqualified eulogy of Beauclerk has never been seen and that is significant". Although he was a cleric and ostensibly against gambling, it is estimated that he made up to £600 a year from playing cricket, which at the time was funded mostly by gambling. A vicar "completely devoid of Christian charity", in this vein, Rowland Bowen likened Beauclerk to Talleyrand as "a cleric without, it would seem, the faintest interest in being a clergyman or any kind of Christian".

Beauclerk has been described as "an unmitigated scoundrel". Among the quotations about him is one that he was a "foul-mouthed, dishonest man who was one of the most hated figures in society ... he bought and sold matches as though they were lots at an auction". Another described him as "cruel, unforgiving, cantankerous and bitter".

In an early example of gamesmanship, he is said to have occasionally suspended an expensive gold watch from the middle stump whilst batting, the inference being that his batting was sound enough, or the bowling bad enough, for it to remain unscathed. Sadly, there is no record of how many watches Beauclerk may have lost in such fashion.

When Beauclerk died in 1850, his unpopularity was such that The Times did not publish his obituary.

== Family and personal life ==
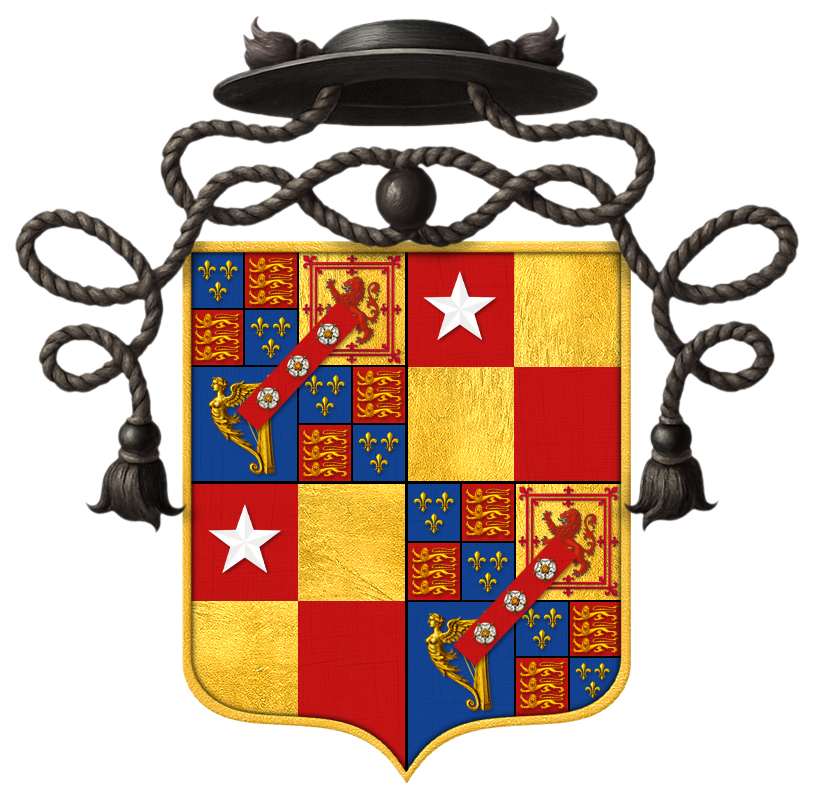
Coat of arms of the Revd Lord Frederick Beauclerk

The fourth son and fifth child of Aubrey Beauclerk, 5th Duke of St Albans, he was a descendant of Charles II and Nell Gwyn.

He married the Hon. Charlotte Dillon-Lee, younger daughter and heiress in her issue of Charles, 12th Viscount Dillon, on 3 July 1813. Lord and Lady Frederick Beauclerk had four children:

- Caroline Henrietta Frederica Beauclerk (1815–1878), married Charles-Eugène Leloup (d. 1878)
- Charles William Beauclerk (1816–1863), married Penelope Hulkes (d. 1890)
- Aubrey Frederick James Beauclerk (1817–1853), late Captain in the Scots Guards
- Henrietta Mary Beauclerk (1818–1887), married Sir Edward Rokewode-Gage, 9th Baronet.

His sons, Charles and Aubrey Beauclerk, also in remainder to the dukedom, played important cricket as did his nephew, William Beauclerk, 9th Duke of St Albans.

Beauclerk inherited the lordship of the manor and patronage of the advowson of Winchfield, Hampshire, as well as owning a London townhouse at 68 Grosvenor Street in Mayfair, where he died aged 76 on 22 April 1850. Buried at St Mary's Church, Winchfield, a tablet in memory of "his many virtues" was erected in the nave by his widow.
