= 1800 English cricket season =

Cricket season review

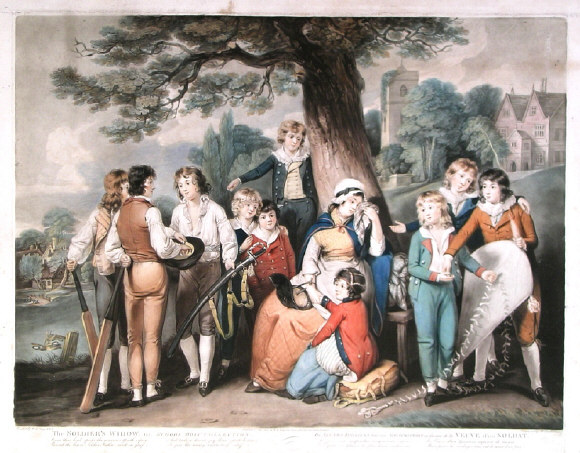
Mezzotint by Dunkarton & Ward after W. R. Bigg, The Soldier's Widow, dated 1800. Note the two cricket bats on the left.

The 1800 English cricket season included numerous matches involving prominent town clubs like Rochester, Woolwich, Homerton, Richmond, Storrington, Montpelier, and Thames Ditton. Details of 20 matches are known, but few were historically important. (Note: Any match listed in the ACS' Important Match Guide (1981) is historically important, and therefore of the highest standard, whether or not a scorecard might exist. The same applies to numerous matches discovered by researchers since 1981. For further information, see First-class cricket.)

== North of England matches ==
In the Leicester v Nottingham match on 25 and 26 August, Nottingham made only 61 in their first innings, and yet they won the match by an innings and 38 runs. Leicester were dismissed for 15 and 8, an aggregate of 23 which Rowland Bowen described as "probably the lowest recorded aggregate for both innings in an important match".

On 29 September, the Nottingham v Sheffield match in Mansfield was another low-scoring one. Nottingham scored 67 and 102. Joe Dennis played well with scores of 16 and 29, helping Nottingham to win by 123 runs. Sheffield in reply made just 24 and 22.

== MCC and Lord's Old Ground ==
Marylebone Cricket Club (MCC) played in four matches which were home and away against Woolwich and Rochester. They met Woolwich first on 28 and 29 May at Lord's Old Ground (Lord's), and were well beaten by an innings and 94 runs. A return match took place 23 and 24 June on Barrack Field in Woolwich. Again, MCC were outclassed, and Woolwich won by 123 runs.

The matches against Rochester were played a fortnight apart in July. Rochester won by 11 runs at Lord's, and by 3 wickets at Marsh's New Ground in Rochester.

There were five more matches at Lord's, two of which were "odds" games: an Fourteen of England against Surrey in June, which England won by thirteen wickets; and Fourteen of England against Twelve of Surrey in August, which England won by 51 runs.

The other three matches were eleven-a-side. The first was between elevens selected by two MCC members, R. Whitehead and John Gibbons. Whitehead's XI won by 52 runs. From 11 to 13 June, England and Surrey met on level terms, and Surrey won by three wickets. On 14 and 15 July, England played a team called the Ws & Hs, who won by seven wickets.

== Town club matches ==
Among the prominent town clubs were Homerton, Montpelier, Richmond, and Woolwich. In June, Montpelier went to Homerton, and won by an innings and 5 runs. Then, on Aram's New Ground, which was in Montpelier Gardens, they defeated Richmond by 52 runs.

In July, Richmond hosted Montpelier on Richmond Green, and won by 69 runs. At the end of the month, Montpelier played Woolwich on Barrack Field, where Woolwich won by 8 wickets.

== Other events ==
- Marylebone Cricket Club (MCC) made revisions to the Laws of Cricket which were republished in their entirety.
- Robert Robinson is believed to have been the first batsman to try to introduce leg guards, but his experiment was unsuccessful.
- Cricket may have begun to feel the impact of the Napoleonic Wars through loss of investment and manpower, which reduced the number of important matches. The sport's situation became desperate in the years before the Battle of Waterloo in 1815.

== Bibliography ==
- ACS (1981). A Guide to Important Cricket Matches Played in the British Isles 1709–1863. Nottingham: ACS. OCLC 85045528.
- Bowen, Rowland (1970). Cricket: A History of its Growth and Development. London: Eyre & Spottiswoode. ISBN 978-04-13278-60-9.
- Buckley, G. B. (1935). Fresh Light on 18th Century Cricket. Birmingham: Cotterell & Co. OCLC 23450280.
- Haygarth, Arthur (1996) [1862]. Scores & Biographies, Volume 1 (1744–1826). Kennington: Frederick Lillywhite. ISBN 978-19-00592-23-9.
- Waghorn, H. T. (2005) [1906]. The Dawn of Cricket. London: J. W. McKenzie. ISBN 978-09-47821-17-3.
