= 1754 English cricket season =

Cricket season review

Details have survived of four historically important eleven-a-side matches in the 1754 English cricket season, and two notable single wicket matches. (Note: Any match listed in the ACS' Important Match Guide (1981) is historically important, and therefore of the highest standard, whether or not a scorecard might exist. The same applies to numerous matches discovered by researchers since 1981. For further information, see First-class cricket.) Dartford was the pre-eminent club. The Leeds Intelligencer, forerunner of the Yorkshire Post, began publication; it has always been a noted source for cricket in Yorkshire.

== Eleven-a-side matches ==
London v Dartford
1 July, Artillery Ground.
The Daily Advertiser on Friday, 28 June, announced: "Wickets pitched at Twelve, and to begin play at One". London made 78 and 50; Dartford replied with 55 and 74/7. Dartford won by 3 wickets.

Surrey v Sussex
22 July, Guildford.
The match was advertised as: "Guildford, Ripley, Thursley and the lower part of Surrey against Bolney, Brighton and the eastern part of Sussex". The stake was 20 guineas a side. Result unknown.

Woolwich v Dartford
24 August, Barrack Field, Woolwich.
Dartford won.

Dartford v Woolwich
26 August, Dartford Brent.
Woolwich won.
Both of the Dartford v Woolwich games were mentioned in the same report by Read's Weekly Journal dated Saturday, 31 August: "Dartford won away & lost at home against Woolwich on Sat. & Mon., 24 & 26 Aug. respectively".

== Single wicket ==
The Daily Advertiser on Friday, 28 June, announced for the same day a two-a-side game at Upper Fountain (the notice said: 'behind George Taylor's') in Deptford. The players were Tom Faulkner and Joe Harris against John Capon and Perry.

On Tuesday, 24 September, there was a single wicket game at Brompton in Kent between the well-known Thomas Brandon of Dartford, and a player called Parr of Chatham. The stakes were five guineas each and Brandon won by 47 runs.

== Other events ==
21–22 June (F–S). Midhurst & Petworth v Slindon on Bowling Green, Lavington Common. The former apparently won by eight wickets, and the match seems to mark the swansong of Slindon as a great team, as they are not mentioned in the sources thereafter. Sussex cricket as a whole went into decline for many years and, although a number of inter-parish games were recorded over the next decade or so, it was not until 1766 that Sussex again took part in historically important matches. This temporary demise of Sussex is probably explained by the death of the 2nd Duke of Richmond in 1750. He was the greatest patron of Sussex cricket, and of Slindon in particular. His co-patron and good friend Sir William Gage, had died in 1744.

== First mentions ==
=== Clubs and teams ===
- Midhurst & Petworth
- Woolwich

=== Players ===
- Parr (Chatham)

=== Venues ===
- Barrack Field, Woolwich
- Bowling Green, Lavington Common
- Brompton (unspecified)
- Guildford (unspecified)

== Bibliography ==
- ACS (1981). A Guide to Important Cricket Matches Played in the British Isles 1709–1863. Nottingham: ACS. OCLC 85045528.
- Buckley, G. B. (1935). Fresh Light on 18th Century Cricket. Birmingham: Cotterell & Co. OCLC 23450280.
- Buckley, G. B. (1937). Fresh Light on pre-Victorian Cricket. Birmingham: Cotterell & Co. OCLC 23469107.
- McCann, Tim (2004). Sussex Cricket in the Eighteenth Century (PDF). Vol. 88. Lewes: West Sussex Record Office. ISBN 978-08-54450-55-8.
- Waghorn, H. T. (1899). Cricket Scores, Notes, &c. From 1730–1773. Edinburgh: Blackwood. OCLC 1086375331.
