= 1798 English cricket season =

Cricket season review

Matches involving town clubs became more commonplace in the 1798 English cricket season, and only a handful of county teams were active. Details of 20 matches are known, but few were historically important. (Note: Any match listed in the ACS' Important Match Guide (1981) is historically important, and therefore of the highest standard, whether or not a scorecard might exist. The same applies to numerous matches discovered by researchers since 1981. For further information, see First-class cricket.)

== Matches ==
The important matches in 1798 involved either or both of England and Marylebone Cricket Club (MCC). They played each twice on Lord's Old Ground (Lord's), and MCC won both times—by 17 runs in June, and by 7 wickets in July. England defeated Surrey three times, all of the matches played at Lord's—by 128 runs in June, by an innings & 12 runs, and by 13 runs, also in August.

== Other events ==
As in 1797, the Montpelier Cricket Club had a fairly strong team, especially with given men. They played two matches against MCC, winning by 55 runs at Lord's, but losing by 175 runs in Montpelier Gardens. Other town club matches, mostly recorded by Samuel Britcher, involved Croydon Cricket Club and Woolwich Cricket Club.

== Bibliography ==
- ACS (1981). A Guide to Important Cricket Matches Played in the British Isles 1709–1863. Nottingham: ACS. OCLC 85045528.
- Britcher, Samuel (1798). A Complete List of all the Grand Matches of Cricket that have been Played (1790–1805; annual series). London: W. S. Blake. OCLC 83523010.
- Haygarth, Arthur (1996) [1862]. Scores & Biographies, Volume 1 (1744–1826). Kennington: Frederick Lillywhite. ISBN 978-19-00592-23-9.
- Warner, Pelham (1946). Lords: 1787–1945. London: Harrap. OCLC 877106024.
