= 1802 English cricket season =

Cricket season review

The 1802 English cricket season was the 16th since the foundation of Marylebone Cricket Club (MCC). Cricket by this time was being heavily impacted by the Napoleonic War. E. H. Budd, who went on to become one of the most famous batsmen of the early 19th century, made his debut in historically important matches. Details of eighteen historically important eleven-a-side matches are known. (Note: Any match listed in the ACS' Important Match Guide (1981) is historically important, and therefore of the highest standard, whether or not a scorecard might exist. The same applies to numerous matches discovered by researchers since 1981. For further information, see First-class cricket.)

== Events ==
Cricket was continuing to feel the impact of Great Britain's war against the Napoleonic Empire through a loss of investment which for many years reduced the number of important matches. MCC, based at Lord's Old Ground continued to play the leading role in the sport. Several matches took place involving the more prominent "town clubs" such as Homerton, Montpelier, Richmond and Woolwich.

A "recent discovery" by the ACS is the match at Lord's on 8 June between Charles Lennox's XI and George Leycester's XI.

== Bibliography ==
- ACS (1981). A Guide to Important Cricket Matches Played in the British Isles 1709–1863. Nottingham: ACS. OCLC 85045528.
- Haygarth, Arthur (1996) [1862]. Scores & Biographies, Volume 1 (1744–1826). Kennington: Frederick Lillywhite. ISBN 978-19-00592-23-9.
- Warner, Pelham (1946). Lords: 1787–1945. London: Harrap. OCLC 877106024.
