= 1797 English cricket season =

Cricket season review

The 1797 English cricket season marked 200 years since the earliest known definite reference to the sport in 1597. Marylebone Cricket Club (MCC) enjoyed great success on the field, winning nine of their eleven known matches. Details of 21 matches are known, but few were historically important. (Note: Any match listed in the ACS' Important Match Guide (1981) is historically important, and therefore of the highest standard, whether or not a scorecard might exist. The same applies to numerous matches discovered by researchers since 1981. For further information, see First-class cricket.)

== MCC v Middlesex ==
Marylebone Cricket Club (MCC) met Middlesex twice in May, both matches being played on Lord's Old Ground (Lord's). MCC won the first by 6 wickets, and the second by 288 runs.

== England v Surrey ==
England played Surrey twice at Lord's in June. England won both games, the first by 6 wickets, and the second by 23 runs.

== MCC v Hampshire ==
In August, MCC won both of their two games against Hampshire. The first was played on Itchin Stoke Down, and MCC won by 113 runs. They went on to win the second at Lord's by 6 wickets.

== England v MCC ==
At the end of August, England and MCC played each other at Moulsey Hurst and at Lord's. MCC won the first match by 6 wickets, and England the second by 8 wickets.

== Other events ==
Woolwich played two matches against Croydon at Barrack Field. Woolwich won by 23 runs in August, and by 179 runs in September.

Colonel Charles Lennox and the Earl of Winchilsea organised four matches between their selected teams. Lennox's XI won the first game, and Winchilsea's XI won the next three.

== Bibliography ==
- ACS (1981). A Guide to Important Cricket Matches Played in the British Isles 1709–1863. Nottingham: ACS. OCLC 85045528.
- Britcher, Samuel (1797). A Complete List of all the Grand Matches of Cricket that have been Played (1790–1805; annual series). London: W. S. Blake. OCLC 83523010.
- Haygarth, Arthur (1996) [1862]. Scores & Biographies, Volume 1 (1744–1826). Kennington: Frederick Lillywhite. ISBN 978-19-00592-23-9.
- Waghorn, H. T. (2005) [1906]. The Dawn of Cricket. London: J. W. McKenzie. ISBN 978-09-47821-17-3.
- Warner, Pelham (1946). Lords: 1787–1945. London: Harrap. OCLC 877106024.
