= Sir John Gibbons, 4th Baronet =

English cricketer (1774–1844)

Sir John Gibbons (8 January 1774 – 26 March 1844) was an English amateur cricketer who made 23 known appearances in historically important matches between 1796 and 1801. (Note: Any match listed in the ACS' Important Match Guide (1981) is historically important, and therefore of the highest standard, whether or not a scorecard might exist. The same applies to numerous matches discovered by researchers since 1981. For further information, see First-class cricket.) He was a member of Marylebone Cricket Club (MCC), and played most of his cricket for teams associated with the club. He formed his own team, J. Gibbons' XI, for one match in 1800.

== Known matches ==
Gibbons played in 23 matches which are recognised as historically important.

Date	Match	Venue	Ref.
12 August 1796	Thursday Club v Montpelier & Kennington	Lord's Old Ground (Lord's)	
26 August 1796	Montpelier & Kennington v Thursday Club	Aram's New Ground	
19 May 1797	Charles Lennox's XI v Earl of Winchilsea's XI	Lord's	
4 Sept 1797	Montpelier v Marylebone Cricket Club (MCC)	Aram's New Ground	
2 May 1798	Lord Frederick Beauclerk's XI v John Tufton's XI	Lord's	
9 May 1798	MCC v London	Lord's	
28 May 1798	MCC v Montpelier	Lord's	
6 June 1798	England v Surrey	Lord's	
20 June 1798	MCC v Middlesex	Lord's	
26 June 1798	MCC v England	Lord's	
11 July 1798	MCC v England	Lord's	
10 June 1799	MCC v Thursday Club	Lord's	
24 June 1799	MCC v Thursday Club	Lord's	
30 July 1799	Surrey & MCC v England	Lord's	
1 August 1799	R. Whitehead's XI v Lord Yarmouth's XI	Lord's	
15 August 1799	England v Surrey	Lord's	
19 May 1800	J. Gibbons' XI v R. Whitehead's XI	Lord's	
28 May 1800	MCC v Woolwich	Lord's	
11 June 1800	England v Surrey	Lord's	
30 June 1800	Lord F. Beauclerk's XI v Sir H. W. Marten's XI	Barrack Field	
7 July 1800	MCC v Rochester	Lord's	
14 July 1800	England v Ws and Hs	Lord's	
24 June 1801	England v Surrey	Lord's	

== Later life ==
He succeeded to the Gibbons baronetcy in November 1814. The family's seat was Stanwell Place in Middlesex, and Gibbons died there in 1844.

== Bibliography ==
- ACS (1981). A Guide to Important Cricket Matches Played in the British Isles 1709–1863. Nottingham: ACS. OCLC 85045528.
- Haygarth, Arthur (1996) [1862]. Scores & Biographies, Volume 1 (1744–1826). Kennington: Frederick Lillywhite. ISBN 978-19-00592-23-9.
