= 1800 in sports =

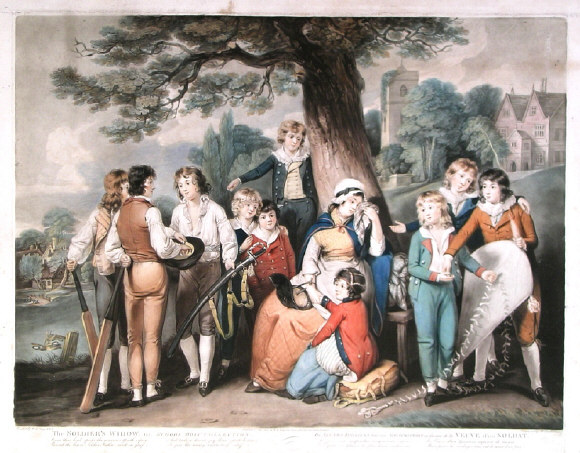
Mezzotint by Dunkarton & Ward after W. R. Bigg, The Soldier's Widow, dated 1800. Note the two cricket bats on the left.

1800 in sports describes the year's events in world sport.

== Boxing ==
Events

- 7 January — Jack Bartholomew retained his English Championship title after drawing with Jem Belcher at St George's Fields in a contest lasting 51 rounds.
- 15 May — Belcher, known as the "Napoleon of the Ring", defeated Bartholomew in 17 rounds on Finchley Common to claim the Championship of England. He held the title until 1805.

== Cricket ==
Events

- Robert Robinson is believed to have been the first batsman to try to introduce leg guards but the experiment was unsuccessful.

England

- Most runs – William Barton 226 (HS 51)
- Most wickets – John Ward 47 (BB 7–?)

== Horse racing ==
England

- The Derby – Champion
- The Oaks – Ephemera
- St Leger Stakes – Champion
