= Robert Ayling (cricketer) =

English cricketer

Personal information
- Relatives: William Ayling (brother) (Note: CricketArchive is the only source which identifies the two Aylings as brothers.)

Domestic team information
- Years: Team
- 1796: Kent
- FC debut: 16 May 1796 Kent v Middlesex
- Last FC: 20 June 1796 Kent v Middlesex
- Source: CricInfo, 15 April 2022

Robert Ayling (dates unknown) was an English cricketer who made two appearances in 1796, both for Kent against Middlesex. He scored a total of 22 runs in his four innings, with a highest score of 11.

He is known to have played for Woolwich Cricket Club in a match in 1806 against Marylebone Cricket Club (MCC) at Lord's Old Ground and for a 23-man Kent in an odds match (Note: An odds match is one in which one team has more players than the other, the aim being to even the chances of victory to an extent.) in 1807 against England (i.e., the "rest" of England) at Penenden Heath. William Ayling, who was possibly his brother, played in both of these matches for the same team.

== Bibliography ==
- Carlaw, Derek (2020). Kent County Cricketers, A to Z: Part One (1806–1914) (PDF). Cardiff: ACS.
- Lewis, Paul (2014). For Kent and Country. Eastbourne: Reveille Press. ISBN 978-19-08336-63-7.
