= Britcher =

Britcher is a surname. Notable people with the surname include:

- Samuel Britcher (died c. 1805), English cricket scorer and archivist
- Summer Britcher (born 1994), American luger
