= 1804 English cricket season =

Cricket season review

The 1804 English cricket season was the 18th since the foundation of Marylebone Cricket Club (MCC). The first Eton v Harrow match may have been played at Lord's Old Ground. Details of ten historically important eleven-a-side matches are known. (Note: Any match listed in the ACS' Important Match Guide (1981) is historically important, and therefore of the highest standard, whether or not a scorecard might exist. The same applies to numerous matches discovered by researchers since 1981. For further information, see First-class cricket.)

== Events ==
- According to a Harrovian who played in the 1805 Eton v Harrow match, the fixture also took place in 1804 with Harrow winning.
- With the Napoleonic War continuing, loss of investment and manpower impacted cricket and only five matches have been recorded in 1804:
  - 18–20 June: Marylebone Cricket Club (MCC) v England @ Lord's Old Ground
  - 27–28 June: MCC and Homerton v Hampshire @ Lord's Old Ground
  - 2 July: MCC v England @ Lord's Old Ground
  - 9 July: England v Surrey @ Lord's Old Ground
  - 23–24 July: MCC v England @ Lord's Old Ground

== Bibliography ==
- ACS (1981). A Guide to Important Cricket Matches Played in the British Isles 1709–1863. Nottingham: ACS. OCLC 85045528.
- Haygarth, Arthur (1996) [1862]. Scores & Biographies, Volume 1 (1744–1826). Kennington: Frederick Lillywhite. ISBN 978-19-00592-23-9.
- Warner, Pelham (1946). Lords: 1787–1945. London: Harrap. OCLC 877106024.
