= James Leggatte =

English cricketer (18th century)

James Leggatte was an English cricketer active in 1789 and 1790. He was an early member of Marylebone Cricket Club (MCC).

== Career ==
Leggatte made his first recorded appearance for the Gentlemen of England in 1789, playing against Middlesex on 25 May at Lord's Old Ground. He scored 13 runs in the first innings, but was dismissed for 0 in the second; it is not known if he bowled in this match. Middlesex won by an innings and 64 runs.

On 3 June 1790, Leggatte played for the Duke of Dorset's XI against the Earl of Winchilsea's XI, again at Lord's Old Ground. Winchilsea's XI won by 3 wickets. Leggatte scored 1 and 2. He took two wickets in each innings, and also held two catches.

Leggatte is known to have played in the Sussex v Hampshire match at Goodwood Park on 22–23 July 1791, but no details have survived except that the match was drawn.

== Bibliography ==
- Britcher, Samuel (1790). A Complete List of all the Grand Matches of Cricket that have been Played in the Year 1790. London: W. S. Blake. OCLC 83523010.
- Britcher, Samuel (1791). A Complete List of all the Grand Matches of Cricket that have been Played in the Year 1791. London: W. S. Blake. OCLC 83523010.
- Haygarth, Arthur (1996) [1862]. Scores & Biographies, Volume 1 (1744–1826). Kennington: Frederick Lillywhite. ISBN 978-19-00592-23-9.
- Waghorn, H. T. (2005) [1906]. The Dawn of Cricket. London: J. W. McKenzie. ISBN 978-09-47821-17-3.
