= Woolwich Common =

Park in London

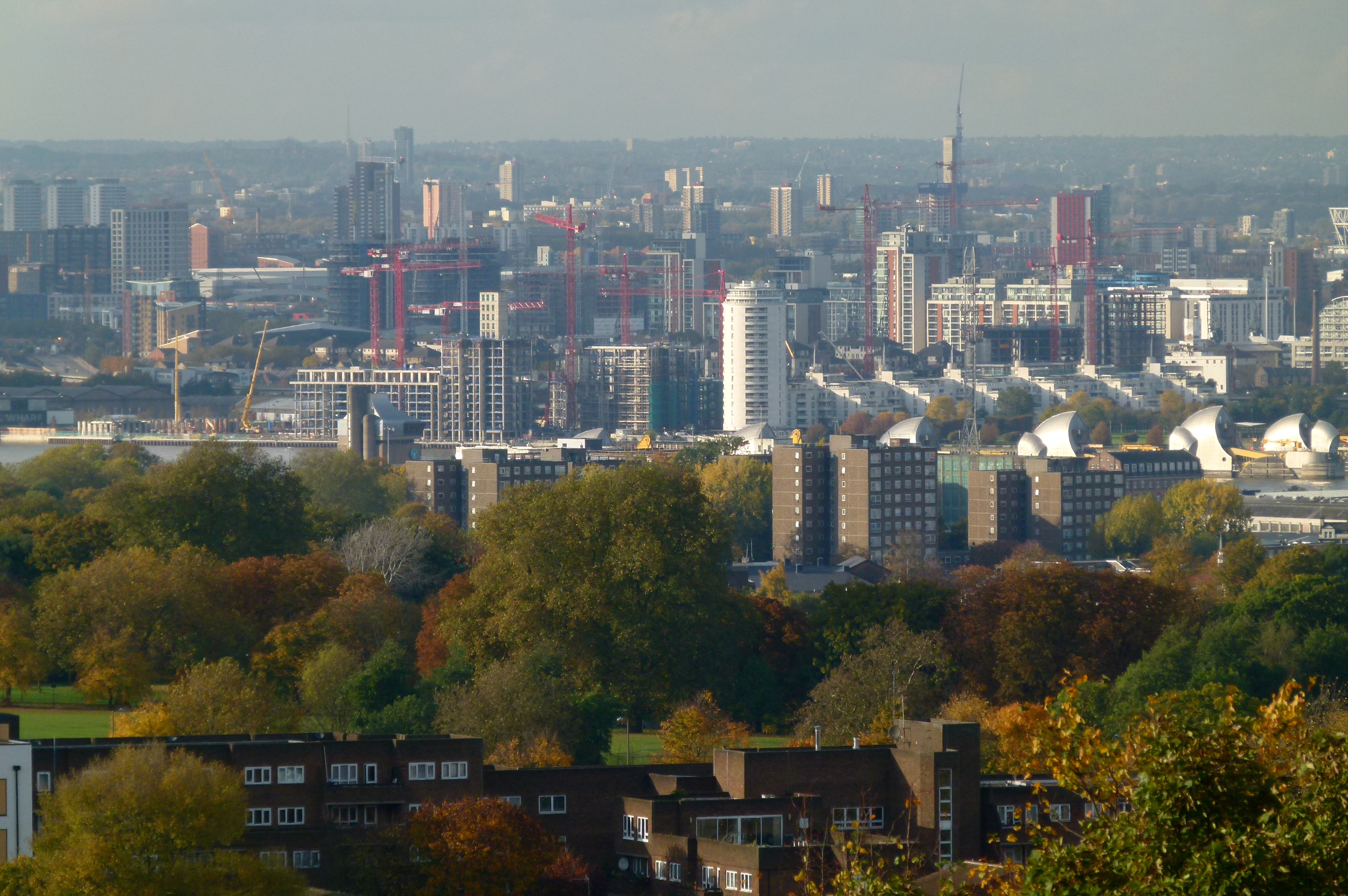
- View of Woolwich Common (from Shooter's Hill)
- Interactive map of Woolwich Common
- Type: common land, urban park
- Location: Woolwich, London
- Coordinates: 51.4765°N 0.0539°E
- Area: 60 hectares (150 acres)
- Status: military terrain (partly); conservation area
- Public transit: Woolwich Arsenal station

Woolwich Common is a common in Woolwich in southeast London, England. It is partly used as military land (less than 40%) and partly as an urban park. Woolwich Common is a conservation area. It is part of the South East London Green Chain. It is also the name of a street on the east side of the common, as well as an electoral ward of the Royal Borough of Greenwich. The population of the ward at the 2011 Census was 17,499.

== Location ==
Woolwich Common lies on the northern slope of Shooter's Hill, a 132 metres high hill in the Royal Borough of Greenwich, only a few hundred metres southwest of Woolwich town centre. It is bounded to the south side by the A207 Shooters Hill Road, although the open space continues south of this road in Oxleas Wood and Eltham Common. Academy Road (part of the A205 South Circular road) and the former Royal Military Academy form the eastern borders of the common. Repository Road and the Queen Elizabeth Hospital make up the western border. On the north side, Ha-ha Road separates the military section around the Royal Artillery Barracks from the public section. Pockets of green spaces that were once part of Woolwich Common but are now separated from the main body, remain at Green Hill and Repository Woods in the west, around Mulgrave Pond in the north and in Eaglesfield Park in the east.

== History ==
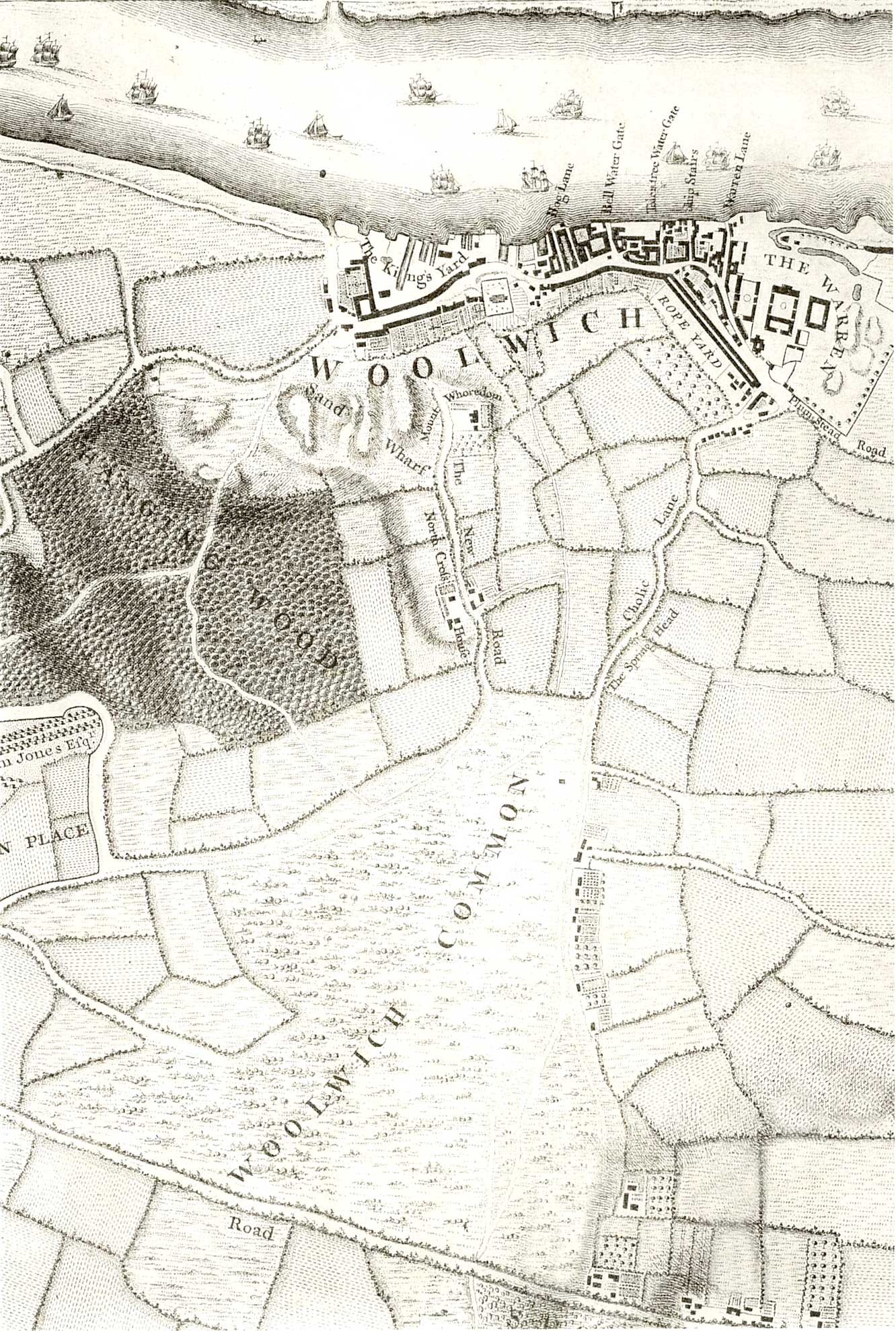
Woolwich Common in 1746

Until the mid-18th century, Woolwich Common formed part of an open space that was much bigger than it is now. It covered a large part of the north slope of Shooter's Hill, stretching west as far as Charlton (Charlton cemetery was laid out in 1855) and continuing east in what is now Shrewsbury Park, Plumstead Common and Winn's Common. The actual common was only about 80 acres and was used for grazing cattle and sheep, as well as digging peat and gathering wood and gorse for fuel. At this time it was contiguous with Charlton Common, a long hedge marking the boundary between the two (later the two merged and the name 'Woolwich Common' covered both areas). Until 1812, ownership of the common rested with the Crown (as it was deemed to be an appurtenance of the royal the manor of Eltham; when Eltham Palace was leased to Sir John Shaw, Bt in 1663, the common was included in the estate). Unlike most of Woolwich, it never became part of the Bowater estate.

=== Encroachments and enclosure ===
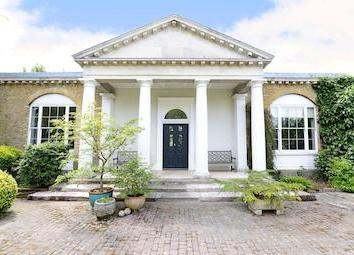
Gatehouse (1, Repository Road) built by the Board of Ordnance in 1806 at the western point of entry to the common.

Because of the rapid growth of both Woolwich Dockyard and the Royal Arsenal, local people were increasingly concerned about losing their ancient rights on the common. When parts of the common were privatized in the 18th century to build houses on, the Woolwich Vestry vigorously defended their customary rights against enclosure, and following the building of two houses on the eastern edge of the common around 1760, they succeeded in preventing the fourth Sir John Shaw from granting any further building leases.

By the 1720s the Board of Ordnance was using the Common as a testing ground for mortars, and fifty years later a firing range was set up for artillery practice. At the same time, it was still being used for the grazing of livestock; areas were cultivated for crops and other parts were quarried for gravel, to be used in road building.

In 1774-6 the character of the area changed significantly and lastingly with construction of the Royal Artillery Barracks to the north of the common. It was built by the Board of Ordnance on private land owned by the Bowater family, but a section of the common was also added to the construction site as a future parade ground and what is now Barrack Field. The site was largely unbuilt on; the only building was the Jolly Shipwrights inn near the current location of the Second Boer War Memorial. In 1777 Grand Depot Road was formed to give better access to the barracks. A ha-ha was built between Barrack Field and the common in 1778 (it was extended westwards in 1802 and then shifted southwards in 1806–08, bringing more of the common into Barrack Field).

By the end of the eighteenth century the common was being used for large military parades, manoeuvres and displays. Between 1796 and 1805 the Royal Military Academy (which had until then been located within the Arsenal) was rebuilt on a new site on the south-eastern edge of Woolwich Common, where it gradually expanded over the course of the next century; this was the first major building development by the Board of Ordnance on the common itself. In September 1801 additional land, to the west of Barrack Field, was leased by the Board of Ordnance from the Bowater family, largely to be used as military training ground (Green Hill and Repository Woods). Six months later the Board took outright possession of this (and all the land they had leased from the Bowater family) by virtue of an Act of Parliament.

Then, in 1803, the Board purchased the lease of Woolwich Common from Sir John Shaw (they would go on to acquire the freehold from the Crown, in 1812); In 1804 a local Commission, empowered by Act of Parliament to adjudicate in the matter, awarded £3,000 to the Parish in compensation for loss of rights to extract gravel (albeit without reference to parishioners' longstanding use of the common for herbage, estovers and turbary). That same year, the Board also purchased Charlton Common from Sir Thomas Maryon Wilson of Charlton House. Thenceforward all the land began to be cleared for military use; (as late as 1810 much of the western part of the common still consisted of cultivated fields, but in 1816 these were levelled and sowed to grass). Relations between the local inhabitants and the military remained acrimonious for more than a century afterwards, with the former continuing to claim rights of access based on custom while the latter asserted complete powers of ownership.

=== The common under military ownership ===
==== Artillery practice ====
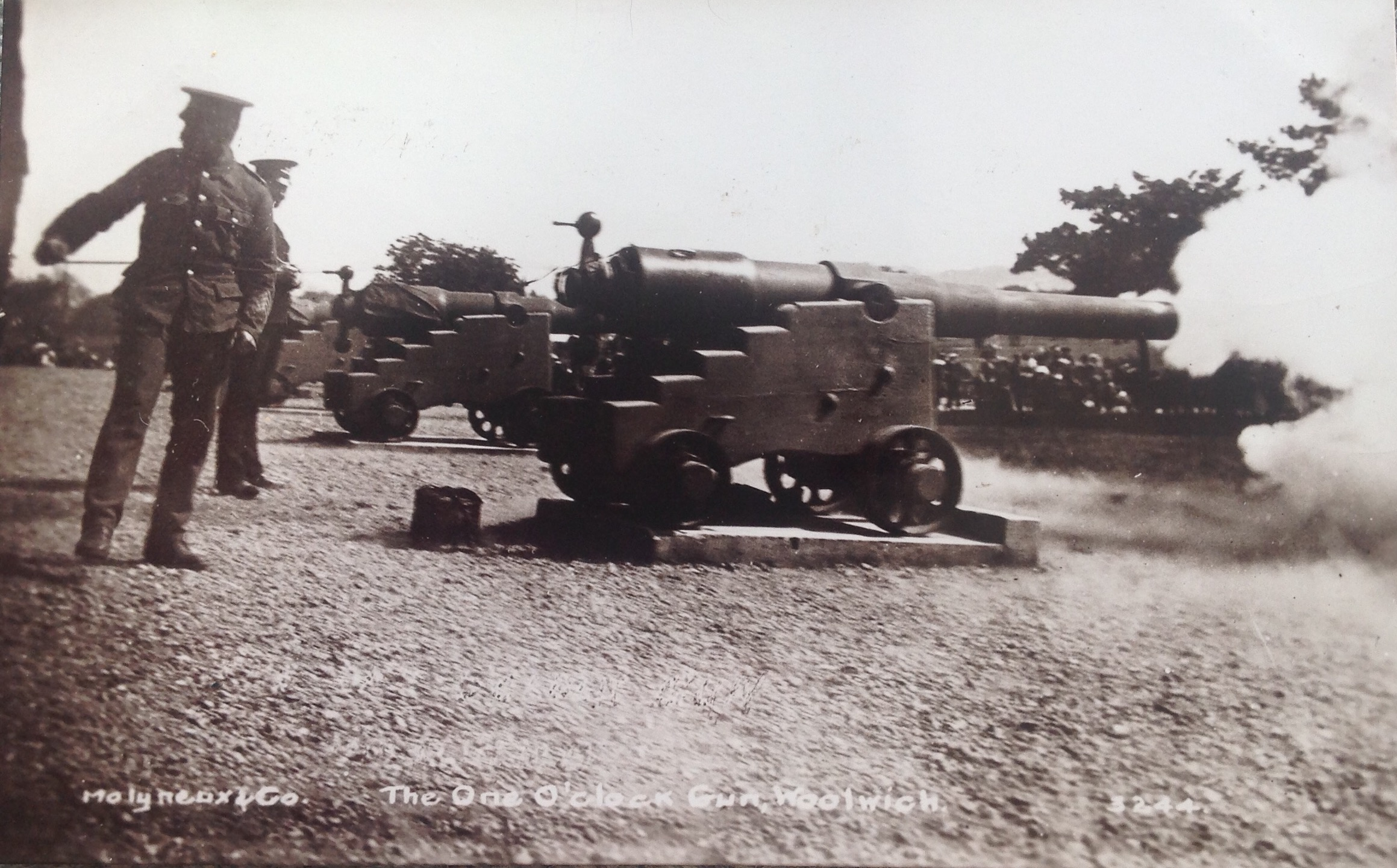
Firing of the 1 o'clock gun, Woolwich (RBL 40-pounder gun)

In 1803 the Board built a mortar battery on Green Hill, just west of the barracks, for artillery training. It was orientated to fire southwards, the target being a flagstaff positioned (between 850 yards (780 m) and 1,250 yards (1,140 m) away) on the far southern edge of the common; this necessitated the removal of a large part of the boundary hedge between Woolwich Common and Charlton Common. In 1847, mortar and howitzer practice took place at the battery 'every Monday, Wednesday and Friday [from] as early as half past nine in the morning'. Behind the battery was a drill yard, and a pedimented building (dating from 1830) which provided storage and office space and accommodation for a sergeant. Positions for six guns were also provided; these were used as a saluting battery. Use of the common for mortar practice came to an end in around 1873, when artillery training moved to Shoeburyness; but the saluting battery remained in operation in the 20th century.

==== Horses and the Army Veterinary Corps ====
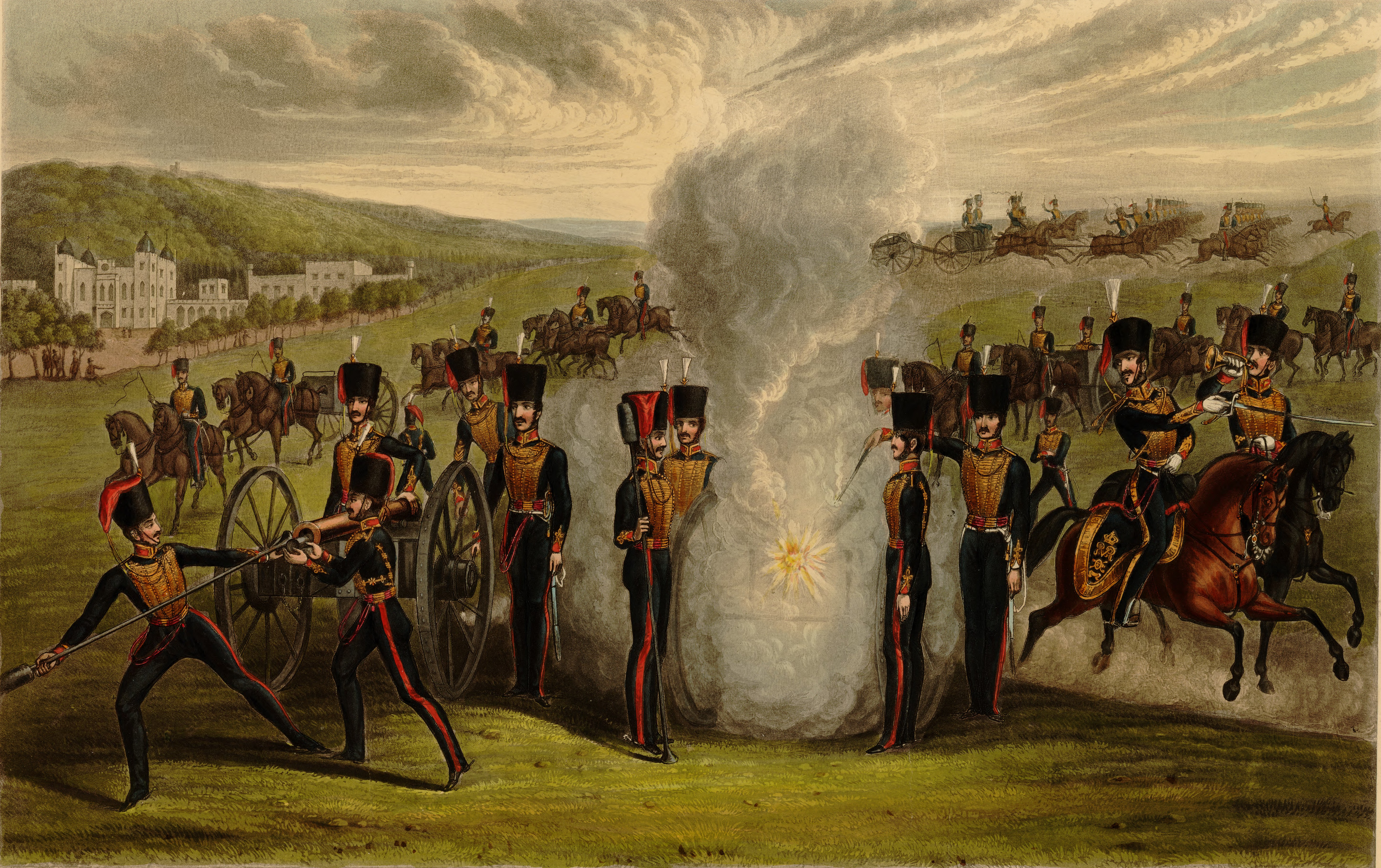
Royal Horse Artillery on Woolwich Common, 1843

From early on the common was used to train and exercise military horses, including those of the Royal Horse Artillery (which was based in the Artillery Barracks). By 1804 a 'Veterinary Establishment' had been built on the western edge of the Common; it later expanded to become the Royal Horse Infirmary. The Royal Horse Infirmary became the headquarters of the Army Veterinary Department from its inception in 1859, and the Principal Veterinary Surgeon (PVS) was quartered here (until moving to the War Office in 1876).

Immediately to the north of the Royal Horse Infirmary, a 'permanent Camp of Huts' was erected in the 1850s, which remained occupied by Artillery and other troops through the second half of the century; further to the south were several sets of stables. In 1896 Shrapnel Barracks was built alongside, which provided accommodation for two field-batteries of Artillery. During the First World War the barracks served as No 1 (Eastern) Cavalry Depot, before reverting after the war once more to house a field brigade of Artillery. During and after the Second World War it continued to house Artillery units, and later provided accommodation for the Women's Royal Army Corps; Shrapnel Barracks was demolished in the late 1960s (Queen Elizabeth Hospital now stands on the site).

Immediately to the north of the barracks a Remount Depot was built in 1887, the year the Army Remount Service was established (previously, individual cavalry regiments had been responsible for purchasing and training their own horses). Earlier, a smaller 'Royal Artillery and Royal Engineers Remount Establishment' had been set up nearby to cover the needs of those units; the new depot continued to focus on providing horses for the Artillery and Engineers, while also providing remounts for the Army Service Corps, which had its main Horse Transport Depot (successor to the Military Train) at Woolwich, in Connaught Barracks on the other side of the common.

After serious failings in the Second Boer War, the army sought to improve (among other things) its veterinary services. In 1903 a committee of inquiry recommended the establishment of two new Station Veterinary Hospitals (one at Woolwich, the other at Aldershot), with Woolwich designated as the Corps depot of a new Army Veterinary Corps. The new veterinary hospital was set up in what had been the Remount Depot; the Remount Depot meanwhile moved into the old Horse Infirmary. Woolwich was also the main designated location for army veterinary stores, to which end a large mobilization and reserve store was constructed (just south of the Rotunda) in 1907. The RAVC depot remained at Woolwich until 1939.

==== Housing and hospitals ====
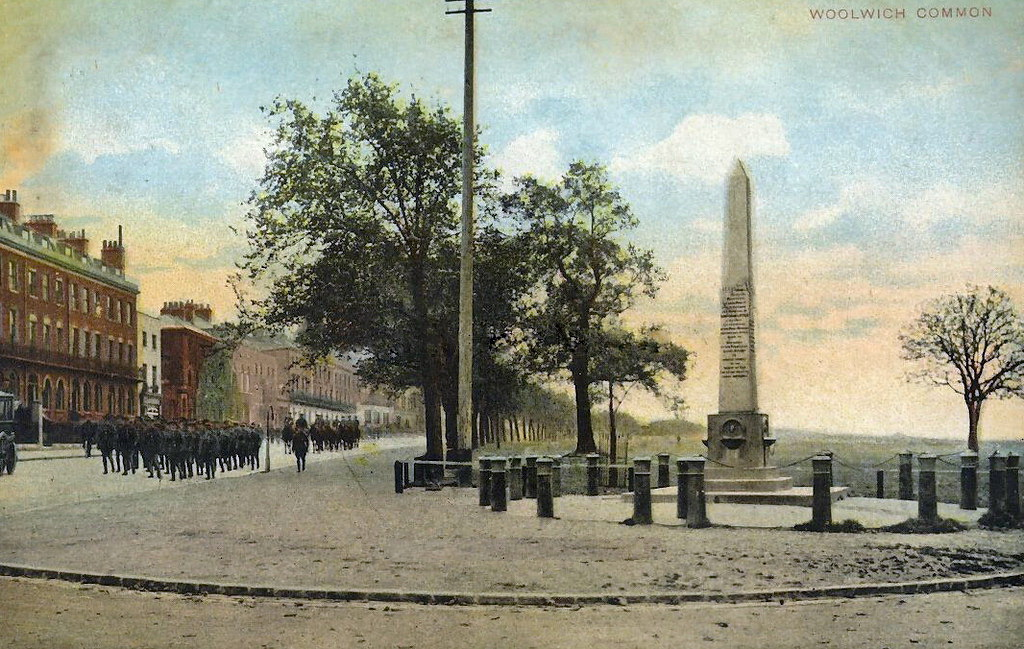
Victorian houses along the common and Major Little fountain, c. 1900

In the 1730s only twenty modest houses stood along the east side of the common (in 1763 there were about thirty, of which seven stood empty); but from the 1780s on, large houses for military officers began to replace these cottages. One of the largest, Cube House, was built by Charles Hutton, professor of mathematics at the Royal Military Academy, in 1792; he had bought a parcel of land at the southern end as a speculative venture, and went on to build a number of large houses on the site. In 1804–5, the new Royal Military Academy having been built just across the road, the Crown purchased Hutton's land; Cube House was converted into a hospital for the cadets (it was later rebuilt to house the Governor of the RMA), and several other houses were adapted for use by other senior officers of the Academy. Other grand developments on this side of the common included the villas Belmont Place (1840), Clarence Place (rebuilt after a fire in 1840), Adelaide Place and Belle Vue, as well as Queen's Terrace (1830) and Kempt Terrace (1832/1850). General Gordon was born at Kempt Terrace, 29 Woolwich Common, in 1833. Between 1972 and 1975 all of this was demolished after a long and bitter conservation battle to make room for social housing (Woolwich Common Estate).

Housing of a rather different sort was to be found on the western side of the common, where in the early 19th century long rows of 'mud huts' had been built by married soldiers for their families; these were interfering with the artillery exercises, so in 1812 the Board replaced them with new married quarters south of the road to Charlton: they were single rooms, built back-to-back in fifty pairs. Later named the Duke of York's Cottages (but still referred to disparagingly by contemporaries as 'the Huts'), they were demolished in the late 1870s after an outbreak of diphtheria. The Remount Depot was built on the site.

In the 19th and 20th centuries a series of military and civilian hospitals and related institutions were built on the south side of the common, on either side of Shooters Hill Road, including the groundbreaking Royal Herbert Hospital in 1865, Brook Fever Hospital in 1896, Victoria House (providing facilities for the Royal Army Medical Corps) in 1909, and the Woolwich and District War Memorial Hospital in 1927. In 1977 the Royal Herbert Hospital was replaced by the Queen Elizabeth Military Hospital (which was built on the southwest side of the common where the Shrapnel Barracks had previously stood); it closed in 1995, but was then reopened as a civilian hospital (following the closure of Brook General) in 2006.

==== Large-scale events ====
Plenty of space was available for large-scale military events. As early as 1788 a parade took place on the common at the request of King George III. King William IV inspected the gathered forces of the Royal Artillery and Royal Engineers on the common in 1830, and returned again five years later when 3,000 troops were assembled for a review (involving manoeuvres undertaken by "large bodies of horse, foot and artillery") watched by "an immense assemblage of spectators". Several other royal reviews took place through the nineteenth century, and on into the twentieth, and military displays took place for the benefit of foreign dignitaries and others. In 1919 an open-air service took place on the common to celebrate the signing of the Treaty of Versailles; and a memorial service on the common the following year attracted a crowd of 50,000 people. Later, Royal Artillery "At Home" events took place on the common for members of the public, but in the 1970s these were discontinued because of the IRA terrorist threat.

==== Later developments ====
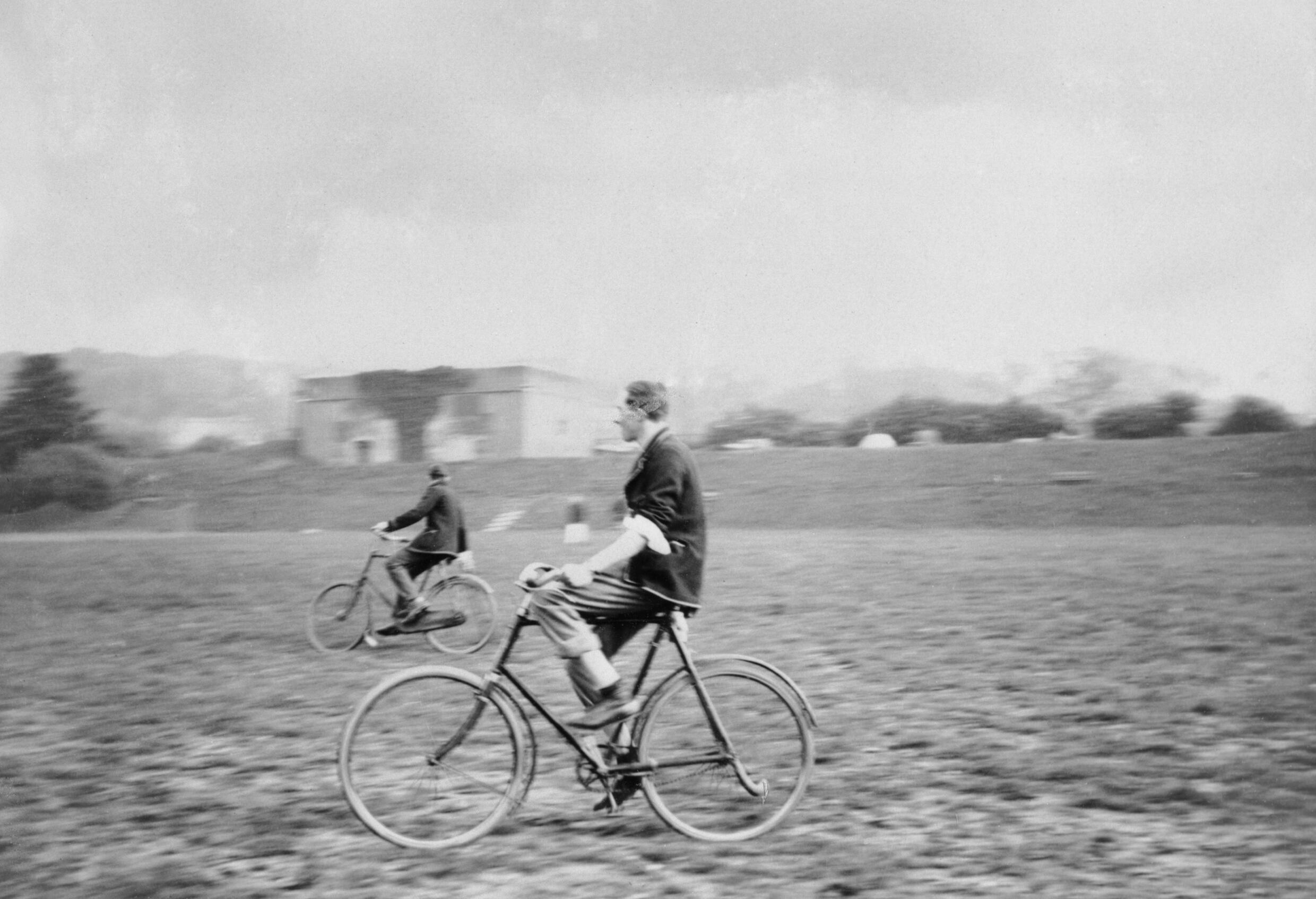
Officers playing polo on bicycles on Woolwich Common around 1910

At the start of the First World War, the common was used as a temporary camp for volunteer units preparing to travel to the front, and as an assembly space for artillery trains.

In 1916 the Signals Experimental Establishment moved on to the common (setting itself up in a collection of huts just south of Ha-ha Road) where they worked on early developments in field telephony and inter-aircraft communication; over the next quarter-century the facility was expanded and rebuilt, until the SEE moved to Dorset in 1943. Six years later the Atomic Weapons Research Establishment took over the site, which became a laboratory to develop, test and manufacture components for Britain's first nuclear weapons. In the early 1950s the on-site workforce quickly grew from 155 to 487; the facility was closed in 1964 (its surviving buildings were removed in 2011 to allow the King's Troop RHA to ride out on to the common from their new barracks across the road).

In World War II the area was heavily bombed because of the military presence and the existence of an anti-aircraft battery on the common. After the war, up till the late 20th century, the common was still used for horse training, shooting exercises and other military activities; however the size of Woolwich Garrison was drastically reduced over this period. In the 1960s, consolidation of the military estate saw much demolition, but also building (e.g. of new married quarters on the southern and eastern edges of the common).

By the early 21st century it was only occasionally still possible to see soldiers from the Royal Artillery Barracks training on the common; but in 2012 the King's Troop, Royal Horse Artillery moved to a new headquarters (King George VI Lines) on the Napier Lines site, since when horse artillery training on the common has resumed.

In 2016 the Ministry of Defence announced its intention to withdraw all military personnel from Woolwich by 2028; however in 2020 these plans were revised with a view to retaining Napier Lines as the long-term home of The King’s Troop Royal Horse Artillery.

== Nature and leisure ==
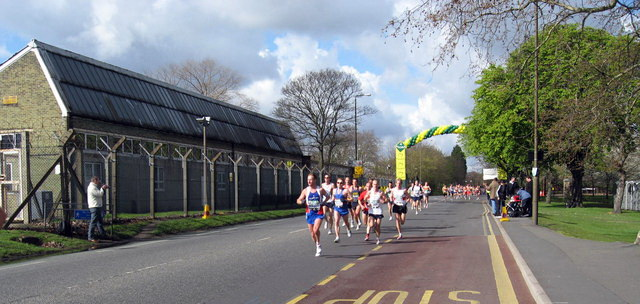
The 2008 London Marathon on Ha-Ha Road

Since the early 18th century Woolwich Common, more specifically Barrack Field, has been used as a cricket field, initially by Woolwich Cricket Club, since the early 19th century by the Royal Artillery Cricket Club, which until the mid-20th century only admitted officers. Also in the 19th century, horseraces were held on Woolwich Common. The common was also used for football and other sports. From 1920 until around 1960 a stadium existed on the common.

During the 2012 Summer Olympics shooting took place at Barrack Field. The London Marathon passes over Woolwich Common.

These days, except for Barrack Field which is still used for sports, the common is mainly used for jogging and dog walking. In September, the Woolwich Common Funfair takes possession of a section of the common.

A ha-ha still separates Barrack Field, the military section owned by the Ministry of Defence, from the remainder of the common, which is now overseen by Greenwich London Borough Council.

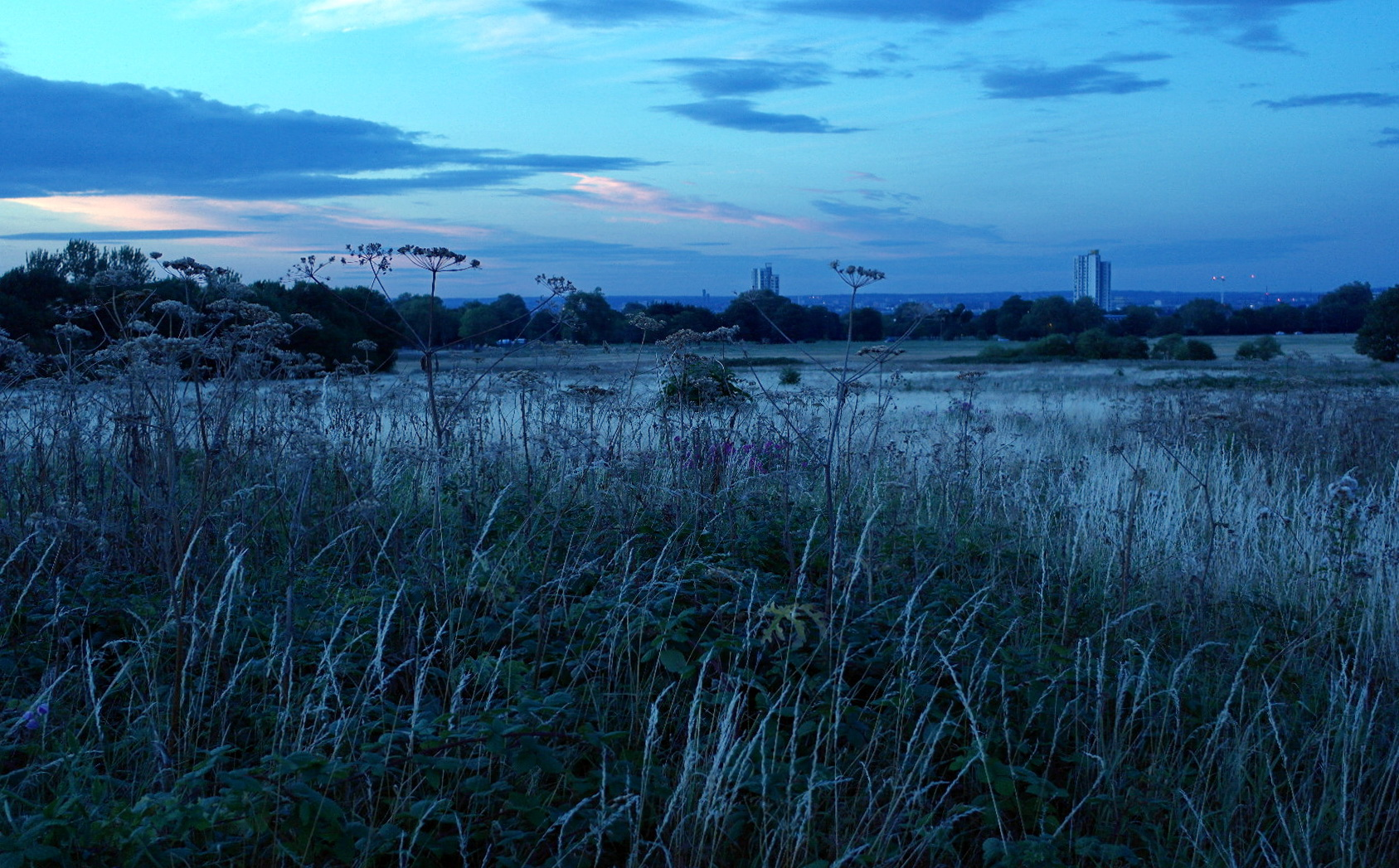
Evening view

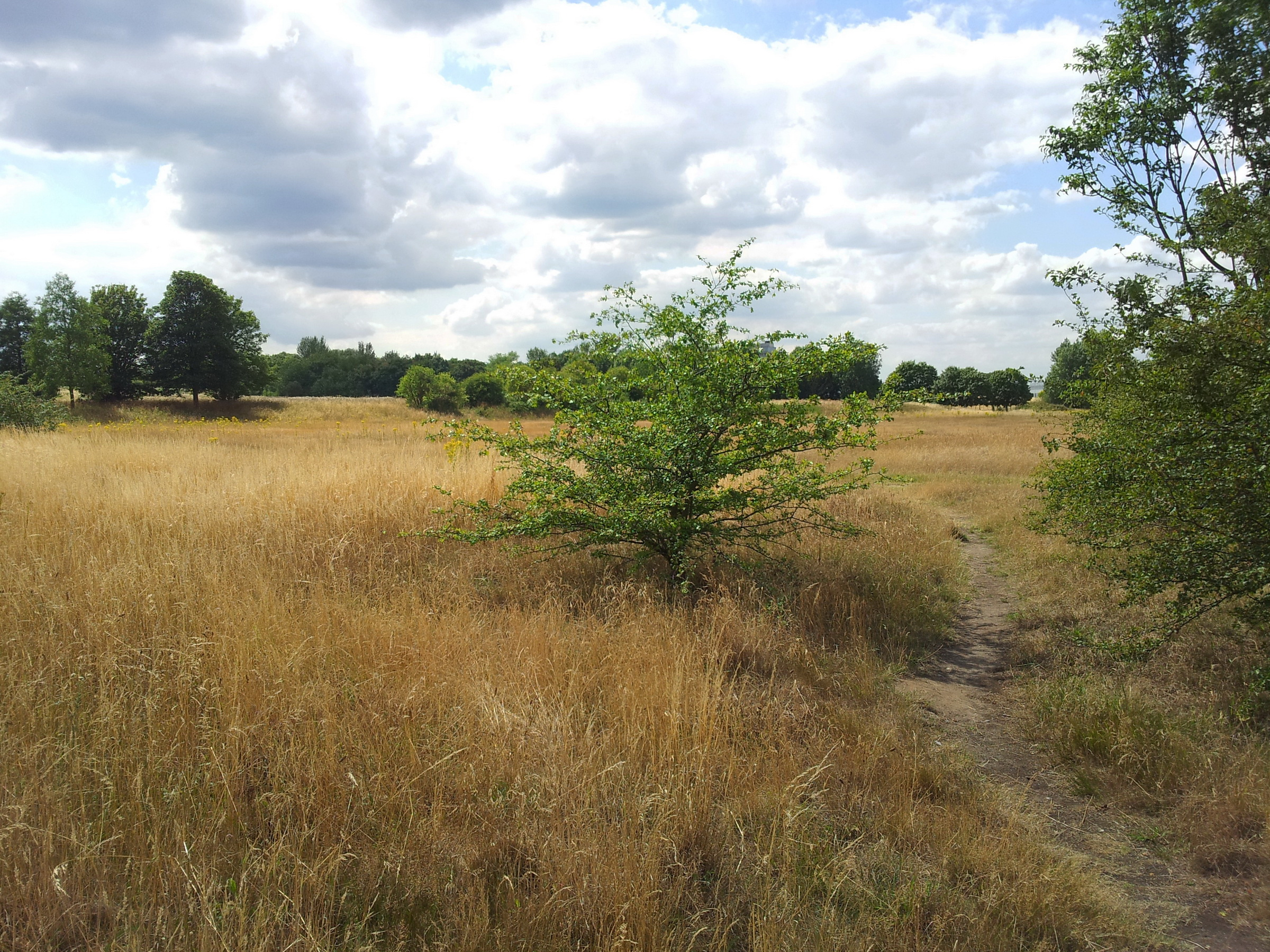
Natural area

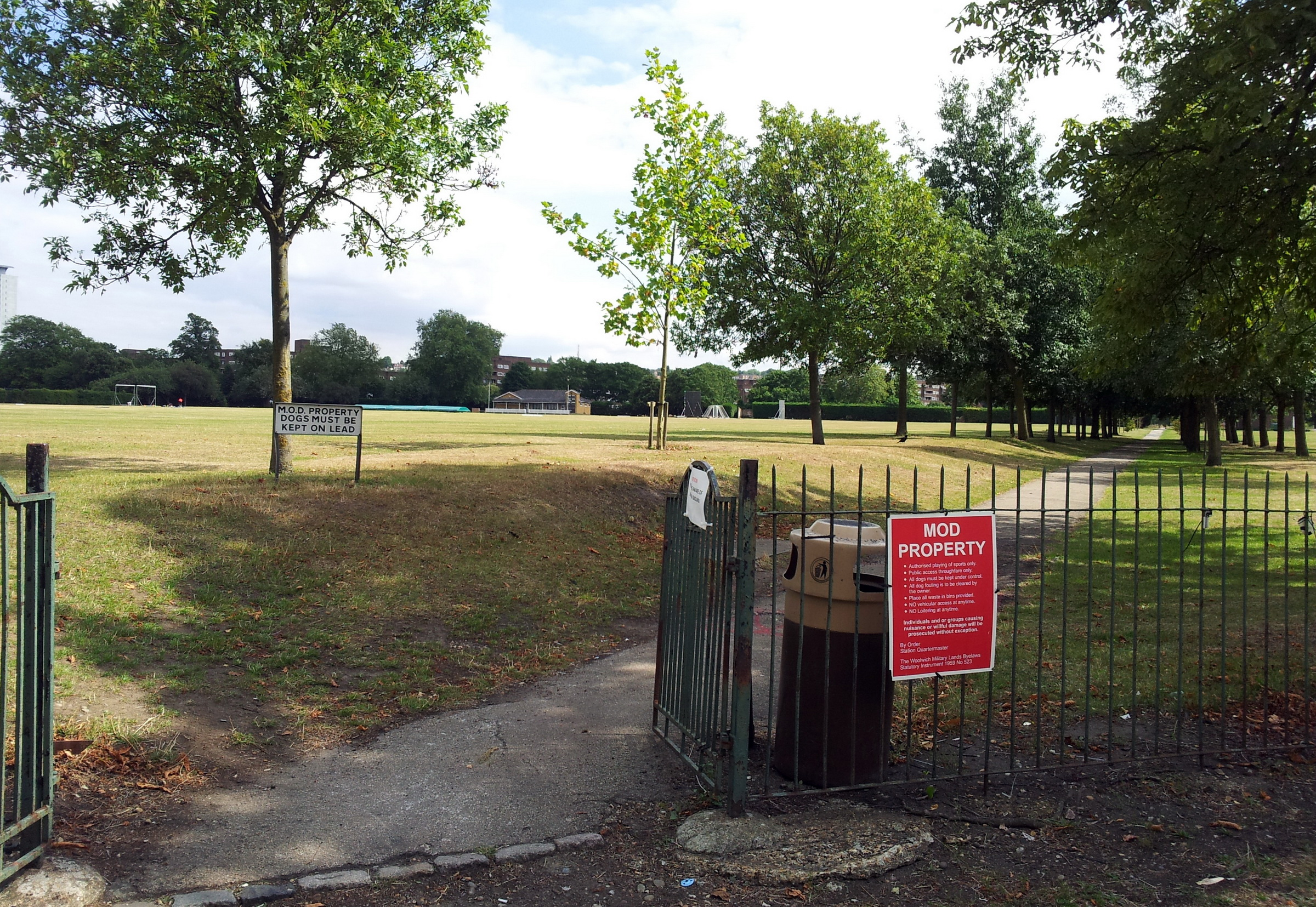
Barrack Field with public access path

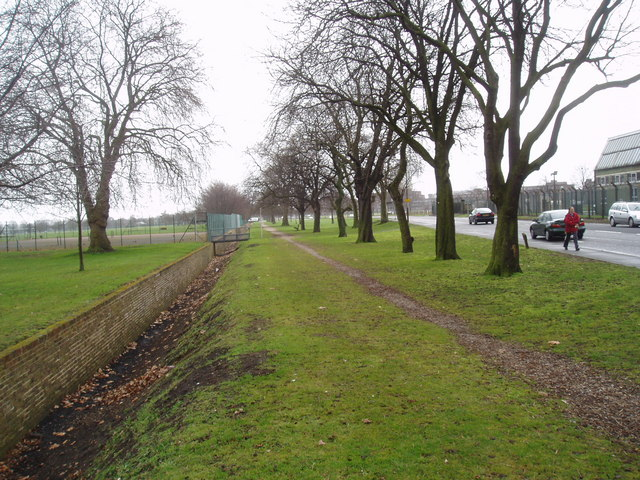
Ha-ha along Barrack Field

== Cultural heritage ==
=== Heritage buildings, north end ===
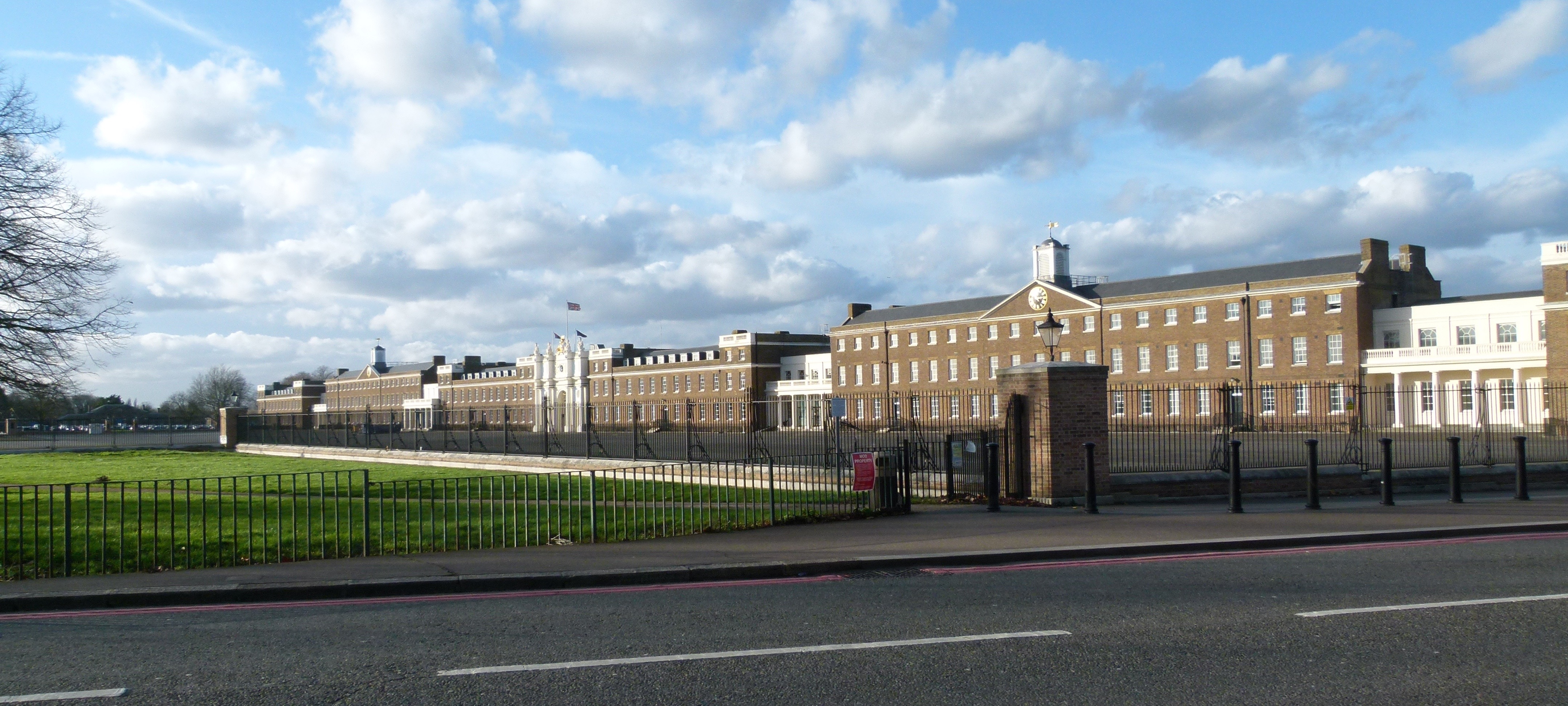
Royal Artillery Barracks and Barrack Field

The Neoclassical façade of the Royal Artillery Barracks (James Wyatt, 1776–1802) is the longest façade in London, stretching along the north end of the common. Across the road, Government House (1781) was the quarters of the Garrison Commandant from 1855 to 1995 and is the only remaining grand house overlooking the common. Of the nearby Garrison Church of St George only the shell remains after it was bombed in 1944. Its Neo-Romanesque architecture and remnants of mosaics are still impressive. Situated on the northwest side of the common are Napier Lines Barracks (not listed), Green Hill Barracks and Military School, and the Rotunda. John Nash's round brick building with a leaded tent roof began life as a display space in St. James's Park during the peace celebrations in 1814 and was re-erected in Woolwich between 1819 and 1822 "to be appropriated to the conservation of the trophies obtained in the last war, the artillery models, and other military curiosities". Until 2001 it housed the Royal Artillery Museum and now serves as a boxing ring for the King's Troop, Royal Horse Artillery in nearby George VI Lines Barracks.

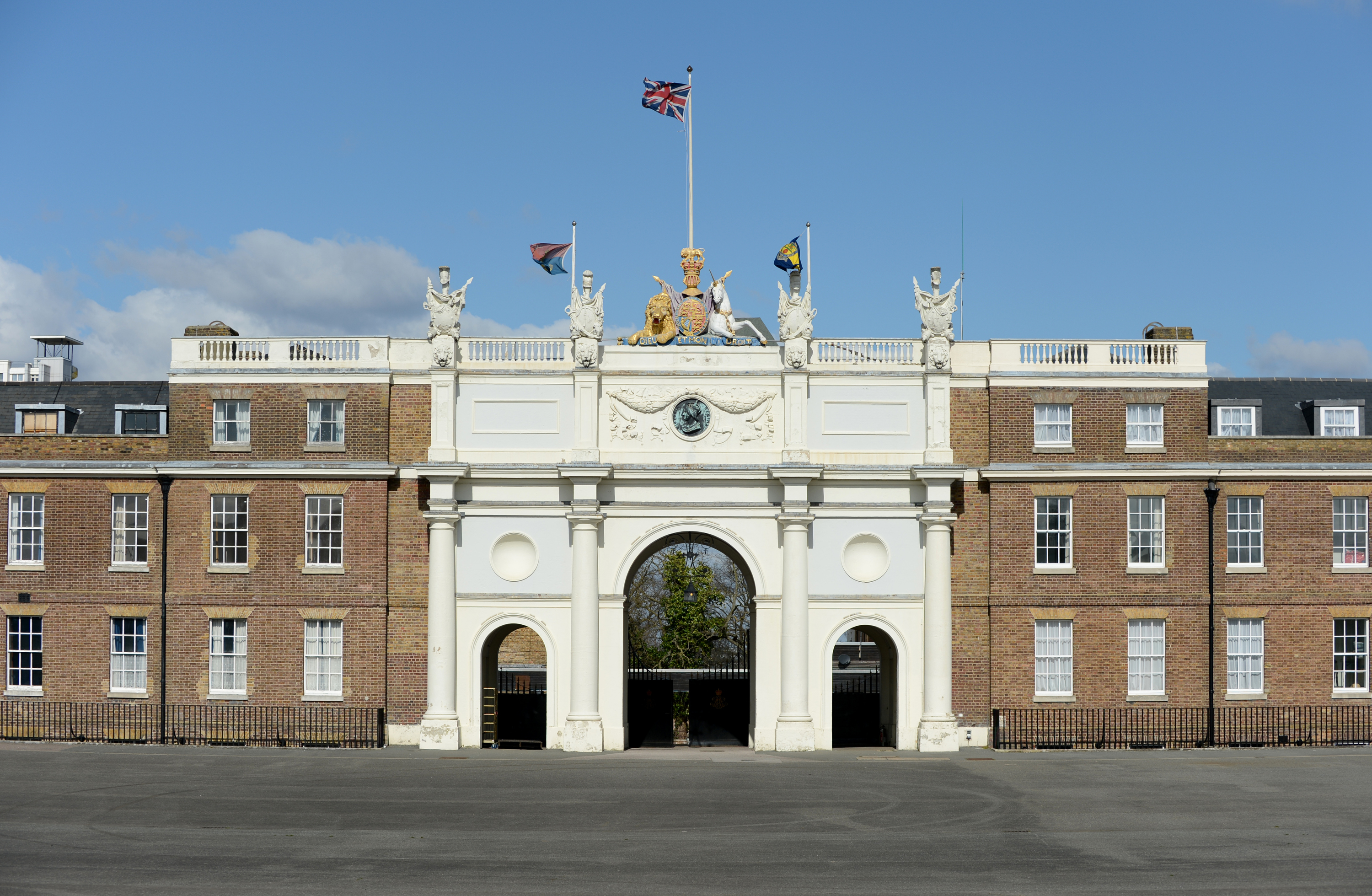
Royal Artillery Barracks

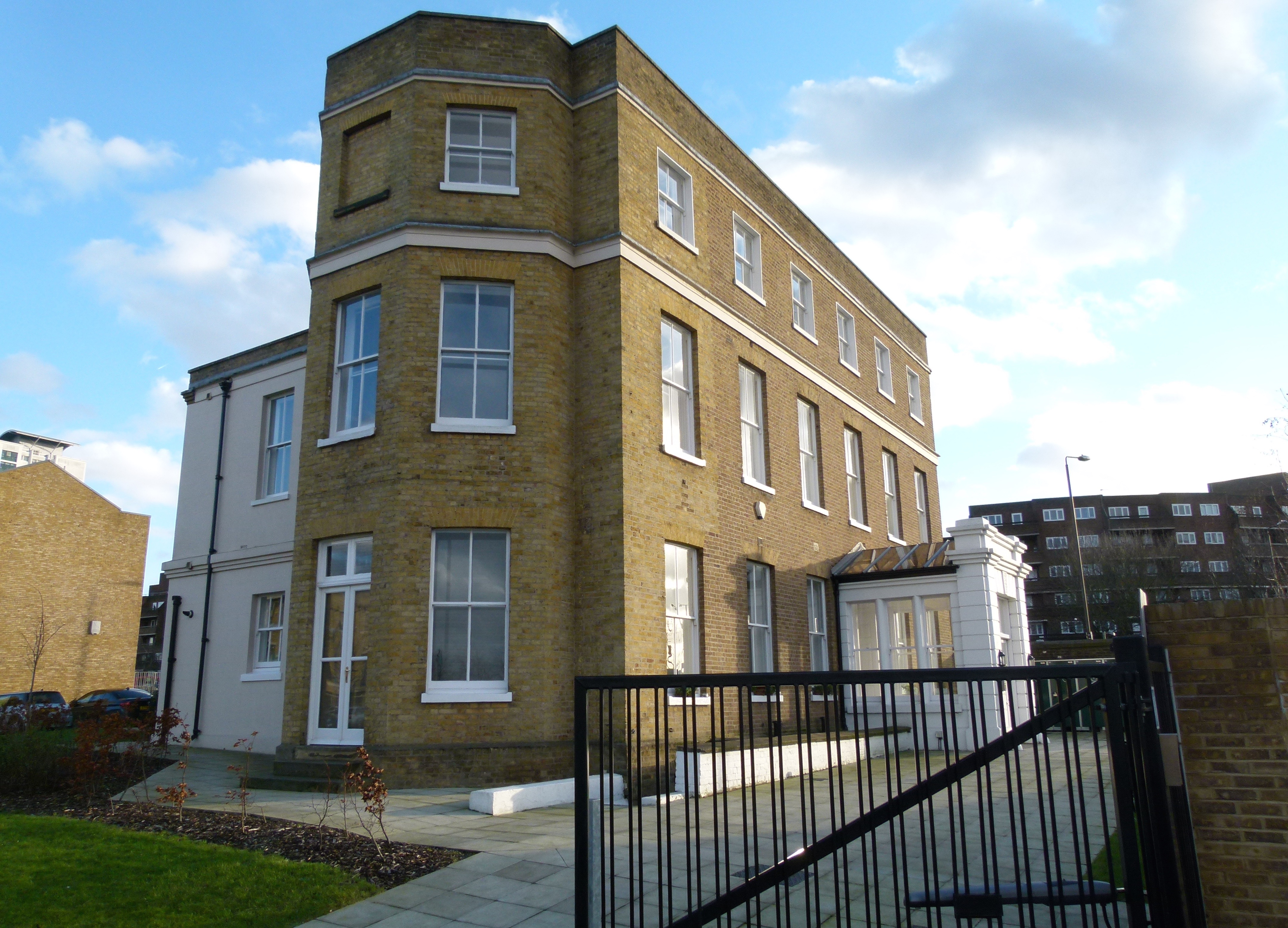
Government House

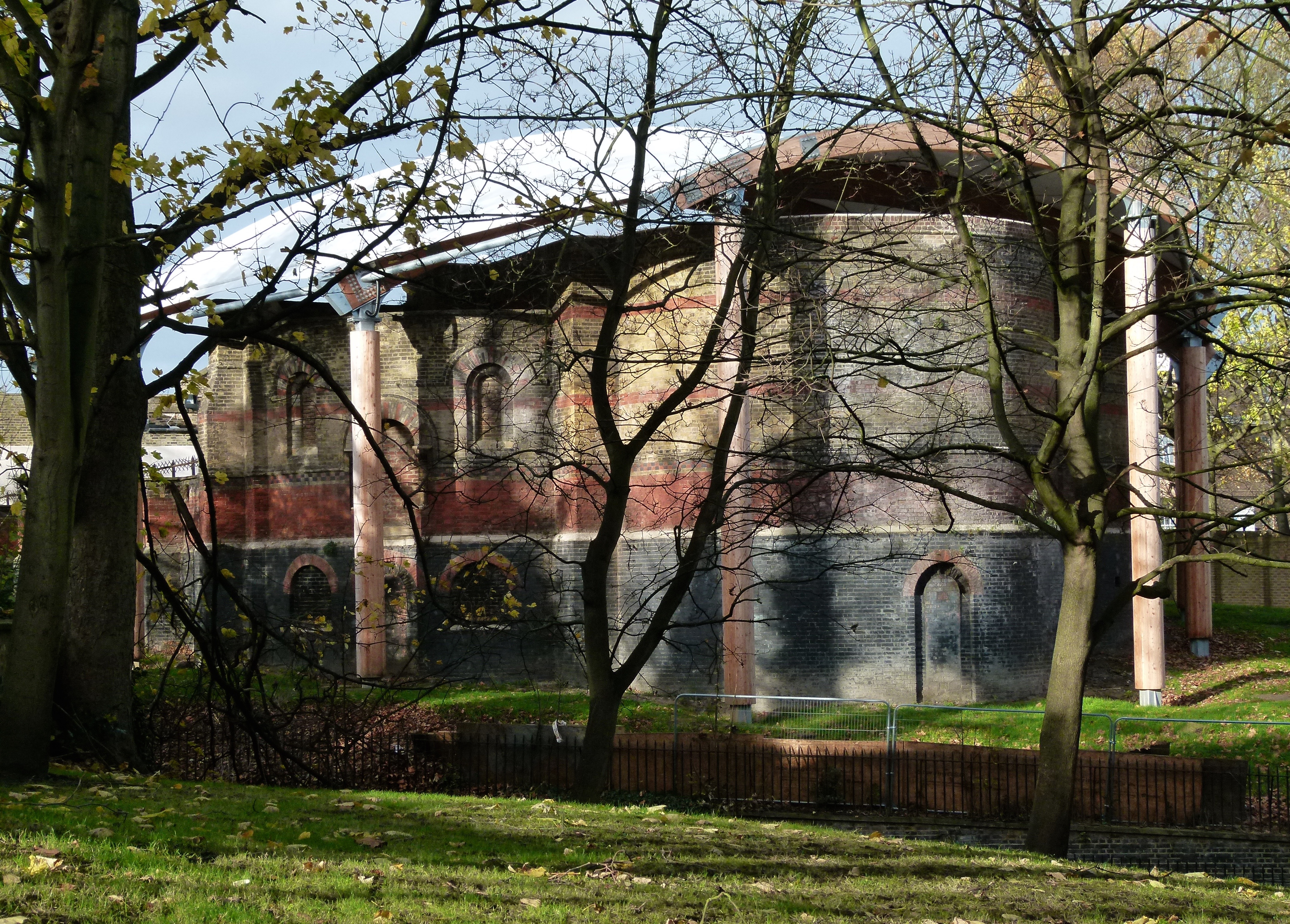
Ruined Garrison Church

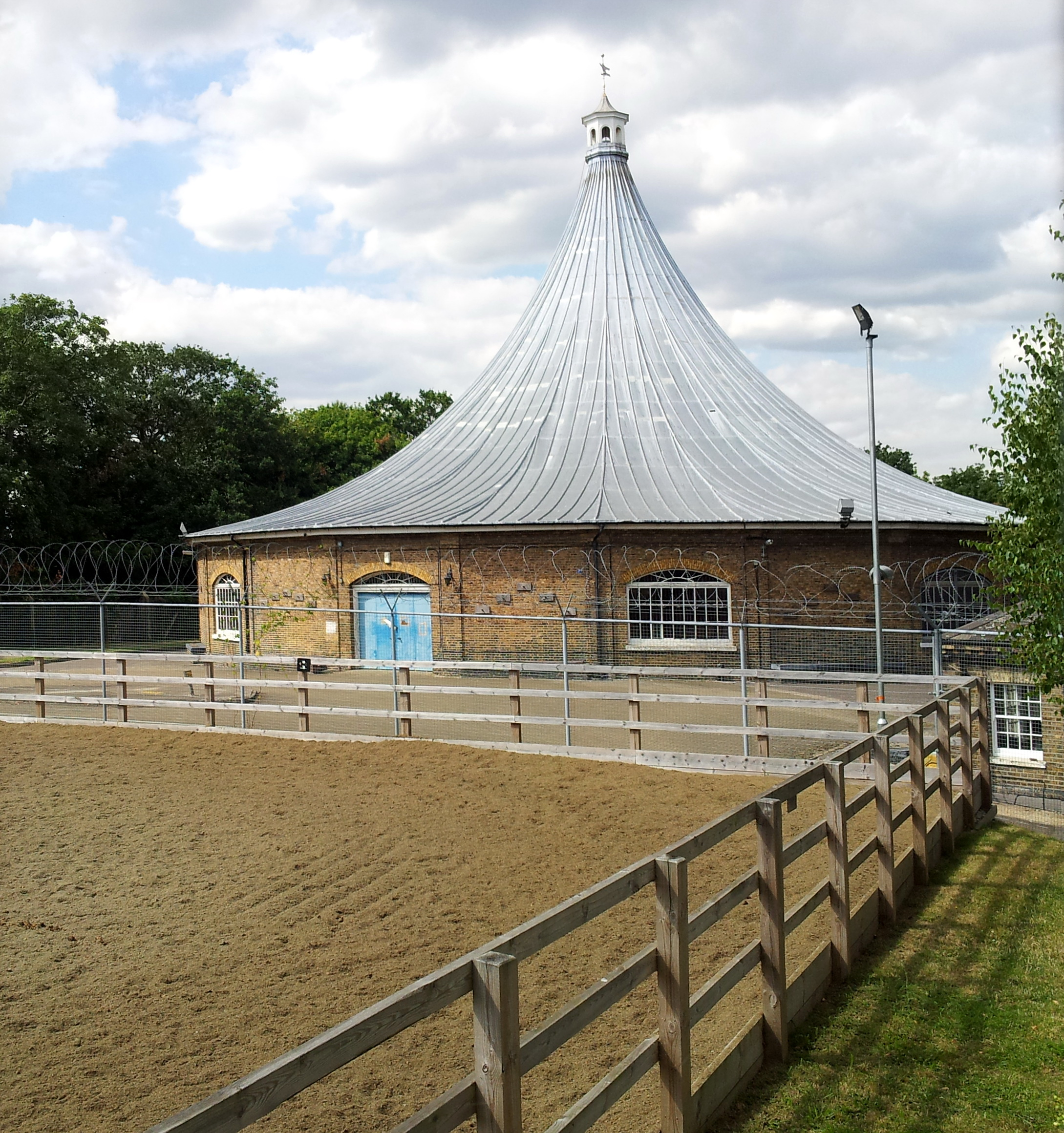
John Nash's Rotunda

=== Heritage buildings, south end ===
The Royal Military Academy at the south end of Woolwich Common almost mirrors the Royal Artillery Barracks at the north end. It has an almost equally long façade in Mock Tudor style and the oldest parts of the building were also designed by James Wyatt. Other military buildings that survived on this side of the common are the Royal Herbert Hospital and Victoria House, both on Shooters Hill. All three buildings have been, or currently are being converted for residential use.

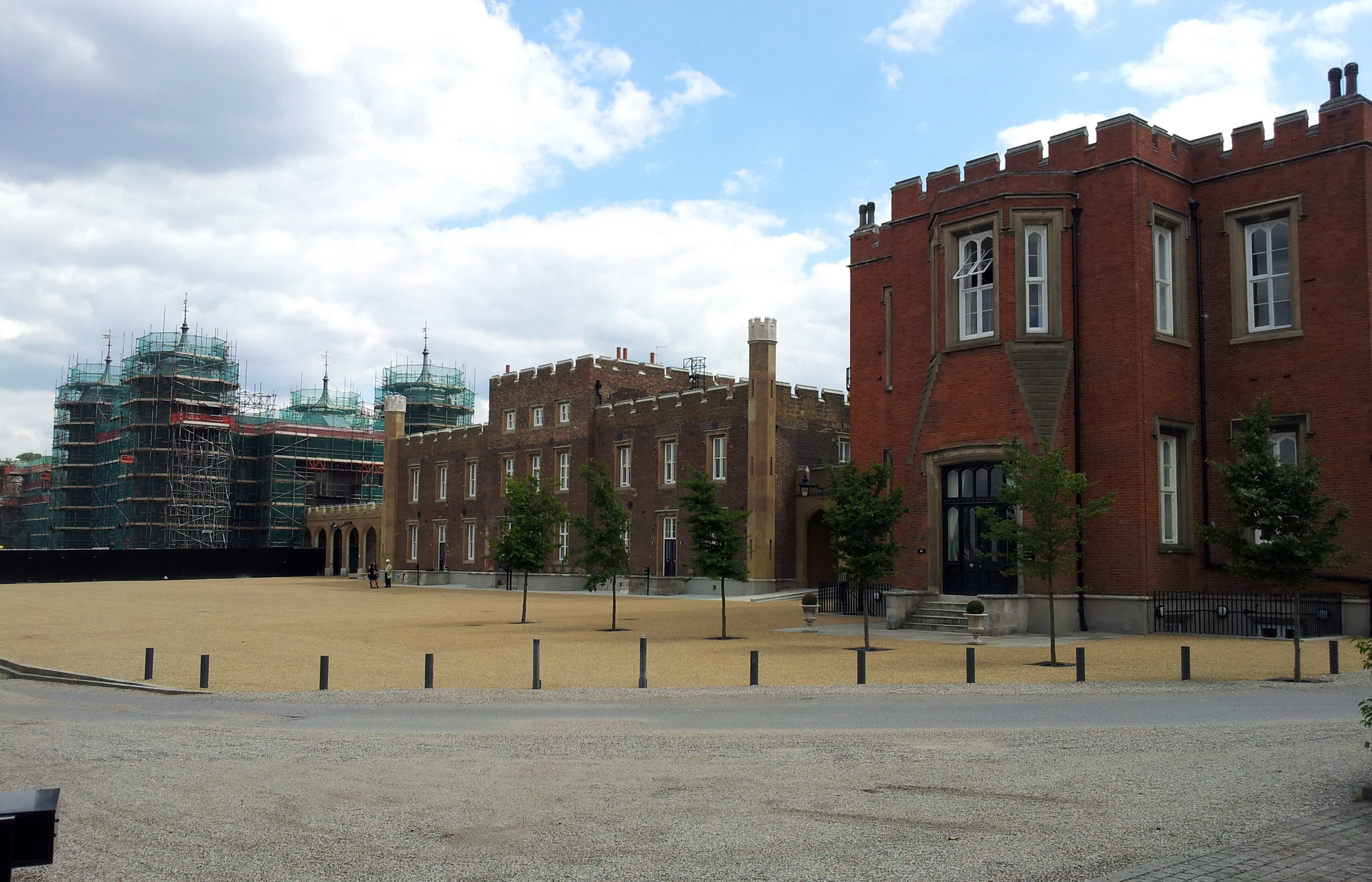
Royal Military Academy

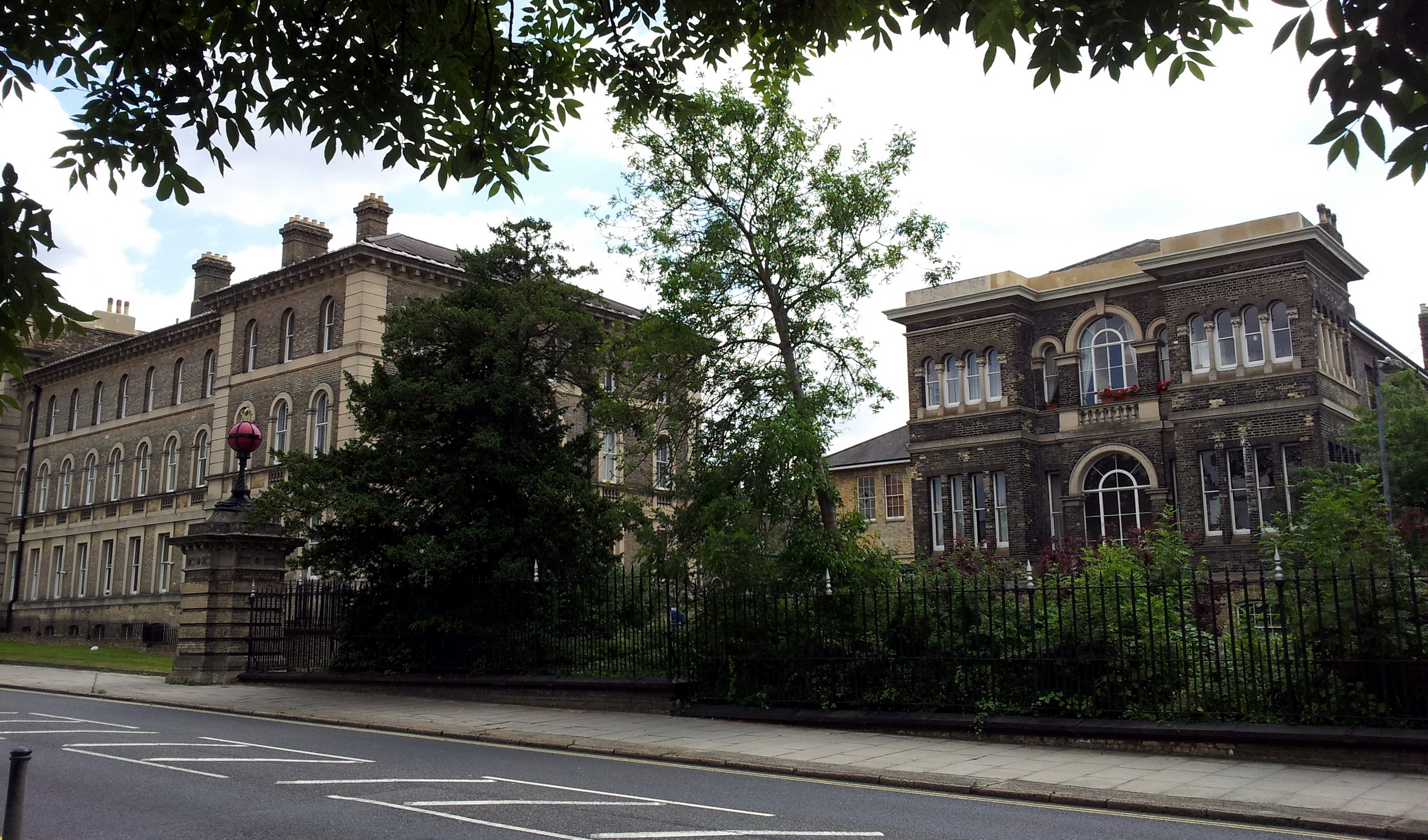
Royal Herbert Hospital

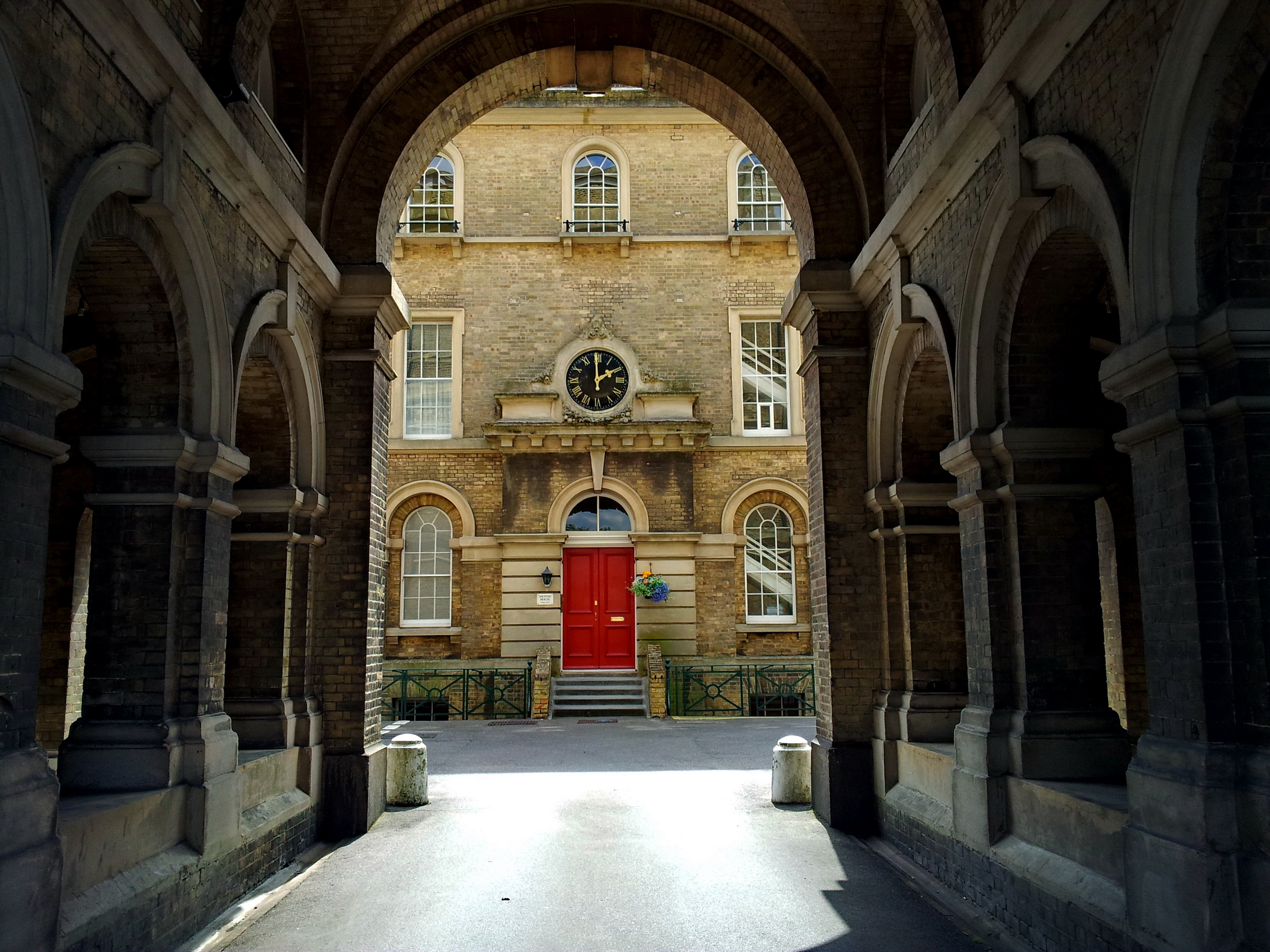
Detail Herbert Hospital

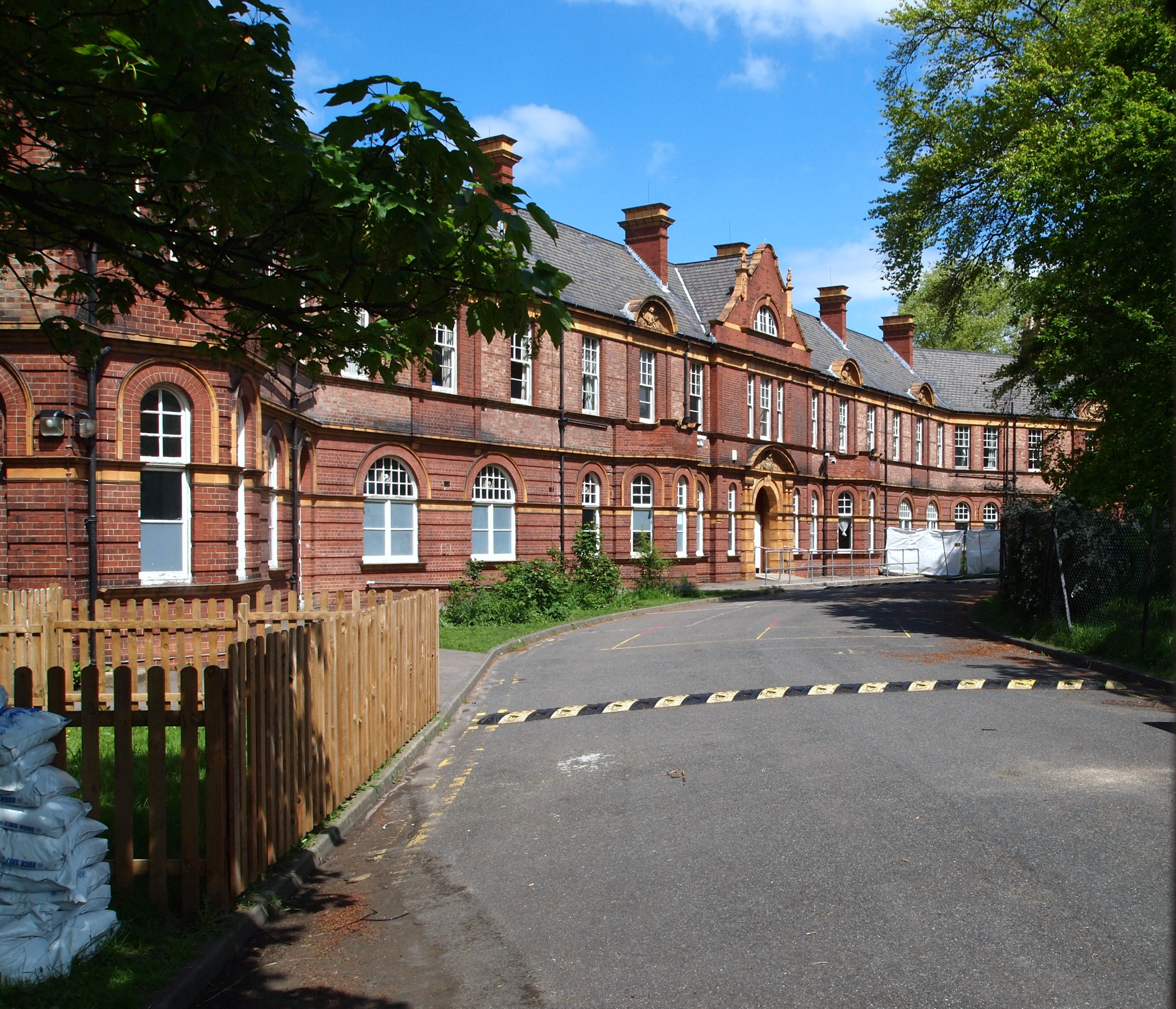
Victoria House

=== Monuments ===
Situated on the south end of the parade ground of the Royal Artillery Barracks is the Crimean War Memorial by John Bell (1861). The bronze statue of a woman ("Honour") distributing laurel wreaths was entirely cast from Russian cannons captured at Sebastopol. On the east side of the common, along Woolwich New Road, two memorials in the shape of obelisks draw attention. The Major Little Memorial, originally a drinking fountain, dates from 1863. It is accompanied by a 19th-century drinking fountain for horses. The Second Boer War Memorial dates from around 1902. Along Repository Road several historic cannons are on display, although others were removed when the Royal Artillery left Woolwich in 2007.

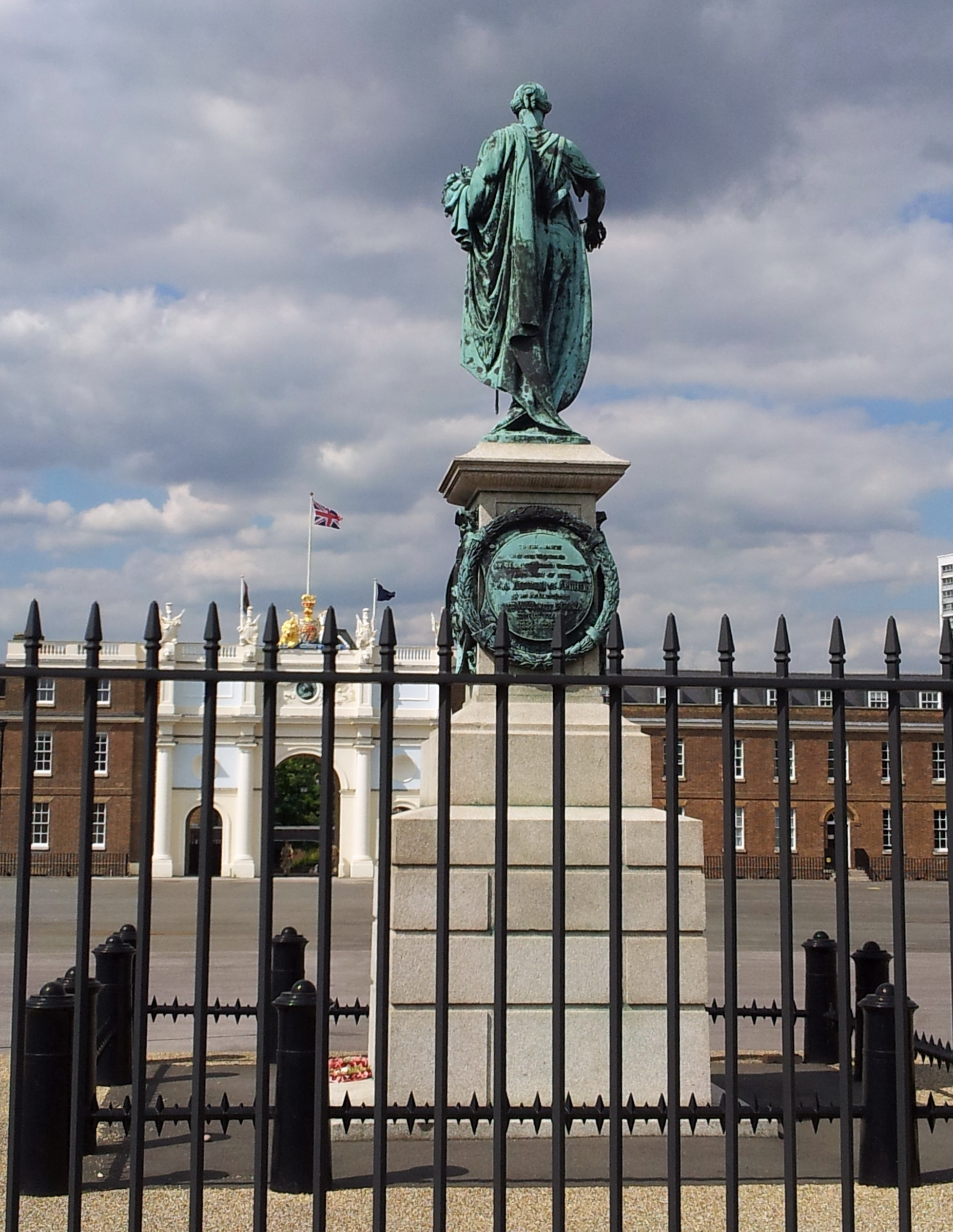
Crimean War Memorial

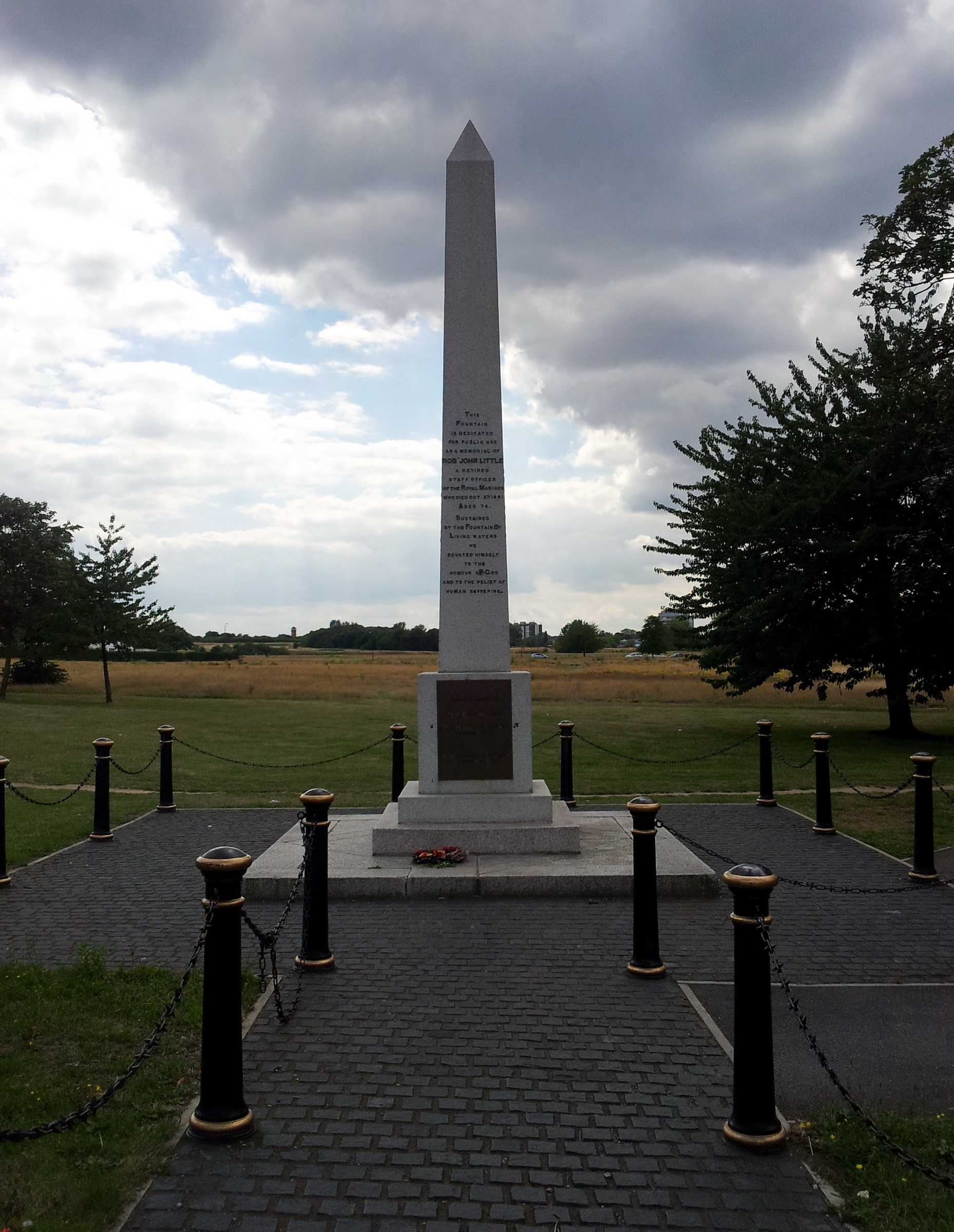
Major Little Obelisk

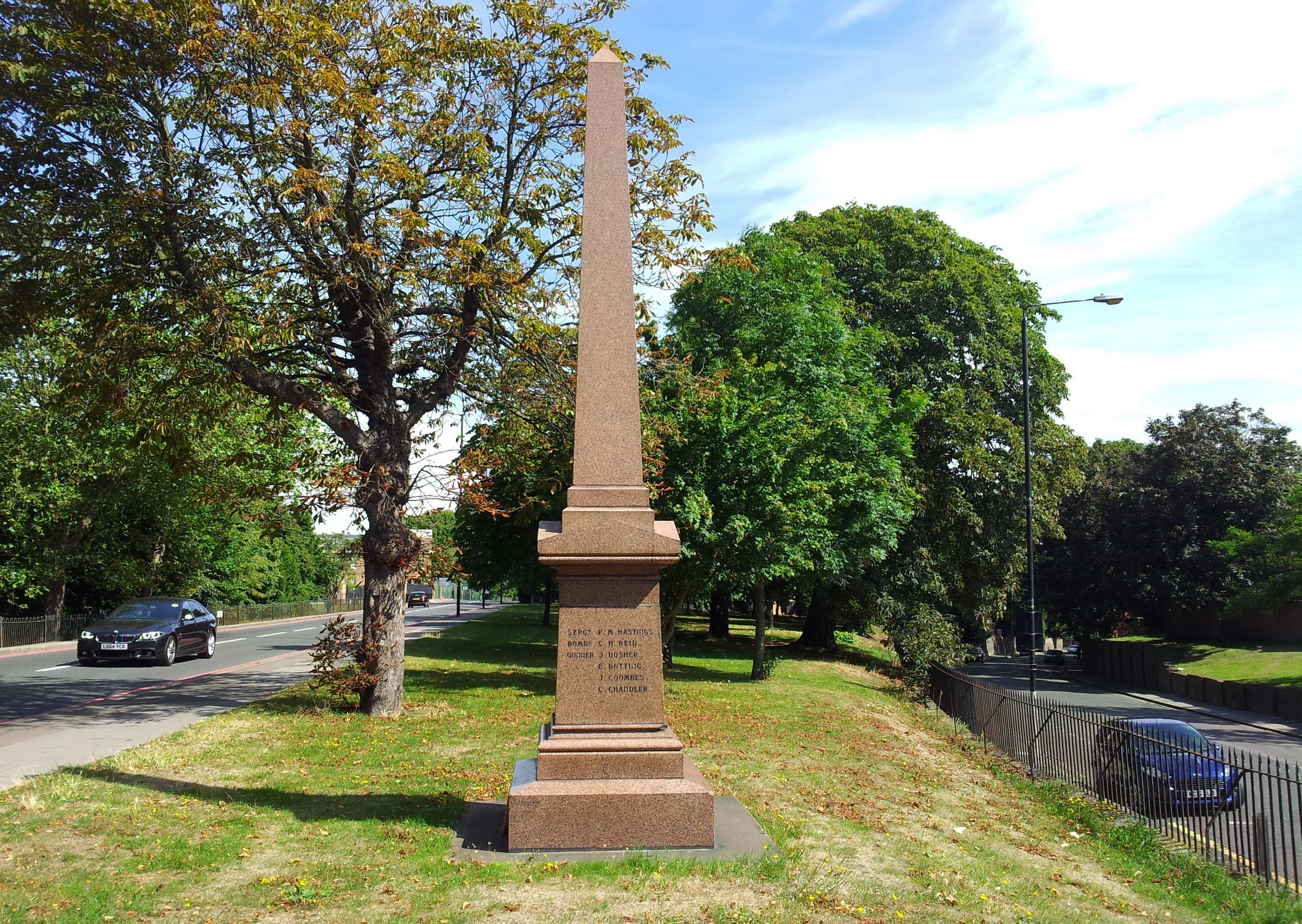
Second Boer War Memorial

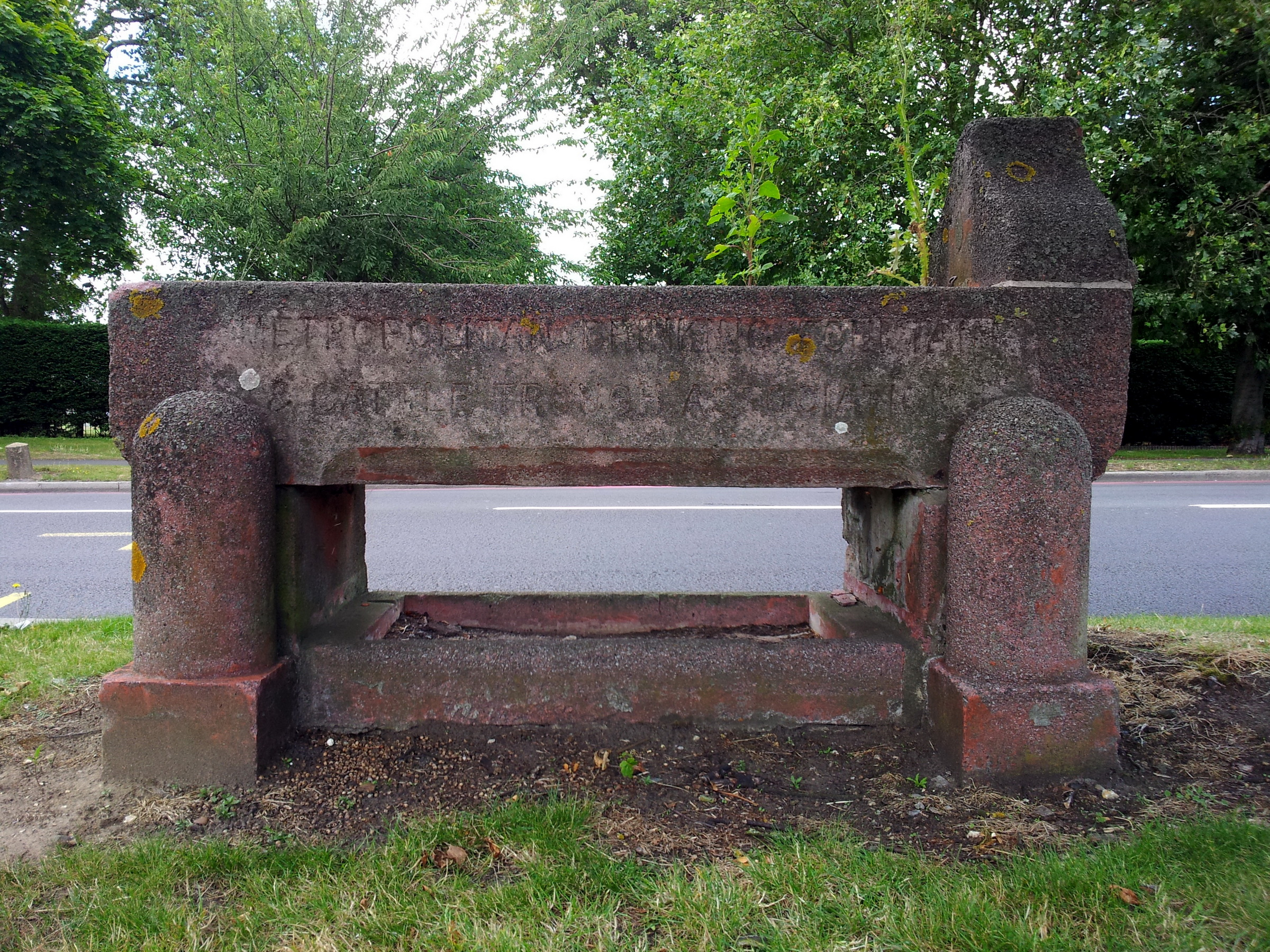
Drinking fountain for horses

== See also ==
- Plumstead Common
- Winn's Common
- Eltham Common
- Charlton cemetery
