= William Ayling =

English cricketer

Personal information
- Born: 30 September 1766; Cocking, Sussex
- Died: October 1826 (aged 59–60); Bromley, Kent
- Relatives: Robert Ayling (brother) (Note: CricketArchive is the only source which identifies the two Aylings as brothers. They played together in 1806 for Woolwich against Marylebone Cricket Club (MCC) at Lord's Old Ground and in an odds match for Kent of 23 players against England at Penenden Heath in 1807.)

Domestic team information
- Years: Team
- 1800–1810: England
- 1806: Kent

William Ayling (30 September 1766 – October 1826) was an English cricketer who played in 22 important matches between 1800 and 1810.

== Career ==
Ayling was born in 1766 at Cocking in Sussex, the son of Robert and Mary Ayling. He was a shoemaker and moved to Bromley in Kent in the early years of the 19th century. (Note: Ayling is known to have played for Storrington in Sussex in 1799 and 1800 but by 1802 was playing for Woolwich Cricket Club in Kent.) He made his debut for England (i.e., the "rest" of England) against Surrey in August 1800 at Lord's Old Ground, and went on to play for a variety of teams, most frequently in matches for England. He played for the Players in the first two Gentlemen v Players matches in 1806 and made one appearance in an important match for Kent against England at Bowman's Lodge in 1806.

Playing more frequently for Kent in non-important matches, including in odds matches, (Note: An odds match is one in which one team has more players than the other, the aim being to even the chances of victory to an extent.) Ayling is known to have played until 1815, playing for club teams including Woolwich and Prince's Plain Club. His batting technique was unusual. He held the bat in one hand until just prior to hitting the ball, and stood square on to the bowler.

Ayling died at Bromley in October 1826. It is possible that he was the brother of the Robert Ayling who played two important matches for Kent in 1796.

== Bibliography ==
- Birley, Derek (1999). A Social History of English Cricket. London: Aurum Press. ISBN 978-18-54107-10-7 – via Internet Archive.
- Carlaw, Derek (2020). Kent County Cricketers, A to Z: Part One (1806–1914) (PDF). Cardiff: ACS.
- Haygarth, Arthur (1996) [1862]. Scores & Biographies, Volume 1 (1744–1826). Kennington: Frederick Lillywhite. ISBN 978-19-00592-23-9.
- Haygarth, Arthur (1997) [1862]. Scores & Biographies, Volume 2 (1827–1840). Kennington: Frederick Lillywhite. ISBN 978-19-00592-23-9.
- Lewis, Paul (2014). For Kent and Country. Eastbourne: Reveille Press. ISBN 978-19-08336-63-7.
