= Marsh's New Ground =

Cricket ground in Rochester, Kent

Marsh's New Ground was a cricket venue in Rochester, Kent. It was used primarily in the 18th century for historically important matches.

On 23 June 1743, the ground was first recorded as the venue for a match between Rochester and Dartford. The result of the match is unknown. It was the return match to one played ten days earlier on Dartford Brent, which Dartford won by 30 runs.

There is no further record of the ground until the 1800 season, when Rochester played against Marylebone Cricket Club (MCC). The teams had met at Lord's Old Ground on 7–9 July, and Rochester had won by 11 runs. The return on Marsh's was played 21–23 July and Rochester won again, this time by 3 wickets.

== Bibliography ==
- Haygarth, Arthur (1996) [1862]. Scores & Biographies, Volume 1 (1744–1826). Kennington: Frederick Lillywhite. ISBN 978-19-00592-23-9.
- Maun, Ian (2009). From Commons to Lord's, Volume One: 1700 to 1750. Cambridge: Roger Heavens. ISBN 978-19-00592-52-9.
