= Thomas Brandon (cricketer) =

English cricketer (c.1725–?)

Thomas Brandon (c.1725–?) was an English cricketer of the mid-Georgian period who played mainly for Dartford Cricket Club and Kent. A top-class player, he was a specialist batsman who played in numerous historically important matches, both eleven-a-side and single wicket. (Note: Any match listed in the ACS' Important Match Guide (1981) is historically important, and therefore of the highest standard, whether or not a scorecard might exist. The same applies to numerous matches discovered by researchers since 1981. For further information, see First-class cricket.)

== Career ==
The earliest known reference to Brandon is on 6 July 1750 when he played for Kent against Surrey at Dartford Brent. Kent won by 3 wickets. Individual batting scores are not on record, but the team totals are known. Surrey scored 57 and 36; Kent replied with 54 and 40/7.

Brandon played in two more matches for Kent in 1750.

In 1754, Brandon played a single wicket match against Parr of Chatham for five guineas a side. Brandon won by 47 runs.

In 1759, he was a member of the Dartford team that twice defeated England.

== Outside cricket ==
Little is known of Brandon personally except that he was a "substantial" shopkeeper in Dartford, who had also acted as both a constable and a churchwarden.

== Bibliography ==
- ACS (1981). A Guide to Important Cricket Matches Played in the British Isles 1709–1863. Nottingham: ACS. OCLC 85045528.
- Ashley-Cooper, F. S. (1929). Kent Cricket Matches, 1719–1880. Canterbury: Gibbs & Sons. OCLC 220674085.
- Haygarth, Arthur (1996) [1862]. Scores & Biographies, Volume 1 (1744–1826). Kennington: Frederick Lillywhite. ISBN 978-19-00592-23-9.
- Maun, Ian (2009). From Commons to Lord's, Volume One: 1700 to 1750. Cambridge: Roger Heavens. ISBN 978-19-00592-52-9.
- Maun, Ian (2011). From Commons to Lord's, Volume Two: 1751 to 1770. Leicester: Martin Wilson. ISBN 978-09-56906-60-1.
- Underdown, David (2000). Start of Play. Westminster: Allen Lane. ISBN 978-07-13993-30-1 – via Internet Archive.
- Waghorn, H. T. (1899). Cricket Scores, Notes, &c. From 1730–1773. Edinburgh: Blackwood. OCLC 1086375331.
