= Lavington Common =

Protected area in West Sussex, England

Coordinates: 50.961°N 0.650°W

- Site of Special Scientific Interest
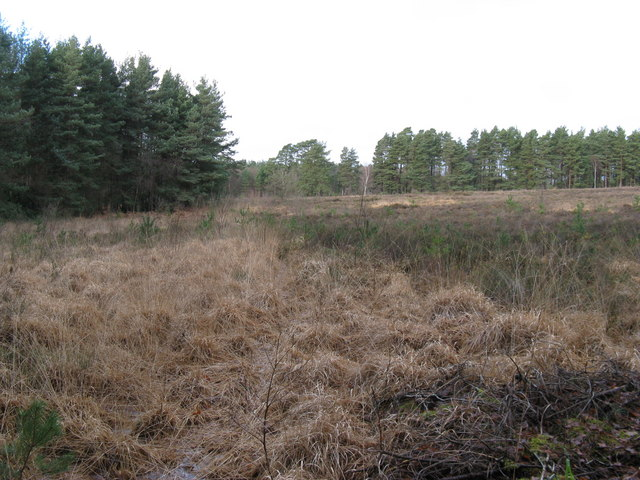
- Location of Lavington Common.
- Area of search: West Sussex
- Grid reference: SU 949 188
- Interest: Biological
- Area: 31.2 hectares (77 acres)
- Notification date: 1985
- Location map: Magic Map

Lavington Common is a 31.2-hectare (77-acre) biological Site of Special Scientific Interest south-west of Petworth in West Sussex. It is a National Trust property.

This site has wet and dry heath, acid grassland and woodland. It has a rich community of invertebrates, especially spiders. Common trees in the woods are silver birch, downy birch and oak, while the shrub layer is dominated by bracken and bramble.
