= John Ward (Kent cricketer) =

English cricketer

John Ward (dates unknown) was an English professional cricketer who made 14 known appearances in important matches between 1800 and 1806. He played most frequently for England and regularly appeared at Lord's. He was one of the leading bowlers of the day, and made an appearance for Kent in 1806. He also played for Rochester Cricket Club.

== Bibliography ==
- Carlaw, Derek (2020). Kent County Cricketers, A to Z: Part One (1806–1914) (PDF). Cardiff: ACS.
