= Aram's New Ground =

Former cricket venue in Surrey

Coordinates: 51.488°N 0.090°W

Aram's New Ground was a cricket venue in Montpelier Gardens, Walworth. Named after its founder George Aram, it was the home of Montpelier Cricket Club, and hosted historically important matches from 1796 to 1806. It was also known as the "Bee Hive Ground" because of its proximity to the Bee Hive pub in Walworth.

The earliest recorded match at Aram's was in June 1796 when a combined Thursday Club/Montpelier team hosted Marylebone Cricket Club (MCC). The ground faded from the records as the Napoleonic Wars progressed, and was last recorded in June 1806 when Montpelier were defeated by Homerton.

The Walworth area had been a location for top-class cricket since the early 18th century, and there are references to Walworth Common as a venue for major matches in 1730 and 1732. F. S. Ashley-Cooper explained that Walworth Common was situated where Westmoreland Road, Faraday Street, and Mann Street stood in 1900. He says the ground was "about three-quarters of a mile from where the Bee Hive Ground (sic) afterwards existed".

== Bibliography ==
- Buckley, G. B. (1935). Fresh Light on 18th Century Cricket. Birmingham: Cotterell & Co. OCLC 23450280.
- Haygarth, Arthur (1996) [1862]. Scores & Biographies, Volume 1 (1744–1826). Kennington: Frederick Lillywhite. ISBN 978-19-00592-23-9.
- Maun, Ian (2009). From Commons to Lord's, Volume One: 1700 to 1750. Cambridge: Roger Heavens. ISBN 978-19-00592-52-9.
