= Barrack Field =

Sports ground in Woolwich, London

Coordinates: 51°28′58″N 0°3′35″E

Barrack Field cricket ground
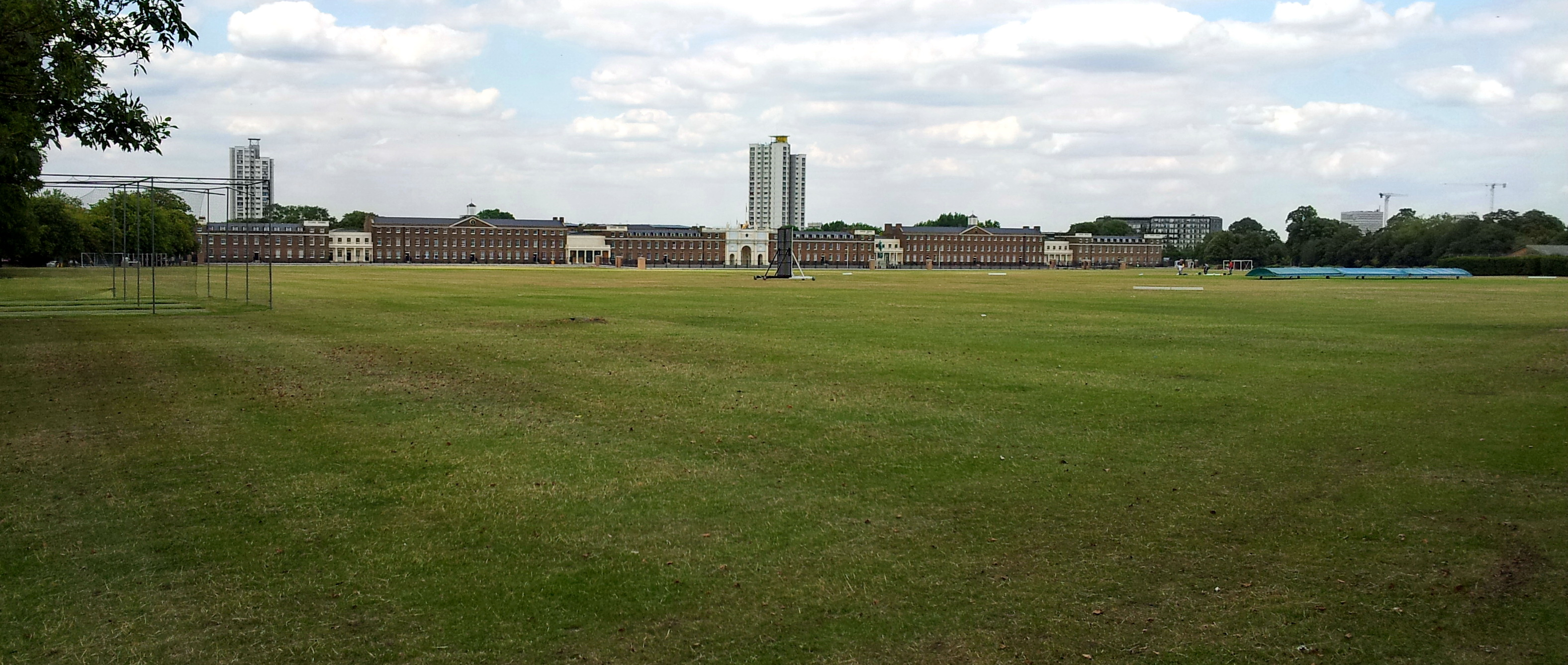
- Barrack Field today. In the background the Royal Artillery Barracks
- Interactive map of Barrack Field cricket ground
- Location: Woolwich, southeast London
- Home club: Woolwich Cricket Club; Royal Artillery Cricket Club
- County club: Kent
- Establishment: by 1754
- Last used: 1806

Barrack Field is located on the grounds of the Royal Artillery Barracks in Woolwich, southeast London (formerly part of Kent). It was once part of Woolwich Common, then used as a venue for historically important cricket matches in the 18th century, and as the home of Woolwich Cricket Club at that time; later it became the home of the Royal Artillery Cricket Club. It is now used as a generic sports field, mainly for football.

== History ==
Woolwich Cricket Club came briefly to prominence in August 1754 when the team played two games against Dartford, who at the time were arguably the strongest team in England. The first match was on Barrack Field, and the return on Dartford Brent. In both matches, the away team won but no further details are known. Both games were mentioned in the same report by Read's Weekly Journal, dated Saturday, 31 August: "Dartford won away & lost at home against Woolwich on Sat. & Mon., Aug. 24 & 26 respectively".

The Woolwich club's ability to successfully challenge Dartford at this time clearly infers that it was a leading club in the 1750s, but its new-found prominence was short-lived, probably because of the outbreak of the Seven Years' War (1756–1763), which severely limited top-class cricket through its span. The war began, officially, on 17 May 1756, when Britain formally declared war on France. The impact of this war on cricket can be seen in the ACS' Important Matches booklet. It has only sixteen entries for all seven seasons from 1757 to 1763, with none at all in 1760.

The club revived in the last ten years of the 18th century when, following the establishment of Marylebone Cricket Club in 1787, club cricket became very fashionable in London, and matches between the town clubs were very popular. Barrack Field was frequently used for matches during the Regency era. In all, well over 850 matches—mostly involving service teams—took place on the ground between 1754 and 2014. However, their list is incomplete because it excludes eight historically important matches played there between 1797 and 1802, all of which are listed below:

- 23–24 August 1797 – Woolwich v Croydon. Woolwich won by 23 runs.
- 27 September 1797 – Woolwich v Croydon. Woolwich won by 179 runs.
- 16–17 August 1798 – Woolwich v Croydon. Woolwich won by 88 runs.
- 8–9 October 1798 – Woolwich v Montpelier. Match drawn.
- 26 May 1800 – Woolwich v Four Parishes. Match drawn.
- 30 June 1800 – Lord Frederick Beauclerk's XI v Sir H. W. Marten's XI. Beauclerk's XI won by 60 runs.
- 16 May 1802 – Woolwich v MCC. Result unknown.
- 19 July 1802 – Woolwich v Montpelier. Result unknown.

The list is by no means exhaustive as ongoing research may find references to other matches at the ground.

== Cricket venue ==
It is possible that Woolwich Cricket Club was eventually merged into the Royal Artillery Cricket Club (RACC), or alternatively that it disbanded after the RACC took full possession of Barrack Field. According to its own website, RACC first took part in cricket matches in 1765, having been started as a private club by Royal Artillery officers. It was formally constituted as a regimental club as late as 1906. The RACC team now plays at the Sharp Cricket Ground in Larkhill Garrison.

== Bibliography ==
- ACS (1981). A Guide to Important Cricket Matches Played in the British Isles 1709–1863. Nottingham: ACS. OCLC 85045528.
- Buckley, G. B. (1937). Fresh Light on pre-Victorian Cricket. Birmingham: Cotterell & Co. OCLC 23469107.
- Haygarth, Arthur (1996) [1862]. Scores & Biographies, Volume 1 (1744–1826). Kennington: Frederick Lillywhite. ISBN 978-19-00592-23-9.
- Waghorn, H. T. (2005) [1906]. The Dawn of Cricket. London: J. W. McKenzie. ISBN 978-09-47821-17-3.
