= Homerton Cricket Club =

Historical English cricket team

Personnel
- Chairman: Gary Horsman

Team information
- Established: by 1800
- Last match: 1808 (reconstituted in 2012)
- Home venue: Homerton

History
- Notable players: Felix Ladbroke; Thomas Vigne; Lord Frederick Beauclerk

Homerton Cricket Club was based in Homerton, Hackney and played historically important matches during the first decade of the 19th century. The club had been established in the 18th century and it first came to notice in 1800 when it played the strong Montpelier team. In 1801, Homerton defeated Marylebone Cricket Club (MCC) at Lord's Old Ground by 181 runs.

Homerton's first important match was in June 1804 when a combined MCC/Homerton XI lost to Hampshire at Lord's by 6 wkts.

Homerton's period of renown ended in 1808 when, despite four given men, the team was well-beaten by MCC in its last important match. In the same year, Homerton lost twice to Essex in minor matches.

The club disappeared from the sources after 1808 and disbanded at some point. It must have lost personnel to military duties in the Napoleonic War which had a disastrous impact on cricket at the time.

Homerton Cricket Club was reconstituted in 2012 under Gary Horsman, then president of Chats Palace CC. The reconstitution was agreed at an extraordinary AGM and formalised by a unanimous vote carrying the motion forward. The club plays fixtures in and around Hackney and is a founding member of the Victoria Park Community Cricket League.
