= Woolwich Cricket Club =

Historical English cricket team

Team information
- Established: early 18th century
- Last match: 1806
- Home venue: Barrack Field

History
- Notable players: William Ayling; John Tanner; John Ward

Woolwich Cricket Club was formed sometime in the first half of the 18th century, or earlier, in the town of Woolwich, Kent. Its earliest known record is in 1754 when its team played two historically important matches against the prominent Dartford Cricket Club. The club, or at least a successor of it, then played a number of matches from 1797 to 1806 against Marylebone Cricket Club (MCC), Montpelier, Croydon, and other leading town clubs. After playing MCC in 1806, the club disappeared from the records.

Throughout the period from 1754 to 1806, Woolwich's home ground was Barrack Field, part of Woolwich Common, which remained the home ground of the Royal Artillery Cricket Club (RACC) until 2014. Mainstays of the Woolwich team in its "Napoleonic period" were William Ayling, John Tanner, and John Ward.

== 1754 ==
Woolwich came briefly to prominence in August 1754 when the team played two games against Dartford, who at the time were arguably the strongest team in England. The first match was on Barrack Field, and the return on Dartford Brent. In both matches, the away team won but no further details are known. Both games were mentioned in the same report by Read's Weekly Journal, dated Saturday, 31 August: "Dartford won away & lost at home against Woolwich on Sat. & Mon., Aug. 24 & 26 respectively".

Woolwich's ability to successfully challenge Dartford infers that it was a leading club in the 1750s, but its new-found prominence was short-lived, probably because of the outbreak of the Seven Years' War (1756–1763), which severely limited top-class cricket through its span. The war began, officially, on 17 May 1756, when Britain formally declared war on France. The impact of this war on cricket can be seen in the ACS' Important Matches booklet. It has only sixteen entries for all seven seasons from 1757 to 1763, with none at all in 1760.

== 1797 to 1806 ==
In the years around the turn of the century, club cricket became fashionable in London, and historically important matches between the town clubs were popular. Woolwich reappeared in 1797 with two victories against Croydon, both at Barrack Field.

In 1798, the club played home and away against both Croydon and Montpelier. Following two substantial victories against Croydon, Woolwich lost to Montpelier at Aram's New Ground, and then drew the return at Barrack Field.

In 1800, Woolwich played home and away matches against Marylebone Cricket Club (MCC) and won both, including an innings victory at Lord's Old Ground. In what was a very successful season, the team also defeated Montpelier by 8 wickets at Barrack Field.

Woolwich played three more games against MCC at Lord's Old Ground between 1802 and 1804, winning in 1802 and 1803, but losing by 7 wickets in 1806.

== Royal Artillery Cricket Club (RACC) ==
It is possible that Woolwich Cricket Club was eventually merged into the Royal Artillery Cricket Club (RACC), or alternatively that it disbanded after the RACC took full possession of Barrack Field. According to its own website, RACC first took part in cricket matches in 1765, having been started as a private club by Royal Artillery officers. It was formally constituted as a regimental club as late as 1906. The RACC team now plays at the Sharp Cricket Ground in Larkhill Garrison.

On 21–23 August 1862, RACC hosted the All England Eleven (AEE) in an odds match. The venue is given as Woolwich Common, not Barrack Field. RACC had 22 players but still lost by 6 wickets to a team captained by George Parr, and including Tom Hayward Sr, John Jackson, H. H. Stephenson, and Ned Willsher.

== Bibliography ==
- ACS (1981). A Guide to Important Cricket Matches Played in the British Isles 1709–1863. Nottingham: ACS. OCLC 85045528.
- Buckley, G. B. (1937). Fresh Light on pre-Victorian Cricket. Birmingham: Cotterell & Co. OCLC 23469107.
- Haygarth, Arthur (1996) [1862]. Scores & Biographies, Volume 1 (1744–1826). Kennington: Frederick Lillywhite. ISBN 978-19-00592-23-9.
- Waghorn, H. T. (2005) [1906]. The Dawn of Cricket. London: J. W. McKenzie. ISBN 978-09-47821-17-3.
