= Samuel Britcher =

English cricket scorer and archivist

Samuel Britcher (date of birth unknown; died c. 1805, probably in London) was a cricket Scorer and archivist who recorded the full scorecards of numerous matches played in the early years of Marylebone Cricket Club after its official foundation during the 1787 English cricket season.

Britcher is believed to have been MCC's first official scorer and he published an annual set of scorecards from 1790 to 1805 under the title of A list of all the principal Matches of Cricket that have been played in the year ccyy (i.e., annual series where ccyy = 1790 to 1805).

Little is known of Samuel Britcher personally but his scorecards are considered important to the study of cricket history and especially its statistics. Britcher's work lay mostly undiscovered for two centuries and it is only in the 21st century that a full study of his records has been possible.

Keith Warsop of the Association of Cricket Statisticians published two articles in The Cricket Statistician, the quarterly journal of the ACS, during 2006 which outlined the importance of Britcher's scores to knowledge of the period.

== Bibliography ==
- Samuel Britcher, A list of all the principal Matches of Cricket that have been played (1790 to 1805), annual series
- David Rayvern Allen, Samuel Britcher, The Hidden Scorer, 1982
- Britcher's Scores 1790-1805, 2002 reprint (ed. Christopher Saunders) with accompanying volume by David Rayvern Allen
