= Montpelier Cricket Club =

Historical English cricket team

Coordinates: 51.488°N 0.090°W

The Montpelier Cricket Club was prominent in English cricket from about 1796, when it began to compete against Marylebone Cricket Club and other leading "town clubs", until 1845 when its members were the prime movers in the formation of Surrey County Cricket Club. The club was based at Aram's New Ground in Montpelier Gardens, Walworth, Surrey. It was also known as the "Bee Hive Ground" because of its proximity to the Bee Hive pub in Walworth.

The Montpelier club acted through one of its presidents, a Mr William Houghton of Brixton Hill, to obtain a suitable venue for the proposed Surrey county club. In 1845, Houghton obtained a lease from the Duchy of Cornwall of land in Kennington. The initial lease was for 31 years at £120 per annum. Whereas Lord's had formerly been a duckpond, The Oval had previously been a cabbage patch and market garden, requiring considerable work to convert the land. The original turf cost £300 and some 10,000 turfs from Tooting Common were laid in March 1845.

Surrey County Cricket Club was founded on the evening of 22 August 1845 at the Horns Tavern in south London, where around 100 representatives of various cricket clubs in Surrey agreed a motion put by William Denison (the club's first Secretary), "that a Surrey club be now formed". A further meeting at the Tavern on 18 October 1845 formally constituted the club, appointed officers and began enrolling members. Seventy Montpelier members formed the nucleus of the new county club. The Honourable Fred Ponsonby, later the Earl of Bessborough, was the first vice-president.

== Bibliography ==
- Philip Paine, The Montpelier Cricket Club: Predecessor of Surrey County Cricket Club, Mischief Makers, 2010, ISBN 978-0955543388

== External sources ==
- Vauxhall Society – The Oval
