= Robert Eures =

English cricketer (18th century)

Robert Eures (dates of birth and death unknown) was an English cricketer of the mid-Georgian period. He came from Bexley in Kent, and played for both Bexley Cricket Club and the Kent county team, as well as for England. A top-class player, Eures made numerous appearances in historically important matches, both eleven-a-side and single wicket. (Note: Any match listed in the ACS' Important Match Guide (1981) is historically important, and therefore of the highest standard, whether or not a scorecard might exist. The same applies to numerous matches discovered by researchers since 1981. For further information, see First-class cricket.) He is known to have been a good batsman, and was frequently involved in single wicket events, which were very popular during his career, attracting high stakes.

== Career ==
=== 1746 ===
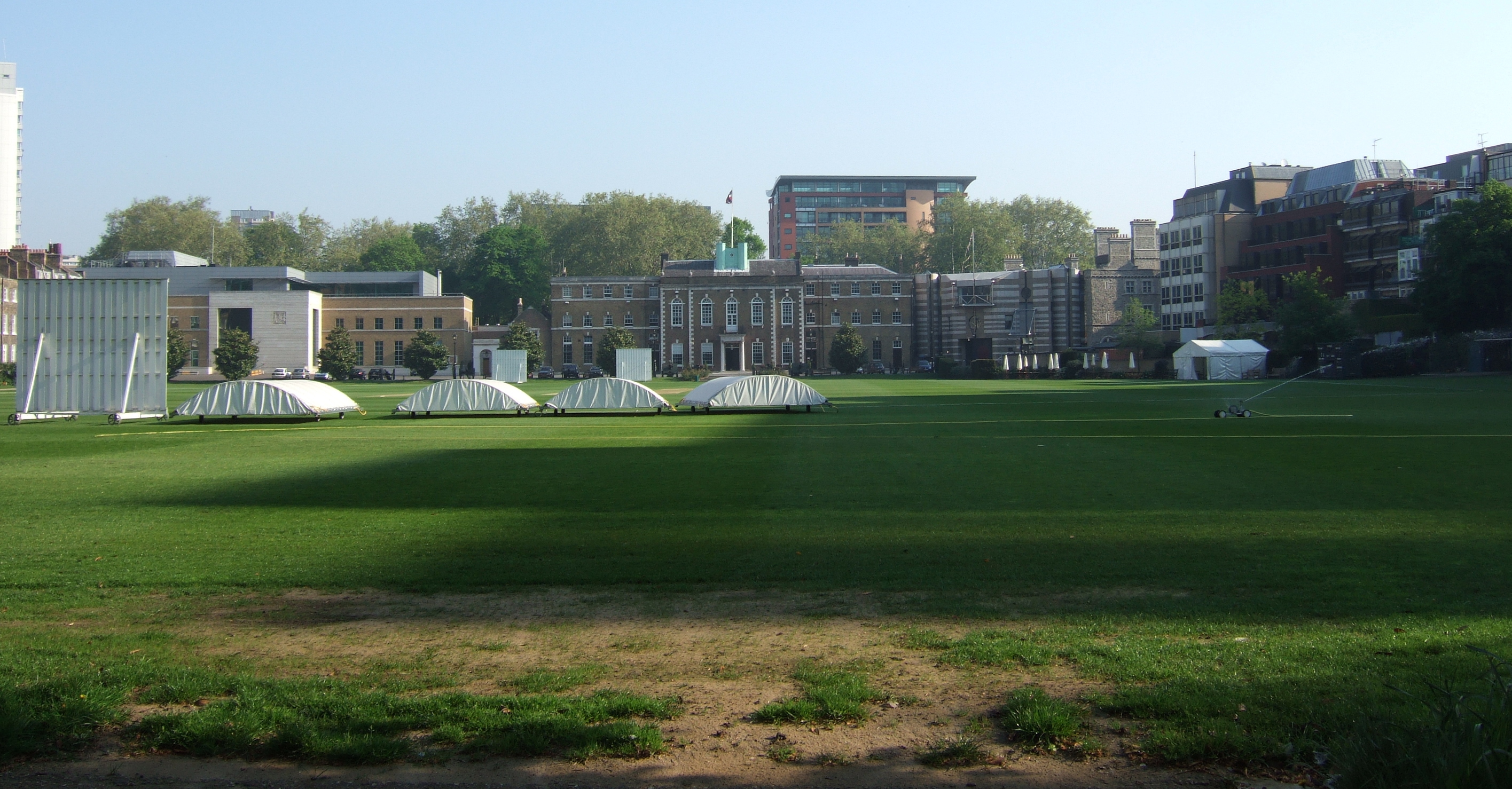
Robert Eures played in several matches on the Artillery Ground, here pictured in 2008.

On 23 June 1746, Kent and Surrey were scheduled to play on the Artillery Ground. Kent's team consisted entirely of players from Bromley, Bexley, and Sevenoaks; they included Eures, Robert Colchin, George Kipps, John Bowra, James Bryant, and John Bryant.

=== 1747 ===
Two games between Kent and England were due to be played at Bromley Common on Monday, 29 June, and at the Artillery Ground on Wednesday, 1 July, but both matches were "deferred on account of the gentlemen subscribers being engaged at several Elections"; the parliamentary election of 1747 resulting in a Whig government under Henry Pelham.

The match on the Artillery Ground was re-arranged for 31 August, and the Bromley Common one for 2 September. Most of the players were from one of eight clubs: Addington, Bexley, Bromley, Dartford, Hadlow, London, Sevenoaks, and Slindon. The Daily Advertiser announced the teams on 31 August:

- England: Richard Newland (Slindon), Green (Amberley, Sussex), Stephen Dingate, Little Bennett, Thomas Jure (all London), Tom Faulkner, Joe Harris, Broad, George Jackson (all Addington), William Sawyer (Richmond), and Maynard (Surrey).
- Kent: Robert Colchin, James Bryant, John Bryant (all Bromley), Val Romney, George Kipps, John Mansfield (all Sevenoaks), John Bell, Thomas Bell (both Dartford), Jones, John Larkin (both Hadlow), and Robert Eures (Bexley).

The source also carried a statement by George Smith, the Artillery Ground keeper:

The Town may be certain that the taking Six-pence Admittance is out of no avaricious Temper. Two-pence being greatly insufficient to the Charge that attends the Matches, which Mr Smith is ready and willing to make appear to any Gentleman.

Neither match has a known result.

=== 1749 ===
Eures played for a strong England team in two matches against Surrey, which was the leading county team that season. Surrey won the first by 2 wickets; the second was drawn.

Members of London Cricket Club arranged two select XI matches on the Artillery Ground. The first on 26 June was between Long Robin's XI and Stephen Dingate's XI for 100 guineas a side, the second was on 28 August between Long Robin's XI and Tom Faulkner's XI for sixty guineas a side. Eures played for Long Robin's XI in the first match, and for Faulkner's XI in the second. The results are unknown.

In a single wicket match at the Artillery Ground on Monday, 10 July, Five of England defeated Five of Addington. The match was played for fifty guineas a side, and was the result of a challenge by the Addington players to meet any other five in England. Betting was 8–1 in favour of Addington. The Addington five were Tom Faulkner, Joe Harris, John Harris, George Jackson, and William Durling. Eures played for England alongside Robert Colchin, John Bryant, John Bell, and Thomas Waymark.

A return match was played Monday, 17 July, also on the Artillery Ground. Both teams were the same, and this time Addington won. The prize was again fifty guineas. A decider was played Wednesday, 26 July, again on the Artillery Ground, which England won by 2 runs. They scored 11 and 12; Addington replied with 16 and 5. The prize this time was 100 guineas. England had made two changes to their team with James Bryant and Val Romney replacing Bell and Waymark. Addington's five were unchanged.

=== 1752 ===
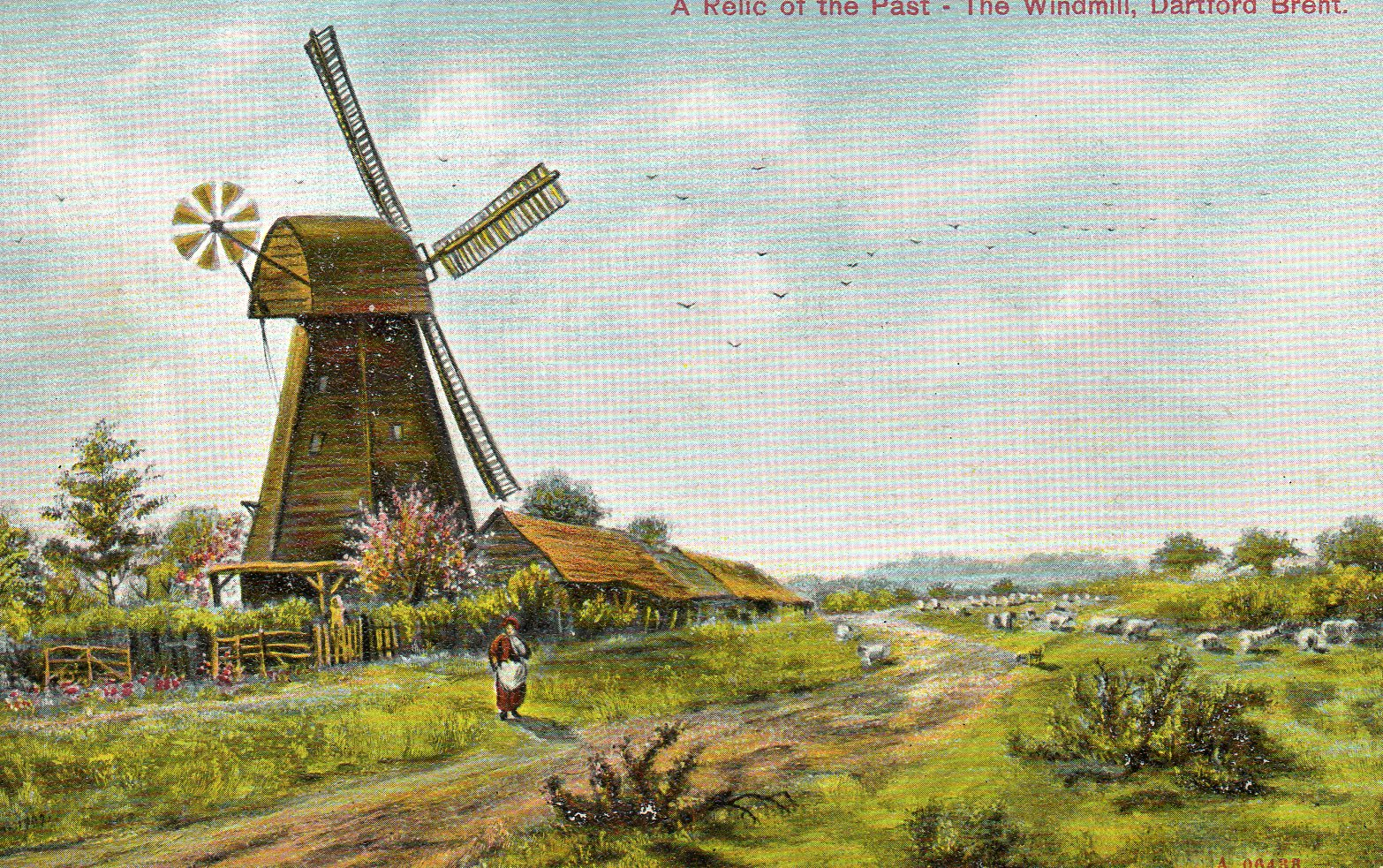
Dartford Brent, where Robert Eures played in 1752

In 1752, Eures was named as one of the three principal players when the famous Dartford Cricket Club issued a challenge to "the rest of England". Dartford's challenge was that with William Hodsoll, John Bryant, Robert Eures, and "eight players from the parish of Dartford", it could take on and defeat any eleven players from the rest of England. The match was due to be played on 29 July 1752 at Dartford Brent, but no result has been found.

A second match was to be played 11 August, again on Dartford Brent. The announcement said: "Dartford with 4 men allowed against 11 men to be picked out of All England, for £20 a side". As before, the result is unknown.

Eures is not found in the sources after 1752. Nothing is known of his later life.

== Bibliography ==
- ACS (1981). A Guide to Important Cricket Matches Played in the British Isles 1709–1863. Nottingham: ACS. OCLC 85045528.
- Ashley-Cooper, F. S. (1929). Kent Cricket Matches, 1719–1880. Canterbury: Gibbs & Sons. OCLC 220674085.
- Buckley, G. B. (1935). Fresh Light on 18th Century Cricket. Birmingham: Cotterell & Co. OCLC 23450280.
- Maun, Ian (2009). From Commons to Lord's, Volume One: 1700 to 1750. Cambridge: Roger Heavens. ISBN 978-19-00592-52-9.
- Maun, Ian (2011). From Commons to Lord's, Volume Two: 1751 to 1770. Leicester: Martin Wilson. ISBN 978-09-56906-60-1.
- McCann, Tim (2004). Sussex Cricket in the Eighteenth Century (PDF). Vol. 88. Lewes: West Sussex Record Office. ISBN 978-08-54450-55-8.
- Waghorn, H. T. (2005) [1906]. The Dawn of Cricket. London: J. W. McKenzie. ISBN 978-09-47821-17-3.
- Williams, Basil (1962). The Whig Supremacy, 1714-1760 (2nd ed.). Oxford University Press. OCLC 222038800.
