= 1747 English cricket season =

Cricket season review

A total of 21 historically important matches are known to have been played in the 1747 English cricket season; fourteen were eleven-a-side, and seven were single wicket, but only three have known results. (Note: Any match listed in the ACS' Important Match Guide (1981) is historically important, and therefore of the highest standard, whether or not a scorecard might exist. The same applies to numerous matches discovered by researchers since 1981. For further information, see First-class cricket.)

It is evident that the single-wicket form of the game was very popular among the gamblers who thronged the Artillery Ground. Some matches were disrupted because of that year's parliamentary election, which resulted in a win for the Whigs under Henry Pelham.

== Kent v England ==
Two games between Kent and England were due to be played at Bromley Common on Monday, 29 June, and at the Artillery Ground on Wednesday, 1 July, but both matches were 'deferred on account of the gentlemen subscribers being engaged at several Elections'. The parliamentary election of 1747 resulted in a Whig government under Henry Pelham (1694–1754). In those days, voting was limited to male landed gentry.

The match on the Artillery Ground was re-arranged for 31 August, and the Bromley Common one for 2 September. Most of the players were from one of eight clubs: Addington, Bexley, Bromley, Dartford, Hadlow, London, Sevenoaks, and Slindon. The Daily Advertiser announced the teams on 31 August:

- England—Richard Newland (Slindon), Green (Amberley, Sussex), Stephen Dingate, Little Bennett, Thomas Jure (all London), Tom Faulkner, Joe Harris, Broad, George Jackson (all Addington), William Sawyer (Richmond), and Maynard (Surrey).
- Kent—Robert Colchin, James Bryant, John Bryant (all Bromley), Val Romney, George Kipps, John Mansfield (all Sevenoaks), John Bell, Thomas Bell (both Dartford), Jones, John Larkin (both Hadlow), and Robert Eures (Bexley).

The source also carried a statement by George Smith, the Artillery Ground keeper: 'The Town may be certain that the taking Six-pence Admittance is out of no avaricious Temper. Two-pence being greatly insufficient to the Charge that attends the Matches, which Mr Smith is ready and willing to make appear to any Gentleman'.

Both matches are 'result unknown'.

== Addington & Croydon v London ==
A combined Addington & Croydon team played three matches against London. The first, played at Duppas Hill, Croydon, on 29 May was unfinished when scheduled time expired. The players agreed to play it out more than a week later. That happened a week after the return match on 1 June at the Artillery Ground. The match recommenced on 9 June, and was won by Addington & Croydon.

The scheduled return took place 1 and 2 June on the Artillery Ground, where London won. The third match, also on the Artillery Ground, was arranged for 15 June, but the result is unknown. A newspaper announcement stated: 'They have played two matches this season, and each won one with great difficulty, being two days playing each match'.

== Single wicket matches by date ==
Five of Slindon played four matches in July, all on the Artillery Ground. On the 6th, they met Five of Dartford. This was the result of a challenge by Slindon, published in the Daily Advertiser on Monday, 29 June to play 'five of any parish in England, for their own Sum'. The announcement advised interested parties: 'If it is accepted of by any, they are desir'd to go to Mr Smith, who has Orders to make Stakes for them". The three Newland brothers—Adam, John, and Richard—all played. On Saturday, 4 July, George Smith announced in the same paper that 'five of Dartford in Kent, have made Stakes with him, and will play with the above Gentlemen at the Time and Place above mentioned for twenty Pounds'. Slindon's next match on the 8th was against Five of Bromley, and this was another game resulting from the challenge. At least one of the Newland brothers played for Slindon. On the 10th and 15th of the month, Slindon played against Five of Hadlow. Details of neither match are known.

In early August, there were two single wicket matches at the Artillery Ground which were organised by the 2nd Duke of Richmond. In the first, three of his employees Stephen Dingate, Joseph Rudd, and Pye defeated Little and Tall Bennett, and William Anderson. In the second, the same threes were to play again but in a 'fives' match with the two—James and John—Bryant brothers added to the Duke's team, and with Tom Faulkner and one—either Joe or John—of the Harris brothers to their opponents. The result of the second game is unknown.

On Saturday, 5 September, there was a three-a-side game at the Artillery Ground between Long Robin's Three and Stephen Dingate's Three. The teams were Robert Colchin (alias Long Robin), John Harris, and Val Romney against Stephen Dingate, Richard Newland, and Thomas Jure. It was played for sixty guineas per side, and the players were specially chosen from those who had played in the Kent v England games above, so possibly they were the best performers in those matches. It was ruled that 'all Strokes behind as well as before Wickets' counted, and in this respect the contest 'differs from any Three Match ever play'd'.

== Matches with unknown results ==
Addington & Croydon v Deptford & Greenwich, to be played 13 May at Duppas Hill was pre-announced in the London Evening Post on Saturday, 9 May. No post-match report has been found.

Two Dartford v London matches were scheduled for 12 and 29 June, on Dartford Brent and the Artillery Ground respectively. Dartford had another match 2 July, against Hadlow on Dartford Brent. This was pre-announced in the Penny London Post of Wednesday, 1 July as 'the deciding match' but there is no report of the game, and no references to the earlier fixture(s).

If it was played, one of the biggest matches of the 1747 season might have been Long Robin's Nine v William Hodsoll's Ten on the Artillery Ground. Planned for 9 July, it was a 'scratch match' arranged by members of the London club. The players were mostly from London, Bromley, Dartford, Hadlow, and Slindon. Long Robin's Nine were Robert Colchin, all three—Adam, John, and Richard—Newland brothers, both—James and John—the Bryant brothers, Little Bennett, John Bowra, and Thomas Jure. Hodsoll's Ten were William Hodsoll, Allen, John Bell, Thomas Bell, Broad, Tom Faulkner, one—either Joe or John—of the Harris brothers, and three players from Hadlow who were John Larkin, Jones, and one unnamed team-mate.

A similar match was planned for 28 July on Kennington Common between Tom Faulkner's XI and John Bowra's XI. This was billed as 'Long Tom of Surrey against the Kentish Shepherd', those being the nicknames of Tom Faulkner, who was also a prizefighter, and John Bowra. The other players would be 'ten other persons on each team, picked out of different parts'. An additional comment said: 'Long Tom is well known for his excellent play and therefore needs no puffs; he backs himself 5 to 4 against the Kentish shepherd'.

Three matches in August were London v Bromley & Ripley (Artillery Ground); Bromley & Ripley v London (Ripley Green); and London v Hadlow (Artillery Ground). Before the first game on the Artillery Ground, George Smith published a statement: 'These matches being attended with great Charge the Door, for the Future, will be Six-pence; Two-pence not being sufficient to defray the Expense'. Hadlow, near Tonbridge in Kent, was stated to be 'a famous parish for cricket'.

== Other events ==
According to Rowland Bowen, cricket was first played in New York this year. This is, however, doubted by Ian Maun, who states that 'no contemporary record of cricket in New York is known before 1751'.

== First mentions ==
=== Clubs and teams ===
- Addington & Croydon
- Bromley & Ripley
- Hadlow
- John Bowra's XI
- Tom Faulkner's XI

=== Venues ===
- Ripley Green

=== Players ===
name	club/county	notes
Allen	Dartford, Kent, and Middlesex	Recorded in one match in 1747. Ashley-Cooper says he 'afterwards played for Middlesex'. Also played for England in 1759.
John Bell	Dartford and Kent	Noted wicket-keeper.
Thomas Bell	Dartford and Kent	Brother of the above. Condemned to death in 1762 but later reprieved.
Thomas Jure	London	Mentioned in match reports from 1747 to 1749.
John Mansfield	Sevenoaks and Kent	Batsman noted for single wicket appearances.
John Larkin	Hadlow and Kent	Noted single wicket performer.
Jones	Hadlow and Kent	Mentioned in match reports from 1747 to 1749.
Joseph Rudd	Sussex	Noted single wicket performers.
Pye	Sussex	Noted single wicket performers.
Henry Venn	England or Surrey	Played cricket at the University of Cambridge until he was ordained in June 1747. His biographer says he played in an England v Surrey match shortly beforehand. Venn was said to have been 'a good batsman'.

== Bibliography ==
- ACS (1981). A Guide to Important Cricket Matches Played in the British Isles 1709–1863. Nottingham: ACS. OCLC 85045528.
- Bowen, Rowland (1970). Cricket: A History of its Growth and Development. London: Eyre & Spottiswoode. ISBN 978-04-13278-60-9.
- Buckley, G. B. (1935). Fresh Light on 18th Century Cricket. Birmingham: Cotterell & Co. OCLC 23450280.
- Buckley, G. B. (1937). Fresh Light on pre-Victorian Cricket. Birmingham: Cotterell & Co. OCLC 23469107.
- Haygarth, Arthur (1996) [1862]. Scores & Biographies, Volume 1 (1744–1826). Kennington: Frederick Lillywhite. ISBN 978-19-00592-23-9.
- Maun, Ian (2009). From Commons to Lord's, Volume One: 1700 to 1750. Cambridge: Roger Heavens. ISBN 978-19-00592-52-9.
- McCann, Tim (2004). Sussex Cricket in the Eighteenth Century (PDF). Vol. 88. Lewes: West Sussex Record Office. ISBN 978-08-54450-55-8.
