= John Bowra =

English cricketer (18th century)

John Bowra (dates unknown) was an English cricketer of the mid-Georgian period who played for Bromley and Kent. He also represented various England teams. A top-class player, he made numerous appearances in historically important matches, both eleven-a-side and single wicket. (Note: Matches at this time were played on rudimentary pitches with a two-stump wicket. The batter used a curved bat and the bowler delivered the ball with an underarm action by bowling it all along the ground. The sport underwent an evolutionary change in the 1760s when bowlers began pitching the ball, still using an underarm action, and the modern straight bat was introduced in response.) (Note: Scorecard data till at least 1825 was never comprehensive, especially the dismissal information: bowling analyses lacked balls bowled and runs conceded; bowlers were not credited with wickets when the batsman was caught or stumped; in many matches, the means of dismissal were omitted.) His name was also spelled "Borah", and "Boarer" when he played for London in 1739. Known as the "Kentish Shepherd", he is believed to have been the father of William Bowra (1752–1820).

== 1739 ==
On 5 and 19 July 1739, London played two matches against a combined Kingston & Moulsey team. The first was on Moulsey Hurst, and the return on Kennington Common. The London & Country Journal, dated Tuesday, 24 July, reporting on the second match, made references to the first. It seems that Kingston & Moulsey won the first game because of "the Londoners turning out three bad men who played on Moulsey Hurst". Kingston & Moulsey won the second game by three runs despite losing "five of their best hands" from the earlier match. London had replaced the "three bad men" with Lord John Sackville, Mr Dunn, and Mr Boarer (sic) who were described as "three very good gamesters". This is the earliest known reference to Bowra.

- See History of English cricket (1726–1750)#England teams for additional content.

== 1745 ==
Two of the biggest matches of the 1745 season were played 26 June and 5 July on the Artillery Ground. The first was publicised as Long Robin's XI v Richard Newland's XI. Robert Colchin was nicknamed "Long Robin" because of his height. The teams for the first match were named, some of the players for the first time. No details of the scores were reported, but the result was a victory for Long Robin's XI by "over 70 runs". The match was "arranged by the noblemen and gentlemen of the London Club". The teams were:

- Long Robin's XI: Robert Colchin (captain), Tom Faulkner, James Bryant, Joe Harris, Broad, Hodge, Val Romney, George Jackson, Robert Lascoe, John Harris, and John Bowra.
- Richard Newland's XI: Richard Newland (captain), James Bryant, Norton, Jacob Mann, Little and Tall Bennett, Martin, Howlett, William Anderson, Norris, and Howard.

The fixture was repeated on 5 July. The players were not named, but it was between the same teams. The match was publicised differently as "Sevenoaks, Bromley & Addington versus Slindon, Horsmonden, Chislehurst & London". As before, the match was "arranged by the noblemen and gentlemen of the London Club". No details of the play are known, but the result was another win for Long Robin's XI, this time by 5 wickets.

== 1746 ==
On 23 June 1746, Kent and Surrey were scheduled to play on the Artillery Ground. Kent's team consisted entirely of players from the Bromley, Bexley, and Sevenoaks clubs; these included Robert Colchin, George Kipps, John Bowra, James Bryant, John Bryant, and Robert Eures.

== 1747 ==
If it was played, one of the biggest matches of the 1747 season might have been Long Robin's Nine v William Hodsoll's Ten on the Artillery Ground. Planned for 9 July, it was a "scratch match" arranged by members of the London club. The players were mostly from London, Bromley, Dartford, Hadlow, and Slindon. Long Robin's Nine were Robert Colchin, all three—Adam, John, and Richard—Newland brothers, both—James and John—the Bryant brothers, Little Bennett, John Bowra, and Thomas Jure. Hodsoll's Ten were William Hodsoll, Allen, John Bell, Thomas Bell, Broad, Tom Faulkner, one—either Joe or John—of the Harris brothers, and three players from Hadlow who were John Larkin, Jones, and one unnamed team-mate.

A similar match was planned for 28 July 1747 on Kennington Common between Tom Faulkner's XI and John Bowra's XI. This was billed as "Long Tom of Surrey against the Kentish Shepherd", those being the nicknames of Tom Faulkner, who was also a prizefighter, and John Bowra. The other players would be "ten other persons on each team, picked out of different parts". An additional comment said: "Long Tom is well known for his excellent play and therefore needs no puffs; he backs himself 5 to 4 against the Kentish shepherd".

== 1749 ==
Members of London Cricket Club arranged two select XI matches on the Artillery Ground, the first on 26 June was between Long Robin's XI and Stephen Dingate's XI for one hundred guineas a side, the second on 28 August between Long Robin's XI and Tom Faulkner's XI for sixty guineas a side. On 26 June, William Hodsoll was due to play for one team or the other, but had to withdraw. The teams were:

- Long Robin's XI: Robert Colchin, John Bryant, James Bryant, John Bell, John Mansfield, Robert Eures, Val Romney, William Durling, John Colchin, John Bowra, and John Larkin.
- Stephen Dingate's XI: Stephen Dingate, Tom Faulkner, Joe Harris, John Harris, George Jackson, John Frame, Humphreys, Little Bennett, Tom Peake, John Capon, and Thomas Jure.

This was Bowra's last known appearance. Except that he is believed to have been the father of William Bowra (1752–1820), there is no further mention of him in the sources. His dates of birth and death are unknown.

== See also ==
- 1739 English cricket season
- 1745 English cricket season
- 1746 English cricket season
- 1747 English cricket season
- 1749 English cricket season
- History of English cricket (1726–1750)
- List of Kent county cricketers to 1842
- London Cricket Club

== Bibliography ==
- ACS (1981). A Guide to Important Cricket Matches Played in the British Isles 1709–1863. Nottingham: ACS. OCLC 85045528.
- Buckley, G. B. (1935). Fresh Light on 18th Century Cricket. Birmingham: Cotterell & Co. OCLC 23450280.
- Haygarth, Arthur (1997) [1862]. Scores & Biographies, Volume 2 (1827–1840). Kennington: Frederick Lillywhite. ISBN 978-19-00592-23-9.
- Waghorn, H. T. (1899). Cricket Scores, Notes, &c. From 1730–1773. Edinburgh: Blackwood. OCLC 1086375331.
- Waghorn, H. T. (2005) [1906]. The Dawn of Cricket. London: J. W. McKenzie. ISBN 978-09-47821-17-3.
- Webber, Roy (1951). The Playfair Book of Cricket Records. London: Playfair Books Ltd. OCLC 753176177.
