= John Newland (cricketer) =

English cricketer (1717–1804)

John Newland (bapt. 27 July 1717 – 1804) was an English cricketer of the mid-Georgian period who played for Slindon and Sussex under the patronage of Charles Lennox, 2nd Duke of Richmond. He also represented various England teams. He was the middle one of three cricketing brothers, the eldest being Richard Newland, and the youngest Adam Newland.

The earliest mention of John Newland is in a 1740 letter to Thomas Pelham-Holles, 1st Duke of Newcastle by the 2nd Duke of Richmond, referring to him as someone "that you must remember". A top-class player, he made numerous appearances in historically important matches, both eleven-a-side and single wicket.

== Family and background ==
John Newland was born in 1717 (the parish record reads, born and baptised 27 July 1717) at Slindon, Sussex. His parents were Richard Newland Sr of Slindon and Elizabeth Newland (née Hammond) of Eartham, Sussex. They married in 1704 and had ten children, five brothers and five sisters, all born in Slindon. Newland Sr was a yeoman farmer. Two of Newland's brothers, Richard (1713–1778) and Adam (born 1719), also became well-known cricketers. One of the sisters, Susan, married Richard Nyren of Eartham and their eldest son Richard became the famous captain of Hambledon in the 1770s. It is said that the Newlands taught their nephew to play cricket. Susan and her husband were also the grandparents of John Nyren, who wrote The Cricketers of My Time. (Note: Newland's sister Susan was baptised at Slindon on 12 January 1709/10. She was married to Richard Nyren at Binsted on 4 January 1732/33. Richard Newland, John's brother, was baptised at Slindon on 11 September 1713. Adam Newland was baptised on 13 May 1719 at Slindon, on the same day as his brother Henry.)

In a letter from Goodwood House, dated Wednesday, 30 July 1740, to his friend Thomas Pelham-Holles, 1st Duke of Newcastle, the 2nd Duke of Richmond mentioned several local people including "John Newland, that you must remember". This is the first mention in the sources of the Newland brothers. (Note: Newland was 23 at the time, so it may reasonably be assumed that his cricket career began in the mid to late 1730s, but there is no mention of him in that decade's few sources.)

The second recorded mention of the Newlands is in a letter dated 9 July 1741 from the Duchess of Richmond to her husband. She mentions a conversation with John Newland about a Slindon versus East Dean match played a week earlier at Long Down, near Eartham.

According to David Underdown, an ancestor called John Newland was a steward in the local manor house at the end of the sixteenth century. The manor belonged to the Kempe family who were Roman Catholics and, in the seventeenth century, Jacobites; they even had a priest hole in the manor house. Richard Newland Sr was a churchwarden, a position of respectability in Georgian times which meant he was, as Underdown puts it, "a solid member of the village community". Despite this apparent respectability, Underdown points out that Slindon was, like most Sussex villages, a violent place with smuggling connections. The Slindon team included Edward Aburrow Sr (alias "Cuddy"), who played as a bowler and was the village tailor. He gained a reputation for smuggling, though it is more accurate to say that he was jailed in 1745 for bearing arms whilst landing "prohibited goods" at Elmer's Sluice on the Sussex coast. In 1749, Newland himself and his brother Richard were among a group of men indicted for assaulting one Griffith Hughes, though all were discharged, and this incident too may have been connected with smuggling.

== Cricket career ==
=== Duke of Richmond's patronage ===
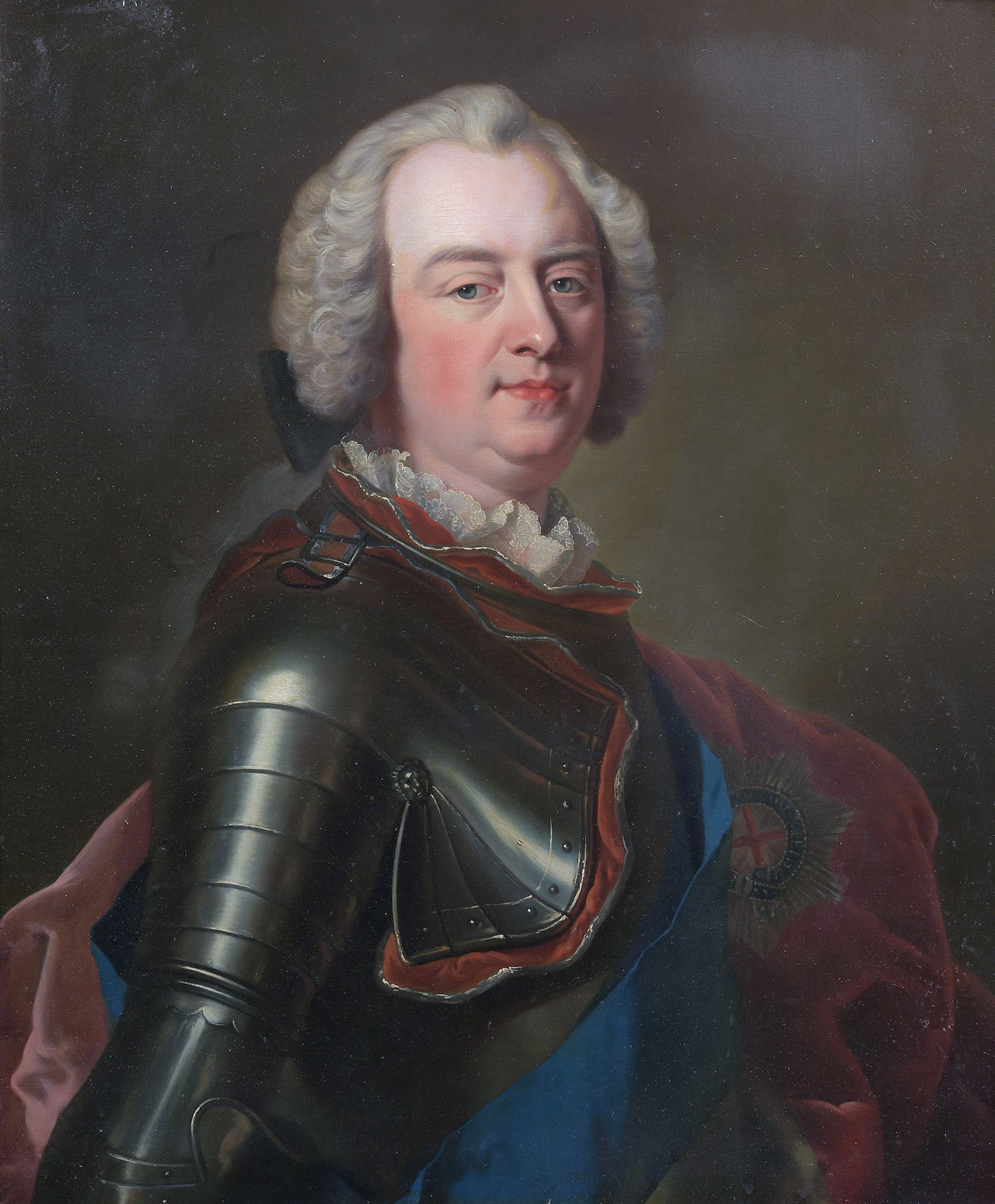
Charles Lennox, 2nd Duke of Richmond

Newland relied for his cricketing opportunities on the 2nd Duke of Richmond, who had captained his own team for many years until he broke a leg in 1733. No longer able to play himself, Richmond channelled his enthusiasm for cricket into his patronage of Slindon Cricket Club. The village of Slindon bordered on his Goodwood House estate. Richmond's commitment to Slindon is evident in letters he wrote to his friend the Duke of Newcastle in 1741. On 28 July, Richmond sent two letters telling Newcastle about a match that day which had resulted in a brawl with "hearty blows" and "broken heads". The match was at Portslade between Slindon, who won, and unnamed opponents. On 7 September, Slindon played Surrey at Merrow Down, near Guildford. Richmond, in a letter to Newcastle before the game, evoked "poor little Slyndon against almost your whole county of Surrey". The next day he wrote again, saying that "wee (sic) have beat Surrey almost in one innings".

Writing about Slindon's matches in 1742, F. S. Ashley-Cooper said the village, near Arundel, had but a few hundred inhabitants. Even so, "it was at one time most famous on account of its cricket". The club's chief players, he said, were "the Newland brothers—Adam, John, and Richard—and Cuddy".

Played for England v Kent at the Artillery Ground on 18 June 1744. Scored 0 & 5*.

If it was played, one of the biggest matches of the 1747 season might have been Long Robin's Nine v William Hodsoll's Ten on the Artillery Ground. Planned for 9 July, it was a "scratch match" arranged by members of the London club. The players were mostly from London, Bromley, Dartford, Hadlow, and Slindon. Long Robin's Nine were Robert Colchin, all three—Adam, John, and Richard—Newland brothers, both—James and John—the Bryant brothers, Little Bennett, John Bowra, and Thomas Jure. Hodsoll's Ten were William Hodsoll, Allen, John Bell, Thomas Bell, Broad, Tom Faulkner, one—either Joe or John—of the Harris brothers, and three players from Hadlow who were John Larkin, Jones, and one unnamed team-mate.

Five of Slindon played four matches in July 1747, all on the Artillery Ground. On the 6th, they met Five of Dartford. This was the result of a challenge by Slindon, published in the Daily Advertiser on Monday, 29 June to play "five of any parish in England, for their own Sum". The announcement advised interested parties: "If it is accepted of by any, they are desir'd to go to Mr Smith, who has Orders to make Stakes for them". The three Newland brothers—Adam, John, and Richard—all played. On Saturday, 4 July, George Smith announced in the same paper that "five of Dartford in Kent, have made Stakes with him, and will play with the above Gentlemen at the Time and Place above mentioned for twenty Pounds". Slindon's next match on the 8th was against Five of Bromley, and this was another game resulting from the challenge. At least one of the Newland brothers played for Slindon. On the 10th and 15th of the month, Slindon played against Five of Hadlow. Details of neither match are known.

== See also ==
- 1740 English cricket season
- 1747 English cricket season
- Adam Newland
- Cricket in Sussex
- Edward Aburrow Sr
- Richard Newland (cricketer)
- Slindon Cricket Club

== Bibliography ==
- Buckley, G. B. (1935). Fresh Light on 18th Century Cricket. Birmingham: Cotterell & Co. OCLC 23450280.
- Maun, Ian (2009). From Commons to Lord's, Volume One: 1700 to 1750. Cambridge: Roger Heavens. ISBN 978-19-00592-52-9.
- McCann, Tim (2004). Sussex Cricket in the Eighteenth Century (PDF). Vol. 88. Lewes: West Sussex Record Office. ISBN 978-08-54450-55-8.
- Underdown, David (2000). Start of Play. Westminster: Allen Lane. ISBN 978-07-13993-30-1 – via Internet Archive.
