= James Bryant (Kent cricketer) =

English cricketer (18th century)

Personal information
- Full name: James Bryant

Domestic team information
- Years: Team
- c.1744 – ?: Bromley Cricket Club
- c.1744 – ?: Kent
- c.1744 – ?: England

James Bryant (dates unknown) was an English cricketer of the mid-Georgian period who played for Bromley and Kent. He also represented various England teams. A top-class player, he made at least 26 appearances in historically important matches, both eleven-a-side and single wicket. (Note: Any match listed in the ACS' Important Match Guide (1981) is historically important, and therefore of the highest standard, whether or not a scorecard might exist. The same applies to numerous matches discovered by researchers since 1981. For further information, see First-class cricket.) He was the brother of John Bryant, also of Bromley, where they were team-mates of Robert Colchin. (Note: Matches at this time were played on rudimentary pitches with a two-stump wicket. The batter used a curved bat and the bowler delivered the ball with an underarm action by bowling it all along the ground. The sport underwent an evolutionary change in the 1760s when bowlers began pitching the ball, still using an underarm action, and the modern straight bat was introduced in response.) (Note: Scorecard data till at least 1825 was never comprehensive, especially the dismissal information: bowling analyses lacked balls bowled and runs conceded; bowlers were not credited with wickets when the batsman was caught or stumped; in many matches, the means of dismissal were omitted.)

Bryant has never been recognised as a bowler, so it must be assumed he was a specialist batsman. It is not known if he was right- or left-handed. If he did bowl, he used an underarm action. The actual length of his career is uncertain, but there were 26 important matches between 1744 and 1751 in which he definitely appeared: 15 eleven-a-side, and eleven under single wicket rules.

== Career ==
=== 1744—first reference ===
In June 1744, 'J. Bryant' (first name not recorded) played for Surrey & Sussex against London at the Artillery Ground, the match which left the world's earliest-known scorecard. He scored 5 and 10 to help his team win by 55 runs. Two weeks later, 'J. Bryant' scored 12 and 7 for England against Kent, also at the Artillery Ground; Kent won by one wicket.

On Monday, 1 October, a three-a-side single wicket match was played on the Artillery Ground "for a considerable sum". Robert Colchin, James Bryant, and Joe Harris played against John Bryant, Val Romney, and Thomas Waymark; the result is unknown. This is the first definite mention of James Bryant in surviving records.

=== 1744—earliest-known stumping ===
The earliest-known instance of a batsman being stumped was in the England v Kent match, when 'J. Bryant' of England was dismissed by George Kipps, the noted Kent wicket-keeper. The surviving match scorecard is the first to include dismissal information.

=== 1745 season ===
Two of the biggest matches of the 1745 season were played 26 June and 5 July on the Artillery Ground. The first was publicised as Long Robin's XI (Note: Robert Colchin was nicknamed 'Long Robin' because of his height.) versus Richard Newland's XI. The teams for the first match were named, some of the players for the first time. No details of the scores were reported, but the result was a victory for Long Robin's XI by "over 70 runs". The match was "arranged by the noblemen and gentlemen of the London Club".

Long Robin's XI were Colchin (captain), Tom Faulkner, James Bryant, Joe Harris, Broad, Hodge, Romney, George Jackson, Robert Lascoe, John Harris, and John Bowra.

Newland's XI were Richard Newland (captain), John Bryant, Norton, Jacob Mann, Little and Tall Bennett, Martin, Howlett, William Anderson, Norris, and Howard.

The fixture was repeated on 5 July, but the players were not named. It was between the same teams but it was publicised differently as "Sevenoaks, Bromley & Addington versus Slindon, Horsmonden, Chislehurst & London". As before, the match was "arranged by the noblemen and gentlemen of the London Club". No details of the play are known, but the result was another win for Long Robin's XI, this time by 5 wickets.

=== 1746 season ===
On 23 June 1746, Kent and Surrey were scheduled to play on the Artillery Ground. Kent's team consisted entirely of players from Bromley, Bexley, and Sevenoaks; they included Colchin, Kipps, Bowra, Robert Eures, and both the Bryant brothers.

=== 1747 season ===
If it was played, one of the biggest matches of the 1747 season might have been Long Robin's Nine v William Hodsoll's Ten on the Artillery Ground. Planned for 9 July, it was a "scratch match" arranged by members of the London club. The players were mostly from London, Bromley, Dartford, Hadlow, and Slindon. Long Robin's Nine were Colchin, all three—Adam, John, and Richard—Newland brothers, both the Bryant brothers, Little Bennett, Bowra, and Thomas Jure. Hodsoll's Ten were William Hodsoll, Allen, John Bell, Thomas Bell, Broad, Faulkner, one—either Joe or John—of the Harris brothers, and three players from Hadlow who were John Larkin, Jones, and one unnamed team-mate.

In early August 1747, there were two single wicket matches at the Artillery Ground which were organised by the 2nd Duke of Richmond. In the first, three of his employees Stephen Dingate, Joseph Rudd, and Pye defeated Little and Tall Bennett, and William Anderson. In the second, the same threes were to play again but in a "fives" match with the two Bryant brothers added to the Duke's team, and with Faulkner and one—either Joe or John—of the Harris brothers to their opponents. The result of the second game is unknown.

== See also ==
- 1745 English cricket season
- 1746 English cricket season
- 1747 English cricket season
- 1748 English cricket season
- 1749 English cricket season
- 1750 English cricket season
- 1751 English cricket season

== Bibliography ==
- ACS (1981). A Guide to Important Cricket Matches Played in the British Isles 1709–1863. Nottingham: ACS. OCLC 85045528.
- Buckley, G. B. (1935). Fresh Light on 18th Century Cricket. Birmingham: Cotterell & Co. OCLC 23450280.
- Haygarth, Arthur (1997) [1862]. Scores & Biographies, Volume 2 (1827–1840). Kennington: Frederick Lillywhite. ISBN 978-19-00592-23-9.
- Light, Rob (2011). "Cricket in the eighteenth century". In Bateman, Anthony; Hill, Jeffrey (eds.). The Cambridge Companion to Cricket (PDF). Cambridge University Press. pp. 26–39.
- Maun, Ian (2009). From Commons to Lord's, Volume One: 1700 to 1750. Cambridge: Roger Heavens. ISBN 978-19-00592-52-9.
- McCann, Tim (2004). Sussex Cricket in the Eighteenth Century (PDF). Vol. 88. Lewes: West Sussex Record Office. ISBN 978-08-54450-55-8.
- Waghorn, H. T. (1899). Cricket Scores, Notes, &c. From 1730–1773. Edinburgh: Blackwood. OCLC 1086375331.
- Waghorn, H. T. (2005) [1906]. The Dawn of Cricket. London: J. W. McKenzie. ISBN 978-09-47821-17-3.
- Webber, Roy (1951). The Playfair Book of Cricket Records. London: Playfair Books Ltd. OCLC 753176177.
- Wilson, Martin (2005). An Index to Waghorn. London: Bodyline Books (limited edition, by subscription only). [ISBN unspecified]
