= William Hodsoll =

English cricketer (1718–1776

William Hodsoll aka Hodswell (1718; christened 28 October 1718 at Ash-next-Ridley, Kent – 30 November 1776 at Ash-next-Ridley), was an English cricketer of the mid-Georgian period, at a time when the single wicket version of the game was popular. He was an outstanding fast underarm bowler. Mainly associated with Dartford and Kent, he also played for England teams. Although information about Hodsoll's career is limited by a lack of surviving data, he was a top-class player who made numerous appearances in historically important matches, both eleven-a-side and single wicket. (Note: Matches at this time were played on rudimentary pitches with a two-stump wicket. The batter used a curved bat and the bowler delivered the ball with an underarm action by bowling it all along the ground. The sport underwent an evolutionary change in the 1760s when bowlers began pitching the ball, still using an underarm action, and the modern straight bat was introduced in response.) (Note: Scorecard data till at least 1825 was never comprehensive, especially the dismissal information: bowling analyses lacked balls bowled and runs conceded; bowlers were not credited with wickets when the batsman was caught or stumped; in many matches, the means of dismissal were omitted.)

Hodsoll lived in Dartford for many years, and was a tanner.

== 1743 ==
Three of Kent v Three of England was a three-a-side single wicket game, played 11 July 1743 on the Artillery Ground. The six players involved were publicised as "the best in England". They were William Hodsoll (Dartford), John Cutbush (Maidstone), and Val Romney (Sevenoaks) playing as Three of Kent; and Richard Newland (Slindon), William Sawyer (Richmond) and John Bryant (Bromley) playing as Three of England. Hodsoll and Newland were the captains.

The Daily Advertiser of Thursday, 7 July 1743 says Thomas Ridgeway of Sussex was to play alongside Hodsoll and Romney. Then, on Friday, 8 July, Cutbush, known to have been a clockmaker from Maidstone, was named instead of Ridgeway. Kent won by 2 runs. The London Evening Post estimated a crowd of 10,000. A return match was arranged at Sevenoaks Vine on 27 July, but "it did not come off".

== 1744 ==
Played for Kent v England at the Artillery Ground on 18 June 1744. Scored 0 & 5* (with Cutbush, one of the final partnership). Took at least 8 wickets in total (4+4), which were all bowled.

According to the description of him in Cricket, An Heroic Poem (1745) by James Love, Hodsoll was a fast underarm bowler, and also a useful batsman. This poem was written to commemorate the famous match between Kent and England at the Artillery Ground in 1744, in which Hodsoll played for Kent.

== 1745 ==
A game between two "threes" was played Monday, 24 June 1745 in the Artillery Ground. The teams were William Hodsoll's Side, which was William Hodsoll (Dartford), Val Romney (Sevenoaks), and Richard Newland (Slindon) versus Long Robin's Side, consisting of Robert Colchin, John Bryant (both of Bromley), and "J. Harris" (Addington). It is not known which of John or Joe Harris was playing. Hodsoll's Side won by 7 runs.

== 1747 ==
If it was played, one of the biggest matches of the 1747 season might have been Long Robin's Nine v William Hodsoll's Ten on the Artillery Ground. Planned for 9 July, it was a "scratch match" arranged by members of the London club. The players were mostly from London, Bromley, Dartford, Hadlow, and Slindon. Long Robin's Nine were Robert Colchin, all three—Adam, John, and Richard—Newland brothers, both—James and John—the Bryant brothers, Little Bennett, John Bowra, and Thomas Jure. Hodsoll's Ten were William Hodsoll, Allen, John Bell, Thomas Bell, Broad, Tom Faulkner, one—either Joe or John—of the Harris brothers, and three players from Hadlow who were John Larkin, Jones, and one unnamed team-mate.

== Last known match ==
Hodsoll's last recorded appearance was for Dartford v England on Dartford Brent on 29 July 1752.

== See also ==
- 1743 English cricket season
- 1744 English cricket season
- 1745 English cricket season
- 1747 English cricket season
- 1749 English cricket season
- 1750 English cricket season
- 1751 English cricket season
- 1752 English cricket season
- Addington Cricket Club
- Dartford Cricket Club
- Edward Aburrow Sr
- History of English cricket (1726–1750)
- List of English cricketers (1701–1786)
- List of Kent county cricketers to 1842
- Richard Newland (cricketer)
- Robert Eures
- Stephen Dingate
- Val Romney
- William Sawyer (cricketer)

== Bibliography ==
- Altham, H. S.; Swanton, E. W. (1962). A History of Cricket, Volume 1 (to 1914) (5th ed.). London: George Allen & Unwin. OCLC 894274808.
- Buckley, G. B. (1935). Fresh Light on 18th Century Cricket. Birmingham: Cotterell & Co. OCLC 23450280.
- Haygarth, Arthur (1996) [1862]. Scores & Biographies, Volume 1 (1744–1826). Kennington: Frederick Lillywhite. ISBN 978-19-00592-23-9.
- Haygarth, Arthur (1997) [1862]. Scores & Biographies, Volume 2 (1827–1840). Kennington: Frederick Lillywhite. ISBN 978-19-00592-23-9.
- Maun, Ian (2011). From Commons to Lord's, Volume Two: 1751 to 1770. Leicester: Martin Wilson. ISBN 978-09-56906-60-1.
- McCann, Tim (2004). Sussex Cricket in the Eighteenth Century (PDF). Vol. 88. Lewes: West Sussex Record Office. ISBN 978-08-54450-55-8.
- Waghorn, H. T. (1899). Cricket Scores, Notes, &c. From 1730–1773. Edinburgh: Blackwood. OCLC 1086375331.
- Webber, Roy (1951). The Playfair Book of Cricket Records. London: Playfair Books Ltd. OCLC 753176177.
- Wilson, Martin (2005). An Index to Waghorn. London: Bodyline Books (limited edition, by subscription only). [ISBN unspecified]
