= William Durling =

English cricketer (c.1725–?)

William Durling (c.1725–?) was an English cricketer of the mid-Georgian period. A specialist batsman, he was a top-class player who made numerous appearances in historically important matches, both eleven-a-side and single wicket. (Note: Any match listed in the ACS' Important Match Guide (1981) is historically important, and therefore of the highest standard, whether or not a scorecard might exist. The same applies to numerous matches discovered by researchers since 1981. For further information, see First-class cricket.) (Note: Scorecard data till at least 1825 was never comprehensive, especially the dismissal information: bowling analyses lacked balls bowled and runs conceded; bowlers were not credited with wickets when the batsman was caught or stumped; in many matches, the means of dismissal were omitted.) Although he is believed to have come from Kent, he was mainly associated with Addington and Surrey, and was mentioned in match reports from 1748 to 1761. He also played for England, and was often a given man to help weaker teams. Durling was a shoemaker by trade. Little is known of his life outside cricket, and he is not mentioned in sources after his last known match in 1761.

== Career ==
=== 1748 season ===
A "fives" game on Monday, 5 June 1748, took place on the Artillery Ground between Addington and The Rest, excluding Kent. Addington's players were Tom Faulkner, Joe Harris, John Harris, George Jackson, and Durling (described as "the shoemaker that lately came out of Kent"). Their opponents were Stephen Dingate, Little Bennett, Maynard, Collins, and Thomas Waymark. This appears to be the first time that a team specifically called "The Rest" was ever assembled.

On Wednesday, 27 July 1748, there was another "fives" game between the Faulkner and Dingate teams on the Artillery Ground. Faulkner's team won. This match may have been a decider; in which case Dingate's team must have won the second match on Friday, 15 July. The teams were not the same as before: Dingate, Richard Newland, Joseph Rudd, Maynard (of Surrey), and Little Bennett played against Faulkner, Joe Harris, Durling (of Addington), James and John Bryant.

Tom Faulkner's Five defeated Long Robin's Five on Monday, 29 August 1748, by four runs. The match was played at the Artillery Ground for a prize of £200. Val Romney was badly injured and could not run but, the rules being play or pay, he was obliged to play as well as he could. The teams were Faulkner, Joe Harris, James Bryant, John Bryant, and Durling against Colchin, Romney, Maynard, John Larkin, and Jones.

In 1748, Romney is recorded in two single wicket matches. On 8 August, he and Colchin opposed Tom Faulkner and Joe Harris at "twos" in the Artillery Ground for twenty guineas a team. On 29 August, he took part in a "fives" game at the Artillery Ground in which Tom Faulkner's Side won against Long Robin's Side by four runs. The prize was 200 pounds. Romney was injured but chose to play, possibly because rules stated one was to either "play or pay". The teams were Faulkner, Joe Harris, James Bryant, John Bryant, and Durling versus Colchin, Romney, John Larkin, Jones, and Maynard.

=== 1749 season ===
England played Surrey twice in June 1749. The first match was on Dartford Brent and Surrey won by 2 wickets. England scored 89 and 42; Surrey replied with 73 and 59/8. No individual performances are known. England had Durling of Addington, which is in Surrey, as a given man; Surrey had James and John Bryant (both of Bromley) as given men. In the second match on the Artillery Ground, the result was a draw after England scored 71 and 47. Surrey scored 89 in their first innings but bad light prevented them chasing their target of 30. Presumably the match had to be finished (or left unfinished) on the one day. A report said the two teams were unchanged from the previous match.

On Monday, 10 July 1749, Five of England defeated Five of Addington. The match was played for 50 guineas a side, and was the result of a challenge by the Addington players to meet any other five in England. Betting was 8–1 in favour of Addington.

Addington: Tom Faulkner, Joe Harris, John Harris, George Jackson, and Durling.
England: Robert Colchin, John Bryant, Robert Eures, John Bell, and Thomas Waymark.

A return match was played Monday, 17 July, both teams the same, and Addington won. The prize was again fifty guineas. A decider was played Wednesday, 26 July, which England won by 2 runs. They scored 11 and 12; Addington replied with 16 and 5. The prize this time was 100 guineas. England had made two changes to their team with James Bryant and Val Romney replacing Bell and Waymark. Addington's five were unchanged.

In eleven-a-side cricket, the two biggest matches of the 1749 season were between England and Surrey. The first was played 2–3 June on Dartford Brent, and Surrey won by 2 wickets. England scored 89 and 42; Surrey replied with 73 and 59–8. No individual performances are known. England had Durling of Addington, which is in Surrey, as a given man; Surrey had John and James Bryant as given men. The Bryants were natives of Bromley in Kent. John Frame, who played for Surrey, was later associated with Dartford, but he was actually born in Surrey, at Warlingham in 1733.

The second match was played 5 June on the Artillery Ground, and ended in a draw. England scored 71 and 47. Surrey scored 89 in their first innings, but bad light prevented them chasing their target of 30. Presumably, the match had to be finished (or left unfinished) on the one day. No individual performances are known. The two teams were unchanged from the match on 2 and 3 June.

Members of London Cricket Club arranged two select XI matches on the Artillery Ground, the first on 26 June 1749 was between Long Robin's XI and Stephen Dingate's XI for 100 guineas a side, the second on 28 August between Long Robin's XI and Tom Faulkner's XI for sixty guineas a side. Durling played for Long Robin's XI on 26 June, but was not involved in the second match.

=== 1750 season ===
During September 1750, there was a series of "fives" between Stephen Dingate's Five and Tom Faulkner's Five. All three matches were played on the Artillery Ground. The first match on Monday, 10 September was played for fifty guineas. Faulkner's Five won this one. The teams were:

- Stephen Dingate, James Bryant, John Bryant, John Bell, and Thomas Bell
- Tom Faulkner, Joe Harris, John Harris, Durling, and Perry.

The second match on Friday, 14 September ended in a tie, both teams totalling nine. As single-wicket rules applied, all batsmen were out. It is known they were all bowled (but not by whom), except for Dingate who was caught in the second innings; Thomas Bell, who was run out in the second innings; and Joe Harris who was caught in the second innings while he was apparently trying to hit the winning run.

The third and deciding game on Monday, 17 September was won by Faulkner's Five by an innings and one run. Dingate's Five scored 10 and 18, but Faulkner's Five scored 29. The individual figures in the recorded score of the Dingate second innings add up to 20, but 18 was definitely the correct total so one or more of the individual scores was wrong.

=== 1752 season ===
In 1752, Addington played two matches against Westminster, and one against Dartford. Both of the Westminster matches were played at Tothill Fields, Westminster, on 20 July and 3 August. The first match is result unknown, and Westminster won the second by 10 runs. Westminster's team on 20 July included Stephen Dingate, William Anderson, Little Bennett, Tall Bennett, Perry, and John Capon. The Addington team included John Mansfield, George Jackson, John Frame, Durling, Joe Harris, and John Harris.

Addington's match against Dartford was set for 12 August 1752 on Addington Hills, but the outcome is unknown.

=== 1756 season ===
In The Dawn of Cricket, H. T. Waghorn records a pre-announcement that a "fives" game involving Hambledon would be played on Saturday, 28 August 1756 at the Artillery Ground. The Hambledon players are unnamed but their opponents were a strong team: Tom Faulkner, Joe Harris, John Frame, John Bell, and Durling. No details of the result were recorded. Stakes were £20 a side.

London v Dartford. The teams met twice in September 1756, but neither result is known. The first, 6 September on the Artillery Ground, was played for £50 a side. London had John Bryant, Joe Harris, Durling, and George Smith playing for them. The notice for that match confirmed that the second match would be played 9 September "on Dartford Brim (sic) by the same gentlemen".

=== 1759 season ===
Three matches between Dartford and England were played in September from the 5th to the 12th. The first two were on Dartford Brent, the third on Laleham Burway. In all three matches, Dartford had Tom Faulkner and Gascoigne of London as given men. Dartford won the first match, and England the second, both by unknown margins. The deciding match was scheduled for Wednesday, 12 September, according to an announcement in the Whitehall Evening Post the previous day. Dartford won that by 3 wickets.

Arthur Haygarth refers to this "tri-series" on page 2 of Scores & Biographies, but only to the two games won by Dartford. He appears to believe that only those two games were played. He found the names of the players in Bell's Life, dated 23 November 1845, but no scores. Bell's Life stated that the matches took place in 1765, and Haygarth says another account has 1762, but it is evident that G. B. Buckley has got the dates (and the sequence) right as above.

Dartford's team, evidently unchanged in all three games, was: Tom Faulkner, Gascoigne (both London, and given men), John Frame, John Bell (wicket-keeper), Potter (long stop), Thomas Brandon, Thomas Bell, Goldstone, Killick, Stephens/Stevens, and Wakelin. There were several players called Stephens or Stevens during this period, including Lumpy.

The England team, also apparently unchanged, was: Burchwood (Kent), John Edmeads (Surrey), Edward Gill (Buckinghamshire, wicket-keeper), Thomas Woods (Surrey, long stop), Stephen Harding (Surrey), John Haynes (Surrey), Durling (Addington), Saunders (Berkshire), Allen (Middlesex), Nyland (Sussex), and Cheeseman (Sussex).

The main bowlers were stated to be Faulkner and Frame for Dartford; and Burchwood and Edmeads for England. Edmeads was still playing for Chertsey and Surrey in the 1770s. Edward Gill of Buckinghamshire is the wicket-keeper in the scorecarded Hampshire v England match of June 1772.

=== 1761 season ===
In its edition of Thursday, 3 September, the General Evening Post announced an odds game in Essex with 22 of the county to play against the Dartford XI. This is the first known instance of 22 playing against 11, a common odds format in the 19th century, especially in matches between local teams and the All England Eleven. Dartford were to have Tom Faulkner and Durling as given men.

That is the last time Durling is mentioned in the surviving records.

== Bibliography ==
- ACS (1981). A Guide to Important Cricket Matches Played in the British Isles 1709–1863. Nottingham: ACS. OCLC 85045528.
- Buckley, G. B. (1935). Fresh Light on 18th Century Cricket. Birmingham: Cotterell & Co. OCLC 23450280.
- Buckley, G. B. (1937). Fresh Light on pre-Victorian Cricket. Birmingham: Cotterell & Co. OCLC 23469107.
- Haygarth, Arthur (1996) [1862]. Scores & Biographies, Volume 1 (1744–1826). Kennington: Frederick Lillywhite. ISBN 978-19-00592-23-9.
- Haygarth, Arthur (1997) [1862]. Scores & Biographies, Volume 2 (1827–1840). Kennington: Frederick Lillywhite. ISBN 978-19-00592-23-9.
- Maun, Ian (2011). From Commons to Lord's, Volume Two: 1751 to 1770. Leicester: Martin Wilson. ISBN 978-09-56906-60-1.
- Waghorn, H. T. (2005) [1906]. The Dawn of Cricket. London: J. W. McKenzie. ISBN 978-09-47821-17-3.
- Webber, Roy (1951). The Playfair Book of Cricket Records. London: Playfair Books Ltd. OCLC 753176177.
