= Thomas Jure =

English cricketer (18th century)

Thomas Jure played for London as a specialist batsman, and is mentioned in match reports from 1747 to 1749. A top-class player, he made numerous appearances in historically important matches, both eleven-a-side and single wicket. (Note: Any match listed in the ACS' Important Match Guide (1981) is historically important, and therefore of the highest standard, whether or not a scorecard might exist. The same applies to numerous matches discovered by researchers since 1981. For further information, see First-class cricket.) (Note: Scorecard data till at least 1825 was never comprehensive, especially the dismissal information: bowling analyses lacked balls bowled and runs conceded; bowlers were not credited with wickets when the batsman was caught or stumped; in many matches, the means of dismissal were omitted.)

== Career ==
=== 1747 season ===
If it was played, one of the biggest matches of the 1747 season might have been Long Robin's Nine v William Hodsoll's Ten on the Artillery Ground. Planned for 9 July, it was a "scratch match" arranged by members of the London club. The players were mostly from London, Bromley, Dartford, Hadlow, and Slindon. Long Robin's Nine were Robert Colchin, all three—Adam, John, and Richard—Newland brothers, both—James and John—the Bryant brothers, Little Bennett, John Bowra, and Thomas Jure. Hodsoll's Ten were William Hodsoll, Allen, John Bell, Thomas Bell, Broad, Tom Faulkner, one—either Joe or John—of the Harris brothers, and three players from Hadlow who were John Larkin, Jones, and one unnamed team-mate.

In two later matches, Jure played for England against Kent on 31 August, at the Artillery Ground; and on 2 September, on Bromley Common.

On Saturday, 5 September 1747, there was a three-a-side single wicket game at the Artillery Ground between Long Robin's Three and Stephen Dingate's Three. The teams were Robert Colchin (alias Long Robin), John Harris, and Val Romney against Stephen Dingate, Richard Newland, and Thomas Jure. It was played for 60 guineas per side, and the players were specially chosen from those who had played in the Kent v England games above, so possibly they were the best performers in those matches. It was ruled that "all Strokes behind as well as before Wickets" counted, and in this respect the contest "differs from any Three Match ever play'd".

=== 1749 season ===
Jure is not mentioned in the 1748 sources. He is known to have played once in 1749. On 26 June, he was a member of Stephen Dingate's XI against Long Robin's XI at the Artillery Ground. The result is unknown.

== See also ==
- History of English cricket (1726–1750)
- Val Romney
- 1747 English cricket season
- 1749 English cricket season
- List of Kent county cricketers to 1842

== Bibliography ==
- ACS (1981). A Guide to Important Cricket Matches Played in the British Isles 1709–1863. Nottingham: ACS. OCLC 85045528.
- Haygarth, Arthur (1997) [1862]. Scores & Biographies, Volume 2 (1827–1840). Kennington: Frederick Lillywhite. ISBN 978-19-00592-23-9.
- Maun, Ian (2009). From Commons to Lord's, Volume One: 1700 to 1750. Cambridge: Roger Heavens. ISBN 978-19-00592-52-9.
- McCann, Tim (2004). Sussex Cricket in the Eighteenth Century (PDF). Vol. 88. Lewes: West Sussex Record Office. ISBN 978-08-54450-55-8.
- Webber, Roy (1951). The Playfair Book of Cricket Records. London: Playfair Books Ltd. OCLC 753176177.
