= John Larkin (cricketer) =

English cricketer (1726–1782

Personal information
- Born: 1726; Hadlow, Kent
- Died: 1782 (aged 55–56)
- Role: batsman

Domestic team information
- Years: Team
- 1747–1749: Hadlow

John Larkin (born in 1726, probably at Hadlow in Kent; died in 1782) was a noted English cricketer of the mid-Georgian period at a time when the single wicket version of the game was popular. A top-class player, he made numerous appearances in historically important matches, (Note: Any match listed in the ACS' Important Match Guide (1981) is historically important, and therefore of the highest standard, whether or not a scorecard might exist. The same applies to numerous matches discovered by researchers since 1981. For further information, see First-class cricket.) both eleven-a-side and single wicket. A specialist batsman, he is mostly associated with Hadlow and Kent. He also played for England.

== Career ==
Larkin played for "the most famed parish of Hadlow", as the Hadlow Cricket Club was called in 1747, when he is first recorded in surviving sources. He and another Hadlow player called Jones represented England v Kent at the Artillery Ground on 31 August 1747 (the result is unknown). Larkin is recorded in seven historically important matches between 1747 and 1749. These were three eleven-a-side matches in 1747, a single wicket event in 1748, and three more eleven-a-sides in 1749. The full span of his career is unknown.

=== 1747 season ===
Two games between Kent and England were due to be played at Bromley Common on Monday, 29 June, and at the Artillery Ground on Wednesday, 1 July, but both matches were "deferred on account of the gentlemen subscribers being engaged at several Elections". The parliamentary election of 1747 resulted in a Whig government under Henry Pelham (1694–1754). In those days, voting was limited to male landed gentry.

The match on the Artillery Ground was re-arranged for 31 August, and the Bromley Common one for 2 September. Most of the players were from one of eight clubs: Addington, Bexley, Bromley, Dartford, Hadlow, London, Sevenoaks, and Slindon. The Daily Advertiser announced the teams on 31 August:

- England: Richard Newland (Slindon), Green (Amberley, Sussex), Stephen Dingate, Little Bennett, Thomas Jure (all London), Tom Faulkner, Joe Harris, Broad, George Jackson (all Addington), William Sawyer (Richmond), and Maynard (Surrey).
- Kent: Robert Colchin, James Bryant, John Bryant (all Bromley), Val Romney, George Kipps, John Mansfield (all Sevenoaks), John Bell, Thomas Bell (both Dartford), Jones, John Larkin (both Hadlow), and Robert Eures (Bexley).

Both matches are "result unknown". The source also carried a statement by George Smith, the Artillery Ground keeper: "The Town may be certain that the taking Six-pence Admittance is out of no avaricious Temper. Two-pence being greatly insufficient to the Charge that attends the Matches, which Mr Smith is ready and willing to make appear to any Gentleman".

If it was played, one of the biggest matches of the 1747 season might have been Long Robin's Nine v William Hodsoll's Ten on the Artillery Ground. Planned for 9 July, it was a "scratch match" arranged by members of the London club. The players were mostly from London, Bromley, Dartford, Hadlow, and Slindon. Long Robin's Nine were Robert Colchin, all three—Adam, John, and Richard—Newland brothers, both—James and John—the Bryant brothers, Little Bennett, John Bowra, and Thomas Jure. Hodsoll's Ten were William Hodsoll, Allen, John Bell, Thomas Bell, Broad, Tom Faulkner, one—either Joe or John—of the Harris brothers, and three players from Hadlow who were John Larkin, Jones, and one unnamed team-mate.

=== 1748 season ===
Tom Faulkner's Five defeated Long Robin's Five on Monday, 29 August, by four runs. The match was played at the Artillery Ground for a prize of £200. Val Romney was badly injured and could not run but, the rules being play or pay, he was obliged to play as well as he could. The teams were Faulkner, Joe Harris, James Bryant, John Bryant, and William Durling against Colchin, Romney, Maynard, Larkin, and Jones.

=== 1749 season ===
Members of London Cricket Club arranged two select XI matches on the Artillery Ground; the first on 26 June was between Long Robin's XI and Stephen Dingate's XI for 100 guineas a side. The result is unknown.

- Long Robin's XI: Robert Colchin, John Bryant, James Bryant, John Bell, John Mansfield, Robert Eures, Val Romney, William Durling, John Colchin, John Bowra, and John Larkin.
- Stephen Dingate's XI: Stephen Dingate, Tom Faulkner, Joe Harris, John Harris, George Jackson, John Frame, Humphreys, Little Bennett, Tom Peake, John Capon, and Thomas Jure.

John Larkin is not mentioned in sources after this match. He was still only 23 at the time. He died in 1782, aged 55 or 56.

== Bibliography ==
- ACS (1981). A Guide to Important Cricket Matches Played in the British Isles 1709–1863. Nottingham: ACS. OCLC 85045528.
- Maun, Ian (2009). From Commons to Lord's, Volume One: 1700 to 1750. Cambridge: Roger Heavens. ISBN 978-19-00592-52-9.
- McCann, Tim (2004). Sussex Cricket in the Eighteenth Century (PDF). Vol. 88. Lewes: West Sussex Record Office. ISBN 978-08-54450-55-8.
