= John Harris (Surrey cricketer) =

English cricketer (18th century)

John Harris was an English cricketer of the mid-Georgian period who played for Addington and Surrey. He also represented various England teams. A top-class player, he made at least 23 appearances in historically important matches, both eleven-a-side and single wicket. (Note: Any match listed in the ACS' Important Match Guide (1981) is historically important, and therefore of the highest standard, whether or not a scorecard might exist. The same applies to numerous matches discovered by researchers since 1981. For further information, see First-class cricket.) He was the brother of Joe Harris, also of Addington, where they were team-mates of William Durling and Tom Faulkner. (Note: Matches at this time were played on rudimentary pitches with a two-stump wicket. The batter used a curved bat and the bowler delivered the ball with an underarm action by bowling it all along the ground. The sport underwent an evolutionary change in the 1760s when bowlers began pitching the ball, still using an underarm action, and the modern straight bat was introduced in response.) (Note: Scorecard data till at least 1825 was never comprehensive, especially the dismissal information: bowling analyses lacked balls bowled and runs conceded; bowlers were not credited with wickets when the batsman was caught or stumped; in many matches, the means of dismissal were omitted.)

Harris is the original holder of the world record for the highest known individual score, by virtue of having made top score (47) in the earliest match that has left any individual scores. He was a specialist batsman, probably a regular opener. It is not known if he was right- or left-handed. The actual length of his career is uncertain, but there were 23 important matches between 1744 and 1754 in which he definitely appeared: 13 eleven-a-side, and ten under single wicket rules.

== Career ==
=== 1744 season ===
John Harris is first mentioned as a player in the June 1744 match which left the world's oldest scorecard. He played for the combined Surrey and Sussex team against London at the Artillery Ground on 2 June, making scores of 18 and 47. There is no dismissal information on the scorecard. Surrey & Sussex won by 55 runs. Harris' brother Joe, a bowling all-rounder, was also playing for Surrey & Sussex.

This is the earliest match from which any individual scores are known. The oldest known team scores date from 1731. As the top score on the world's oldest scorecard, Harris' innings of 47 on 2 June is the highest on record from then until 15–16 July 1745, when it was overtaken by Richard Newland, who scored 88 playing for England against Kent at the Artillery Ground.

The Harrises then played for England against Kent at the Artillery Ground on 18 June. John scored 0 and 4. The scorecard from this match does give limited dismissal information, and it is known that 'Harris' bowled four Kent batsmen in the first innings and three in the second. It may reasonably be assumed that Joe Harris took the wickets as he was a recognised bowler, while John was a specialist batsman. The scorecard similarly failed to differentiate between the Mills and Newland brothers in terms of bowling.

=== 1745 season ===
A game between two "threes" was played Monday, 24 June 1745 in the Artillery Ground. The teams were William Hodsoll's Side, which was William Hodsoll (Dartford), Val Romney (Sevenoaks), and Richard Newland (Slindon) versus Long Robin's Side, consisting of Robert Colchin (Long Robin), John Bryant (both of Bromley), and 'J. Harris' (Addington). It is not known which of John or Joe Harris was playing. Hodsoll's Side won by 7 , Norton, Jacob Mann, Little Bennett, Martin, Howlett, Tall Bennett, William Anderson, Norris, and Howard.

The fixture was repeated on 5 July, but the players were not named. It was between the same teams but it was publicised differently as "Sevenoaks, Bromley & Addington versus Slindon, Horsmonden, Chislehurst & London". As before, the match was "arranged by the noblemen and gentlemen of the London Club". No details of the play are known, but the result was another win for Long Robin's XI, this time by 5 wickets.

=== 1746 season ===
On 6 August 1746, there was a three-a-side game between Long Robin's Side and Stephen Dingate's Side in the Artillery Ground involving "six players esteemed the best in England". The teams were Robert Colchin, John Bryant (both Bromley), and Joe Harris (Addington) versus Stephen Dingate (Surrey), Val Romney (Sevenoaks), and Richard Newland (Slindon). Dingate's team won the match. Hundreds of pounds were lost and won over the game. Newspapers pre-announcing the event named John Harris in Long Robin's team, but it was his brother Joe who actually played.

=== 1747 season ===
If it was played, one of the biggest matches of the 1747 season might have been Long Robin's Nine v William Hodsoll's Ten on the Artillery Ground. Planned for 9 July, it was a "scratch match" arranged by members of the London club. The players were mostly from London, Bromley, Dartford, Hadlow, and Slindon. Long Robin's Nine were Robert Colchin, all three—Adam, John, and Richard—Newland brothers, both—James and John—the Bryant brothers, Little Bennett, John Bowra, and Thomas Jure. Hodsoll's Ten were Hodsoll, Allen, John Bell, Thomas Bell, Broad, Tom Faulkner, one—either Joe or John—of the Harris brothers, and three players from Hadlow who were John Larkin, Jones, and one unnamed team-mate.

In early August 1747, there were two single wicket matches at the Artillery Ground which were organised by the 2nd Duke of Richmond. In the first, three of his employees Stephen Dingate, Joseph Rudd, and Pye defeated Little and Tall Bennett, and William Anderson. In the second, the same threes were to play again but in a "fives" match with the two—James and John—Bryant brothers added to the Duke's team, and with Tom Faulkner and one—either Joe or John—of the Harris brothers to their opponents. The result of the second game is unknown.

On Saturday, 5 September 1747, there was a three-a-side game at the Artillery Ground between Long Robin's Three and Stephen Dingate's Three. The teams were Robert Colchin (alias Long Robin), John Harris, and Val Romney against Stephen Dingate, Richard Newland, and Thomas Jure. It was played for sixty guineas per side, and the players were specially chosen from those who had played in the Kent v England games above, so possibly they were the best performers in those matches. It was ruled that "all Strokes behind as well as before Wickets" counted, and in this respect the contest "differs from any Three Match ever play'd".

== See also ==
- History of English cricket (1726–1750)
- 1744 English cricket season
- Richard Newland (cricketer)
- List of first-class cricket records
- Val Romney
- 1745 English cricket season
- 1746 English cricket season
- 1747 English cricket season
- 1748 English cricket season
- 1749 English cricket season
- 1750 English cricket season
- 1751 English cricket season
- 1752 English cricket season

== Bibliography ==
- ACS (1981). A Guide to Important Cricket Matches Played in the British Isles 1709–1863. Nottingham: ACS. OCLC 85045528.
- Haygarth, Arthur (1996) [1862]. Scores & Biographies, Volume 1 (1744–1826). Kennington: Frederick Lillywhite. ISBN 978-19-00592-23-9.
- Haygarth, Arthur (1997) [1862]. Scores & Biographies, Volume 2 (1827–1840). Kennington: Frederick Lillywhite. ISBN 978-19-00592-23-9.
- Maun, Ian (2009). From Commons to Lord's, Volume One: 1700 to 1750. Cambridge: Roger Heavens. ISBN 978-19-00592-52-9.
- McCann, Tim (2004). Sussex Cricket in the Eighteenth Century (PDF). Vol. 88. Lewes: West Sussex Record Office. ISBN 978-08-54450-55-8.
- Waghorn, H. T. (1899). Cricket Scores, Notes, &c. From 1730–1773. Edinburgh: Blackwood. OCLC 1086375331.
- Webber, Roy (1951). The Playfair Book of Cricket Records. London: Playfair Books Ltd. OCLC 753176177.
