= Little and Tall Bennett =

English cricketers (18th century)

Little and Tall Bennett were two English brothers who played cricket in the mid-Georgian period. Their first names are not on record, as they were always referenced by their nicknames, or as Bennett. The Bennetts were top-class players who were involved in historically important matches, both eleven-a-side and single wicket, for a decade or more. (Note: Any match listed in the ACS' Important Match Guide (1981) is historically important, and therefore of the highest standard, whether or not a scorecard might exist. The same applies to numerous matches discovered by researchers since 1981. For further information, see First-class cricket.)

They are both acknowledged to have been outstanding batsmen, and were mainly associated with London Cricket Club. The brothers also played for Surrey and England. Little Bennett is recorded in a total of 22 matches between the 1745 and 1755 seasons. Over the same timespan, Tall Bennett is recorded in twelve matches. There are three other matches between the 1744 and 1749 seasons in which a player called Bennett is recorded without differentation.

== Careers ==
=== First mention ===
The first mention of a player called Bennett is in cricket's earliest-known scorecard, which was created on 2 June 1744 for the London v Surrey & Sussex match at the Artillery Ground. Bennett, who is fifth in the London batting order, scored 11 and 7. Surrey & Sussex won by 55 runs.

=== 1745 season ===
The Bennetts are first named individually ahead of two matches played 26 June and 5 July 1745 on the Artillery Ground. These were was "arranged by the noblemen and gentlemen of the London Club". The first was publicised as Long Robin's XI v Richard Newland's XI, and the brothers were listed as "Little Bennett" and "Tall Bennett" in Newland's XI. No details of the scores have been found, but the result was a victory for Long Robin's XI by "over 70 runs".

The fixture was repeated on 5 July. Although the players were not named, it was between the same teams. However, it was publicised differently as "Sevenoaks, Bromley & Addington versus Slindon, Horsmonden, Chislehurst & London". Again, no details of the play are known, but the result was another win for Long Robin's XI, this time by 5 wickets.

Also in 1745, a combined Addington & Lingfield team were due to play twice against Surrey on 22 July and 16 September, both matches on the Artillery Ground. John Bryant and Little Bennett were to be given men for Surrey.

=== 1747 season ===
If it was played, one of the biggest matches of the 1747 season might have been Long Robin's Nine v William Hodsoll's Ten on the Artillery Ground. Planned for 9 July, it was a "scratch match" arranged by members of the London club. The players were mostly from London, Bromley, Dartford, Hadlow, and Slindon. Long Robin's Nine were Robert Colchin, all three—Adam, John, and Richard—Newland brothers, both—James and John—the Bryant brothers, Little Bennett, John Bowra, and Thomas Jure. Hodsoll's Ten were William Hodsoll, Allen, John Bell, Thomas Bell, Broad, Tom Faulkner, one—either Joe or John—of the Harris brothers, and three players from Hadlow who were John Larkin, Jones, and one unnamed team-mate.

In early August 1747, there were two single wicket matches at the Artillery Ground which were organised by the 2nd Duke of Richmond. In the first, three of his employees Stephen Dingate, Joseph Rudd, and Pye defeated Little and Tall Bennett, and William Anderson. In the second, the same threes were to play again but in a "fives" match with the two—James and John—Bryant brothers added to the Duke's team, and with Tom Faulkner and one—either Joe or John—of the Harris brothers to their opponents. The result of the second game is unknown.

== Legacy ==
Both of the Bennetts were highly regarded as batsmen. According to a contemporary article about Robert Colchin in The Connoisseur (no. 132, dated 1746):

His greatest excellence is cricket-playing, in which he is reckoned as good a bat as either of the Bennetts.

== Bibliography ==
- ACS (1981). A Guide to Important Cricket Matches Played in the British Isles 1709–1863. Nottingham: ACS. OCLC 85045528.
- Buckley, G. B. (1935). Fresh Light on 18th Century Cricket. Birmingham: Cotterell & Co. OCLC 23450280.
- Maun, Ian (2009). From Commons to Lord's, Volume One: 1700 to 1750. Cambridge: Roger Heavens. ISBN 978-19-00592-52-9.
- Maun, Ian (2011). From Commons to Lord's, Volume Two: 1751 to 1770. Leicester: Martin Wilson. ISBN 978-09-56906-60-1.
- McCann, Tim (2004). Sussex Cricket in the Eighteenth Century (PDF). Vol. 88. Lewes: West Sussex Record Office. ISBN 978-08-54450-55-8.
- Waghorn, H. T. (1899). Cricket Scores, Notes, &c. From 1730–1773. Edinburgh: Blackwood. OCLC 1086375331.
- Waghorn, H. T. (2005) [1906]. The Dawn of Cricket. London: J. W. McKenzie. ISBN 978-09-47821-17-3.
