= Thomas Waymark =

English cricketer (1705–?)

Personal information
- Born: June 1705; Mitcham, Surrey
- Batting: Right-handed
- Bowling: Right arm fast medium (underarm)
- Role: All-rounder

Domestic team information
- Years: Team
- c.1725–c.1740: Sussex
- c.1741–c.1750: Berkshire

Thomas Waymark (probably baptised 17 June 1705; date of death unknown) was an English professional cricketer in the first half of the 18th century. Although he was associated with cricket in Sussex and Berkshire, Waymark was probably born in or near Mitcham, Surrey, in June 1705. He is one of the earliest-known players on record, and is widely accounted the sport's first great all-rounder. Waymark played for over 20 years and was noted for his "extraordinary agility and dexterity". A top-class player, he made numerous appearances in historically important matches, both eleven-a-side and single wicket. (Note: Matches at this time were played on rudimentary pitches with a two-stump wicket. The batter used a curved bat and the bowler delivered the ball with an underarm action by bowling it all along the ground. The sport underwent an evolutionary change in the 1760s when bowlers began pitching the ball, still using an underarm action, and the modern straight bat was introduced in response.) (Note: Scorecard data till at least 1825 was never comprehensive, especially the dismissal information: bowling analyses lacked balls bowled and runs conceded; bowlers were not credited with wickets when the batsman was caught or stumped; in many matches, the means of dismissal were omitted.)

== Duke of Richmond's XI ==
Surviving details of Waymark's life are few, but it is likely that he began his cricket career during the 1720s. The earliest definite mention of him is in the 1730 season when a match between the 2nd Duke of Richmond's XI, and Sir William Gage's XI was postponed "on account of Waymark, the Duke's man, being ill". In contemporary sources, he was described as "the famous Waymark".

Waymark was employed as a groom by the Duke of Richmond on his estate at Goodwood. He owed the job, in part at least, to his cricketing ability. This type of arrangement, between patron and professional, became common in the 18th century. In later years, Lumpy Stevens and John Minshull were employed by their patrons as a gardener and a gamekeeper respectively.

When Richmond and Alan Brodrick drew up Articles of Agreement for their matches in 1727, one of the clauses included the right of Brodrick to select "any Gamesters within three Miles of Pepperhara, provided they actually lived there last Lady Day". Lady Day usually fell on 25 March which, until 1752, was New Year's Day. Derek Birley wrote that Lady Day was significant as "the usual hiring day for new servants". Richmond and Brodrick both had servants in their teams, including Waymark in Richmond's team.

== Sir William Gage's XI ==
On 28 August 1729, Edwin Stead's XI met Sir William Gage's XI at Penshurst Park. Waymark played for Gage's team, who are believed to have gained the earliest known innings victory. Gage's XI was also known as Hampshire, Surrey & Sussex. A newspaper report says Gage's XI "got as many within 3 in one Hand, as the former did in two, so the Kentish men flung it up". A "hand" was a team's innings but the report is confusing because Stead's XI must have batted last, and they apparently conceded the match when still three runs behind—therefore Gage's XI won by an innings and three runs. Waymark, described as "a groom of the Duke of Richmond" was the outstanding player. The report says he "signalised himself by extraordinary agility and dexterity" and "turned the scale of victory".

== 1740s ==
By the 1740s, Waymark was working at Bray Mills in Berkshire as a miller where he was employed by a Mr Darville.

He is known to have played in a number of matches during the 1740s, including both of the 1744 matches of which the scorecards have survived.

On 2 June 1744, he played for London v Surrey & Sussex (backed by his old employer Richmond) at the Artillery Ground. The match has left the earliest-known scorecard, which records that Waymark made 13 runs in the first innings, and 16 in the second. Surrey & Sussex won by 55 runs.

Then, on 18 June 1744, Waymark played for England against Kent at the Artillery Ground in the match which commences Arthur Haygarth's Scores & Biographies. He made scores of 7 & 9. With Kent needing three runs to win, and with one wicket remaining, Waymark is reported to have "missed a catch" which would have ended the match in his team's favour; Kent went on to win.

== Single wicket ==
Waymark was a noted single wicket player. This was the most lucrative form of cricket in the 1740s, and he took part in several big money contests.

There was a three-a-side match on Monday, 1 October 1744, played "for a considerable sum" by players who had previously been described as the "best in England". The teams were Robert Colchin, James Bryant, and Joe Harris against John Bryant, Val Romney, and Waymark.

On Monday, 21 July 1746, there was a four-a-side match at the Artillery Ground between Four Millers of Bray Mills (in Berkshire) and Four Best Players of Addington. It was played for fifty pounds but the result is unknown. Waymark was by this time employed at Bray Mills, and so he was almost certainly involved.

In 1748, Waymark and Colchin played two "doubles" matches against Tom Faulkner and Joe Harris at the Artillery Ground. At the time, these four were arguably the best players in England. The matches were played for huge prizes of fifty guineas each. Waymark and Colchin won them both, the first by 12 runs, and the second by an unrecorded margin.

== End of career ==
The last matches Waymark is known to have played took place in July 1749 when he played in a series of three single wicket "fives" matches against Addington, although Waymark did not play in the third match. He is known to have umpired a match later in the year involving the sons of the Duke of Richmond, but there are no other references to him. It is not known when he died.

== Bibliography ==
- Birley, Derek (1999). A Social History of English Cricket. London: Aurum Press. ISBN 978-18-54107-10-7 – via Internet Archive.
- Buckley, G. B. (1935). Fresh Light on 18th Century Cricket. Birmingham: Cotterell & Co. OCLC 23450280.
- Haygarth, Arthur (1996) [1862]. Scores & Biographies, Volume 1 (1744–1826). Kennington: Frederick Lillywhite. ISBN 978-19-00592-23-9.
- Haygarth, Arthur (1997) [1862]. Scores & Biographies, Volume 2 (1827–1840). Kennington: Frederick Lillywhite. ISBN 978-19-00592-23-9.
- Light, Rob (2011). "Cricket in the eighteenth century". In Bateman, Anthony; Hill, Jeffrey (eds.). The Cambridge Companion to Cricket (PDF). Cambridge University Press. pp. 26–39.
- Major, John (2007). More Than A Game. London: HarperCollins. ISBN 978-00-07183-64-7 – via Internet Archive.
- Maun, Ian (2009). From Commons to Lord's, Volume One: 1700 to 1750. Cambridge: Roger Heavens. ISBN 978-19-00592-52-9.
- McCann, Tim (2004). Sussex Cricket in the Eighteenth Century (PDF). Vol. 88. Lewes: West Sussex Record Office. ISBN 978-08-54450-55-8.
- Waghorn, H. T. (1899). Cricket Scores, Notes, &c. From 1730–1773. Edinburgh: Blackwood. OCLC 1086375331.
- Waghorn, H. T. (2005) [1906]. The Dawn of Cricket. London: J. W. McKenzie. ISBN 978-09-47821-17-3.
- Webber, Roy (1951). The Playfair Book of Cricket Records. London: Playfair Books Ltd. OCLC 753176177.
- Wilson, Martin (2005). An Index to Waghorn. London: Bodyline Books (limited edition, by subscription only). [ISBN unspecified]
