= Playfair Cricket Monthly =

Playfair Cricket Monthly was a monthly British cricket magazine that ran from April 1960 to April 1973, when it was absorbed by The Cricketer. Its comprehensive statistical content was taken on by The Cricketer Quarterly. It was edited by Gordon Ross and – until his death in 1962 – Roy Webber. The magazine took its name from the already existing Playfair Cricket Annual, also edited by Ross.

Neville Cardus wrote an essay each month for a number of years. Some of these were collected in book form in 1963 as The Playfair Cardus. Other regular features were 'The Homes of Cricket', player profiles and a digest of match scores. It had a higher pictorial content than The Cricketer but rarely strayed beyond first-class or Test cricket.
