= Slindon =

Village and parish in West Sussex, England

Coordinates: 50.86739°N 0.63515°W

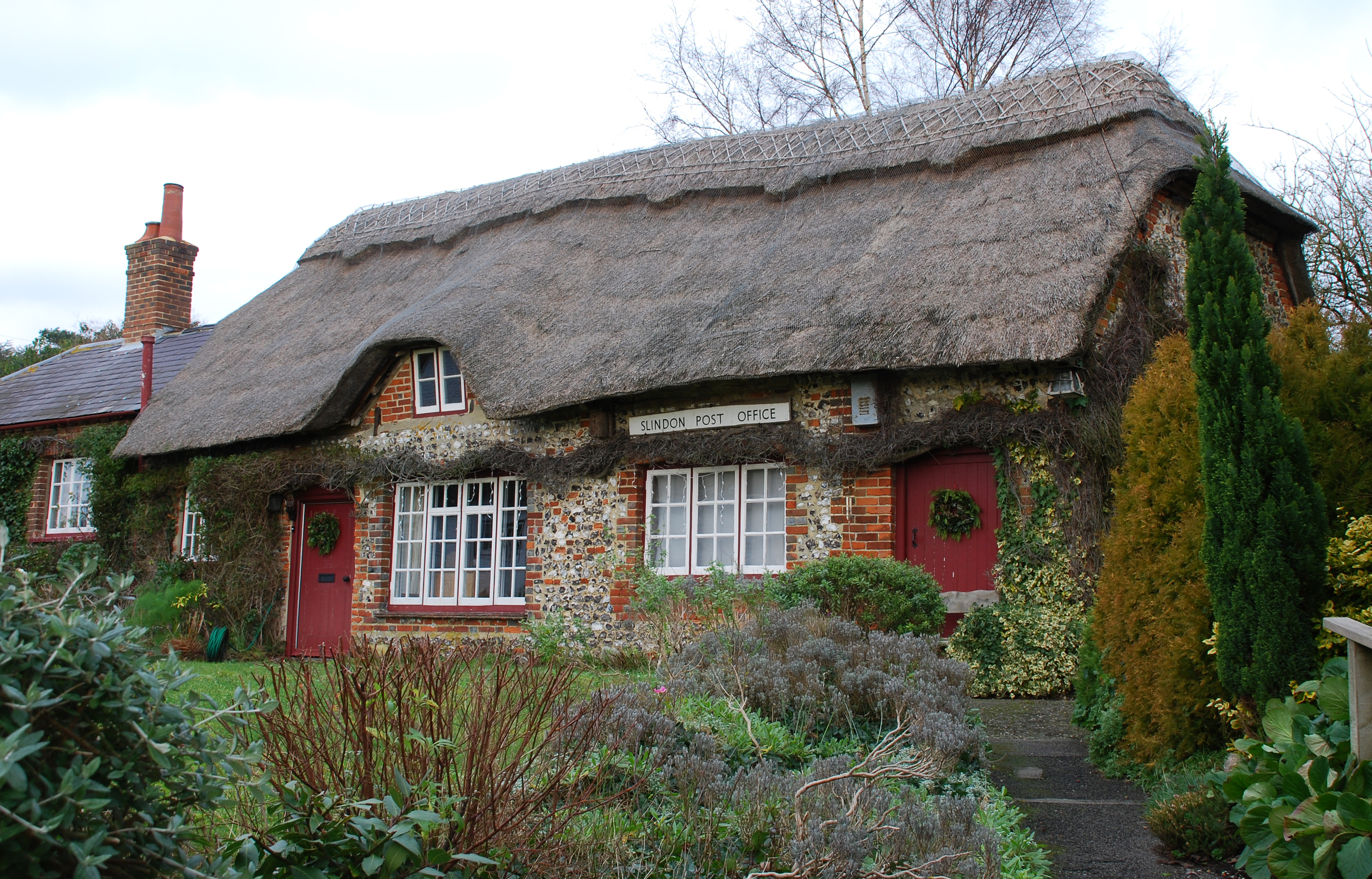
- Slindon post office

- Location within West Sussex
- Area: 12.87 km^{2} (4.97 sq mi)
- Population: 595 (Civil Parish.2011)
  - Density: 46/km^{2} (120/sq mi)
- OS grid reference: SU961084
  - London: 49 miles (79 km) NNE
- Civil parish: Slindon
- District: Arun
- Shire county: West Sussex
- Region: South East
- Country: England
- Sovereign state: United Kingdom
- Post town: ARUNDEL
- Postcode district: BN18
- Dialling code: 01243
- Police: Sussex
- Fire: West Sussex
- Ambulance: South East Coast
- UK Parliament: Arundel and South Downs

Slindon is a mostly rural village and civil parish in the Arun District of West Sussex, England, containing a developed nucleus amid woodland. Much of Slindon's woodland belongs to the National Trust on the southern edge of the escarpment of the South Downs National Park. Slindon is centred six miles (9.7 km) north-east of Chichester.

Within the village is situated two schools, Slindon Church of England Primary School, a state funded primary school for boys and girls aged 4–11, and Slindon College, a specialist independent day and boarding school for boys aged 8–18, which officially opened in 1972.

== History ==
The village is listed in the Domesday Book of 1086 as Eslindone, the name having the probable meaning in Old English of 'sloping hill'. The Domesday Book records Slindon as having 35 households, putting it in the top 20% of settlements.

St Mary's 12th-century parish church contains a memorial to Stephen Langton (c. 1150–1228), the Archbishop of Canterbury who attended the signing of Magna Carta and who died in Slindon.

In the Middle Ages Slindon House (now Slindon College) was the site of one of the Archbishop's residences. In 1330, Thomas de Natindon, who was a legal representative of the Pope, was sent there to serve a writ on the archbishop. His party were not well received by the archbishop's servants who stripped and bound them, then threw cold water over them, apparently with the archbishop's consent. Natindon escaped revenge and was pursued over the hills to Petworth where he was caught and held in prison for three days.

The village war memorial was unveiled in 1921, with the names of 14 residents killed in World War I; a further three names were added after World War II.

The writer Hilaire Belloc (1870–1953) grew up in the village.

In the mid-18th century, Slindon Cricket Club achieved fame through the excellence of its team which featured Richard Newland (1713–1778).

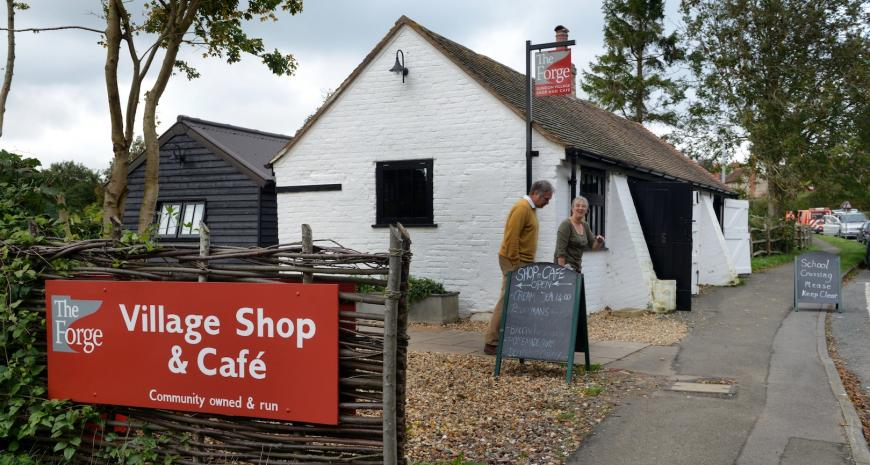

== Amenities ==
In May 2012, the process began of renovating and converting the old village forge into a shop, café and information centre; this opened on 16 October 2012.

The village has been called the "pumpkin capital of Britain", and an annual display of pumpkins attracts tourists to the village.

A short walk from the village is Nore Folly (aka Slindon Folly), a structure built during the 18th century by the Newburgh family, whose seat was at Slindon. The Folly resembles a gateway but leads to nowhere.

=== Former amenities ===
Slindon post office closed in 2008. (Note: The nearest post office is at Barnham.) The Newburgh Arms closed in 2001.

== Notes and references ==
Notes
