= Pitched delivery bowling =

Type of bowling in cricket

In cricket in the early 1760s, there was an evolutionary transition from the sport's 'pioneering phase' to its 'pre-modern phase' when bowlers began to bowl pitched deliveries by pitching the ball towards the wicket, instead of rolling or skimming it along the ground as they had previously done. The essential bowling action was still underarm but the introduction of a ball travelling through the air, coupled with a bounce, was a key point of evolution in the sport's history, especially as it was the catalyst for the invention of the straight bat, which replaced the old curved style. It was the first of three keypoint evolutions in bowling: the others were the introduction of the roundarm style in the 1820s, and overarm in the 1860s.

== Bowling versus throwing ==
Rowland Bowen reasoned that there was a clear difference between rolling and pitching in terms of 'true bowling' and 'true throwing'. The former meant rolling or skimming the ball along the ground; the latter meant an underarm throw. Bowen explained 'true throwing' as the means of 'propelling a ball other than by rolling it' (his italics).

== John Nyren's evidence ==
In John Nyren's Memoranda (1832), he wrote the following account of the England v Kent match at the Artillery Ground in 1744:

It arose from a challenge given by Lord John Sackville on the part of the County of Kent to play all England; and it proved to be a well contested match as will appear from the manner in which the players kept the field. The hitting however could neither have been of a high character nor indeed safe, as may be gathered from the figure of the bat at that time; which was similar to an old-fashioned dinner knife, curved at the back and sweeping in the form of a volute at the front and end. With such a bat the system must have been all for hitting; it would be barely possible to block and when the practice of bowling length balls was introduced and which gave the bowler so great an advantage in the game it became necessary to change the form of the bat. It was therefore made strait in the pod (sic). Some years after this the fashion of the bat having been changed to a strait form the system of stopping and blocking was adopted.

This is effectively all that can be found in early sources about the introduction of the 'length ball', and the consequent development of the 'strait' bat. The evolution occurred after 1744 and before 1770. Given the rise of Hambledon from the mid-1760s, it is believed to have happened c. 1760 during the Seven Years' War in which there was a discernible lull in important matches, certainly in terms of known matches until after the war ended in early 1763.

== Different styles of play ==
Whereas roundarm and overarm were highly controversial, and were introduced in the face of fierce opposition, there is nothing in the historical records which precisely dates the introduction of pitching, and nothing which indicates that it was controversial. The two eras are bridged by the career (1749 to 1774) of John Frame, one of the game's first great fast bowlers, who played with pioneers like Thomas Waymark, Richard Newland, and Robert Colchin at the beginning of his career; and the likes of John Small and Lumpy Stevens at the end.

As described in History of cricket to 1725, early cricketers played in their everyday clothes and had no protective equipment such as gloves or pads. A 1743 painting by Francis Hayman of a game in progress, the ball is bowled underarm along the ground, as in bowls, at varying speed towards a wicket consisting of two stumps mounted by a single crosspiece. The batsman addresses the delivery with a bat that resembles a modern hockey stick, this shape being ideal for dealing with a ball on the ground. (Note: The painting is Francis Hayman's Cricket as Played at the Artillery Ground (1743). It hangs in the Lord's Pavilion.)

When the ball was bowled along the ground, the batsman used his curved bat to attack it and try to hit it away, usually with the intention of lofting it over the fielders. There was, as such, no defensive technique other than the most rudimentary and instinctive attempt to stop a ball that had deceived him. The pitched delivery made the curved bat obsolete, and the straight bat lent itself to the deployment of a defensive stroke. As the aim of the batsman with a curved bat was to hit the ball over the fielders, low scores were normal. If he did not time his shot correctly, the chances were high that he would miss the ball, and be bowled or stumped; or else, if he hit it poorly, he would not clear the fielder and be caught out. In addition, the pitches of the time were little more than rough tracks which were permanently exposed to the weather, and so conditions were invariably to the bowler's advantage.

== Influence of Hambledon ==
Although the Hambledon Club is widely and erroneously called the 'Cradle of Cricket', it can at least, wrote F. S. Ashley-Cooper, 'claim to have been the centre in which the game was first brought to a certain degree of perfection and was developed in several respects to its lasting advantage'. In the first illustration of his book, Ashley-Cooper depicted a curved bat, labelling it: 'The type of bat used in the earlier Hambledon matches'. This indicates his belief that the straight bat was invented after Hambledon became a noted team. Ashley-Cooper believed that the club was founded in the early 1750s, but it is possible that it was only a loose parish organisation at that time, and that the club per se was not formally constituted until the 1760s. Certainly a team representing Hambledon played Dartford, one of the country's most accomplished teams, in 1756.

It seems, therefore, that the innovations of pitched delivery and straight bat were introduced just at the time when Hambledon came to the fore, and so perhaps, as Ashley-Cooper suggested, Hambledon qualifies as the 'cradle' of a new code of cricket. It has been suggested, certainly in speculation, that John Small invented the straight bat, though it may be more accurate to suggest that he was the first to master its use. With the transition from the pioneering era of cricket, Hambledon saw in a new 'pre-modern' phase defined by underarm pitching which lasted until the introduction of roundarm bowling in the years following the Napoleonic Wars. It is not known who first bowled a pitched delivery, or when, or where, but it is likely that the style was developed primarily at Hambledon, although the leading bowler of the 1760s and 1770s, Lumpy Stevens, played for Chertsey and Surrey.

== Bibliography ==
- Ashley-Cooper, F. S. (1924). Hambledon Cricket Chronicle: 1772–1796. London: Jenkins. OCLC 38498574.
- Bowen, Rowland (1970). Cricket: A History of its Growth and Development. London: Eyre & Spottiswoode. ISBN 978-04-13278-60-9.
- Haygarth, Arthur (1996) [1862]. Scores & Biographies, Volume 1 (1744–1826). Kennington: Frederick Lillywhite. ISBN 978-19-00592-23-9.
- Maun, Ian (2009). From Commons to Lord's, Volume One: 1700 to 1750. Cambridge: Roger Heavens. ISBN 978-19-00592-52-9.
- Nyren, John (1998) [1832]. Mote, Ashley (ed.). The Cricketers of my Time. London: Robson Publishing. ISBN 978-18-61051-68-4.
