= Bexley Cricket Club =

Bexley Cricket Club was founded in 1805 at the Manor Way ground in Bexley Village. The present ground in Manor Way has been in use by the club since 1866. The club has historically been one of the strongest in South-East England, having been Kent Cricket League champions in 1996 and 2021, appearing in two Evening Standard Challenge Trophy finals. and winning the ECB National Club Cricket Championship in 2022, beating Nantwich Cricket Club by one run in the final at Lord's. Bexley fields six teams on a Saturday, all playing league cricket, and two on a Sunday. For the first time in 2010, Bexley fielded a Ladies team. The club also has a Colts section for players ages 9–17.

Members of Bexley Cricket Club who have gone on to play test cricket for England include Rob Key, Min Patel, James Tredwell and Arthur Wellard. England disabled cricketer Frederick Dove is also associated with the club.
