= David Underdown =

British historian (1925–2009)

David Edward Underdown (19 August 1925 – 26 September 2009) was a historian of 17th-century English politics and culture and Professor Emeritus at Yale University. Born at Wells, Somerset, Underdown was educated at the Blue School and Exeter College, Oxford. The books Revel, Riot, and Rebellion and Fire from Heaven won prizes from the North American Conference on British Studies and the New England Historical Association. After retiring from Yale in 1996, Underdown wrote a well-received book about the history of cricket in the Hambledon era, Start of Play.

According to The Guardian:

His most famous study, Pride's Purge: Politics in the Puritan Revolution (1971), is a narrative of the tangle of events that took place in England during the late 1640s and led to the purge of the Long Parliament and the execution of King Charles I. Almost four decades on, the book remains a fixture of undergraduate reading lists. Underdown went on to pioneer the study of local history, popular politics, gender and sport.

Historian Phil Withington argued in 2015 that Underdown's sense of localism has been superseded by new scholarship, as has his sense of popular culture. The 1985 book on Revel, Riot and Rebellion and The Social History of Politics was an:

early attempt to ... build a new narrative of popular political participation and activism. But in doing so, it drew a straightforward and somewhat unlikely chain of causality between locale, cultural practices and conflict, and national political allegiances after 1642 – a chain all the more suspect if the sturdy concepts of localism and popular culture out of which it was forged are found to be a little rusty. The book now appears to rest on major fallacies and misinterpretations.

John Morrill argues that Revel, Riot and Rebellion received much less enthusiastic reviews compared to Underdown's earlier and later books. He concludes it is a book that was either published too early or too late.

== Books by Underdown ==
This is a partial list:

- Somerset in the Civil War and Interregnum Newton Abbot, 1973.
- Fire from Heaven: Life in an English Town in the Seventeenth Century. 1992.
- A Freeborn People: Politics and the Nation in Seventeenth-Century England. 1996.
- Pride's Purge: Politics in the Puritan Revolution. Oxford, 1971.
- Revel, Riot, and Rebellion: Popular Politics and Culture in England, 1603–1660. OUP, 1985.
- Royalist Conspiracy in England, 1649–1660. New Haven, 1960.
- Start of Play: Cricket and Culture in Eighteenth-Century England. 2000.

== Articles by Underdown ==
- 'A Case Concerning Bishops' lands: Cornelius Burges and the Corporation of Wells', Eng H.R.lxxviii (1963) 18-48
- 'The Chalk and the Cheese: Contrasts among the English Clubmen', P&Pno.85 (Nov 1979), 25-48
- 'Honest Radicals in the Counties, 1642–1649', in Puritans and Revolutionaries, ed. Pennington and Thomas, pp. 186–205.
- 'The Problem of Popular allegiance in the Civil War', TRHS5th Ser., xxxi (1981), 69-94.
- 'The Taming of the Scold: The Enforcement of the Patriarchal Authority in Early Modern England', in Order and Disorder in Early Modern England, ed. Anthony Fletcher and John Stevenson, Cambridge (1985), ch.4.
