= George Smith (groundskeeper) =

18th-century cricketer and groundskeeper of the Artillery Ground

George Smith (died Monday 29 June 1761 at The Castle in Marlborough) was an English cricketer and also the "keeper" (i.e., strictly speaking a leaseholder) of the Artillery Ground, which was cricket's main venue in London during the mid-Georgian period.

Smith was the landlord of the neighbouring Pyed Horse Inn, through which admittance to the Artillery Ground was compulsory. He was an occasional player in matches but he seems to have been one who "made the numbers up". His real significance was his role as groundkeeper during the 1740s until 1752. Smith had a number of well-publicised problems over the years, especially around admission fees and security. It is possible that several planned matches were cancelled whenever the Honourable Artillery Company demanded its ground back or, as often occurred, simply took umbrage. Smith was sometimes accused of having breached the terms of his lease and these instances may have been due to crowd control issues, which was a frequent problem at big matches, or perhaps to do with excessive gambling.

He had numerous problems with money. In 1747, he issued a statement that: "These matches being attended with great Charge the Door, for the Future, will be Six-pence; Two-pence not being sufficient to defray the Expence". Followed by another that: "The Town may be certain that the taking Six-pence Admittance is out of no avaricious Temper. Two-pence being greatly insufficient to the Charge that attends the Matches, which Mr Smith is ready and willing to make appear to any Gentleman".

In 1748, he declared bankruptcy. Evidently his pricing problems of recent years did have some basis in needing to balance the books after all. A number of notices appeared in the press during the first six months of 1748 but Smith eventually resolved his problems, perhaps through the sale of other property, and was able to retain control of the Artillery Ground until 1752.

On Thursday 27 February 1752, the Daily Advertiser reported that George Smith of the Artillery Ground has taken the late Duke of Somerset's house at Marlborough and intends to open it as an inn. Smith offered the Artillery Ground and its dwelling house, etc. on lease for 7 years. He had evidently overcome his bankruptcy problems.

On Saturday 30 May 1752, the Daily Advertiser carried another notice re the Artillery Ground that "gentlemen may be supplied with bats and balls", and that "the ground is kept in good order for play by your humble servant William Sharpe".

On Thursday 2 July 1761, the Whitehall Evening Post reported the death of Mr George Smith on Monday 29 June at The Castle in Marlborough. The report stated that he was formerly the keeper of the Artillery Ground and the landlord of the adjoining Pyed Horse in Chiswell Street.

== Bibliography ==
- Buckley, G. B. (1935). Fresh Light on 18th Century Cricket. Birmingham: Cotterell & Co. OCLC 23450280.
