= F. S. Ashley-Cooper =

English cricket historian

Frederick Samuel Ashley-Cooper
- F.S. Ashley-Cooper
- Born: 22 March 1877; Bermondsey, London
- Died: 31 January 1932 (aged 54); Milford, Surrey
- Occupations: Cricket historian, statistician
- Notable work: Cricket Magazine

Frederick Samuel Ashley-Cooper (born c. 22 March 1877 in Bermondsey, London; died 31 January 1932 in Milford, near Godalming, Surrey) was a cricket historian and statistician.

According to Wisden, Ashley-Cooper wrote "103 books and pamphlets on the game ... besides a very large amount of matter including 40,000 biographical or obituary notices". For more than thirty years he was responsible for "Births and Deaths" and "Cricket Records" in Wisden; between 1887 and 1932 the Records section of the Almanack had grown from two pages to sixty-one pages. Frail and short-sighted, he never played cricket, and seldom watched, but his "total involvement in the game almost precluded every other interest".

== Books ==
His most notable works were:

- At the Sign of the Wicket (1900)—reproducing notices of known matches played 1742 to 1751.
- Sussex Cricket and Cricketers (1901)
- Curiosities of First-Class Cricket 1730-1901 (1901)
- Nottinghamshire Cricket and Cricketers (1923)
- The Hambledon Cricket Chronicle 1772-1796 (1924)
- Cricket Highways and Byways (1927) (essays)
- Kent Cricket Matches 1719-1880 (1929)

== See also ==
- Variations in first-class cricket statistics
