= Hadlow Cricket Club =

Historical English cricket team

Coordinates: 51.236°N 0.342°E

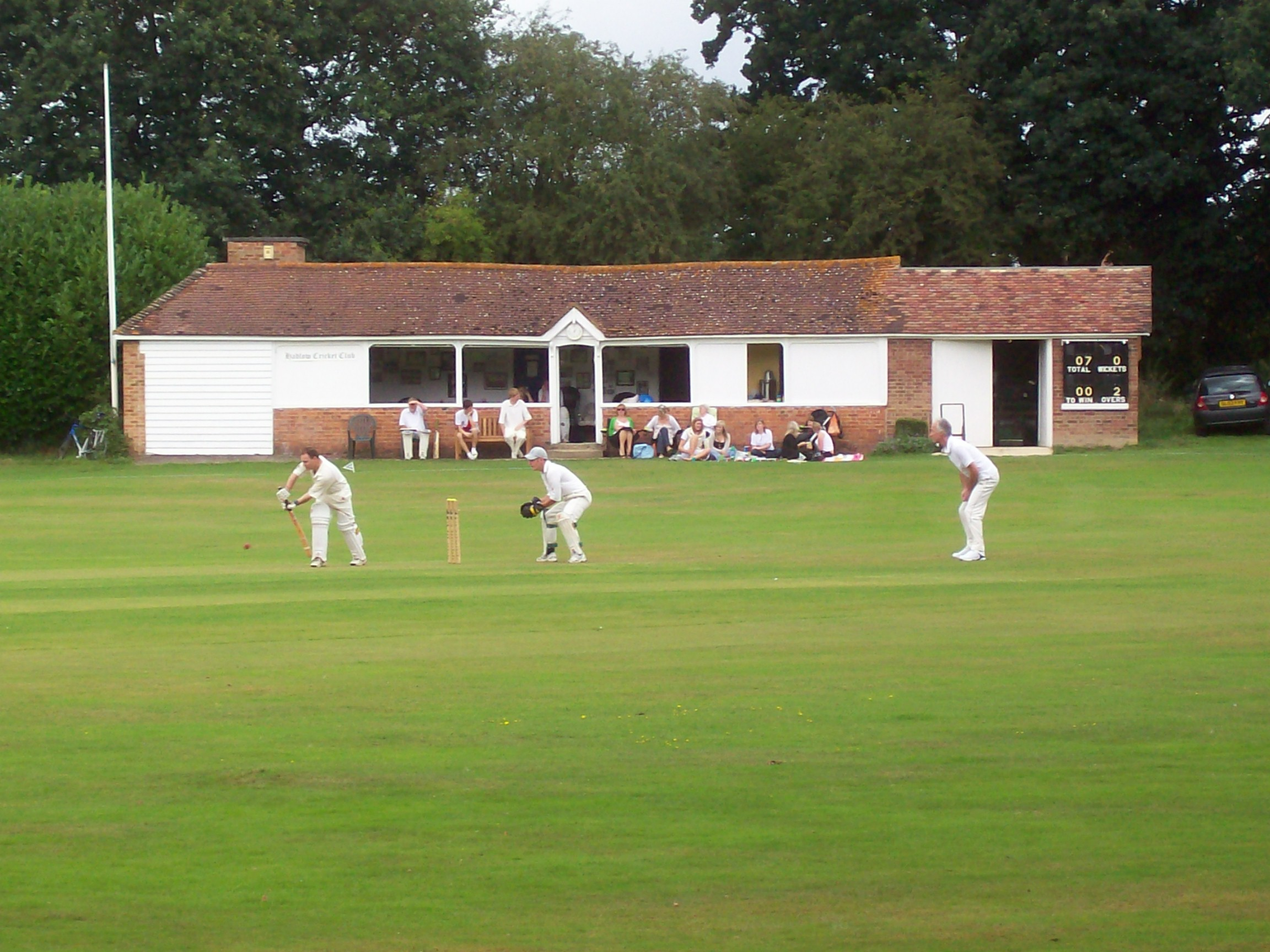
- The pavilion

Team information
- Established: before 1747
- Last match: 1751
- Home venue: Hadlow cricket ground

History
- Notable players: John Larkin

Hadlow Cricket Club was one of the early English cricket clubs, formed in the early to mid-eighteenth century. Hadlow is a village in the Medway valley near Tonbridge in Kent. In the 1747 English cricket season, it was stated in contemporary sources, later published by F. S. Ashley-Cooper, to be "a famous parish for cricket".

== The historical club ==
The Penny London Post of 1 July that year announced a match to be played next day on Dartford Breach (sic), for two guineas a man, between Hadlow and Dartford as "the deciding match". There was no report of the outcome, and no reports have been found of previous fixtures.

Commenting on Hadlow, David Underdown said it was one of several small towns in which "village cricket seems to have flourished". Recognition of the Hadlow team was confirmed when an historically important match took place at the Artillery Ground on 9 July 1747. The teams were Long Robin's XI and William Hodsoll's XI. Included in Hodsoll's XI were: "Larkin and two others of the most famous parish of Hadlow, in Kent". The following day, also on the Artillery Ground, "Five of Hadlow" opposed "Five of Slindon", the legendary Sussex club that had issued challenges to the rest of England. The teams met again on the 15th. None of the results are known.

Hadlow then played London on 24 August, also at the Artillery Ground, and Ashley-Cooper said:

Hadlow, which is near Tonbridge in Kent, was stated to be "a famous parish for cricket".

On 31 August 1747, when Kent played against England at the Artillery Ground, its team included Larkin and a player called Jones, also of Hadlow. The last known mention of the original Hadlow club is a match against Addington on 1 June 1751.

== The modern club ==
Cricket is still played at Hadlow. The modern club was first mentioned in 1819. Its present ground is located off Common Road, to the north of the village. The pavilion dates from 1864, and cost £42.10s to build. Hadlow have teams in the Kent County Village League.

== Bibliography ==
- Buckley, G. B. (1935). Fresh Light on 18th Century Cricket. Birmingham: Cotterell & Co. OCLC 23450280.
- Buckley, G. B. (1937). Fresh Light on pre-Victorian Cricket. Birmingham: Cotterell & Co. OCLC 23469107.
- Maun, Ian (2009). From Commons to Lord's, Volume One: 1700 to 1750. Cambridge: Roger Heavens. ISBN 978-19-00592-52-9.
- McCann, Tim (2004). Sussex Cricket in the Eighteenth Century (PDF). Vol. 88. Lewes: West Sussex Record Office. ISBN 978-08-54450-55-8.
- Underdown, David (2000). Start of Play. Westminster: Allen Lane. ISBN 978-07-13993-30-1 – via Internet Archive.
- Waghorn, H. T. (2005) [1906]. The Dawn of Cricket. London: J. W. McKenzie. ISBN 978-09-47821-17-3.
