= Roy Webber =

Cricket historian (1914–1962)

Roy Webber (died 14 November 1962 aged 48) was a British cricket Scorer and statistician. After World War II, in which he served with the Royal Air Force, he decided to turn what had been his hobby into his profession. He had the necessary proficiency with figures, having previously been an accountant. He was the scorer for BBC Television's Test coverage for many years. He edited The Cricket Annual in 1961 and 1962. He was joint editor of the magazine Playfair Cricket Monthly and wrote a number of cricket books. He also wrote for the News Chronicle and the Daily Mail.

He married twice. His first was c. 1940 to Margaret Winiefred Bentley. They had two children: Patience Margaret (1942) and Nigel Emary Roy (1943). They divorced c. 1946. Second marriage was c. 1952 was to Daphne Goodacre, with whom he had no children.

He died of a heart attack, and was buried at Golders Green Crematorium.

== Bibliography ==
He wrote the following books (as well as contributing statistical appendices to a number of books by other authors):

- Webber's Cricket Year Book, 1946–47 & 1947–48, Privately Published.
- The Playfair Book of Cricket Records, Playfair Books, 1951.
- Who's Who in World Cricket, Hodder & Stoughton, 1952, with updated edition in 1954.
- The Playfair Book of Test Cricket, Playfair Books, 1952 and 1954.
- The Australians in England: A record of the 21 Australian cricket tours of England, 1878 to 1953, Hodder & Stoughton, 1953.
- The County Cricket Championship: A history of the competition from 1873 to the present day, Phoenix House, 1957.
- Phoenix History of Cricket, Dent, 1960, ISBN 978-0-460-07804-7.
- Concise Book of Cricket Records, Phoenix House, 1963.
- Armchair Cricket co-author with Brian Johnston

A brief biography of Webber, in the form of a booklet of 31 pages, was written by Irving Rosenwater:

- Roy Webber, statistician, Christopher Saunders, 2001, ISBN 978-0-9531944-5-2 .
