= Scratch team =

Sports team brought together on a temporary basis

A scratch team is a team, usually in sport, brought together on a temporary basis, composed of players who normally play for different sides. A game played between two scratch teams may be called a scratch match.

The earliest instance of the term "scratch team" recorded by the Oxford English Dictionary is a restaurant guide in 1851 (London at table, by an anonymous author, referring to "'a scratch team' of servants"). The OED also records the term "scratch match" – defined as an impromptu game played by scratch teams – being used in the same year in Rev. James Pycroft's The Cricket Field – one of the earliest books about cricket – "...that is the time that some sure, judicious batsman, whose eminence is little seen amidst the loose hitting of a scratch match, comes calmly and composedly to the wicket and makes a stand;..."

Another early and notable use of the term is from 1874, when The Wanderers, who had just lost an FA Cup match for the first time, were due to play a match against Upton Park. In the words of the contemporary report, "unfortunately the Wanderers failed to put in an appearance. In order, therefore not to disappoint a large number of people who had assembled to witness the play, a scratch team was chosen to represent the missing team." The match was lost, 11–0, with each of the opposing team scoring a goal.."

The term is listed in the 1913 Nelson's Encyclopedia, among slang terms.

The Barbarians is an example of a rugby club that only fields scratch (invitational) teams.

== See also ==
- All-star game, involving the best players in a sports league drawn from various teams
- Exhibition game, sometimes called a "friendly" or "scrimmage"
- Street football (American), usually played by scratch
