= Dartford Cricket Club =

Historical English cricket team

Team information
- Established: 1727
- Home venue: Dartford Brent; Hesketh Park

History
- Notable players: William Bedle; Edwin Stead; John Frame

Dartford Cricket Club is one of the oldest cricket clubs in England with origins which date from the early 18th century, perhaps earlier. The earliest known match involving a team from Dartford took place in 1722, against London, but the club's own website says it was formally established in 1727. The club is still in existence, and now plays in the Kent Cricket League.

== History ==
Dartford players were reckoned by Robert Harley, Earl of Oxford, writing in his diary in 1723, to "lay claim to the greatest excellence" among English cricketers. The club played a number of big matches against London and, in 1756, they were involved in a tri-series against the sport's rising power, the Hambledon Club.

Dartford produced several famous players in the 18th century including cricket's earliest known great player William Bedle. The leading cricket patron Edwin Stead was also associated with Dartford. Later players included William Hodsoll, John Bell, John Frame, and Ned Wenman.

The club originally used Dartford Brent, an area of common land, as its ground. By the end of the 18th century it had moved to Bowman's Lodge on Dartford Heath before its current ground at Hesketh Park was established in 1905. In 2002, the club merged with Dartford Halls Cricket Club, retaining the name Dartford Cricket Club for its First XI.

== Bibliography ==
- ACS (1981). A Guide to Important Cricket Matches Played in the British Isles 1709–1863. Nottingham: ACS. OCLC 85045528.
- Maun, Ian (2009). From Commons to Lord's, Volume One: 1700 to 1750. Cambridge: Roger Heavens. ISBN 978-19-00592-52-9.
- Underdown, David (2000). Start of Play. Westminster: Allen Lane. ISBN 978-07-13993-30-1 – via Internet Archive.
- Waghorn, H. T. (2005) [1906]. The Dawn of Cricket. London: J. W. McKenzie. ISBN 978-09-47821-17-3.
