= Bromley Cricket Club =

Historical English cricket team

Bromley Cricket Club is an English cricket club in the London Borough of Bromley. Historically part of Kent, the club plays in the Kent Cricket League. The club dates to the 18th century, at which time it was one of the strongest clubs in England.

== History ==
The first definite mention of the area in a cricket connection is a 1735 match on Bromley Common between Kent and London Cricket Club. The report of this match states that "a large crowd attended". During this time Bromley produced noted players like John Bowra, William Bowra, Robert Colchin, and the brothers James and John Bryant.

A match took place in June 1742 between London and Bromley at the Artillery Ground which is the second known instance of a match finishing as a tie.
