= Timothy J. McCann =

English archivist (1944–2022)

Timothy John McCann (4 June 1944 – 26 June 2022) was an English archivist.

Tim McCann joined the West Sussex Record Office in Chichester in 1967.

He wrote several books about the history of Sussex including a classic work on cricket: Sussex Cricket in the Eighteenth Century (2004). He previously wrote and edited The Correspondence of the Dukes of Richmond and Newcastle, 1724–1750 (1984), a work about Charles Lennox, 2nd Duke of Richmond, and his close friend Thomas Pelham-Holles, 1st Duke of Newcastle. McCann contributed more than twenty papers to the Sussex Archaeological Collections.

He was honoured by the Association of Cricket Statisticians and Historians as their Statistician of the Year in 2004.

McCann died on 26 June 2022 aged 78.
