= 1744 English cricket season =

Cricket season review

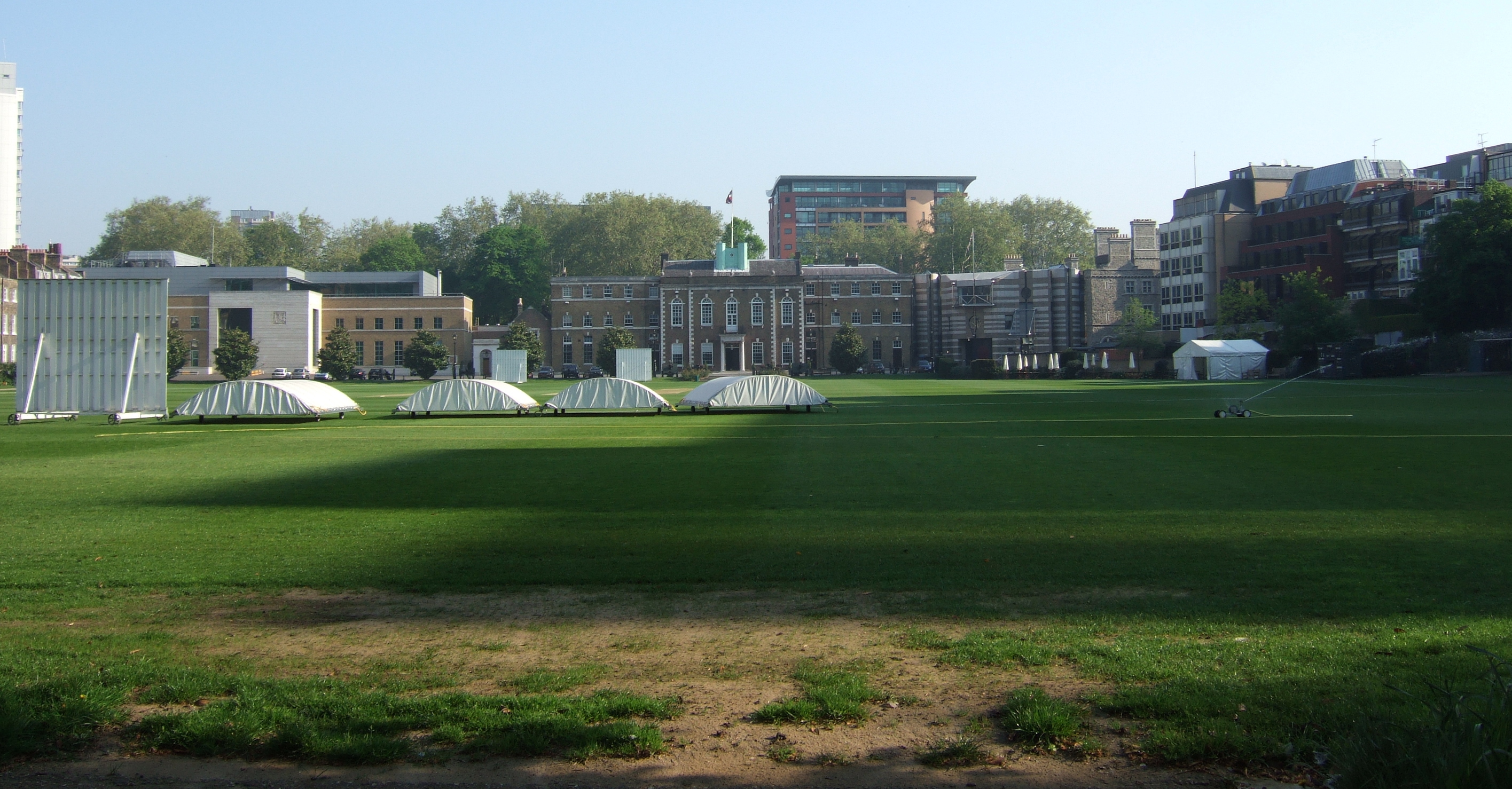
The Artillery Ground in Finsbury was the feature venue of English cricket in 1744.

The 1744 cricket season in England is remembered for the earliest known codification of the Laws of Cricket. This was drafted by members of several cricket clubs, though the code was not published until 1755. Much of its terminology such as no ball, over, toss, umpire, and wicket remain in current use.

The season is also notable for the two earliest known surviving match scorecards. The second of those matches, played on Monday, 18 June, was a celebrated event in which Kent challenged England at the Artillery Ground, Kent winning by one wicket. In total, details of 24 historically important matches are known. (Note: Any match listed in the ACS' Important Match Guide (1981) is historically important, and therefore of the highest standard, whether or not a scorecard might exist. The same applies to numerous matches discovered by researchers since 1981. For further information, see First-class cricket.)

In September, Slindon Cricket Club defeated London Cricket Club and then issued a challenge to play "any parish in England". The challenge was accepted by the Addington and Bromley clubs, but there is no record of either challenge match having been completed. The single wicket form of the sport was popular and reports have survived of four important matches played at the Artillery Ground. Several eleven-a-side matches are the subject of surviving pre-match announcements or post-match summaries. Some reports mention crowd disturbances, and efforts were made to implement control by means of admission charges, and limitations on the sale of alcohol. Wagering on cricket was common, and some matches are known to have been played for high stakes.

== The Laws of Cricket ==
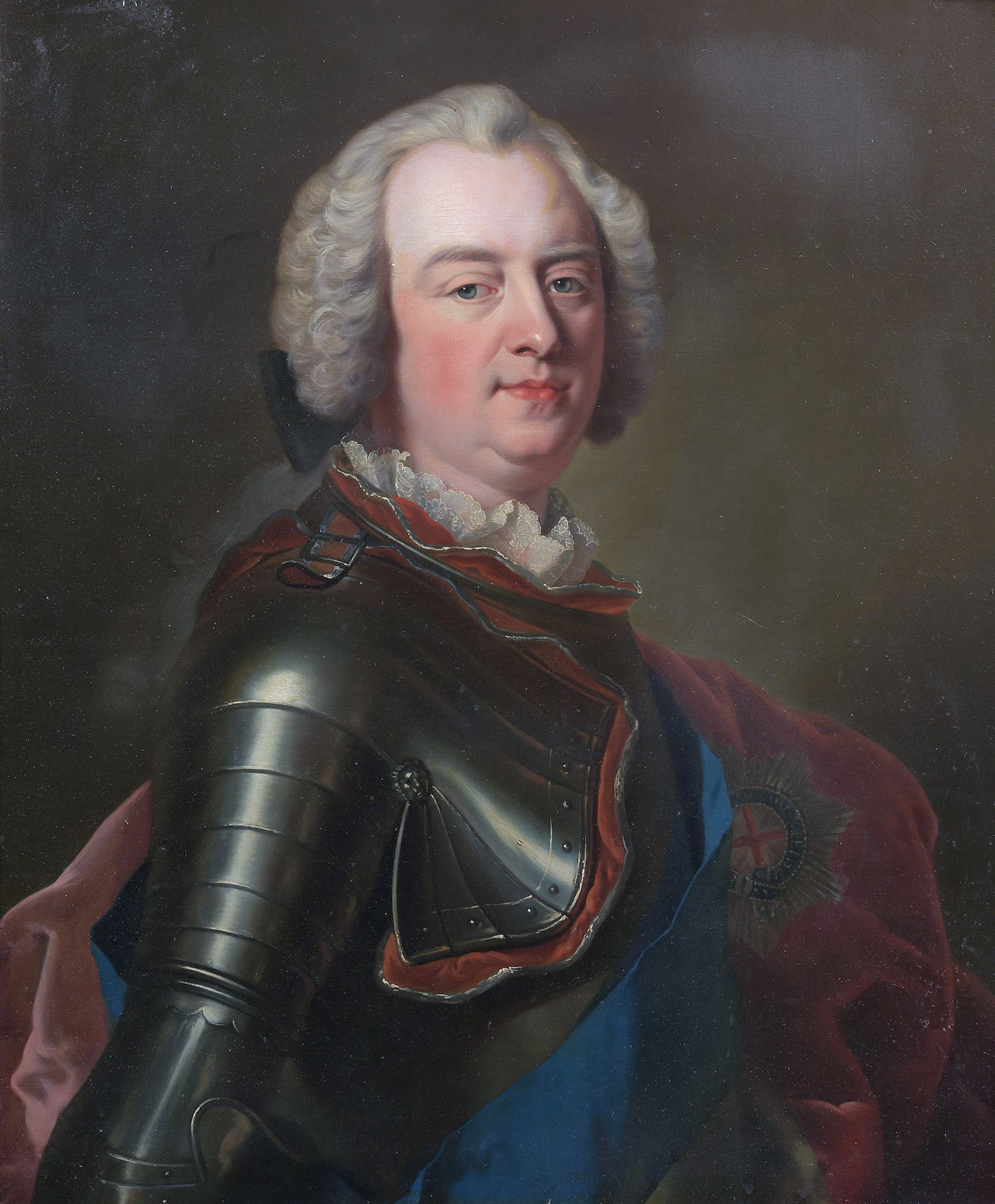
Charles Lennox, 2nd Duke of Richmond was an influential figure in early cricket.

The earliest known coded issue of the Laws of Cricket was drafted by members of several clubs, including London, of which Frederick Louis, Prince of Wales, was president. Representatives of the clubs met at the Star and Garter tavern on Pall Mall, London. The heading of the printed version, published in 1755, reads: "The Game at Cricket, As settled by the Several Cricket-Clubs, Particularly that of the Star and Garter in Pall-Mall". According to Wisden Cricketers' Almanack in 1965, these Laws were undoubtedly a recension of a much earlier code. No earlier code has been found. However, there were cases of Articles of Agreement being drawn up, as for the matches in 1727 between Charles Lennox, 2nd Duke of Richmond, and Alan Brodrick, 2nd Viscount Midleton.

Some of the main points in the 1744 code:

- the toss of a coin determines who bats first;
- the length of the pitch must be 22 yards (20 metres);
- the bowling and popping creases must be cut with the popping crease exactly 3 feet ten inches before the bowling crease;
- the stumps must be 22 inches (560 mm) high with a six-inch (152 mm) bail;
- the ball must weigh between five and six ounces (141.75 and 170.10 grams);
- overs last four balls;
- the no ball is the penalty for overstepping, which means the hind foot going in front of the bowling crease (i.e., in direct line of the wicket);
- various means of "it is out" are specified – they include hitting the ball twice and obstructing the field;
- the wicket-keeper is required to be still and quiet until the ball is bowled;
- umpires must allow two minutes for a new batsman to arrive and ten minutes between innings;
- the umpire cannot give a batsman out if the fielders do not appeal;
- the umpire is allowed a certain amount of discretion and it is made clear that the umpire is the "sole judge" and that "his determination shall be absolute".

There are four Laws for bowlers but they do not say he must roll the ball and there is no mention of prescribed arm action, only that he must "deliver the ball" with one foot behind the bowling crease. Rowland Bowen, writing in the 1965 edition of Wisden, asserts that the ball was bowled in the true sense (all along the ground) through the first half of the 18th century and that this was the rule prior to the 1750s, though it was largely forsaken by the 1770s after bowlers began pitching the ball.

== Earliest known scorecards ==
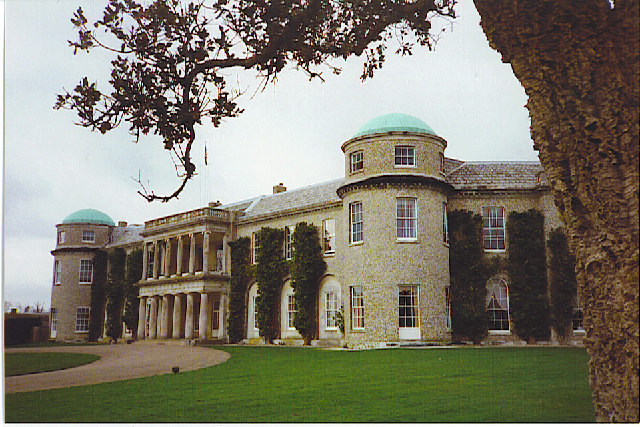
Goodwood House in Sussex, where the oldest known scorecard was kept.

The season is also notable for the two earliest known surviving match scorecards. It is not until the 1772 season that more scorecards of important matches have survived, although a handful of cards from minor matches have been found.

=== London v Surrey & Sussex, Artillery Ground, 2 June ===
The first, containing individual scores but no details of dismissals, is from a match between London and a combined Surrey & Sussex team at the Artillery Ground on 2 June. No titles were given to the teams at the time and various titles, including London v Slindon, have been applied by modern authors. London, whose team included given men, was the host club and their opponents were all from the counties of Surrey and Sussex. The scorecard was kept by the 2nd Duke of Richmond at Goodwood House.

2 June 1744

Surrey & Sussex	v	London
102; George Jackson 19 no bowling data recorded		79; Butler 18 no bowling data recorded
102/6 declared John Harris 47 no bowling data recorded		70; Stephen Dingate 19 no bowling data recorded

Surrey & Sussex won by 55 runs
Artillery Ground, Finsbury, London
Umpires: not known

- Toss not known
- Although the Laws of Cricket did not allow for declarations in 1744, it would seem that the combined XI declared their second innings closed with four wickets standing. The newspaper report says: "55 notches beat by and three men to go in".

The card gives the scores by each player and their surnames only, although it does differentiate between the two pairs of brothers (the Harrises and Newlands) who were playing. The Daily Advertiser carried the names of players expected to play in the match on 1–2 June and reported the same names on 3 June although some of them do not appear on the scorecard.

Surrey & Sussex scored 102 runs in the first of their two innings, and 102 for 6 wickets in their second. London scored 79 in their first innings and 70 in their second so that Surrey & Sussex won by 55 runs. The highest individual score in the match was 47 by John Harris of Surrey & Sussex in the second innings. This was the first game at which tickets for readmission are known to have been issued to the spectators.

=== England v Kent, Artillery Ground, 18 June ===
Just over a fortnight later, on 18 June, the scorecard has also survived from a match at the Artillery Ground between England and Kent. The match was arranged by Lord John Sackville, who captained Kent. England, batting first, totalled 40 and 70 in their two innings; Kent responded with 53 and 58 for 9 to win by one wicket. It is the first match for which a scorecard has survived that includes some dismissals, though they are only partially complete. It is known that Kent bowler William Hodsoll took at least eight wickets, while Richard Newland of England made the two highest individual scores in the match with 18 not out and 15. The match is the first entry in Arthur Haygarth's Scores & Biographies, although he gave the year as 1746 instead of 1744.

18 June 1744
Scorecard

England	v	Kent
40; Richard Newland 18; William Hodsoll 4w		53; George Kipps 12 bowling data unclear
70; Richard Newland 15; William Hodsoll 4w		58/9; Kipps 10 bowling data unclear

Kent won by 1 wicket
Artillery Ground, Finsbury, London
Umpires: not known

- Toss not known
- While it is known that Hodsoll took eight wickets in the match, 21 wickets fell (7 each) to bowlers called Harris, Mills, and Newland. But there were two Harrises, two Millses, and three Newlands playing, and the card does not differentiate them.

In England's first innings, J. Bryant—one of the brothers James or John Bryant—was stumped by George Kipps, the Kent wicket-keeper. It is the earliest known instance of that type of dismissal. Kipps, who is recorded in four historically important matches to 1747, was the sport's first noted wicket-keeper.

The match was described by the London Daily Advertiser as the "greatest cricket match ever known". It was a noted social occasion as the spectators included the Prince of Wales and his brother, Prince William, Duke of Cumberland. Also present were the 2nd Duke of Richmond and Admiral Vernon. The poet James Love (1722–1774) commemorated it in his Cricket: An Heroic Poem (1745), written in rhyming couplets. According to cricket historian H. S. Altham, it "should be in every cricket lover's library" and "his description of the game goes with a rare swing". The poem is one of the first substantial pieces of literature about cricket – in More Than A Game, former prime minister John Major says it is the earliest-known cricket poem. Love was himself a cricketer and a member of Richmond Cricket Club in Surrey.

There was crowd disorder at the match. The Daily Advertiser reported on Saturday, 30 June that it was "with difficulty the match was played out". A decision was taken to charge sixpence admission at future matches on the Artillery Ground. Also, the field would be surrounded by a ring of benches to hold over 800 people and no one without prior authorisation would be allowed within the ring.

== Slindon challenge matches ==
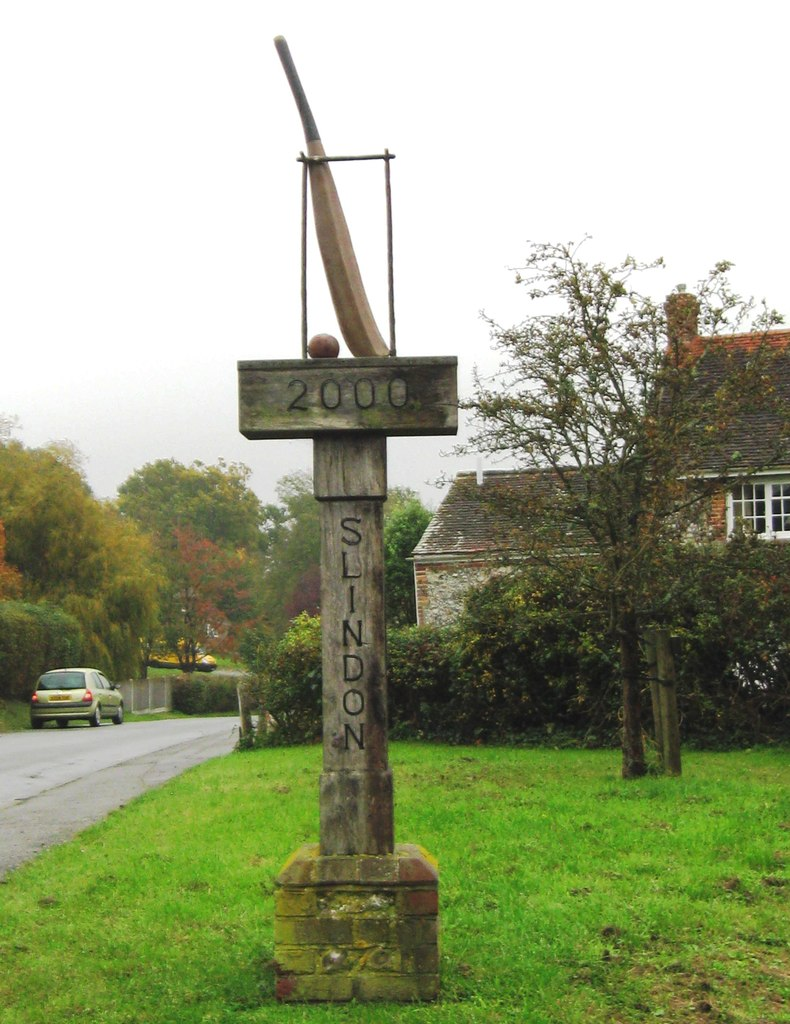
Slindon Cricket Sign

On Monday, 10 September, the London club hosted a match against Slindon at the Artillery Ground. Play continued into the Tuesday and, after winning the match by an unknown margin, Slindon issued a challenge to play "any parish in England" and received immediate acceptances from the Addington and Bromley clubs. These matches were arranged to take place at the Artillery Ground over the next few days and it is known that Slindon v Addington began on Wednesday, 12 September. It was impacted by bad weather and Slindon led by two runs at close of play. There are no surviving reports of play on the 13th. Slindon's match against Bromley was scheduled for Friday, 14 September, but there are no surviving reports of it taking place.

== Single wicket matches ==
Reports have survived of four important matches played at the Artillery Ground under single wicket rules. This form of cricket was popular through the 1740s. On Wednesday, 13 June, there was a one-a-side match between two unnamed players "for a considerable sum of money, in order to determine finally who is the best player". On Monday, 20 August, there was another one-a-side match "for a large sum" between a Sevenoaks player and a London player.

On Monday, 17 September, a three-a-side match was billed as "Long Robin's Side v Richard Newland's Side". The participants were described as "the six best players in England". The teams were Robert Colchin ("Long Robin"), Val Romney, and John Bryant against Richard Newland, Edward Aburrow Sr, and Joe Harris. Aburrow replaced John Mills, called the "famous Kent bowler", who was originally chosen. The stake was two hundred guineas. There was another "threes" match on Monday, 1 October, again "for a considerable sum" – Robert Colchin, James Bryant, and Joe Harris played against John Bryant, Val Romney and Thomas Waymark.

== Other eleven-a-side matches ==
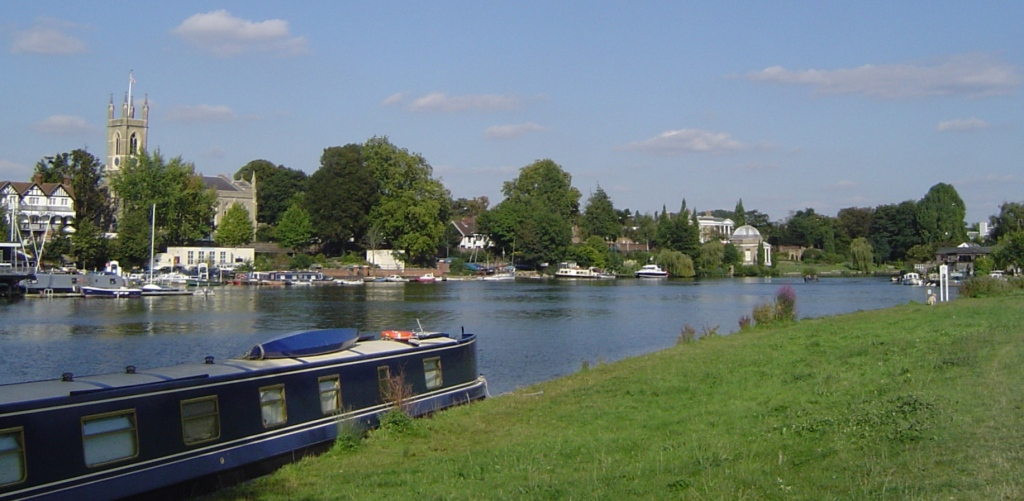
The River Thames at Moulsey Hurst, a popular sporting venue in the 18th century.

Reports have survived of three earlier matches between teams called England and Kent. Two of these took place in May at unknown venues and both were won by Kent. They later became the subject of a 1748 court case over unpaid gambling debts. The famous match on 18 June was the return to one on Friday, 15 June at Coxheath Common. Details of this match, including the result, are unknown. Kent challenged "eleven pick'd from any part of England".

Also in May, England was twice matched against Surrey. The first was played at Moulsey Hurst on Monday, 14 May, and Surrey won by four runs. The return on the 21st was played at the Artillery Ground but no details, including the result, have been found. A newspaper announcement before the second match warned spectators against encroaching onto the field of play and bringing dogs into the ground.

During the season, there were three matches which modern sources have labelled Two Elevens as each involved unnamed teams. The first of these matches took place at the Artillery Ground on Thursday, 5 July. It is known that spectators had to pay sixpence – the earliest recorded admission charge. The second match began at Moulsey Hurst on Friday, 6 July, and was unfinished. Overnight, one team led by 31 runs with two second innings wickets standing. Play continued at the Artillery Ground on the 7th with admission reduced to the "usual" twopence. Near the end of the season on Wednesday, 19 September, the Artillery Ground staged "a great match between 22 of the best players from Kent, Surrey, Sussex and London".

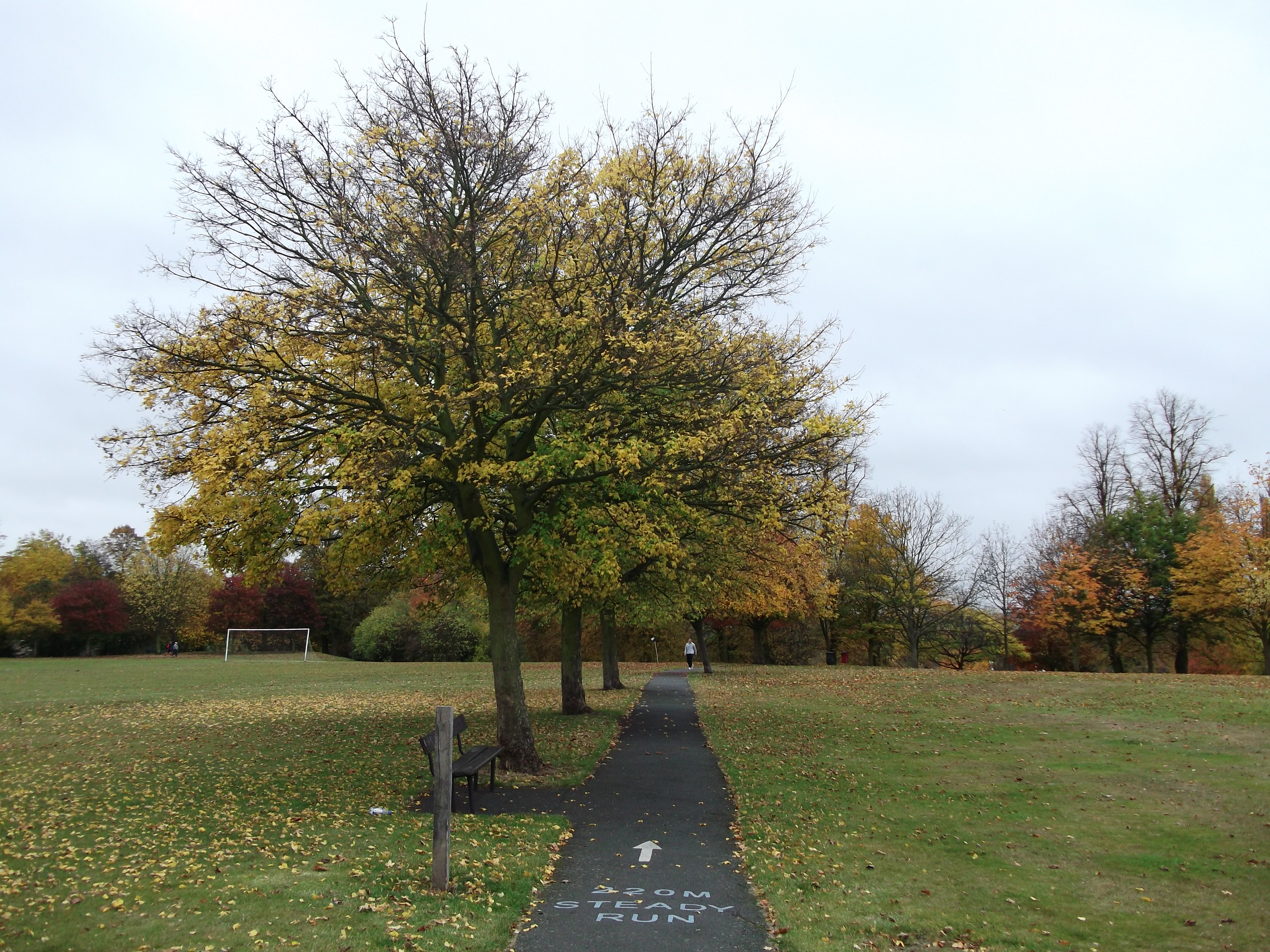
Duppas Hill Recreation Ground, near Croydon.

The prominent Addington and Bromley clubs, who accepted the Slindon challenge in September, were scheduled to play a match against each other on Friday, 13 July. No post-match reports have survived. The venue was Bromley Common where, as stated in a pre-match announcement, no person was allowed to sell liquor "but who belong to the Parish". On the previous Monday, the 9th, a combined Addington & Bromley team were due to play a team called Surrey and the Rest of Kent at Duppas Hill in Croydon. It is known that George Kipps, the noted wicket-keeper, was a given man for Addington & Bromley. A similar pre-match announcement warned that no person would be allowed to bring liquor into the ground "that don't live in the Parish". In other surviving announcements, London were to host matches at the Artillery Ground against Addington on Monday, 30 July; and against Bromley on Monday, 3 September. No post-match reports have been found.

Reports or announcements have been found of five other eleven-a-side matches which all involved London. On Monday, 9 July, they were due to play Richmond on Kennington Common but no match details have survived. London arranged a match against Woburn Cricket Club at the Artillery Ground for Thursday, 19 July, but it had to be postponed for two days because the Honourable Artillery Company required the ground. No post-match report has been found.

The other three London matches were against Surrey. They first met at Moulsey Hurst on Friday, 24 August, and London won. Robert Colchin of Bromley and Val Romney of Sevenoaks played as given men for London. The stakes for this match were reported to be "£50 a side". There was a return match the following Monday, 27th, at the Artillery Ground and London with Colchin and Romney were again the winners. A third match was scheduled at the Artillery Ground for Friday, 7 September with Romney playing for London but no post-match details are known.

== Other events ==
Monday, 11 June. The Penny London Morning Advertiser announced a match on Walworth Common in Surrey between "11 gentlemen of the Borough of Southwark and 11 gentlemen of High Kent and Blackman; the wickets to be pitched at one o'clock". The announcement continued: "The gentlemen who play this match have subscribed for a Holland smock of one guinea value, which will be run for by two jolly wenches, one known by the name of The Little Bit of Blue (the handsome Broom Girl) at the fag end of Kent Street, and the other Black Bess of the Mint. They are to run in drawers only and there is excellent sport expected". As for security: "Captain Vinegar with a great many of his bruisers and bulldogs will attend to make a ring, that no civil spectators may be incommoded by the rabble".

The Penny London Morning Advertiser on Wednesday, 27 June advertised a match to be played next day on Woolwich Common between Woolwich and "the Club in Long Lane, Southwark".

== First mentions ==
Thanks to the survival of scorecards from two matches in 1744, the names of a great many players from the season are known. The players listed below are named on the two scorecards but the spans of their careers is generally unknown. It is believed that Dingate, for example, was active in the 1720s while others may have continued into the 1760s.

=== Clubs and teams ===
- Addington & Bromley (combined)
- Kent & Surrey (combined)
- Long Robin's XI aka Long Robin's Side
- Richard Newland's XI aka Richard Newland's Side
- Surrey & Sussex (combined)

=== Players ===
name	club/county	notes
Adam Newland	Slindon	Brother of Richard Newland. Noted member of the Slindon team.
Little Bennett	London	Probably brothers and noted in contemporary reports to have been two of the best batsmen of their time.
Tall Bennett	London	Probably brothers and noted in contemporary reports to have been two of the best batsmen of their time.
Collins	Surrey	Mentioned in 1744 and 1748; played for London against Surrey & Sussex in the earliest match that has a surviving scorecard.
Edward Aburrow Sr	Slindon and Sussex	Also known as "Cuddy", he was a notorious smuggler who played under his alias to disguise himself. Father of the Hambledon player of the same name, he is recorded in matches to 1751. A noted single wicket player.
George Jackson	Addington and Surrey	Known to have been a good batsman who frequently played in single wicket contests, he is recorded in matches to 1752.
Green	Amberley and Sussex	Recorded in three matches to 1747.
Howlett	London	Made two known appearances in 1744 and 1745.
James Bryant	Bromley and Kent	Brother of John Bryant. One of the best players for Kent and a key member of Bromley Cricket Club.
James Love	Richmond	A playing member at Richmond but better known as a poet.
Joe Harris	Addington and Surrey	Brother of John Harris and recorded until 1756. Made 26 known appearances in single wicket and 15 in matches.
John Harris	Addington and Surrey	Brother of Joe Harris and recorded until 1754. Made 11 known appearances in single wicket and 12 in matches.
John Mills	Horsmonden and Kent	A noted bowler who played for Kent against England.
George Kipps	Sevenoaks and Kent	A noted wicket-keeper who is recorded four times to 1747.
Maynard	Surrey	Recorded in 12 matches to 1750.
Norris	London	Made two known appearances in 1744 and 1745.
Stephen Dingate	Surrey and Sussex	Came from Reigate, and believed to have been a barber by trade. One of the leading single wicket players of the 1740s.
Stevens	Surrey	Two players called Stevens were due to play in the London v Surrey & Sussex match on 2 June 1744, but did not take part. They are not mentioned in other sources. They have no known connection with Lumpy Stevens.
Tom Faulkner	Addington and Surrey	A prominent single wicket player who is recorded to 1761. Was also a prizefighter who fought under the sobriquet of "Long Tom".
Andrews	Slindon and Sussex	All played in the London v Surrey & Sussex match.
Butler	London	All played in the London v Surrey & Sussex match.
Hodder	London	All played in the London v Surrey & Sussex match.
Bartram	Kent	All three played for Kent against England. Mills is believed to have been the brother of John Mills.
Danes	Kent	All three played for Kent against England. Mills is believed to have been the brother of John Mills.
Mills	Kent	All three played for Kent against England. Mills is believed to have been the brother of John Mills.

== Bibliography ==
- ACS (1981). A Guide to Important Cricket Matches Played in the British Isles 1709–1863. Nottingham: ACS. OCLC 85045528.
- Altham, H. S.; Swanton, E. W. (1962). A History of Cricket, Volume 1 (to 1914) (5th ed.). London: George Allen & Unwin. OCLC 894274808.
- Bowen, Rowland (1970). Cricket: A History of its Growth and Development. London: Eyre & Spottiswoode. ISBN 978-04-13278-60-9.
- Buckley, G. B. (1935). Fresh Light on 18th Century Cricket. Birmingham: Cotterell & Co. OCLC 23450280.
- Haygarth, Arthur (1996) [1862]. Scores & Biographies, Volume 1 (1744–1826). Kennington: Frederick Lillywhite. ISBN 978-19-00592-23-9.
- Major, John (2007). More Than A Game. London: HarperCollins. ISBN 978-00-07183-64-7 – via Internet Archive.
- Maun, Ian (2009). From Commons to Lord's, Volume One: 1700 to 1750. Cambridge: Roger Heavens. ISBN 978-19-00592-52-9.
- Maun, Ian (2011). From Commons to Lord's, Volume Two: 1751 to 1770. Leicester: Martin Wilson. ISBN 978-09-56906-60-1.
- McCann, Tim (2004). Sussex Cricket in the Eighteenth Century (PDF). Vol. 88. Lewes: West Sussex Record Office. ISBN 978-08-54450-55-8.
- Waghorn, H. T. (1899). Cricket Scores, Notes, &c. From 1730–1773. Edinburgh: Blackwood. OCLC 1086375331.
- Waghorn, H. T. (2005) [1906]. The Dawn of Cricket. London: J. W. McKenzie. ISBN 978-09-47821-17-3.
