= John Bryant (cricketer) =

English cricketer (c.1720–1772)

Personal information
- Full name: John Bryant
- Born: c.1720
- Died: 1772

Domestic team information
- Years: Team
- c.1743 – ?: Bromley Cricket Club
- c.1743 – ?: Kent
- c.1743 – ?: England

John Bryant (c.1720 – 1772) was an English cricketer of the mid-Georgian period who played for Bromley and Kent. He also represented various England teams. A top-class player, he made numerous appearances in historically important matches, both eleven-a-side and single wicket. He was the brother of James Bryant, also of Bromley, where they were team-mates of Robert Colchin. In 1744, John Bryant and Colchin were named as two of the best players in England. (Note: Matches at this time were played on rudimentary pitches with a two-stump wicket. The batter used a curved bat and the bowler delivered the ball with an underarm action by bowling it all along the ground. The sport underwent an evolutionary change in the 1760s when bowlers began pitching the ball, still using an underarm action, and the modern straight bat was introduced in response.) (Note: Scorecard data till at least 1825 was never comprehensive, especially the dismissal information: bowling analyses lacked balls bowled and runs conceded; bowlers were not credited with wickets when the batsman was caught or stumped; in many matches, the means of dismissal were omitted.)

Bryant has never been recognised as a bowler, so it must be assumed he was a specialist batsman. It is not known if he was right- or left-handed. If he did bowl, he used an underarm action. The actual length of Bryant's career is uncertain, but there were 36 important matches between 1743 and 1756 in which he definitely appeared: 17 eleven-a-side, and 19 under single wicket rules.

== Career ==
=== 1743—earliest reference ===
Three of Kent v Three of England was a three-a-side single wicket game, played 11 July 1743 on the Artillery Ground. The six players involved, including Bryant, were publicised as "the best in England". There is no record of Bryant before 1743, but it is extremely unlikely that a new and inexperienced player would be rated as one of "the best". The teams were William Hodsoll (Dartford), John Cutbush (Maidstone), and Val Romney (Sevenoaks) playing as Three of Kent; and Richard Newland (Slindon), William Sawyer (Richmond), and Bryant (Bromley) playing as Three of England. Hodsoll and Newland were the captains.

The Daily Advertiser of Thursday, 7 July 1743 said Thomas Ridgeway of Sussex was to play alongside Hodsoll and Romney. Then, on Friday, 8 July, Cutbush, known to have been a clockmaker from Maidstone, was named instead of Ridgeway. Kent won by 2 runs, but individual performances are not on record. The London Evening Post estimated a crowd of over 10,000. A return match was arranged at Sevenoaks Vine on Wednesday, 27 July, but it did not come off.

=== 1744 season ===
In June 1744, 'J. Bryant' (first name not recorded) played for Surrey & Sussex against London at the Artillery Ground, the match which left the world's earliest-known scorecard. He scored 5 and 10 to help his team win by 55 runs. Two weeks later, 'J. Bryant' scored 12 and 7 for England against Kent, also at the Artillery Ground; Kent won by one wicket.

On Monday, 17 September 1744, a three-a-side single wicket match was billed as "Long Robin's Side v Richard Newland's Side". The participants were described as "the six best players in England". The teams were Robert Colchin ("Long Robin"), Val Romney, and Bryant against Richard Newland, Edward Aburrow Sr, and Joe Harris. Aburrow replaced John Mills, called the "famous Kent bowler", who was originally chosen. The stake was two hundred guineas. There was another "threes" match at the Artillery Ground on Monday, 1 October—again "for a considerable sum"—when Colchin, James Bryant, and Joe Harris played against John Bryant, Romney, and Thomas Waymark. This is the first definite mention of James Bryant in surviving records.

=== 1744—earliest-known stumping ===
The earliest-known instance of a batsman being stumped was in the England v Kent match, when 'J. Bryant' of England was dismissed by George Kipps, the noted Kent wicket-keeper. The surviving match scorecard is the first to include dismissal information.

=== 1745 season ===
A single wicket game between two "threes" was played Monday, 24 June 1745 on the Artillery Ground. The teams were William Hodsoll's Side, which was William Hodsoll (Dartford), Val Romney (Sevenoaks), and Richard Newland (Slindon) versus Long Robin's Side, consisting of Robert Colchin, John Bryant (both of Bromley), and 'J. Harris' (Addington). It is not known which of John or Joe Harris was playing. Hodsoll's Side won by 7 runs.

Two of the biggest matches of the 1745 season were played 26 June and 5 July on the Artillery Ground. The first was publicised as Long Robin's XI v Richard Newland's XI. Robert Colchin was nicknamed "Long Robin" because of his height. The teams for the first match were named, some of the players for the first time. No details of the scores were reported, but the result was a victory for Long Robin's XI by "over 70 runs". The match was "arranged by the noblemen and gentlemen of the London Club".

- Long Robin's XI were Robert Colchin (captain), Tom Faulkner, James Bryant, Joe Harris, Broad, Hodge, Val Romney, George Jackson, Robert Lascoe, John Harris, and John Bowra.
- Newland's XI were Richard Newland (captain), John Bryant, Norton, Jacob Mann, Little and Tall Bennett, Martin, Howlett, William Anderson, Norris, and Howard.

The fixture was repeated on 5 July, but the players were not named. It was between the same teams but it was publicised differently as "Sevenoaks, Bromley & Addington versus Slindon, Horsmonden, Chislehurst & London". As before, the match was "arranged by the noblemen and gentlemen of the London Club". No details of the play are known, but the result was another win for Long Robin's XI, this time by 5 wickets.

Also in 1745, a combined Addington & Lingfield team were due to play twice against Surrey on 22 July and 16 September, both matches on the Artillery Ground. John Bryant and Little Bennett were to be given men for Surrey. Other matches with no reports were Croydon v Lambeth, 23 July on Kennington Common; Kingston v Lambeth, next day, also on the Common; Addington v Lingfield, 3 August at Addington Hills; and London v Kingston, 7 August on the Artillery Ground.

=== 1746 season ===
On 23 June 1746, Kent and Surrey were scheduled to play on the Artillery Ground. Kent's team consisted entirely of players from Bromley, Bexley, and Sevenoaks; these included Bryant, Robert Colchin, George Kipps, John Bowra, James Bryant, and Robert Eures.

On 6 August 1746, there was a three-a-side game between Long Robin's Side and Stephen Dingate's Side in the Artillery Ground involving "six players esteemed the best in England". The teams were Robert Colchin, Bryant (both Bromley), and Joe Harris (Addington) versus Stephen Dingate (Surrey), Val Romney (Sevenoaks), and Richard Newland (Slindon). Dingate's team won the match. Hundreds of pounds were lost and won over the game. Newspapers pre-announcing the event named John Harris in Long Robin's team, but it was his brother Joe who actually played.

=== 1747 season ===
Two games between Kent and England were due to be played at Bromley Common on Monday, 29 June, and at the Artillery Ground on Wednesday, 1 July, but both matches were "deferred on account of the gentlemen subscribers being engaged at several Elections". The parliamentary election of 1747 resulted in a Whig government under Henry Pelham (1694–1754). In those days, voting was limited to male landed gentry.

The match on the Artillery Ground was re-arranged for 31 August, and the Bromley Common one for 2 September. Most of the players were from one of eight clubs: Addington, Bexley, Bromley, Dartford, Hadlow, London, Sevenoaks, and Slindon. The Daily Advertiser announced the teams on 31 August:

- England—Richard Newland (Slindon), Green (Amberley, Sussex), Stephen Dingate, Little Bennett, Thomas Jure (all London), Tom Faulkner, Joe Harris, Broad, George Jackson (all Addington), William Sawyer (Richmond), and Maynard (Surrey).
- Kent—Robert Colchin, James and John Bryant (all Bromley), Val Romney, George Kipps, John Mansfield (all Sevenoaks), John Bell, Thomas Bell (both Dartford), Jones, John Larkin (both Hadlow), and Robert Eures (Bexley).

The source also carried a statement by George Smith, the Artillery Ground keeper: "The Town may be certain that the taking Six-pence Admittance is out of no avaricious Temper. Two-pence being greatly insufficient to the Charge that attends the Matches, which Mr Smith is ready and willing to make appear to any Gentleman".

Both matches are "result unknown".

If it was played, one of the biggest matches of the 1747 season might have been Long Robin's Nine v William Hodsoll's Ten on the Artillery Ground. Planned for 9 July, it was a "scratch match" arranged by members of the London club. The players were mostly from London, Bromley, Dartford, Hadlow, and Slindon. Long Robin's Nine were Robert Colchin, all three—Adam, John, and Richard—Newland brothers, both—James and John—the Bryant brothers, Little Bennett, John Bowra, and Thomas Jure. Hodsoll's Ten were William Hodsoll, Allen, John Bell, Thomas Bell, Broad, Tom Faulkner, one—either Joe or John—of the Harris brothers, and three players from Hadlow who were John Larkin, Jones, and one unnamed team-mate.

In early August 1747, there were two single wicket matches at the Artillery Ground which were organised by the 2nd Duke of Richmond. In the first, three of his employees Stephen Dingate, Joseph Rudd, and Pye defeated Little and Tall Bennett, and William Anderson. In the second, the same threes were to play again but in a "fives" match with the two—James and John—Bryant brothers added to the Duke's team, and with Tom Faulkner and one—either Joe or John—of the Harris brothers to their opponents. The result of the second game is unknown.

=== Later seasons ===
Bryant is recorded from 1748 to 1752. The final references to him are in September 1756 when he played, as a given man, in two matches for London against Dartford.

== See also ==
All need to be checked for further information:

- 1743 English cricket season
- 1744 English cricket season
- 1745 English cricket season
- 1746 English cricket season
- 1747 English cricket season
- 1748 English cricket season
- 1749 English cricket season
- 1750 English cricket season
- 1752 English cricket season
- 1756 English cricket season

== Bibliography ==
- ACS (1981). A Guide to Important Cricket Matches Played in the British Isles 1709–1863. Nottingham: ACS. OCLC 85045528.
- Buckley, G. B. (1935). Fresh Light on 18th Century Cricket. Birmingham: Cotterell & Co. OCLC 23450280.
- Haygarth, Arthur (1997) [1862]. Scores & Biographies, Volume 2 (1827–1840). Kennington: Frederick Lillywhite. ISBN 978-19-00592-23-9.
- Light, Rob (2011). "Cricket in the eighteenth century". In Bateman, Anthony; Hill, Jeffrey (eds.). The Cambridge Companion to Cricket (PDF). Cambridge University Press. pp. 26–39.
- Maun, Ian (2009). From Commons to Lord's, Volume One: 1700 to 1750. Cambridge: Roger Heavens. ISBN 978-19-00592-52-9.
- McCann, Tim (2004). Sussex Cricket in the Eighteenth Century (PDF). Vol. 88. Lewes: West Sussex Record Office. ISBN 978-08-54450-55-8.
- Waghorn, H. T. (1899). Cricket Scores, Notes, &c. From 1730–1773. Edinburgh: Blackwood. OCLC 1086375331.
- Waghorn, H. T. (2005) [1906]. The Dawn of Cricket. London: J. W. McKenzie. ISBN 978-09-47821-17-3.
- Webber, Roy (1951). The Playfair Book of Cricket Records. London: Playfair Books Ltd. OCLC 753176177.
- Wilson, Martin (2005). An Index to Waghorn. London: Bodyline Books (limited edition, by subscription only). [ISBN unspecified]
