= 1751 English cricket season =

Cricket season review

In the 1751 English cricket season, the earliest known references to the sport are found in each of Durham, Somerset, Warwickshire, and Yorkshire. The season's two biggest matches were between England and Kent, both on the Artillery Ground in May. Details of 17 historically important matches are known. (Note: Any match listed in the ACS' Important Match Guide (1981) is historically important, and therefore of the highest standard, whether or not a scorecard might exist. The same applies to numerous matches discovered by researchers since 1981. For further information, see First-class cricket.)

== England v Kent ==
England played Kent in two matches across 20–22 May, both on the Artillery Ground. The first match was played over two days, the 21st and 22nd. Play on the 21st started at one o'clock, and on the second day at ten o'clock. England scored 26 and 122; Kent replied with 76 and 63. At the end of the first day, Kent in their second innings were 23/2, still needing 73 to win. Kent were reduced to 43/9 before the last pair came together, so the final wicket added 20. England won by 9 9 runs. The teams were:

- England—Stephens, Richard Newland, Edward Aburrow Sr, John Harris, Joe Harris, John Frame, Mathews, Perry, Stephen Harding, Stephen Dingate, and "A. N. Other".
- Kent—William Hodsoll, Tom Faulkner, Stone, Wilden, Garrett, Rawlings, John Bell, Thomas Bell, Howard, James Bryant, and Val Romney.

Kent had Tom Faulkner (Addington and Surrey) as a given man. "A. N. Other" played for the Thursley club, as did Stephen Harding (later of Chertsey), who was a noted bowler. In England's second innings, these two went in first and scored 51 for the first wicket. Harding apparently made 50 of these himself, and had one hit out of the ground against a house on Bunhill Row opposite. He was given four runs for that effort. You could only score six if you were actually able to run that many, and to do that you would need the help of overthrows.

For the first time ever, the fall of wickets in an innings is known. This is England's second innings: 1/51, 2/72, 3/77, 4/77, 5/78, 6/84, 7/87, 8/119, 9/119, 10/122.

The second match was completed in a single day, the 22nd, and England won by an innings and 9 runs. Kent scored 88 and 67; England scored 164. The teams were the same as on the two previous days, and the name of the second Thursley player is again unrecorded.

== Single wicket matches ==
Only four single wicket matches are in this season's sources, two in June and two on the same day in August.

In June, there were two "fives" match on the Artillery Ground between Kent and Surrey. The first was played Monday, 3 June, and the return on Wednesday, 5 June. Both were won by Kent, although the betting was in favour of Surrey. The margin of victory on 3 June is unknown. On 5 June, Kent won by 14 runs after scoring 4 and 57 (a huge improvement in the second innings), and Surrey replied with 26 and 21.

Kent's players in the two matches were Tom Faulkner (given man), John Bell, Thomas Bell, Stone, and Val Romney. Surrey's players were Stephen Dingate, John Harris, Joe Harris, Stephen Harding, and Perry.

On Monday, 26 August, there were two matches on the Artillery Ground between Five of London and Five "Country" Players. Neither result is known.

== Other eleven-a-side matches ==
Another seven matches were recorded, but only one has a known result.

Surrey v London was arranged Monday, 13 May on the Artillery Ground. The actual title of the match, as advertised beforehand, was "Addington, Warlingham, Croydon & Cheam versus Ripley, Thursley & London". It was arranged "by the noblemen and gentlemen of the London Club". No details were reported afterwards.

On Saturday, 1 June, Addington met Hadlow on Hayes Common, Bromley. This was pre-announced in the Daily Advertiser on Thursday, 30 May. The result is unknown.

The Daily Advertiser announced on Monday, 24 June that Surrey would play Middlesex that day on Kennington Common, with a one o'clock start. The result is unknown.

There were two matches between Dartford and Bromley. The first was played Tuesday, 23 July on Dartford Brent, the second Thursday, 1 August on Bromley Common. Neither result is known. The first match was played for 100 guineas. Apparently, there was a challenge from players in Newmarket to take on 22 of the players in this game for any sum, but nothing further is known about it.

On Monday, 19 August, London played a team called A Country XI on the Artillery Ground. London scored 30 and 5; the Country XI replied with 24 and 6. London won by 5 runs.

The last of these matches was on Wednesday, 4 September, when Richmond met Hampton & Kingston on Moulsey Hurst. This was pre-announced in the Daily Advertiser on Monday, 2 September as "for two guineas a man; 11 a side, and to play home & home". The result is unknown.

== Other events ==
Having lost Robert Colchin and the 2nd Duke of Richmond in 1750, cricket was hit by the death of another significant patron Frederick, Prince of Wales, on Sunday, 31 March. The loss of these patrons had an adverse impact on the game's finances and the number of important matches reduced for some years to come, although economic difficulties arising from the wars of the period certainly inhibited many potential investors. It was said that the Prince of Wales died as a result of being struck on the head by a cricket ball. He may well have been hit on the head but that did not kill him; the cause of death was a burst abscess in a lung. The early death of Prince Frederick meant that his son Prince George became heir to the throne and he succeeded in 1760 as George III.

The earliest reference to cricket in Durham is a game at Raby Castle on or soon after Monday, 5 August between the 1st Earl of Northumberland's XI and the 3rd Duke of Cleveland's XI. The game was commemorated by a ballad which starts:

Durham City has been dull so long,
No bustle at all to show;
But now the rage of all the throng
Is at cricketing to go.

The earliest reference to cricket in Somerset is a match at Saltford Meadow, near Bath, on Saturday, 13 July that was played in memory of the late Prince of Wales.

A match announcement in Aris' Gazette on Monday, 15 July is the earliest known reference to cricket in Warwickshire.

The earliest known references to cricket in Yorkshire were re local matches in Sheffield and a game on or soon after Monday, 5 August at Stanwick St John, near Richmond, North Yorkshire, between the 3rd Duke of Cleveland's XI and the 1st Earl of Northumberland's XI (the same teams that played in Durham, as noted above).

Four matches were played at Newmarket Heath and Woburn Abbey between the Gentlemen of England and an Eton College "Past & Present" team. The four games were played during June and July. The second game has a surviving scorecard but the teams in all four matches are decidedly minor.

== F. S. Ashley-Cooper ==
In 1900, Cricket: A Weekly Record of the Game presented a series of 18th century cricket notices, collated by F. S. Ashley-Cooper, as part of his regular At the Sign of the Wicket feature. The series ran through six issues (nos 530–535) from 25 January to 26 April 1900. It began with the tied match, between London and Bromley, which took place 14 June 1742 on the Artillery Ground. The final matches (two for one) in the series were the single wicket games between Five of London and Five "Country" Players at the Artillery Ground on 26 August 1751 (see above).

To conclude the series, Ashley-Cooper added brief profiles of many 1840s players, including such luminaries as Long Robin and Richard Newland.

== First mentions ==
=== Counties ===
- Durham
- Somerset
- Warwickshire
- Yorkshire

=== Clubs and teams ===
- 1st Earl of Northumberland's XI
- 3rd Duke of Cleveland's XI
- Country XI
- Gentlemen of England
- Hampton & Kingston
- Thursley

=== Players ===
- Stephen Harding (Thursley/Chertsey)
- Mathews (England)
- Stephens (Dartford)
- Stone (Kent)
- Wilden (Kent)

=== Venues ===
- Hayes Common, Bromley
- Raby Castle, County Durham
- Somerset (unspecified)
- Stanwick, Richmond
- Warwickshire (unspecified)

== Bibliography ==
- ACS (1981). A Guide to Important Cricket Matches Played in the British Isles 1709–1863. Nottingham: ACS. OCLC 85045528.
- Buckley, G. B. (1935). Fresh Light on 18th Century Cricket. Birmingham: Cotterell & Co. OCLC 23450280.
- Buckley, G. B. (1937). Fresh Light on pre-Victorian Cricket. Birmingham: Cotterell & Co. OCLC 23469107.
- Maun, Ian (2009). From Commons to Lord's, Volume One: 1700 to 1750. Cambridge: Roger Heavens. ISBN 978-19-00592-52-9.
