= 1749 English cricket season =

Cricket season review

Single wicket remained popular in the 1749 English cricket season, and Robert Colchin was a prominent figure in the organisation of lucrative matches. (Note: Any match listed in the ACS' Important Match Guide (1981) is historically important, and therefore of the highest standard, whether or not a scorecard might exist. The same applies to numerous matches discovered by researchers since 1981. For further information, see First-class cricket.)

== Single wicket matches ==
Five single wicket matches are known to have been arranged in 1749: three in July, and two in August. They were all played on the Artillery Ground.

=== July ===
On Monday, 10 July, Five of England defeated Five of Addington. The match was played for fifty guineas a side, and was the result of a challenge by the Addington players to meet any other five in England. Betting was 8–1 in favour of Addington.

Addington: Tom Faulkner, Joe Harris, John Harris, George Jackson, and William Durling.
England: Robert Colchin, John Bryant, Robert Eures, John Bell, and Thomas Waymark.

A return match was played Monday, 17 July, both teams the same, and Addington won. The prize was again fifty guineas. A decider was played Wednesday, 26 July, which England won by 2 runs. They scored 11 and 12; Addington replied with 16 and 5. The prize this time was 100 guineas. England had made two changes to their team with James Bryant and Val Romney replacing Bell and Waymark. Addington's five were unchanged.

=== August ===
On Friday, 18 August, Tom Faulkner's Six defeated Long Robin's Six. It was played for fifty guineas a side.

Faulkner's Six: Tom Faulkner, Thomas Southam, Joseph Hitches, George Carter, and "two gentlemen".
Long Robin's Six: Robert Colchin, George Smith, William Anderson, Robinson, and "two gentlemen".

In a return match on Monday, 21 August, Tom Faulkner's Six again defeated Long Robin's Six. The teams were the same as for the match above; the stake was unrecorded.

== England v Surrey ==
In eleven-a-side cricket, the two biggest matches of the season were between England and Surrey. The first was played 2–3 June on Dartford Brent, and Surrey won by 2 wickets. England scored 89 and 42; Surrey replied with 73 and 59–8. No individual performances are known. England had William Durling of Addington, which is in Surrey, as a given man; Surrey had John and James Bryant as given men. The Bryants were natives of Bromley in Kent. John Frame, who played for Surrey, was later associated with Dartford, but he was actually born in Surrey, at Warlingham in 1733.

The second match was played 5 June on the Artillery Ground, and ended in a draw. England scored 71 and 47. Surrey scored 89 in their first innings, but bad light prevented them chasing their target of 30. Presumably, the match had to be finished (or left unfinished) on the one day. No individual performances are known. The two teams were unchanged from the match on 2 and 3 June.

== Matches with no known results ==
On 26 May, a combined Bromley & Chislehurst team were to play Addington. The venue was the "White Hart Field" on Bromley Common. Three days later, Addington were to meet a combined Bromley & London team on the Artillery Ground. London were to play Richmond & Ripley, 21 June on the Artillery Ground.

Members of London Cricket Club arranged two select XI matches on the Artillery Ground, the first on 26 June was between Long Robin's XI and Stephen Dingate's XI for one hundred guineas a side, the second on 28 August between Long Robin's XI and Tom Faulkner's XI for sixty guineas a side.

=== 26 June teams ===
William Hodsoll was due to play for one team or the other, but had to withdraw.

Long Robin's XI: Robert Colchin, John Bryant, James Bryant, John Bell, John Mansfield, Robert Eures, Val Romney, William Durling, John Colchin, John Bowra, and John Larkin.

Stephen Dingate's XI: Stephen Dingate, Tom Faulkner, Joe Harris, John Harris, George Jackson, John Frame, Humphreys, Little Bennett, Tom Peake, John Capon, and Thomas Jure.

=== 28 August teams ===
Long Robin's XI: Robert Colchin, John Bryant, James Bryant, John Colchin, Joseph Hitches, George Carter, Thomas Southam, Tall Bennett, and "three gentlemen".

Tom Faulkner's XI: Tom Faulkner, John Mansfield, Robert Eures, William Anderson, John Capon, Perry, Little Bennett, Robinson, and "three gentlemen".

== Other events ==
A match in Sussex on Monday, 5 June between teams from Hastings and Pevensey was apparently played for a hundred guineas.

Middlesex played Hertfordshire 19 July on Barnet Common. It was to be played for 50 guineas a side, but the result is unknown. The source says: "Bye balls and overthrows allowed".

A game at White Conduit Fields on Wednesday, 2 August involving 22 "gentlemen of the City of London". The report states that the venue was in use before 1720 (the White Conduit Club was not established until c.1780). On the site was the White Conduit Tavern, erected in about 1648, and this was a "favourite halting-place for those who had walked out a short distance from London". In 1749, the Tavern was owned by William Curnock and shortly afterwards by Robert Bartholomew, the Surrey cricketer.

London played Bearsted Cricket Club on 14 August and "won with great ease" on the Artillery Ground. It was stated that Bearsted was the best team in Kent, having beaten all other parishes in their neighbourhood.

On Tuesday, 29 August, Portsmouth played Fareham & Titchfield on Portsmouth Common. The Portsmouth team, which was described as "those living on the Common", won by "great odds".

== First mentions ==
=== Clubs and teams ===
- Bearsted
- Bromley & London
- Richmond & Ripley

=== Players ===
- John Frame (Surrey/Dartford/Kent)
- Joseph Hitches (Long Robin's XI)
- Humphreys (Surrey)
- Perry (London/Surrey)
- Robinson (Tom Faulkner's XI)
- Thomas Southam (Long Robin's XI)

=== Venues ===
- Barnet Common

== Bibliography ==
- ACS (1981). A Guide to Important Cricket Matches Played in the British Isles 1709–1863. Nottingham: ACS. OCLC 85045528.
- Buckley, G. B. (1935). Fresh Light on 18th Century Cricket. Birmingham: Cotterell & Co. OCLC 23450280.
- Maun, Ian (2009). From Commons to Lord's, Volume One: 1700 to 1750. Cambridge: Roger Heavens. ISBN 978-19-00592-52-9.
- McCann, Tim (2004). Sussex Cricket in the Eighteenth Century (PDF). Vol. 88. Lewes: West Sussex Record Office. ISBN 978-08-54450-55-8.
