= 1745 English cricket season =

Cricket season review

The 1745 English cricket season was held against the background of the Jacobite Rebellion, which began in August. It had little if any impact on cricket in south-east England, and the season was nearly over when the Battle of Prestonpans took place on 21 September. In July, Richard Newland scored a record 88 runs for England against Kent on the Artillery Ground. Details of 23 historically important matches are known. (Note: Any match listed in the ACS' Important Match Guide (1981) is historically important, and therefore of the highest standard, whether or not a scorecard might exist. The same applies to numerous matches discovered by researchers since 1981. For further information, see First-class cricket.)

== Highest individual innings ==
In July 1745, Richard Newland scored what was then, given prevailing pitch conditions, a massive 88 for England against Kent at the Artillery Ground. It is not absolutely certain that he did this in one innings (a parallel with John Small in 1768), given a very slight possibility that it may have been his match total but, giving him the benefit of the doubt, it is the highest individual innings recorded during the sport's pioneering period to 1763. The previous highest was 47 by John Harris in 1744. Newland's effort helped England to win the match by 119 runs.

== Kent v England ==
Newland's match was the second, and possibly third, between Kent and England in 1745. On 12 July, the teams met on Bromley Common, playing for a stake of 100 guineas, and Kent won by unknown margin. England's 119-run victory was played on 15 & 16 July. In between these two matches, on the 13th, there was a match on the Artillery Ground which was pre-announced as 'a trial match, those cricketers participating who were down to play in the Kent v All England match on the following Monday (the 15th)'. The result is unknown.

== London v Addington ==
London played Addington three times in May, the venues being Kennington Common, Addington Hills, and the Artillery Ground respectively. The result of the first match is unknown. Addington won the second, and London won the third, in both cases by an unknown margin. A further match between the two teams was scheduled for 12 August on the Artillery Ground, but there was no post-match report.

== London v Bromley ==
London also played three matches against Bromley. These were between 24 May and 17 June. The first, which was won by Bromley, was 'behind the Bell Inn' on Bromley Common. London won the second match, played 10 June on the Artillery Ground, by 10 runs. This match had been scheduled for 3 June, but it was rained off and postponed till the 10th. The match on 17 June was probably arranged as a 'decider'. It was played on the Artillery Ground for 200 guineas. The report said Bromley scored 65 and 29. London scored 48 and then 'got the match and had only three hands out', so they won by 7 wickets.

== Single wicket ==
A game between two 'threes' was played Monday, 24 June in the Artillery Ground. The teams were William Hodsoll's Side, which was William Hodsoll (Dartford), Val Romney (Sevenoaks), and Richard Newland (Slindon) versus Long Robin's Side, consisting of Robert Colchin, John Bryant (both of Bromley), and 'J. Harris' (Addington). It is not known which of John or Joe Harris was playing. Hodsoll's Side won by 7 runs.

== Colchin v Newland ==
Two of the biggest matches of the season were played 26 June and 5 July on the Artillery Ground. The first was publicised as Long Robin's XI v Richard Newland's XI. Robert Colchin was nicknamed 'Long Robin' because of his height. The teams for the first match were named, some of the players for the first time. No details of the scores were reported, but the result was a victory for Long Robin's XI by 'over 70 runs'.

Long Robin's XI were Robert Colchin (captain), Tom Faulkner, James Bryant, Joe Harris, Broad, Hodge, Val Romney, George Jackson, Robert Lascoe, John Harris, and John Bowra.

Newland's XI were Richard Newland (captain), John Bryant, Norton, Jacob Mann, Little Bennett, Martin, Howlett, Tall Bennett, William Anderson, Norris, and Howard.

The match was 'arranged by the noblemen and gentlemen of the London Club'.

The fixture was repeated on 5 July, but the players were not named. It was between the same teams but it was publicised differently as 'Sevenoaks, Bromley & Addington versus Slindon, Horsmonden, Chislehurst & London'. As before, it was arranged by the London Club. No details of the play are known, but the result was another win for Long Robin's XI, this time by 5 wickets.

== Surrey v Sussex ==
Surrey and Sussex played three inter-county matches against each other. The first was played Monday, 19 August on the Artillery Ground, and Surrey won 'by several notches'. The match was reported in the St James Evening Post on the same and the next day. Richard Newland played for Sussex. It was on the same day that Charles Edward Stuart raised his standard at Glenfinnan to formally begin the '45 Rebellion. The rebellion had little, if any, impact on cricket in south-east England.

Two days later, on the 21st, the teams met again on Moulsey Hurst, but the result is unknown. On the day of the match, the Daily Advertiser announced: 'The Streatham Captain (i.e., George Williams), with his Flying Squadron of Red Caps, will attend at his grand Tent, to entertain Gentlemen with a cold Collation, the best French Wines, and other Liquours'.

The final match, possibly a decider if Sussex won on the 21st, took place 9 September on Bury Hill, Arundel, also called Berry Hill. Sussex were apparently a man short before this game began, and Richmond sent Adam Newland to fetch Martin of Henfield. They arrived in time, and Martin's reward for coming was a fee of two guineas—double the amount paid to Newland and the other Sussex players. It would seem that Surrey won the game in view of a comment made by Lord John Philip Sackville in a letter dated Saturday, 14 September to the Duke of Richmond, Sussex's patron: 'I wish you had let Ridgeway play instead of your stopper behind it might have turned the match in our favour'.

== Matches with unknown results ==
A combined Addington & Lingfield team were due to play twice against Surrey on 22 July and 16 September, both matches on the Artillery Ground. John Bryant and Little Bennett were to be given men for Surrey. Other matches with no reports were Croydon v Lambeth, 23 July on Kennington Common; Kingston v Lambeth, next day, also on the Common; Addington v Lingfield, 3 August at Addington Hills; and London v Kingston, 7 August on the Artillery Ground.

== Other events by date ==
Friday, 10 May. The Ipswich Journal reported that: 'All lovers of Cricket are hereby desired to meet at Gray's Coffee House (in Norwich) on Friday 17th inst. at 6 pm to settle rules for that manly diversion'. The meeting may have been to discuss the (new?) version of the Laws of Cricket which had been published the previous year. The report is the earliest known mention of cricket in the county of Norfolk.

Friday, 26 July. A ladies match took place on Gosden Common, near Guildford, between 'XI Maids of Bramley' and 'XI Maids of Hambledon'. They all dressed in white but the Hambledon lasses wore red ribbons on their heads and the Bramley lasses wore blue. This is Hambledon near Godalming in Surrey, incidentally. Bramley is another Surrey village, also close to Godalming. A further report says the ladies played a return match at Hambledon, Surrey on Tues 6 August.

Saturday, 28 September. Hills of Kent v Dales of Kent. This match was originally arranged for Monday, 23 September, and it was stated to have been the third between these teams, each having previously won once. In one report, the venue was given as Mr Smith's, a possible reference to George Smith, who was the keeper of the Artillery Ground. The result is unknown.

== First mentions ==
=== Counties ===
- Norfolk

=== Clubs and teams ===
- Addington & Lingfield (combined)
- Lambeth
- William Hodsoll's XI aka William Hodsoll's Side

=== Venues ===
- Addington Hills

=== Players ===
name	club/county	notes
William Anderson	London	Mentioned in match reports from 1745 to 1752. It is believed a benefit match was held for him in 1753.
Broad	Addington and Surrey	Mentioned in match reports from 1745 to 1750.
Howard	Kent	Mentioned in match reports from 1745 to 1752.
Robert Lascoe	Bromley and Kent	Mentioned in match reports from 1745 to 1748.
Hodge	Long Robin's XI	All were named ahead of the Long Robin's XI v Richard Newland's XI match.
Jacob Mann	Richard Newland's XI	All were named ahead of the Long Robin's XI v Richard Newland's XI match.
Martin	Richard Newland's XI	All were named ahead of the Long Robin's XI v Richard Newland's XI match.
Norton	Richard Newland's XI	All were named ahead of the Long Robin's XI v Richard Newland's XI match.

== Bibliography ==
- ACS (1981). A Guide to Important Cricket Matches Played in the British Isles 1709–1863. Nottingham: ACS. OCLC 85045528.
- Bowen, Rowland (1970). Cricket: A History of its Growth and Development. London: Eyre & Spottiswoode. ISBN 978-04-13278-60-9.
- Buckley, G. B. (1935). Fresh Light on 18th Century Cricket. Birmingham: Cotterell & Co. OCLC 23450280.
- Buckley, G. B. (1937). Fresh Light on pre-Victorian Cricket. Birmingham: Cotterell & Co. OCLC 23469107.
- Maun, Ian (2009). From Commons to Lord's, Volume One: 1700 to 1750. Cambridge: Roger Heavens. ISBN 978-19-00592-52-9.
- Underdown, David (2000). Start of Play. Westminster: Allen Lane. ISBN 978-07-13993-30-1 – via Internet Archive.
- Waghorn, H. T. (1899). Cricket Scores, Notes, &c. From 1730–1773. Edinburgh: Blackwood. OCLC 1086375331.
