= 1750 English cricket season =

Cricket season review

The 1750 English cricket season saw the deaths of Robert Colchin ("Long Robin") and Charles Lennox, 2nd Duke of Richmond. A total of twelve historically important matches were recorded. Single wicket remained popular; in the eleven-a-side form, Kent played Surrey in three inter-county matches. (Note: Any match listed in the ACS' Important Match Guide (1981) is historically important, and therefore of the highest standard, whether or not a scorecard might exist. The same applies to numerous matches discovered by researchers since 1981. For further information, see First-class cricket.)

== Kent v Surrey ==
On Friday, 6 July, Kent played Surrey on Dartford Brent. Surrey scored 57 and 36; Kent replied with 54 and 40/7 to win by 3 wickets. No individual scores are known, but the teams were:

- Kent: William Hodsoll, Rawlings, James Bryant, John Bryant, Garrett, John Bell, Broad, Thomas Bell, Val Romney, Thomas Brandon, Howard.
- Surrey: Stephen Dingate, Tom Faulkner, Joe Harris, John Harris, George Jackson, Robert Bartholomew, John Frame, Frame, Maynard, John Capon, Perry.

The first name of John Frame's brother is unknown. Kent were without Robert Colchin, who had died in April, aged 36.

There was a return match three days later on the Artillery Ground. Kent scored 53 and 55; Surrey replied with 80 and 29/1 to win with some ease, by 9 wickets. The teams were unchanged from the first match but, again, no individual scores are known.

The third match, which may have been arranged as a decider, was played 20 July on the Artillery Ground. Surrey scored 55 and 42; Kent replied with 63 and 35/9 to win a very tight contest by 1 wicket. Five runs were still needed when the penultimate wicket fell. The teams were unchanged from the two previous matches but again there are no individual scores. The London Club ruled beforehand that players must reside in the county they play for. The Frames still lived at Warlingham in 1750, though John Frame was latterly associated with Dartford.

== Dartford v Addington ==
In a match played Tuesday, 17 July, Dartford hosted Addington on Dartford Brent.

Dartford scored 46 and 34; Addington replied with 39 and 35, so Dartford won by 6 runs. William Hodsoll and the two Bryants all played for Dartford as given men. According to the London Evening Post on Thursday, 19 July, Dartford lost five second innings wickets in five successive deliveries by a mixture of caught and bowled, but they still made enough to win. The source says: "It is remarkable Dartford had five men bowled and caught out in five succeeding bowls the last hands".

== Single wicket matches ==
On Thursday, 26 July, Five of Richmond played Five of London for a guinea a man on the Artillery Ground. No details are known.

During September, there was a series of "fives" between Stephen Dingate's Five and Tom Faulkner's Five. All three matches were played on the Artillery Ground. The first match on Monday, 10 September was played for fifty guineas. Faulkner's Five won this one. The teams were:

- Stephen Dingate, James Bryant, John Bryant, John Bell, and Thomas Bell
- Tom Faulkner, Joe Harris, John Harris, William Durling, and Perry.

The second match on Friday, 14 September ended in a tie, both teams totalling nine. As single-wicket rules applied, all batsmen were out. It is known they were all bowled (but not by whom), except for Dingate who was caught in the second innings; Thomas Bell, who was run out in the second innings; and Joe Harris who was caught in the second innings while he was apparently trying to hit the winning run.

The third and deciding game on Monday, 17 September was won by Faulkner's Five by an innings and one run. Dingate's Five scored 10 and 18, but Faulkner's Five scored 29. The individual figures in the recorded score of the Dingate second innings add up to 20, but 18 was definitely the correct total so one or more of the individual scores was wrong.

A game was announced for Monday, 24 September between Five of London and Five of Addington but nothing further is known.

== Deaths ==
Robert Colchin (1713–1750), also known as "Long Robin", died at Deptford on or about Monday, 27 April. The cause was apparently smallpox.

Charles Lennox, 2nd Duke of Richmond (1701–1750), who was arguably the greatest of the game's early patrons, died at Godalming on Wednesday, 8 August.

== Other events ==
Rowland Bowen recorded cricket being "played by the military" at Perth, the earliest known mention of the game in Scotland.

In At the Sign of the Wicket, F. S. Ashley-Cooper gives the opinion that the Hambledon Club was founded in or about 1750, but there is no evidence to support this view, and the club's origin remains unknown.

A match between "Two Elevens" was arranged for Monday, 18 June, on the Artillery Ground. The unnamed teams played for 50 guineas, and were composed entirely of players from Kent, London, Middlesex, and Surrey. The result is unknown.

On Friday, 20 July, Bearsted played Hadlow at an unknown venue. There was a one-line announcement in the Kentish Weekly Post on Saturday, 21 June. No other details are known.

On Wednesday, 8 August, London played Hampton on the Artillery Ground. No details were reported.

== First mentions ==
=== Countries ===
- Scotland (re a military match in Perth)

=== Players ===
- Robert Bartholomew (Surrey)
- Thomas Brandon (Dartford/Kent)
- Frame (Surrey)
- Garrett (Kent)
- Rawlings (Kent)

== Bibliography ==
- ACS (1981). A Guide to Important Cricket Matches Played in the British Isles 1709–1863. Nottingham: ACS. OCLC 85045528.
- Bowen, Rowland (1970). Cricket: A History of its Growth and Development. London: Eyre & Spottiswoode. ISBN 978-04-13278-60-9.
- Buckley, G. B. (1935). Fresh Light on 18th Century Cricket. Birmingham: Cotterell & Co. OCLC 23450280.
- Maun, Ian (2009). From Commons to Lord's, Volume One: 1700 to 1750. Cambridge: Roger Heavens. ISBN 978-19-00592-52-9.
