= Val Romney =

English cricketer (1718–1773

Valentine Romney (1718 – December 1773) was an English cricketer who played during the 1740s. A top-class player, he made numerous appearances in historically important matches, both eleven-a-side and single wicket. Apparently a specialist batsman, he was mainly associated with Sevenoaks and Kent, but he also played for England teams. Information about his career is limited by a lack of surviving data, although he is known to have made 11 single wicket and 14 eleven-a-side appearances between 1743 and 1751. Romney was noted for his leadership, and described by James Love as a "mighty" player. (Note: Matches at this time were played on rudimentary pitches with a two-stump wicket. The batter used a curved bat and the bowler delivered the ball with an underarm action by bowling it all along the ground. The sport underwent an evolutionary change in the 1760s when bowlers began pitching the ball, still using an underarm action, and the modern straight bat was introduced in response.) (Note: Scorecard data till at least 1825 was never comprehensive, especially the dismissal information: bowling analyses lacked balls bowled and runs conceded; bowlers were not credited with wickets when the batsman was caught or stumped; in many matches, the means of dismissal were omitted.)

== Cricket career ==
=== First mention ===
The first definite mention of Val Romney is dated 11 July 1743, when he took part in a single wicket "threes" match at the Artillery Ground, and the six players were stated to be "the best in England". They were William Hodsoll, John Cutbush, and Romney playing as Three of Kent; and Richard Newland, William Sawyer, and John Bryant playing as Three of England. Hodsoll and Newland were the captains. Kent won by 2 runs. The London Evening Post estimated a crowd of 10,000. A return match was arranged at Sevenoaks Vine on 27 July, but "it did not come off".

=== 1744 to 1745 ===
Romney was lauded as a "mighty play'r" in Cricket, An Heroic Poem (1745) by James Love. This poem was written to commemorate a celebrated match between Kent and England at the Artillery Ground on 18 June 1744, in which Romney was the captain of Kent.

In August and September of the same year, Romney played for the London Cricket Club in three matches against Surrey. They first met at Moulsey Hurst on Friday, 24 August, and London won. Robert Colchin and Romney played as given men for London. The stakes for this match were reported to be "£50 a side". There was a return match the following Monday, 27th, at the Artillery Ground, and London with Colchin and Romney were again the winners. A third match was scheduled at the Artillery Ground for Friday, 7 September with Romney playing for London, but no post-match details are known.

At the end of the 1744 season, Romney played in two "threes" matches at the Artillery Ground. The first was billed as "Long Robin's Side v Stephen Dingate's Side", the teams being Robert Colchin, Romney, and John Bryant against Richard Newland, Edward Aburrow Sr (replacing John Mills), and Joe Harris. The stake was two hundred guineas, and the players involved were stated to be the "best in England". In the second match on 1 October, the teams were Robert Colchin, James Bryant, and Joe Harris versus Romney, John Bryant, and Thomas Waymark.

In the 1745 season, Romney again played in a major "threes" match at the Artillery Ground on 24 June, when he was teamed with William Hodsoll and Richard Newland against Robert Colchin, John Bryant, and one of the Harris brothers. Hodsoll, Newland, and Romney won by 7 runs. Another important match took place two days later between Long Robin's XI and Richard Newland's XI at the Artillery Ground. Long Robin's XI, including Romney, won "by over 70 runs".

Two of the biggest matches of the 1745 season were played 26 June and 5 July on the Artillery Ground. The first was publicised as Long Robin's XI v Richard Newland's XI. The teams for the first match were named, some of the players for the first time. No details of the scores were reported, but the result was a victory for Long Robin's XI by "over 70 runs". The match was "arranged by the noblemen and gentlemen of the London Club".

Long Robin's XI were Robert Colchin (captain), Tom Faulkner, James Bryant, Joe Harris, Broad, Hodge, Val Romney, George Jackson, Robert Lascoe, John Harris, and John Bowra.

Newland's XI were Richard Newland (captain), John Bryant, Norton, Jacob Mann, Little and Tall Bennett, Martin, Howlett, William Anderson, Norris, and Howard.

The fixture was repeated on 5 July, but the players were not named. It was between the same teams but it was publicised differently as "Sevenoaks, Bromley & Addington versus Slindon, Horsmonden, Chislehurst & London". As before, the match was "arranged by the noblemen and gentlemen of the London Club". No details of the play are known, but the result was another win for Long Robin's XI, this time by 5 wickets.

=== 1746 to 1747 ===
On 6 August 1746, there was a three-a-side game between Long Robin's Side and Stephen Dingate's Side in the Artillery Ground involving "six players esteemed the best in England". The teams were Robert Colchin, John Bryant (both Bromley), and Joe Harris (Addington) versus Stephen Dingate (Surrey), Val Romney (Sevenoaks), and Richard Newland (Slindon). Dingate's team won the match. Hundreds of pounds were lost and won over the game. Newspapers pre-announcing the event named John Harris in Long Robin's team, but it was his brother Joe who actually played.

In 1747, Romney played for Kent against England on 31 August, at the Artillery Ground; and on 2 September, on Bromley Common. On 5 September, there was a "threes" game at the Artillery Ground billed as "Long Robin's Side v Stephen Dingate's Side". The teams were Robert Colchin, John Harris, and Romney against Stephen Dingate, Richard Newland, and Thomas Jure. It was played for sixty guineas per side, and the players were especially chosen from those who had played in the two Kent v England games.

On Saturday, 5 September 1747, there was a three-a-side game at the Artillery Ground between Long Robin's Three and Stephen Dingate's Three. The teams were Robert Colchin (alias Long Robin), John Harris, and Val Romney against Stephen Dingate, Richard Newland, and Thomas Jure. It was played for sixty guineas per side, and the players were specially chosen from those who had played in the Kent v England games above, so possibly they were the best performers in those matches. It was ruled that "all Strokes behind as well as before Wickets" counted, and in this respect the contest "differs from any Three Match ever play'd".

=== 1748 to 1750 ===
In 1748, Romney is recorded in two single wicket matches. On 8 August, he and Colchin opposed Tom Faulkner and Joe Harris at "twos" in the Artillery Ground for twenty guineas a team. On 29 August, he took part in a "fives" game at the Artillery Ground in which Tom Faulkner's Side won against Long Robin's Side by four runs. The prize was 200 pounds. Romney was injured but chose to play, possibly because rules stated one was to either "play or pay". The teams were Faulkner, Joe Harris, James Bryant, John Bryant, and William Durling versus Colchin, Romney, John Larkin, Jones, and Maynard.

In 1749, Romney made appearances for England against Surrey at Dartford Brent, and for Long Robin's XI against Stephen Dingate's XI at the Artillery Ground. In July he played for England in a "fives" match" against Addington. There is one mention of Romney in 1750 when he was in the Kent team that defeated Surrey by 3 wickets in an important match at Dartford Brent.

=== Last known season ===
1751 is Romney's last known season although there is a possibility he may have continued for a few more years. Surviving data about matches in the 1750s is scarce, and there was a general reduction in matches, caused initially by the deaths of key patrons, and then compounded by the impact of the Seven Years' War. Romney made two appearances in May 1751 when he played for Kent against England. Kent, weakened by the recent death of Robert Colchin, were defeated in both games.

Val Romney's last recorded appearance was in a single wicket "fives" match for Kent against Surrey at the Artillery Ground on 3 June 1751. Kent won "although the betting was in favour of Surrey".

== Legacy ==
F. S. Ashley-Cooper says of Romney that "he was a most famous player, his name being found in nearly all the great matches of his time", and that "as a batsman and single wicket player he was very celebrated".

== Personal life ==
Romney lived mostly at Sevenoaks, and was employed by the 1st Duke of Dorset as head gardener at Knole House, a post later occupied by John Minshull. By 1768, the Sackvilles continued rewarding him with a Christmas gratuity of two guineas.

== See also ==
- 1743 English cricket season
- 1744 English cricket season
- 1745 English cricket season
- 1746 English cricket season
- 1747 English cricket season
- 1748 English cricket season
- 1749 English cricket season
- 1750 English cricket season
- 1751 English cricket season
- Addington Cricket Club
- Edward Aburrow Sr
- History of English cricket (1726–1750)
- List of English cricketers (1701–1786)
- List of Kent county cricketers to 1842
- Richard Newland (cricketer)
- Stephen Dingate
- William Sawyer (cricketer)

== Bibliography ==
- ACS (1981). A Guide to Important Cricket Matches Played in the British Isles 1709–1863. Nottingham: ACS. OCLC 85045528.
- Altham, H. S.; Swanton, E. W. (1962). A History of Cricket, Volume 1 (to 1914) (5th ed.). London: George Allen & Unwin. OCLC 894274808.
- Haygarth, Arthur (1996) [1862]. Scores & Biographies, Volume 1 (1744–1826). Kennington: Frederick Lillywhite. ISBN 978-19-00592-23-9.
- Haygarth, Arthur (1997) [1862]. Scores & Biographies, Volume 2 (1827–1840). Kennington: Frederick Lillywhite. ISBN 978-19-00592-23-9.
- James Love, Cricket, An Heroic Poem (ed. F. S. Ashley-Cooper), Richards, 1922
- Maun, Ian (2009). From Commons to Lord's, Volume One: 1700 to 1750. Cambridge: Roger Heavens. ISBN 978-19-00592-52-9.
- McCann, Tim (2004). Sussex Cricket in the Eighteenth Century (PDF). Vol. 88. Lewes: West Sussex Record Office. ISBN 978-08-54450-55-8.
- Underdown, David (2000). Start of Play. Westminster: Allen Lane. ISBN 978-07-13993-30-1 – via Internet Archive.
- Waghorn, H. T. (1899). Cricket Scores, Notes, &c. From 1730–1773. Edinburgh: Blackwood. OCLC 1086375331.
- Waghorn, H. T. (2005) [1906]. The Dawn of Cricket. London: J. W. McKenzie. ISBN 978-09-47821-17-3.
- Webber, Roy (1951). The Playfair Book of Cricket Records. London: Playfair Books Ltd. OCLC 753176177.
