= Robert Colchin =

English cricketer (1713–1750)

Personal information
- Born: November 1713; Chailey, Sussex
- Died: 29 April 1750 (aged 36); Deptford, Kent
- Nickname: Long Robin
- Batting: Right-handed
- Bowling: Underarm; pace unknown
- Role: All-rounder

Robert Colchin aka Long Robin (bapt. 12 November 1713 – 29 April 1750) was an English cricketer and match organiser of the mid-Georgian period, at a time when the single wicket version of the game was popular. An all-rounder, he is widely regarded as one of the greatest players of the 1740s.

Colchin's exact date and place of birth are uncertain, but he was christened at Chailey, Sussex, on 12 November 1713. He died in Deptford on 29 April 1750, and was buried in Bromley. Also known as "Long Robin" because he was tall, Colchin was a controversial figure. A top-class player, he made numerous appearances in historically important matches, both eleven-a-side and single wicket. (Note: Matches at this time were played on rudimentary pitches with a two-stump wicket. The batter used a curved bat and the bowler delivered the ball with an underarm action by bowling it all along the ground. The sport underwent an evolutionary change in the 1760s when bowlers began pitching the ball, still using an underarm action, and the modern straight bat was introduced in response.) (Note: Scorecard data till at least 1825 was never comprehensive, especially the dismissal information: bowling analyses lacked balls bowled and runs conceded; bowlers were not credited with wickets when the batsman was caught or stumped; in many matches, the means of dismissal were omitted.)

== Life and career ==
Colchin lived in Bromley for several years and was associated with the local Bromley Cricket Club, which was prominent through the 1740s, but declined after his death. Widely known as "Long Robin" because he was tall, he was one of the best batsmen of his day. In addition to his prowess as a single wicket player, Colchin played for Kent in eleven-a-side matches, including the celebrated match against England at the Artillery Ground in July 1744. Colchin had strong associations with the Artillery Ground, and is known to have promoted many matches there, often forming and leading his own team which, in eleven-a-side matches, was called Long Robin's XI, or Long Robin's Side in single wicket games.

Colchin was an outstanding single wicket player, and took part in several big money contests. Single wicket was the most lucrative form of cricket in the 1740s. For example, Colchin and Thomas Waymark played two "doubles" (two-a-side) matches against Tom Faulkner and Joe Harris at the Artillery Ground in 1748. At the time, these four were arguably the best players in England. The matches were played for huge prizes of fifty guineas each. Colchin and Waymark won them both, the first by 12 runs, and the second by an unrecorded margin.

== 1743 ==
In 1743, London played the Kingston & Richmond (K&R) team twice. These matches were played 4 July on Richmond Green, and 18 July on the Artillery Ground. In the first match, Robert Colchin ("Long Robin") of Bromley Cricket Club played for London as a given man. This is the earliest mention of Colchin in the sources. (Note: Colchin was 29 in the 1743 season, so it may reasonably be assumed that his career began in the 1730s, but there is no mention of him in that decade's few sources.) London won by an unknown margin. In the return match, Colchin again played for London as a given man. Scores are known: London 57 and 117; K&R 55 and 52, so London won by 67 runs.

On Monday, 25 July 1743, London met Addington on the Artillery Ground. Addington is about 3 miles south-east of Croydon, and this was the club's first game in London. They had a very strong eleven for some years, and the club immediately accepted the Slindon challenge, in 1744, to play against "any parish in England". Colchin and Tom Peake of Chelsfield played for Addington as given men; William Sawyer of Richmond played for London as a given man. London, batting first, made 32 and 74. Addington in their only innings scored 110, and so won by an innings and 4 runs.

== 1744 ==
Colchin played for Kent v England at the Artillery Ground on 18 June 1744. He scored 7 in the first innings and 9 in the second.

There were three matches between London and Surrey. They first met at Moulsey Hurst on Friday, 24 August, and London won. Colchin and Val Romney played as given men for London. The stakes for this match were reported to be "£50 a side". There was a return match the following Monday, 27th, at the Artillery Ground, and London with Colchin and Romney were again the winners. A third match was scheduled at the Artillery Ground for Friday, 7 September with Romney playing for London, but no post-match details are known.

On Monday, 17 September 1744, a three-a-side match was billed as "Long Robin's Side v Richard Newland's Side". The participants were described as "the six best players in England". The teams were Colchin, Romney, and John Bryant against Richard Newland, Edward Aburrow Sr, and Joe Harris. Aburrow replaced John Mills, called the "famous Kent bowler", who was originally chosen. The stake was two hundred guineas. There was another "threes" match on Monday, 1 October, again "for a considerable sum". Colchin, James Bryant, and Joe Harris played against John Bryant, Romney, and Thomas Waymark.

== 1745 ==
A single wicket game between two "threes" was played Monday, 24 June 1745 on the Artillery Ground. The teams were William Hodsoll's Side—William Hodsoll, Val Romney, and Richard Newland—against Long Robin's Side, consisting of Colchin, John Bryant, and "J. Harris". It is not known which of John or Joe Harris was playing. Hodsoll's Side won by 7 runs.

Two of the biggest matches of the 1745 season were played 26 June and 5 July on the Artillery Ground. The first was publicised as Long Robin's XI v Richard Newland's XI. The teams for the first match were named, some of the players for the first time. No details of the scores were reported, but the result was a victory for Long Robin's XI by "over 70 runs". The match was "arranged by the noblemen and gentlemen of the London Club". Long Robin's XI were:

- Robert Colchin (captain), Tom Faulkner, James Bryant, Joe Harris, Broad, Hodge, Val Romney, George Jackson, Robert Lascoe, John Harris, and John Bowra.

Richard Newland's XI were:

- Richard Newland (captain), John Bryant, Norton, Jacob Mann, Little and Tall Bennett, Martin, Howlett, William Anderson, Norris, and Howard.

The fixture was repeated on 5 July, but the players were not named. It was between the same teams, but it was publicised differently as "Sevenoaks, Bromley, and Addington versus Slindon, Horsmonden, Chislehurst, and London". As before, the match was "arranged by the noblemen and gentlemen of the London Club". No details of the play are known, but the result was another win for Long Robin's XI, this time by 5 wickets.

== 1746 ==
On 23 June 1746, Kent and Surrey were scheduled to play on the Artillery Ground. Kent's team consisted entirely of players from Bromley, Bexley, and Sevenoaks; these included Colchin, George Kipps, John Bowra, James Bryant, John Bryant, and Robert Eures.

On 6 August 1746, there was a three-a-side game between Long Robin's Side and Stephen Dingate's Side in the Artillery Ground involving "six players esteemed the best in England". The teams were Colchin, John Bryant (both Bromley), and Joe Harris (Addington) versus Stephen Dingate (Surrey), Val Romney (Sevenoaks), and Richard Newland (Slindon). Dingate's team won the match. Hundreds of pounds were lost and won over the game. Newspapers pre-announcing the event named John Harris in Long Robin's team, but it was his brother Joe who actually played.

== 1747 ==
If it was played, one of the biggest matches of the 1747 season might have been Long Robin's Nine v William Hodsoll's Ten on the Artillery Ground. Planned for 9 July, it was a "scratch match" arranged by members of the London club. The players were mostly from London, Bromley, Dartford, Hadlow, and Slindon. Long Robin's Nine were Colchin, all three—Adam, John, and Richard—Newland brothers, both—James and John—the Bryant brothers, Little Bennett, John Bowra, and Thomas Jure. Hodsoll's Ten were William Hodsoll, Allen, John Bell, Thomas Bell, Broad, Tom Faulkner, one—either Joe or John—of the Harris brothers, and three players from Hadlow who were John Larkin, Jones, and one unnamed team-mate.

On Saturday, 5 September 1747, there was a three-a-side game at the Artillery Ground between Long Robin's Three and Stephen Dingate's Three. The teams were Colchin, John Harris, and Val Romney against Stephen Dingate, Richard Newland, and Thomas Jure. It was played for sixty guineas per side, and the players were specially chosen from those who had played in the Kent v England games above, so possibly they were the best performers in those matches. It was ruled that "all Strokes behind as well as before Wickets" counted, and in this respect the contest "differs from any Three Match ever play'd".

== 1748 to 1750 ==
Colchin continued to be active through the next three seasons (to be continued).

== Personality ==
Away from cricket, Colchin chose to lead a shadowy existence among "low company" and is believed to have been something of an underworld figure. According to a contemporary article about him in The Connoisseur (no. 132, dated 1746): "his greatest excellence is cricket-playing, in which he is reckoned as good a bat as either of the Bennetts); and is at length arrived at the supreme dignity of being distinguished among his brethren of the wicket by the title of Long Robin".

The article added that Colchin's favourite amusement was attending the executions at Tyburn. He had been "born and bred a gentleman, but has taken great pains to degrade himself, and is now as complete a blackguard as those whom he has chosen for his companions". The companions are said to include "the vulgar" among whom Colchin "has cultivated an intimacy with Buckhorse (i.e., John Smith, a noted prizefighter), and is very proud of being sometimes admitted to the honour of conversing with the great Broughton himself (Jack Broughton was probably the most famous prizefighter of the 18th century)".

== Death ==
Colchin died on 29 April 1750, aged 36. He had taken part in an athletics race on 9 April, and a contemporary report said he developed a "surfeit" doing that, "which threw him into the Small-Pox".

== See also ==
- 1739 English cricket season
- 1742 English cricket season
- 1743 English cricket season
- 1744 English cricket season
- 1745 English cricket season
- 1746 English cricket season
- 1747 English cricket season
- 1748 English cricket season
- 1749 English cricket season
- 1750 English cricket season
- 1751 English cricket season
- Addington Cricket Club
- Bromley Common
- Edward Aburrow Sr
- History of English cricket (1726–1750)
- Kent county cricket team (pre-1843)
- List of English cricketers (1701–1786)
- List of Kent county cricketers to 1842
- London Cricket Club
- Pitched delivery bowling
- Richard Newland (cricketer)
- Richmond Green cricket ground
- Samuel Colchin
- Single wicket cricket
- Slindon Cricket Club
- Stephen Dingate
- Thomas Waymark
- Val Romney

== Bibliography ==
- ACS (1981). A Guide to Important Cricket Matches Played in the British Isles 1709–1863. Nottingham: ACS. OCLC 85045528.
- Buckley, G. B. (1935). Fresh Light on 18th Century Cricket. Birmingham: Cotterell & Co. OCLC 23450280.
- Haygarth, Arthur (1996) [1862]. Scores & Biographies, Volume 1 (1744–1826). Kennington: Frederick Lillywhite. ISBN 978-19-00592-23-9.
- Haygarth, Arthur (1997) [1862]. Scores & Biographies, Volume 2 (1827–1840). Kennington: Frederick Lillywhite. ISBN 978-19-00592-23-9.
- Maun, Ian (2009). From Commons to Lord's, Volume One: 1700 to 1750. Cambridge: Roger Heavens. ISBN 978-19-00592-52-9.
- McCann, Tim (2004). Sussex Cricket in the Eighteenth Century (PDF). Vol. 88. Lewes: West Sussex Record Office. ISBN 978-08-54450-55-8.
- Waghorn, H. T. (1899). Cricket Scores, Notes, &c. From 1730–1773. Edinburgh: Blackwood. OCLC 1086375331.
- Waghorn, H. T. (2005) [1906]. The Dawn of Cricket. London: J. W. McKenzie. ISBN 978-09-47821-17-3.
- Webber, Roy (1951). The Playfair Book of Cricket Records. London: Playfair Books Ltd. OCLC 753176177.
