= Richard Newland (cricketer) =

English cricketer (1713–1778)

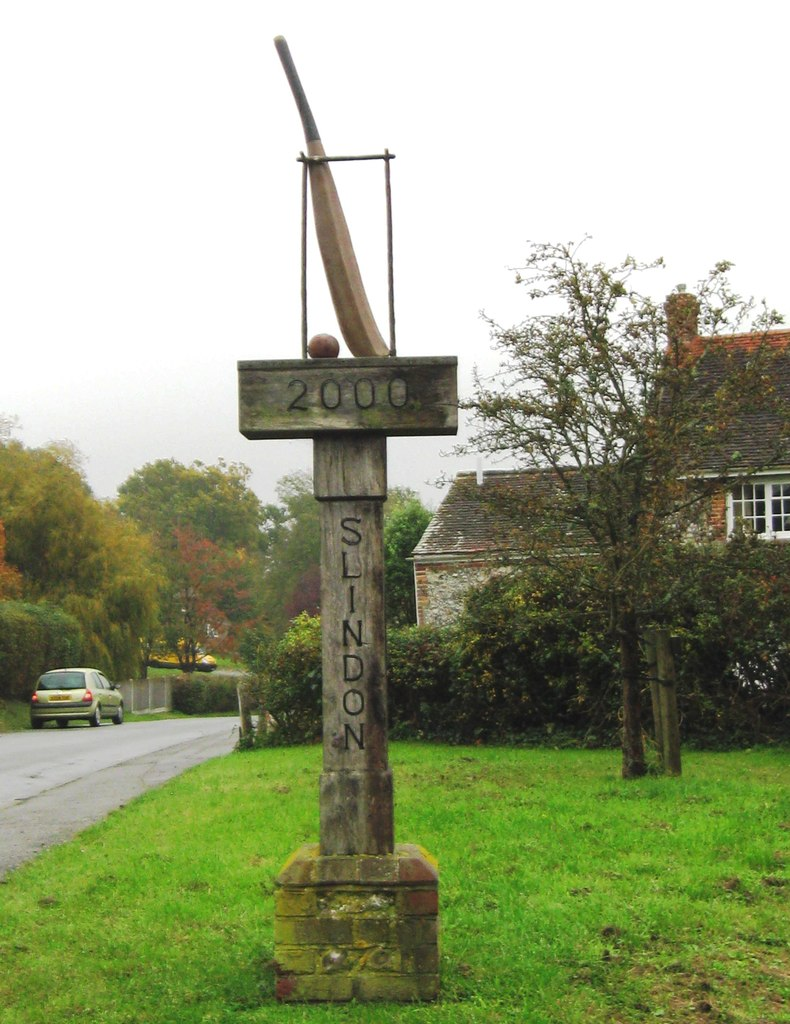
- Monument in Slindon village to commemorate its 1740s cricket team, including Richard Newland

Personal information
- Full name: Richard Newland
- Born: 1713; Slindon, Sussex
- Died: 1778 (aged 64–65)
- Batting: Left-handed
- Role: All-rounder

Domestic team information
- Years: Team
- c.1743 – c.1751: Slindon Cricket Club
- c.1743 – c.1751: Sussex
- c.1744 – c.1746: Richard Newland's XI
- c.1743 – c.1751: England

Richard Newland (bapt. 11 September 1713 – February 1778) was an English cricketer of the mid-Georgian period who played for Slindon and Sussex under the patronage of Charles Lennox, 2nd Duke of Richmond. He also represented various England teams and, in some matches, led his own select team. The eldest of three cricketing brothers, he is generally recognised as one of cricket's greatest early players and has been called a pioneer of the sport.

Newland is cricket's earliest known left-handed batter. He is remembered as a great all-rounder who was proclaimed "The Champion" in a famous poem by James Love. Despite his fame, nothing is known of his bowling arm, style or pace except that he used an underarm action. (Note: Throughout Newland's career as a "pioneer", matches were played on rudimentary pitches with a two-stump wicket. The batter used a bat which was curved at the bottom, although in Newland's day the curve was much less pronounced than earlier in the century, when the bat resembled a modern hockey stick. The bowler delivered the ball along the ground with an underarm action, as in bowls. The sport underwent an evolutionary change in the 1760s when bowlers began pitching the ball, still using an underarm action, and the modern straight bat was introduced in response.) The actual length of Newland's career is unknown and has been the subject of speculation by some writers, but there were 21 senior matches between 1743 and 1751 in which he definitely appeared: 14 eleven-a-side and seven under single wicket rules. In 1745, he made a score of 88 which is the highest individual innings on record until the 1760s.

Newland was an uncle of Richard Nyren, who became captain of Hambledon in the 1760s and 1770s. Newland is said to have been his nephew's mentor. In 1900, the historian F. S. Ashley-Cooper included Newland among his choice of four outstanding 18th-century players, along with John Frame, David Harris, and John Small.

== Family and background ==
Richard Newland was born in 1713 (the parish record reads, born and baptised September 11, 1713) at Slindon, Sussex. His parents were Richard Newland Sr of Slindon and Elizabeth Newland (née Hammond) of Eartham, Sussex. They married in 1704 and had ten children, five brothers and five sisters, all born in Slindon. Newland Sr was a yeoman farmer and Richard Jr became one too. Two of Newland's brothers, John (1717–1800/1804) and Adam (born 1719), also became well-known cricketers. One of the sisters, Susan, married Richard Nyren of Eartham and their eldest son Richard became the famous captain of Hambledon in the 1770s. It is said that Newland taught his nephew to play cricket. Susan and her husband were also the grandparents of John Nyren, who wrote The Cricketers of My Time. (Note: Newland's sister Susan was baptised at Slindon on 12 January 1709/10. She was married to Richard Nyren at Binsted on 4 January 1732/33. John Newland, brother to Richard, was baptised at Slindon on 27 July 1717. Adam Newland was baptised on 13 May 1719 at Slindon, on the same day as his brother Henry.)

Newland's history has been complicated by the existence of a namesake surgeon who became his brother-in-law after he, the cricketer, married the surgeon's sister Mary. The cricketer's dates have been confirmed as 1713–1778 and his surgeon brother-in-law's as 1718–1791. The dates and other details have sometimes been confused in cricket records. It follows that Richard Nyren had two uncles called Richard Newland.

In a letter from Goodwood House, dated Wednesday, 30 July 1740, to his friend Thomas Pelham-Holles, 1st Duke of Newcastle, the 2nd Duke of Richmond mentioned several local people including "John Newland, that you must remember". This is the first mention in the sources of the Newland brothers.

The second recorded mention of the Newlands is in a letter dated 9 July 1741 from the Duchess of Richmond to her husband, Charles Lennox, 2nd Duke of Richmond. She mentions a conversation with John Newland about a Slindon versus East Dean match played a week earlier at Long Down, near Eartham. The first definite mention of Richard Newland in surviving sources is as captain of an England team playing against Kent in a single wicket three-a-side match at the Artillery Ground on 11 July 1743, when he was 29 or 30 years old. (Note: Given his age in 1743, it may reasonably be assumed that Newland's career began in the 1730s, but there is no mention of him in that decade's few sources.)

According to David Underdown, an ancestor called John Newland was a steward in the local manor house at the end of the sixteenth century. The manor belonged to the Kempe family who were Roman Catholics and, in the seventeenth century, Jacobites; they even had a priest hole in the manor house. Richard Newland Sr was a churchwarden, a position of respectability in Georgian times which meant he was, as Underdown puts it, "a solid member of the village community". Despite this apparent respectability, Underdown points out that Slindon was, like most Sussex villages, a violent place with smuggling connections. The Slindon team included Edward Aburrow Sr (alias "Cuddy"), who played as a bowler and was the village tailor. He gained a reputation for smuggling, though it is more accurate to say that he was jailed in 1745 for bearing arms whilst landing "prohibited goods" at Elmer's Sluice on the Sussex coast. In 1749, Newland himself and his brother John were among a group of men indicted for assaulting one Griffith Hughes, though all were discharged, and this incident too may have been connected with smuggling.

== Cricket career ==
=== Duke of Richmond's patronage ===
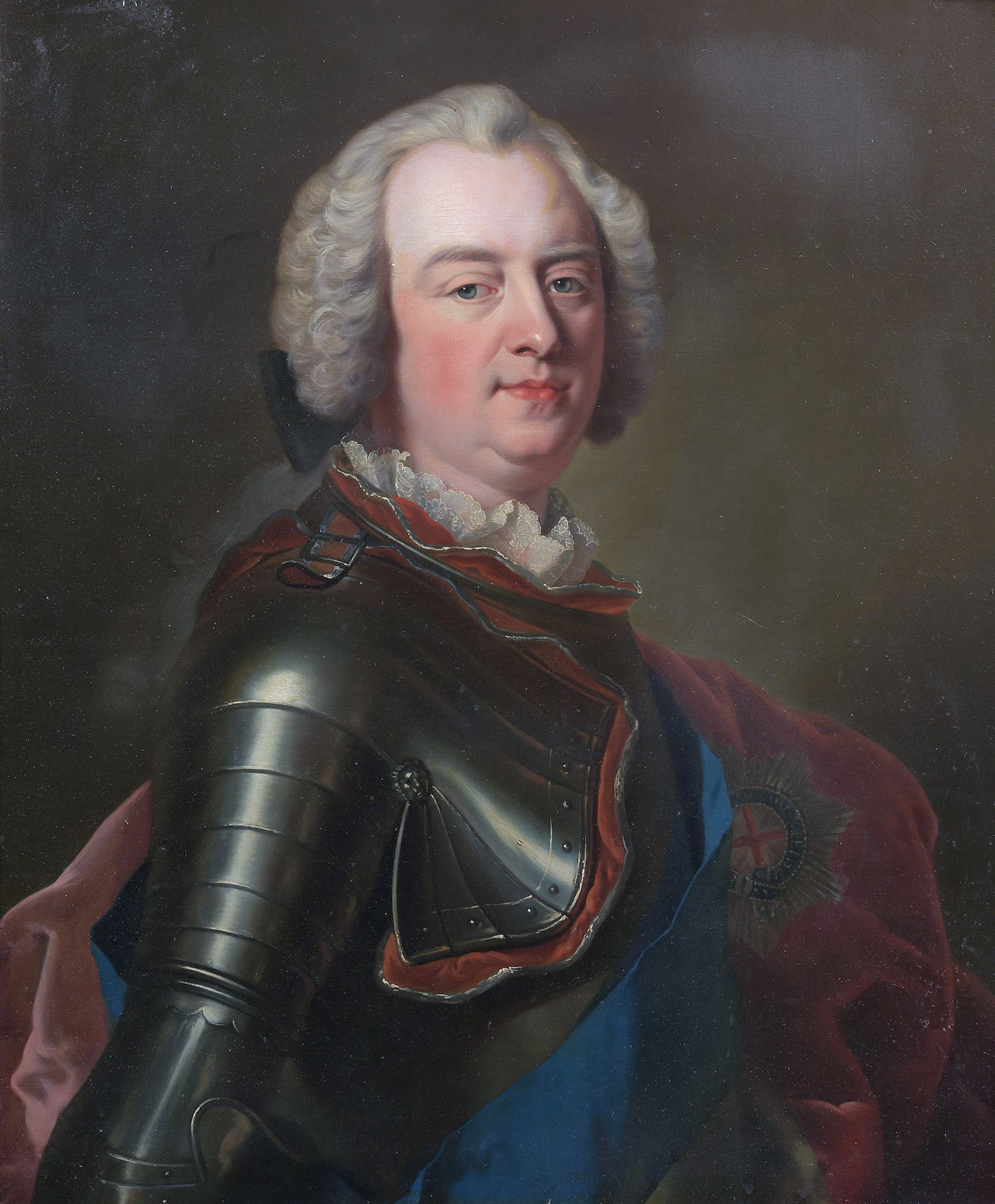
Charles Lennox, 2nd Duke of Richmond

Newland relied for his cricketing opportunities on the 2nd Duke of Richmond, who had captained his own team for many years until he broke a leg in 1733. No longer able to play himself, Richmond channelled his enthusiasm for cricket into his patronage of Slindon Cricket Club. The village of Slindon bordered on his Goodwood House estate. Richmond's commitment to Slindon is evident in letters he wrote to his friend the Duke of Newcastle in 1741. On 28 July, Richmond sent two letters telling Newcastle about a match that day which had resulted in a brawl with "hearty blows" and "broken heads". The match was at Portslade between Slindon, who won, and unnamed opponents. On 7 September, Slindon played Surrey at Merrow Down, near Guildford. Richmond, in a letter to Newcastle before the game, evoked "poor little Slyndon against almost your whole county of Surrey". The next day he wrote again, saying that "wee (sic) have beat Surrey almost in one innings".

=== 1742–1743 ===
Newland was an all-rounder who batted left-handed and he is the earliest known left-handed player in cricket's history. His bowling arm, style and pace are unknown except, like all bowlers of the time, he used the underarm method of delivery with the ball bowled all along the ground. Through the 1740s, he was arguably the best and most famous player in England. He has been described as "The Pioneer of Cricket".

Newland was a popular choice for a wager among the gamblers who frequented matches and bets were always laid on his potential score. There are references in 1742 to "the Sussex Man from Slending" and "the noted bowler from Slendon", although it is not certain that Newland was either of these famous players as he was a batting all-rounder. Slindon's most noted bowler was actually Aburrow. At the end of the 1742 season, Slindon played two matches against London at the Artillery Ground but lost them both, the second by the huge margin of 184 runs. In the first, several wagers were laid that one Slindon batsman, perhaps Newland, would obtain forty runs from his own bat – a feat he failed to perform. F. S. Ashley-Cooper said the batsman was "probably Mr Richard Newland". There is no surviving report of the second match except for the result but Ashley-Cooper in a brief description of Slindon says it was most famous for its cricket, "its chief players being the Messrs. Newland – Adam, John and Richard – and Cuddy".

In the single wicket match on 11 July 1743 (see above), Newland is specifically recorded for the first time as one of the six players who took part in a celebrated three-a-side match between England and Kent at the Artillery Ground. The Daily Advertiser declared that the six players were "the best in England". England's Six were Newland (captain), John Bryant of Bromley, and William Sawyer of Richmond. The Kent players were William Hodsoll of Dartford, Val Romney of Sevenoaks, and John Cutbush of Maidstone. Cutbush was a late replacement for Thomas Ridgeway of Sussex. Kent won by 2 runs. The London Evening Post estimated a crowd of 10,000. A return match was arranged at Sevenoaks Vine on 27 July, but "it did not come off".

=== 1744 ===
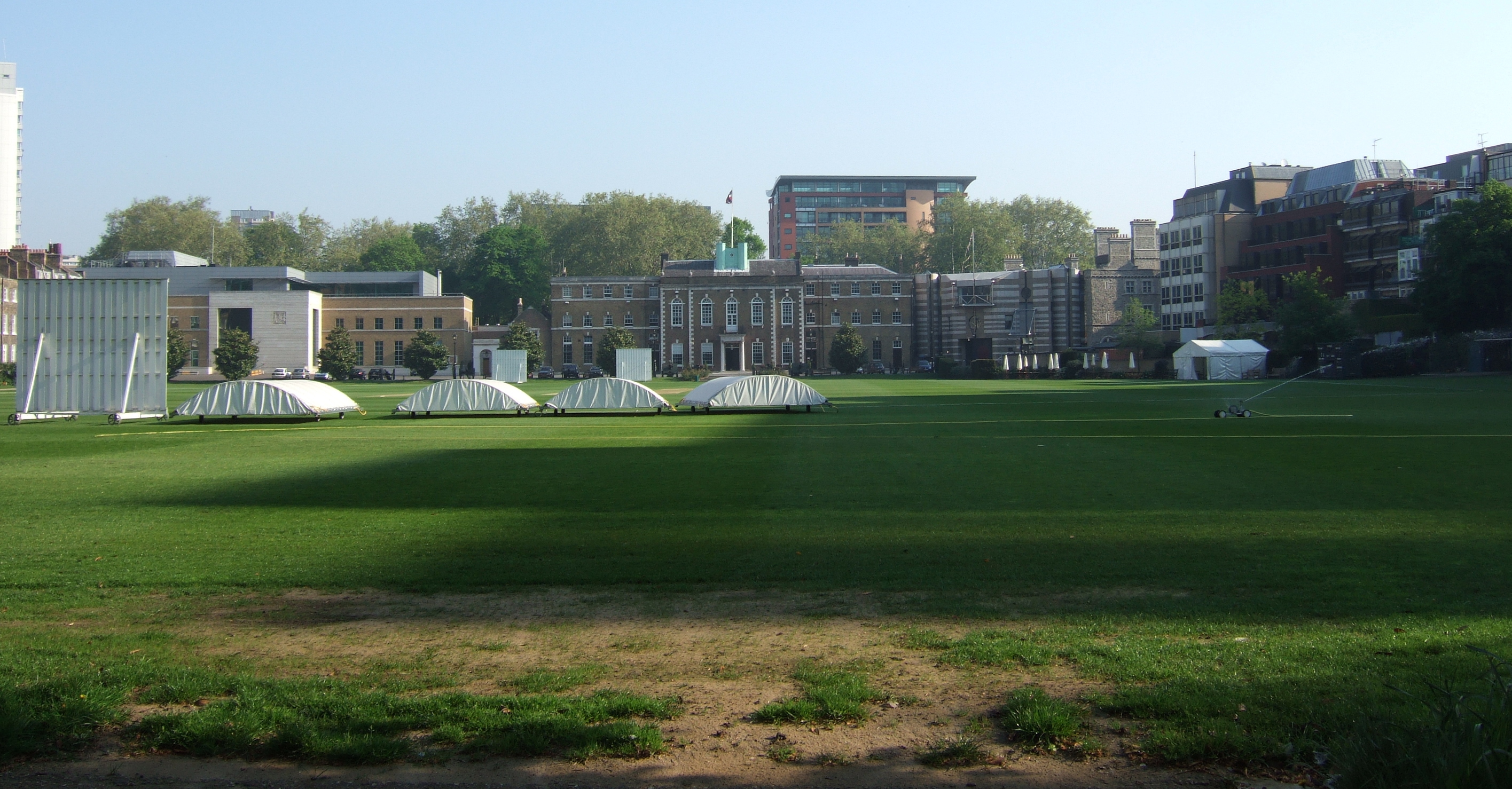
The Artillery Ground in Finsbury was a regular venue for English cricket matches in the 1740s.

By 1744, Newland had begun an apparent rivalry with Robert Colchin (aka Long Robin), who organised a number of games between his team and one picked by Newland. On 2 June, a combined Surrey and Sussex played against London at the Artillery Ground.

Surrey and Sussex won by 55 runs and the match is now famous for the world's oldest known match scorecard, which lists individual scores but no details of dismissals. London, whose team included given men, was the host club and their opponents were all from the counties of Surrey and Sussex. The visitors batted first and scored 102. London replied with 79, so Surrey and Sussex had a first innings lead of 23. In their second innings, Surrey and Sussex reached 102/6 and then apparently declared their innings closed, although the Laws of Cricket did not allow for declarations in 1744. In the final innings, London needed 126 to win but were all out for 70. Newland was out without scoring in both innings. The scorecard was kept by the 2nd Duke of Richmond at Goodwood House.

Two weeks later, Newland played for England against Kent at the Artillery Ground. The match was commemorated in Cricket, An Heroic Poem (1745) by James Love. Newland, who excelled in both the single wicket and eleven-a-side variants, was proclaimed "The Champion" by Love. (Note: Over a century later, the sobriquet of "Champion" was applied to W. G. Grace.) Kent captain Lord John Sackville is reported to have held a remarkable catch in the second innings to dismiss Newland, who made the top two scores in the match with 18* and 15. Sackville's catch may have been the defining moment of the match, which Kent won by one wicket after Cutbush and Hodsoll managed to score the remaining few runs with nine wickets down.

On 10 September, the London club hosted a match against Slindon at the Artillery Ground. Play continued into the next day and, after winning the match by an unknown margin, Slindon issued a challenge to play "any parish in England" and received immediate acceptances from the Addington and Bromley clubs. These matches were arranged to take place at the Artillery Ground over the next few days and it is known that Slindon v Addington began on 12 September. It was impacted by bad weather and Slindon led by two runs at the close of play. There are no surviving reports of play on the 13th. Slindon's match against Bromley was scheduled for 14 September, but there is no record of it having taken place. Newland and Aburrow are known to have played for Slindon against both London and Addington. According to Derek Birley, the Slindon team had a run under Newland's captaincy of 43 matches with only one defeat.

On 17 September, there was a three-a-side match at the Artillery Ground between Colchin's and Newland's teams. Colchin had Val Romney and John Bryant on his team; Newland had Aburrow and Joe Harris. Aburrow was a late replacement for John Mills of Horsmonden, described as "the famous Kent bowler". The stake was 200 guineas and the players were described as the "best in England". The result, however, is unknown.

=== 1745 ===
There are few mentions of Slindon after 1744 and Newland is found playing for England or leading his own team, often in opposition to Colchin's team. On 24 June 1745, Newland was a member of a three-a-side team led by William Hodsoll and including Val Romney. They played against Colchin, John Bryant and one of the Harris brothers at the Artillery Ground and won by 7 runs. The stake was 500 guineas. Two days later, Long Robin's XI defeated Newland's XI at the Artillery Ground by "over 70 runs". There is the usual brief report in a contemporary newspaper but with the difference that it names all 22 players, although no scores are given. Aburrow and Newland's brothers were not named. Colchin had both the Harris brothers and James Bryant; Newland had John Bryant and both of Little and Tall Bennett.

On 5 July, the Artillery Ground hosted a fixture called Sevenoaks, Bromley & Addington v. Slindon, Horsmonden, Chiselhurst & London. It was won by the former but no names or details are known. This is the only mention of Slindon in the 1745 sources.

In a match played 15–16 July, Newland scored 88 for England against Kent at the Artillery Ground. This is the highest individual innings on record until the 1760s and, in the context of 1740s cricket when pitch preparation was little more than rudimentary, an outstanding performance. It is cricket's earliest known half-century as the previous highest score on record was 47 by John Harris for Surrey & Sussex on 2 June 1744. England won the match and a stake of 1,000 guineas.

On 19 August, a report says that a Surrey v Sussex match was played at the Artillery Ground for 200 guineas, that "R. Newland played for Sussex", and that the match was completed in one day; but it does not give the result of the match.

=== 1746–1747 ===
Match reports in 1746 are all extremely brief and Newland is mentioned only once, when he took part in a three-a-side match at the Artillery Ground on 6 August. This report says Colchin, John Bryant and Joe Harris "challenged any three in England". Stephen Dingate, Romney and Newland were chosen to meet them but it does not say who the selectors were and the fact that Dingate's name appears first would indicate that he, and not Newland, was chosen as the team captain. As had been stated on other occasions, "the six players were esteemed the best in England". The report concludes by saying that "hundreds of pounds were lost and won over the game" but it does not give the result of the match.

By 1747, single wicket had superseded the eleven-a-side version as the most popular form of cricket. Richmond orchestrated the fervour and his Slindon five-a-side and three-a-side teams were a regular feature of the "great matches" at the Artillery Ground. However, Newland did not always captain his team in 1747. There was a three-a-side match on 6 September in which he was again opposed by his rival Colchin, but the captaincy of his team had again been given to Dingate, who was a regular fixture in Richmond's teams at this time. Newland had played for England against Kent in two eleven-a-side matches at the Artillery Ground on 31 August and at Bromley Common on 2 September.

Earlier, on 9 July 1747, Newland seemed to be reconciled with Colchin because, for the first time on record, they played for the same team but it was Long Robin's team that Newland was playing for. The match title was Long Robin's IX v. Hodsoll's X, and it was described as a "scratch match" arranged by the London Club. John and Adam Newland also played for Colchin's nine, as did both the Bryant brothers. Apart from most of the 19 names, nothing else is reported. All three Newland brothers played in a five-a-side match at the Artillery Ground on 6 July. The teams were Five of Slindon and Five of Dartford. Newland had issued a challenge through a notice in the Daily Advertiser that Slindon would play against "five of any parish in England". The stake of £20 was somewhat low in comparison with other matches of the time. The result is unknown. Three more of these challenge matches were played 8–15 July, one against Bromley and two against Hadlow. None of the results are known.

=== 1748–1750 ===
The 1748 season was the zenith of single wicket in that records exist of 18 matches, most of them played at the Artillery Ground. Newland, however, is mentioned only once. This was a rescheduled five-a-side match on 27 July (it had been rained off on the 25th) between Stephen Dingate's team and Tom Faulkner's team. The stake was 100 guineas. Newland played for Dingate's team but they lost.

In 1749, Newland played in two eleven-a-side matches for England captained by Colchin. Both were against Surrey. The first was at Dartford Brent on 2–3 June. England scored 89 and 42; Surrey replied with 73 and 59/8 to win by 2 wickets. Surrey's team included sixteen-year-old John Frame. The second match was at the Artillery Ground on 5 June and was drawn.

There is no mention of Newland in the 1750 sources. Cricket suffered a double blow with the deaths of Colchin (end of April) and Richmond (8 August) as they were two of the main match organisers.

== Later years and death ==
Newland's last known appearances were in May 1751, the year after Colchin and then Richmond had died. He played in two matches for England against Kent and was on the winning team both times, in the first by 9 runs and in the second by an innings and 9 runs. Now 38, it seems that, like Sussex cricket in general after the death of Richmond, Newland faded from the scene and returned to his family's farm. He coached his nephew Richard Nyren and taught him how to play cricket. This was Newland's legacy to the sport for Nyren went on to captain the Hambledon Club's teams to great success in the 1760s and 1770s.

Writing in 1900, Ashley-Cooper asserted in his introduction to At the Sign of the Wicket:

Viscere fortes ante Agamemnona, and there were giants before Wilfred Rhodes and K. S. Ranjitsinhji.

Ashley-Cooper's view was that "the old (i.e., 18th century) players possessed that amount of genius which would make them excellent players in any age". He named four outstanding 18th-century players as examples: John Frame, Richard Newland, David Harris and John Small.

Newland's wife Mary died in 1747, aged 24, possibly in childbirth as the grave holding her infant daughter and herself is in Slindon's parish church cemetery. Newland died in February 1778, aged 64 or 65, and was buried on 3 February 1778 at Slindon. (Note: The date of his burial appears to have been 3 February 1778, but with th written in the Bishop's transcripts register for Slindon rather than rd after the date number. The transcription of his burial at Slindon does give the date as 3 February 1778.) His brother-in-law, the surgeon, died in 1791 and is commemorated by a plaque inside the church.

== Bibliography ==
- Altham, H. S.; Swanton, E. W. (1962). A History of Cricket, Volume 1 (to 1914) (5th ed.). London: George Allen & Unwin. OCLC 894274808.
- Ashley-Cooper, F. S. (1929). Kent Cricket Matches, 1719–1880. Canterbury: Gibbs & Sons. OCLC 220674085.
- Barclays (1986). Swanton, E. W.; Plumptre, George; Woodcock, John (eds.). Barclays World of Cricket. London: HarperCollins. ISBN 978-00-02181-93-8.
- Birley, Derek (1999). A Social History of English Cricket. London: Aurum Press. ISBN 978-18-54107-10-7 – via Internet Archive.
- Buckley, G. B. (1935). Fresh Light on 18th Century Cricket. Birmingham: Cotterell & Co. OCLC 23450280.
- Haygarth, Arthur (1996) [1862]. Scores & Biographies, Volume 1 (1744–1826). Kennington: Frederick Lillywhite. ISBN 978-19-00592-23-9.
- Maun, Ian (2009). From Commons to Lord's, Volume One: 1700 to 1750. Cambridge: Roger Heavens. ISBN 978-19-00592-52-9.
- McCann, Tim (2004). Sussex Cricket in the Eighteenth Century (PDF). Vol. 88. Lewes: West Sussex Record Office. ISBN 978-08-54450-55-8.
- Midwinter, Eric (1981). W. G. Grace: His Life and Times. London: George Allen & Unwin. ISBN 978-00-47960-54-3.
- Rae, Simon (1998). W. G. Grace: A Life. London: Faber & Faber. ISBN 978-05-71178-55-1.
- Underdown, David (2000). Start of Play. Westminster: Allen Lane. ISBN 978-07-13993-30-1 – via Internet Archive.
- Waghorn, H. T. (1899). Cricket Scores, Notes, &c. From 1730–1773. Edinburgh: Blackwood. OCLC 1086375331.
- Waghorn, H. T. (2005) [1906]. The Dawn of Cricket. London: J. W. McKenzie. ISBN 978-09-47821-17-3.
