= Slindon Cricket Club =

18th century English cricket club

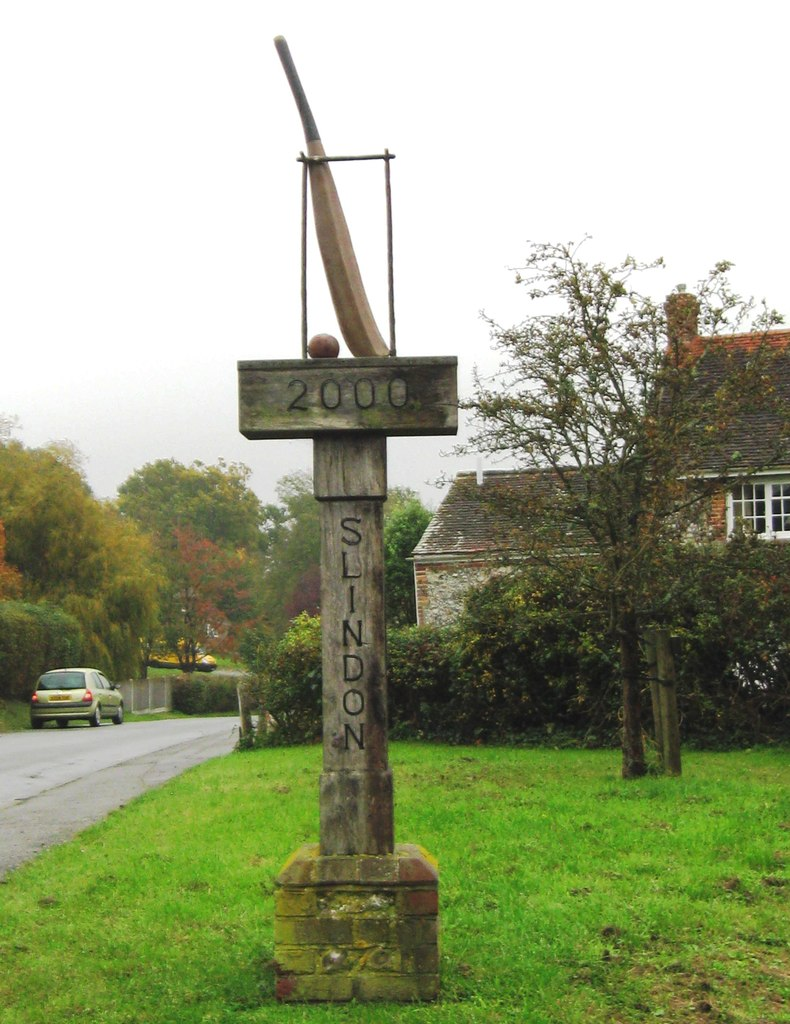

Team information
- Established: before 1740
- Last match: c.1754
- Home venue: Slindon

History
- Notable players: Richard Newland; Edward Aburrow senior

Slindon Cricket Club was famous in the middle part of the 18th century when it claimed to have the best team in England. It was located at Slindon, a village in the Arun district of Sussex, which is near Arundel.

Cricket in the 18th century was funded by gambling interests and some of the wealthier gamblers, acting as patrons, formed whole teams that were representative of several parishes and even of counties. Such a team was "poor little Slyndon (sic) against almost your whole county of Surrey". That quote is taken from a letter written by Slindon's patron, Charles Lennox, 2nd Duke of Richmond (1701–1750) in the 1741 English cricket season. Playing at Merrow Down near Guildford on 1 September, Slindon had just beaten Surrey "almost in one innings".

The Duke of Richmond was the greatest of the sport's early patrons and he did an enormous service to the development of the sport in his native Sussex. He had been active as a player and patron since the 1720s and he lent his benevolence to the little woodland club near Arundel in the late 1730s when he became aware that its residents included three talented brothers, one of whom was showing signs of greatness, and a number of other decent players.

The brothers were the Newlands, among whom Richard was outstanding. Richard Newland (1718 – 29 May 1791), an all-rounder who batted left-handed, became one of the greatest early cricketers and was famous throughout the 1740s. His brothers, about whom little is known, were Adam (born 1714) and John Newland (born 1717). Another good player in the village, although he was an unsavoury one, was the notorious smuggler "Cuddy" whose real name was Edward Aburrow senior. Senior because his son became a regular in the Hambledon team of the 1770s.

It is almost certain that Slindon was not just a village team and that it was in fact a Sussex county team, just as Dartford Cricket Club had always formed the nucleus of the Kent county team. There can be little doubt that Richmond cast his net wide and that players from elsewhere in Sussex played for Slindon. But Richard Newland was the star and he was definitely local. It seems that Richmond built the team around Newland and so it was perhaps natural that the name of the team, even if it were a Sussex county XI, should be that of Newland's village.

== 1741 season ==
The first written record of the Slindon team is on 15 June 1741 when they played against Portsmouth at Stansted Park, Rowlands Castle, near Havant in Hampshire. Slindon won this match by 9 wickets. It is the earliest report of a match involving Slindon, though the club must have been playing for some time beforehand. The 2nd Duke of Richmond in a letter said that "above 5000 people" were present. In a second letter, he gives the result.

On Thursday 9 July 1741, in a letter to her husband, the Duchess of Richmond (1706–1751) mentioned a conversation with John Newland re a Slindon v East Dean match at Long Down, near Eartham, a week earlier. This seems to be the first recorded mention of any of the Newland family.

In two subsequent letters to his friend the Duke of Newcastle, a future Prime Minister, Richmond spoke about a game on Tuesday 28 July which resulted in a brawl with hearty blows and broken heads. The game was at Portslade between Slindon and unnamed opponents. Slindon won the battle but the result of the match is unknown. Richmond had been involved in ruckuses of this sort before and Georgian England was an essentially violent society. It was normal in cricket for the rough to rub shoulders with the smooth.

The poor little Slyndon phrase followed the game against Surrey at Merrow Down on 7 September 1741. Richmond in a letter to Newcastle before the game spoke of "poor little Slyndon against almost your whole county of Surrey". Next day he wrote again, saying that "wee (sic) have beat Surrey almost in one innings".

Soon afterwards, Richmond's wife Sarah, a feisty character in her own right, wrote to him and said she "wish’d..... that the Sussex mobb (sic) had thrash’d the Surrey mob". She had "a grudge to those fellows ever since they mob’d you" (apparently a reference to the Richmond Green fiasco in August of the 1731 English cricket season). She then said she wished the Duke "had won more of their moneys".

== 1742 season ==
The fame of Slindon and the Newlands was established after this beating of Surrey. In August 1742, the report of a London v Croydon game at the Artillery Ground says that "the noted bowler from Slendon (sic) assisted Croydon". This was probably Richard Newland although he was a genuine all-rounder, not just a bowler.

In September, the Slindon team came to the Artillery Ground for probably the first time. London Cricket Club was pre-eminent in the game at that time and had dominated the 1730s. In the two matches on 6 and 10 September, London prevailed. They won the first game "with great difficulty" and then, apparently having been assisted by the weather which made the pitch unplayable, they won the second by 184 runs.

The enthusiasm generated by these matches cannot be overstated. Massive crowds attended and fortunes were gambled on the results and on individual performances. A report states that Slindon came to the Artillery Ground "having played 43 games and lost but one". Richard Newland was heavily backed to score 40 runs off his own bat – a feat he failed to accomplish. Pitch conditions in those days heavily favoured the bowlers and to score 40 then would be like making a century on a modern "flat track".

A report states: "At the conclusion of the above (i.e., second) match Slindon offered to play another match against London either at Guildford or on the South Downs for £100, but the challenge was not accepted".

== 1743 season ==
All quiet on the Slindon front in 1743 which saw the rise of Addington Cricket Club. Unlike Slindon, Addington beat London by an innings. Slindon, it seems, went away to lick its wounds. The only notable mentions of Slindon in 1743 are of Richard Newland personally for he established his reputation as an outstanding single wicket performer.

== 1744 season ==
The year of the famous Slindon Challenge.

Monday 23 April marked the death of Sir William Gage, 7th Baronet (1695–1744) who was one of the greatest of cricket's early patrons, especially in his native Sussex, though it is not actually known if he was involved with Slindon. He always enjoyed a friendly rivalry with Richmond and it is possible he did share in Slindon's fortunes.

The London Daily Advertiser carried various notices from Thursday 31 May until Sunday 3 June which announced that two untitled teams would play in the Artillery Ground on Saturday 2 June. On 31 May, the paper said that the teams would consist of "four gentlemen from Slindon, one from Eastbourne, two from Hamilton (sic) in Sussex, one from Addington and three from Lingfield in Surrey" against "four gentlemen of London, one from Richmond, one from Reigate, three from Addington in Surrey, one from Bray Wick in Berkshire and one from Arundel in Sussex". This was followed by the usual reminder about no dogs and the need to obtain a pass ticket if leaving the ground during play.

The Daily Advertiser changed its notice on Friday 1 June through 2 and 3 June by confusingly announcing the names of the players on each team. However, the names in the paper are not the same as those on the earliest known cricket scorecard kept by the Duke of Richmond. The same (i.e., incorrect) names were also reported on 3 June, the day after the match. The paper announced that the two teams would consist of: Cuddy (i.e., Edward Aburrow senior), Richard Newland, Adam Newland, John Newland, Ridgeway, Green (all of Sussex); William Sawyer, Stevens, Stevens, Collins (all of Surrey); and Norris of London versus Stephen Dingate, John Harris, Joseph Harris, Tom Faulkner, George Jackson, Maynard (all of Surrey); ? Bryant (Bromley), George Smith, ? Bennett, Howlett (all of London); and the famous all-rounder Thomas Waymark, now of Berkshire. No titles were given to the teams.

According to the Duke of Richmond's papers, which are now in the possession of the West Sussex Records Office, including the recorded scores of this match, the teams were somewhat different from those advertised. The scorecard is currently the earliest known in which individual and team scores are recorded but it lacks details of dismissal.

Slindon: Edward Aburrow (aka Cuddy), ? Bryant, Richard Newland, Adam Newland, – Ridgeway, Joseph Harris, George Jackson, John Harris, – Norris, – Andrews, George Smith.

London: – Howlett, Stephen Dingate, William Sawyer, – Maynard, ? Bennett, Tom Faulkner, Thomas Waymark, – Butler, – Green, – Hodder, – Collins.

Both the Harris brothers, John and Joseph, were involved; and of the three Newland brothers it was John who did not play.

Thomas Waymark was formerly employed by the Duke of Richmond but he is here given as a Berkshire resident and playing for the London XI.

The match included a declaration by the Slindon team in their second innings at 102–6. They made 102 & 102–6d against London's scores of 79 & 70. Slindon won by 55 runs.

In September, Slindon again played London at the Artillery Ground and won, but details including the margin of victory have not survived. Having now defeated London twice, Slindon felt emboldened enough to issue a challenge whereby it would play "any parish in England". London did not accept. Only Addington Cricket Club and Bromley Cricket Club were able to accept.

Matches against both these clubs were arranged at the Artillery Ground: against Addington on 12 and 13 September; and against Bromley on 14 September. It is known that rain intervened and no result or match report has survived of either game, even though they are known to have created huge interest. The only conclusion is that they were rained off.

== 1745 to 1749 ==
The single wicket form of the game became increasingly popular in the latter half of the 1740s and Richard Newland was often involved but little is recorded of Slindon after its heroics in 1744.

On 5 July 1745, there was a match at the Artillery Ground between two "best elevens", apparently organised by Robert Colchin and Richard Newland, which was advertised rather wordily as Sevenoaks, Bromley & Addington versus Slindon, Horsmonden, Chislehurst & London!

In the 1747 season, Slindon issued challenges in the highly popular (and lucrative) "fives" version of single wicket.

On Monday 6 July 1747, Five of Slindon played Five of Dartford at the Artillery Ground. This was the result of a challenge by Slindon, published in the Daily Advertiser on Mon 29 June, to play five of any parish in England, for their own Sum. The announcement advised interested parties: If it is accepted of by any, they are desir’d to go to Mr Smith, who has Orders to make Stakes for them. The three Newland brothers all played. "Mr Smith" was George Smith, keeper of the Artillery Ground. On Saturday 4 July, George Smith announced in the same paper that five of Dartford in Kent, have made Stakes with him, and will play with the above Gentlemen at the Time and Place above mentioned for twenty Pounds.

Subsequently, more five-a-side challenges took place on Wednesday 8 July against Bromley and then two matches on 10 and 15 July against the strong Hadlow team from Kent.

== Death of the Duke of Richmond ==
The Duke of Richmond died on Wednesday 8 August 1750 and it could be said that Slindon died with him, especially as the Newlands were by now veteran players with their best years behind them. Richmond's death, following that of his friend Sir William Gage in 1744, had a massive impact on the game in Sussex and the game as a whole was affected only a few months later when the Prince of Wales, another key patron, also died.

An immediate slump ensued from this loss of patronage and then cricket was badly affected by the Seven Years' War from 1756 to 1763.

== "Poor little Slyndon" ==
The last mention of Slindon, now in reality poor little Slyndon, was in a match on 21 and 22 June 1754 against Midhurst & Petworth on Bowling Green, Lavington Common. This was clearly a village match only. Slindon apparently lost by eight wickets and the match seems to mark the great little club's swansong for it was not mentioned in the sources thereafter. Sussex cricket as a whole went into decline and, although a number of inter-parish games were reported over the next decade or so, it was not until 1766 that Sussex again appeared in historically important matches.

References to the Hambledon Club, particularly those in the works of G. B. Buckley, strongly suggest that Hambledon was the organiser of matches played not just by a Hampshire county team but by a combined Hampshire/Sussex. A number of Sussex cricketers are known to have played for Hambledon during its glory days: one of them being Edward "Curry" Aburrow, son of the notorious Slindon smuggler; and another being none other than the club captain Richard Nyren, who was born in Sussex and was the nephew of the three Newland brothers.

== Bibliography ==
- Buckley, G. B. (1935). Fresh Light on 18th Century Cricket. Birmingham: Cotterell & Co. OCLC 23450280.
- McCann, Tim (2004). Sussex Cricket in the Eighteenth Century (PDF). Vol. 88. Lewes: West Sussex Record Office. ISBN 978-08-54450-55-8.
- Waghorn, H. T. (2005) [1906]. The Dawn of Cricket. London: J. W. McKenzie. ISBN 978-09-47821-17-3.
