= Newmarket Heath =

Protected area in Cambridgeshire and Suffolk, England

Coordinates: 52.24°N 0.37°E

- Site of Special Scientific Interest
- Location of Newmarket Heath.
- Area of search: Suffolk
- Grid reference: TL 622 627
- Interest: Biological
- Area: 279.3 hectares
- Notification date: 1993
- Location map: Magic Map

Newmarket Heath is a 279.3-hectare-large (690-acre) biological Site of Special Scientific Interest in Newmarket in Suffolk. It covers most of Newmarket Racecourse.

Most of this site is chalk grassland, and it has areas of chalk heath, a rare habitat in Britain. There is a rich variety of flowering plants, including a nationally rare species listed in the British Red Data Book of threatened species and five nationally uncommon ones. The dominant grasses are upright brome and sheep's fescue.
