= Stephen Dingate =

English cricketer (18th century)

Stephen Dingate (birth and death details unknown) was a leading English cricketer of the mid-Georgian period. He is believed to have begun playing in the 1720s and was one of the best known players in England through the 1740s. Dingate was born at Reigate in Surrey and was employed by the Duke of Richmond. He is reported in one source to have been a barber.

Dingate was a prominent single wicket player who often led his own team, playing for high stakes with and against famous contemporaries like Tom Faulkner, Robert Colchin, William Hodsoll, Richard Newland, Val Romney, William Sawyer, Thomas Waymark and the Bryant and Harris brothers. It is believed that he had been an active player for many years before he was first definitely recorded in June 1744. His last known appearance was in July 1752.

== Known cricket career ==
Dingate's first recorded appearance was on 2 June 1744 when he played in an eleven-a-side match for London against a combined Surrey and Sussex team at the Artillery Ground. Surrey and Sussex won by 55 runs and the match is now famous for the world's oldest known match scorecard, which lists individual scores but no details of dismissals. London, whose team included given men, was the host club and their opponents were all from the counties of Surrey and Sussex. The visitors batted first and scored 102. London replied with 79 but Dingate who was number 2 in the batting order, was out for 0. Surrey and Sussex had a first innings lead of 23. In their second innings, Surrey and Sussex reached 102/6 and then apparently declared their innings closed, although the Laws of Cricket did not allow for declarations in 1744. In the final innings, London needed 126 to win but were all out for 70. Dingate had the top score this time with 19. The scorecard was kept by the 2nd Duke of Richmond at Goodwood House.

Dingate is last known to have played in July 1752.

== Sources ==
- ACS (1981). A Guide to Important Cricket Matches Played in the British Isles 1709–1863. Nottingham: ACS.
- McCann, Tim (2004). Sussex Cricket in the Eighteenth Century. Lewes: Sussex Record Society. ISBN 978-08-54450-55-8.
- Marshall, John (1961). The Duke who was Cricket. London: Frederick Muller Ltd. ASIN B0000CL8HW.
- Maun, Ian (2009). From Commons to Lord's, Volume One: 1700 to 1750. Cambridge: Roger Heavens. ISBN 978-19-00592-52-9.
- Maun, Ian (2011). From Commons to Lord's, Volume Two: 1751 to 1770. Leicester: Martin Wilson. ISBN 978-09-56906-60-1.
