= West Sussex Record Office =

Archive and county record office for West Sussex

Coordinates: 50.8377°N 0.7848°W

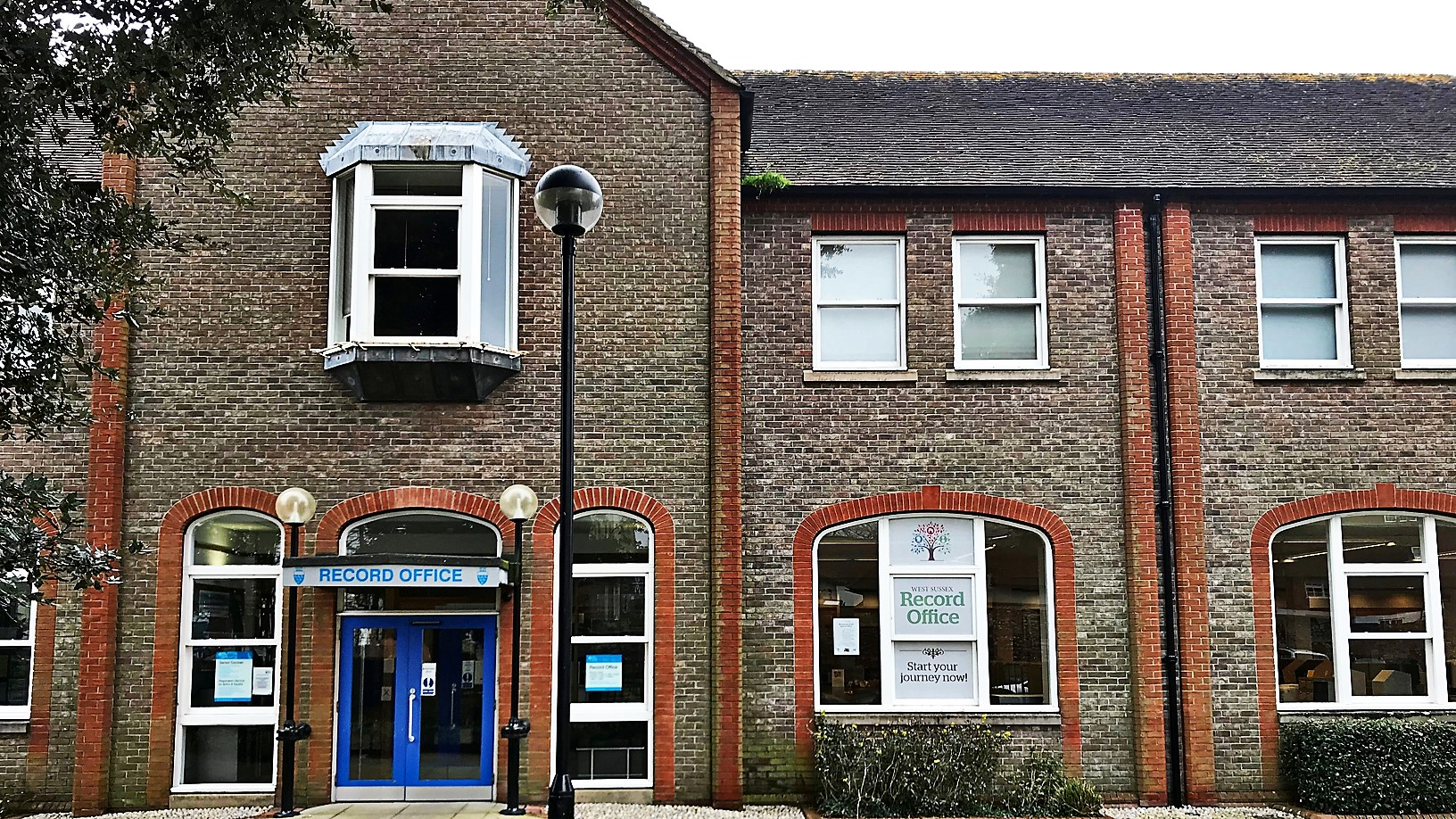
West Sussex County Record Office

The West Sussex Record Office at Orchard Street, Chichester, is the county record office for the county of West Sussex. It is run by West Sussex County Council.

== Notable holdings ==
The record office holds a number of unique collections connected to the area:

- Blunt Manuscripts. The manuscripts of the poet Wilfrid Scawen Blunt.
- Buckle Papers. A collection of papers relating to the naval family of Buckle including Admiral Matthew Buckle.
- Cobden Archives. Archives of the 19th century politician and statesman Richard Cobden.
- Goodwood Archives. Papers of the Dukes of Richmond and Gordon and their estate in Goodwood near Chichester.
- Maxse Papers. The papers of Admiral Frederick Augustus Maxse and his sons, Sir Ivor Maxse and Leo Maxse.
- Petworth House Archives. The largest private collection held by the record office.
- Shillinglee Papers. Mainly deeds relating to the Shillinglee Estate in Kirdford and properties of the Turnour family (the Earls of Winterton from 1734).
- The Sussex Declaration. A parchment manuscript copy of the United States Declaration of Independence found there in April 2017.
- Wiston Archives. A collection of title deeds, settlements and wills relating to the Wiston Estate.

== See also ==
- The Keep, in Brighton holds the records for East Sussex.
