= Addington Cricket Club =

Historical English cricket team

Addington Cricket Club fielded one of the strongest cricket teams in England from about the 1743 season to the 1752 season although the village of Addington is a very small place in Surrey about three miles south-east of Croydon. The team was of county strength and featured the noted players William Durling, Tom Faulkner, Joe Harris, John Harris, and George Jackson. The team immediately accepted the Slindon Challenge, in 1744, to play against any parish in England. The only other club to accept was Robert Colchin's Bromley.

== Matches ==
It is not known when the Addington club was founded and the team played its earliest known game, in London, in 1743. At the Artillery Ground on 25 July, Addington defeated the foremost London Cricket Club by an innings & 4 runs. London scored 32 & 74; Addington 110. Kent players Robert Colchin, aka "Long Robin", and Tom Peake played for Addington as given men while Surrey's William Sawyer was given to London.

It was after Slindon defeated London in September 1744 that it issued its challenge to the rest of England. Addington and Slindon met at the Artillery Ground on 12 and 13 September but the occasion was ruined by bad weather and the match could not be concluded.

Addington and London won a home game each against each other in 1745. The best Addington players were frequently involved in single wicket contests, which were hugely popular throughout the 1740s. They also played often in representative teams. Tom Faulkner in particular was one of the most influential figures in the sport. In 1746, Addington beat Bromley "with great difficulty" on Bromley Common but a return match at the Artillery Ground was inconclusive. In 1747, Addington joined forces with nearby Croydon to play three matches against London: they won one, lost one and one had an unknown result. In 1748, the "best five" Addington players took part in a big single wicket contest against "The Rest of England". One of the Addington five was described as "the shoemaker that lately came out of Kent". It is possible that this shoemaker was Durling, who first made his presence felt that season. Durling's origins are otherwise unknown.

Signs of Addington's decline can be seen at the end of the 1740s. On 10 July 1749, "Five of England" defeated "Five of Addington" at the Artillery Ground. The match was played for fifty guineas a team and was the result of a challenge by the Addington players to meet any other five in England. Betting was 8–1 in favour of Addington but the team of Faulkner, Joe Harris, John Harris, George Jackson and Durling was beaten by Colchin, John Bryant, Robert Eures, John Bell and Thomas Waymark. On 17 July, in a return match, the same Addington five beat the same England five for fifty guineas. But on 26 July in a deciding match, England won by 2 runs, scoring 11 and 12; Addington replied with 16 and 5. The prize this time was 100 guineas. England made two changes to its team with James Bryant and Val Romney replacing Bell and Waymark. Addington's five were unchanged.

On 17 July 1750, Addington lost a sensational match to the re-emerging Dartford by 6 runs on Dartford Brent. Dartford scored 46 and 34; Addington replied with 39 and 35. William Hodsoll and the two Bryants all played for Dartford as given men. According to the London Evening Post on Thursday 19 July, Dartford lost its last five second innings wickets in five successive deliveries by a mixture of caught and bowled, but still won.

There are more Addington games in the records until the end of the 1752 season but then there is nothing more, apart from occasional mentions of Faulkner and Durling who played into the 1760s. The Addington cricket ground still exists, is still in use for local games and is held to be one of the oldest in England.
