= Tom Faulkner =

English cricketer and prizefighter (c.1719–1785)

Thomas Faulkner (c.1719–1785), known as 'Long Tom', was an English cricketer and prizefighter. Surrey man, he was a prominent single wicket player who is recorded playing in challenge matches at the Artillery Ground. He played regularly for the prestigious Addington Cricket Club in Surrey and appears in the records from 1744 until 1761. He often played in single wicket matches against Stephen Dingate.

== Cricket career ==
Faulkner's first recorded appearance was on 2 June 1744 when he played in an eleven-a-side match for London against a combined Surrey and Sussex team at the Artillery Ground. Surrey and Sussex won by 55 runs and the match is now famous for the world's oldest known match scorecard, which lists individual scores but no details of dismissals. London, whose team included given men, was the host club and their opponents were all from the counties of Surrey and Sussex. The visitors batted first and scored 102. London replied with 79 and Faulkner, who was number 6 in the batting order, was out for 1. Surrey and Sussex had a first innings lead of 23. In their second innings, Surrey and Sussex reached 102/6 and then apparently declared their innings closed, although the Laws of Cricket did not allow for declarations in 1744. In the final innings, London needed 126 to win but were all out for 70. Faulkner was dismissed without scoring. The scorecard was kept by the 2nd Duke of Richmond at Goodwood House.

== Prizefighting ==
As a prizefighter, Faulkner's first recorded bout was at Long Fields, Bloomsbury, roughly the site of modern Russell Square, on 16 February 1757, against a Frenchman, Monsieur Petit. Faulkner won after ten rounds and 39 minutes. One of his last fights was against the Irishman Rossemus Gregory on 28 April 1777, which Faulkner won after twenty rounds and a gruelling 116 minutes. He was known to have had a broken nose.

== Retirement and death ==
Faulkner retired to manage the Welsh Harp public house at 28, Aylesbury Street, St James Clerkenwell. He died on 14 March 1785, at a stated age of 66 years, and was buried in St James' churchyard.

== Sources ==
- ACS (1981). A Guide to Important Cricket Matches Played in the British Isles 1709–1863. Nottingham: ACS.
- McCann, Tim (2004). Sussex Cricket in the Eighteenth Century. Lewes: Sussex Record Society. ISBN 978-08-54450-55-8.
