= Ian Maun =

Ian Maun (born 2 January 1949) is a retired university lecturer who has written two chronological researches of 18th century cricket matches and events. He attended the Royal Grammar School, High Wycombe, from 1960 to 1967, and read modern languages at Pembroke College, Cambridge. Maun was a senior lecturer at the University of Exeter from 1999 until 2009, teaching French and German. His published cricket works are From Commons to Lord's, Volumes One and Two which cover the years 1700 to 1750 and 1751 to 1770 respectively; his intention is to ultimately publish researches of the whole 18th century. Maun's books have been generally well-received and he was voted "Cricket Statistician of the Year" by the Association of Cricket Statisticians and Historians (the ACS) in 2009, following the publication of his first volume.

Maun's work is an invaluable aid to cricket historians as he has presented newspaper and other published references to 18th century cricket in verbatim form. He has largely followed the style of G. B. Buckley but, given access to electronic versions of 18th century sources, he has been able to discover many match references that eluded Buckley and other early researchers who did not have virtual access. For example, Buckley in the 1930s discovered in the St James Evening Post a notice of the London v Dartford match on Thursday, 18 June 1724, which is notable as the earliest known match on Kennington Common. What remained unknown until Maun's researches was that the match was actually a return to one played at Dartford Brent a week earlier.

== Bibliography ==
- Buckley, G. B. (1935). Fresh Light on 18th Century Cricket. Cotterell.
- Maun, Ian (2009). From Commons to Lord's, Volume One: 1700 to 1750. Roger Heavens. ISBN 978-1-900592-52-9.
- Maun, Ian (2011). From Commons to Lord's, Volume Two: 1751 to 1770. Martin Wilson. ISBN 978-0-9569066-0-1.
