= 1740 English cricket season =

Cricket season review

The 1740 English cricket season was beset by rain, especially in July. The season is notable in one way for the earliest known mention of the famous Newland brothers. London Cricket Club feature in all the surviving match reports, including two against Kent. Details of eight historically important matches are known. (Note: Any match listed in the ACS' Important Match Guide (1981) is historically important, and therefore of the highest standard, whether or not a scorecard might exist. The same applies to numerous matches discovered by researchers since 1981. For further information, see First-class cricket.)

== Kent v London ==
Kent and London arranged matches for 28 July and 4 August, but they fell foul of the bad weather that summer. The first match on Sevenoaks Vine ended in a draw, after "rain halted play for some time". Kent, batting first, scored 71, to which London replied with 98. Kent made 130 in their second innings, setting London a target of 104 to win. They had made 30/3 when time ran out. The newspaper report mentioned the return match to be played on the Artillery Ground, but no result has been found.

== Chislehurst v London ==
As in previous seasons, London arranged matches against Chislehurst. The first, played 27 June on Chislehurst Common was won by London. The return match, scheduled for 2 July on the Artillery Ground, is result unknown. A pre-match announcement for the second match said: "All persons are desir'd to come in by the Iron Gates at the Pyed Horse-yard". The Pyed Horse was a pub adjoining the ground, and its landlord (George Smith at the time) was usually the groundkeeper.

== London v Moulsey & Richmond ==
London also played two matches against the combined Moulsey & Richmond team. The first was 8 July on Moulsey Hurst, but "rain delayed the start till between three and four o’clock". In the limited time available, London batted first and scored 100. Moulsey & Richmond made 86. Batting again, London had reached 70/8 when time ran out, so the result was a draw. It was decided to try again the next week on the Artillery Ground. In the return, London won by 73 runs.

== London v Berkshire, Buckinghamshire & Hertfordshire ==
On 8 September, London met a combined Berkshire, Buckinghamshire & Hertfordshire team at the New Ground, Uxbridge Moor. London won "with great difficulty". The report in the London Evening Post mentions arrangements for a return fixture at the Artillery Ground on 15 September. This is the earliest mention of Uxbridge Moor as a venue, and the first time that Berkshire and Buckinghamshire are mentioned in terms of county cricket, albeit parts of a combined team here. The first mention of Hertfordshire as a team was in 1732, albeit in combination with Essex. There are no reports of the return match having been played.

== Other events ==
Thomas Waymark, who had been employed by the 2nd Duke of Richmond as a groom, relocated to Bray, Berkshire, where he was employed by cricket enthusiast Mr Darville. Waymark took part in matches organised by Darville.

In a letter from Goodwood House, dated Wednesday, 30 July, to his friend Thomas Pelham-Holles, 1st Duke of Newcastle, the 2nd Duke of Richmond mentioned several local people including "John Newland, that you must remember". This is the first mention in the sources of the Newland brothers who became famous as members of Slindon Cricket Club.

== First mentions ==
=== Clubs and teams ===
- Berkshire, Buckinghamshire & Hertfordshire (combined)
- Moulsey & Richmond (combined)
- Slindon Cricket Club

=== Venues ===
- New Ground, Uxbridge Moor

=== Players ===
name	club/county	notes
Mr Darville	Berkshire	Apparently Thomas Waymark's employer at Bray Mills in Berkshire. A patron who is recorded playing in three single wicket matches in 1748.
John Newland	Slindon	Brother of Richard Newland. First mentioned in correspondence to Thomas Pelham-Holles, 1st Duke of Newcastle by the 2nd Duke of Richmond as someone "that you must remember".
George Smith	London	A publican who was also the groundskeeper of the Artillery Ground. Although he was an occasional player in matches, he was better known for his financial problems, and his battles against bankruptcy.

== Bibliography ==
- ACS (1981). A Guide to Important Cricket Matches Played in the British Isles 1709–1863. Nottingham: ACS. OCLC 85045528.
- Buckley, G. B. (1935). Fresh Light on 18th Century Cricket. Birmingham: Cotterell & Co. OCLC 23450280.
- Maun, Ian (2009). From Commons to Lord's, Volume One: 1700 to 1750. Cambridge: Roger Heavens. ISBN 978-19-00592-52-9.
- McCann, Tim (2004). Sussex Cricket in the Eighteenth Century (PDF). Vol. 88. Lewes: West Sussex Record Office. ISBN 978-08-54450-55-8.
