= Cockfighting =

Blood sport between domesticated roosters

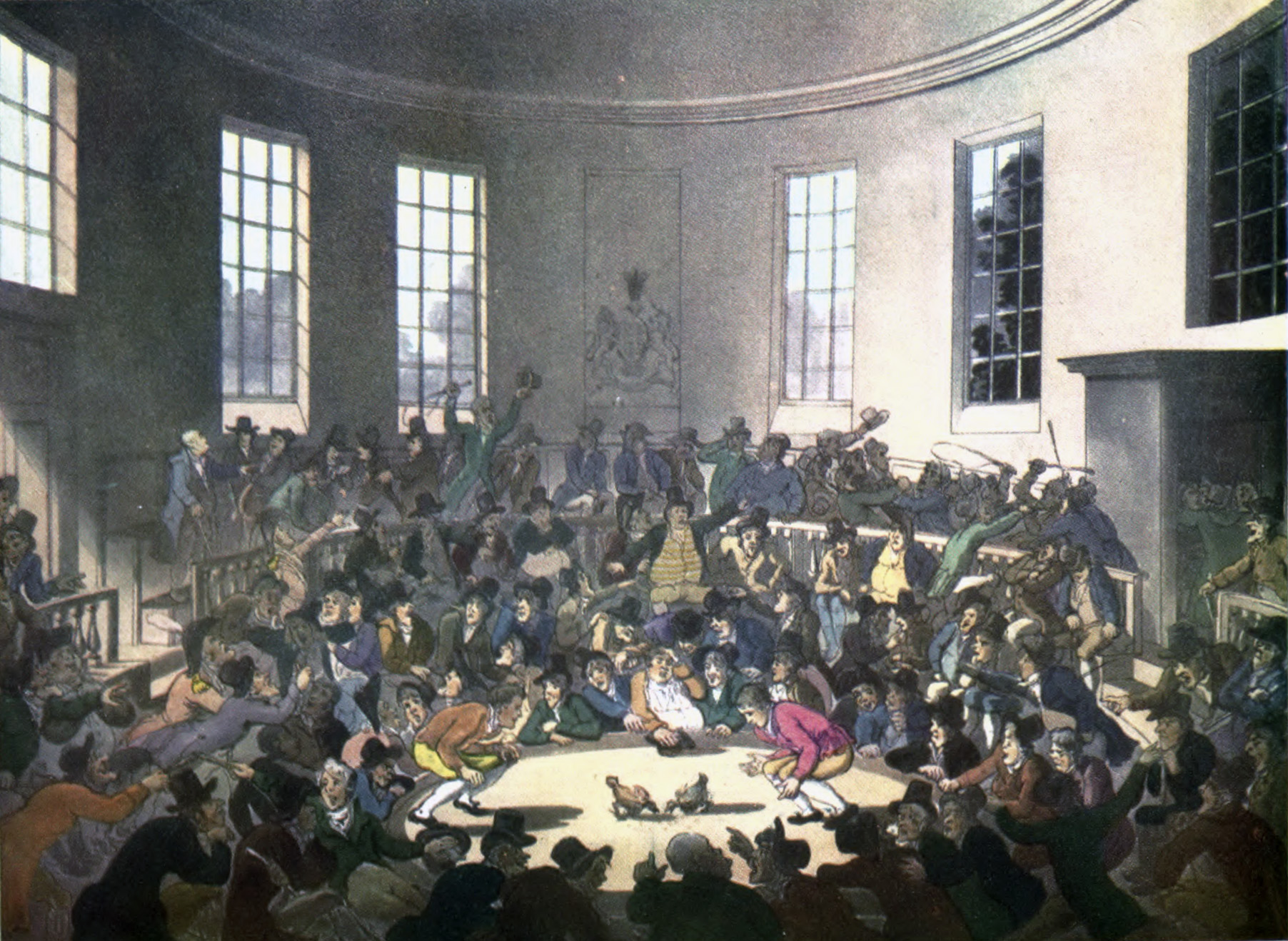
Cockfight in London, c. 1808

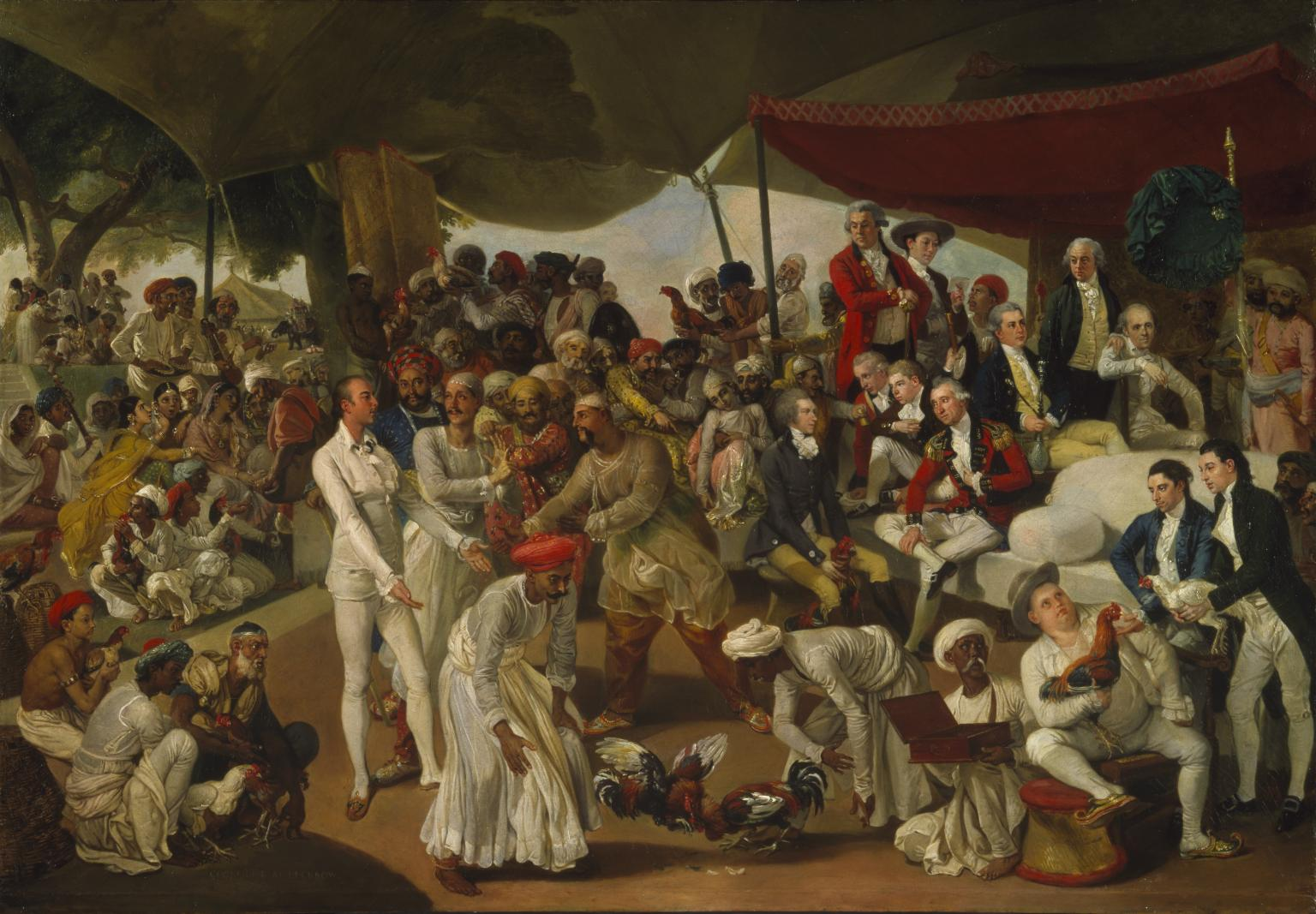
Colonel Mordaunt's cockfight in Lucknow, 1784–1786, by Johann Zoffany

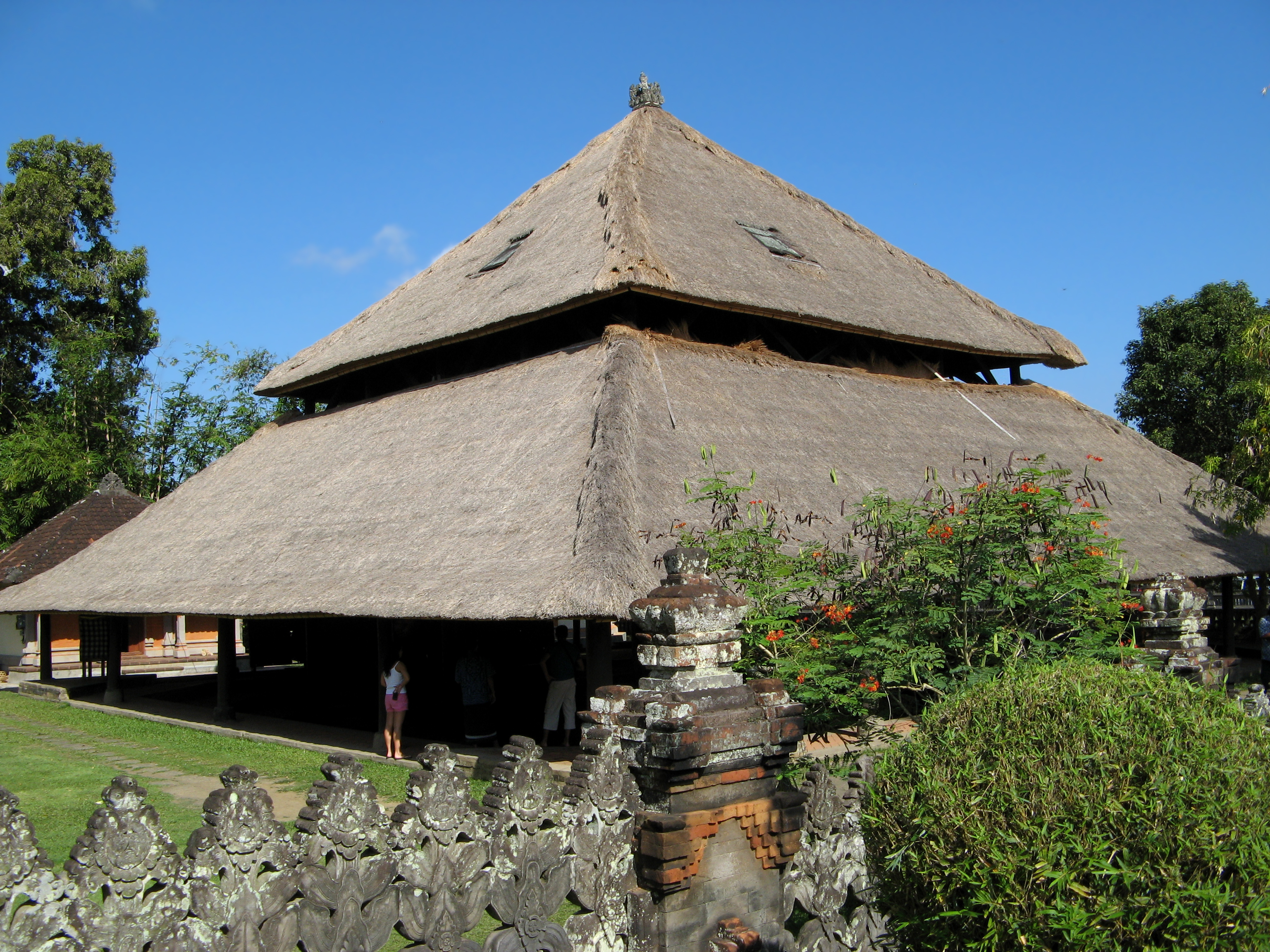
The wantilan, a Balinese pavilion that can be used for cockfighting

Cockfighting is a blood sport involving domesticated roosters as the combatants. The first documented use of the word gamecock, denoting use of the cock as to a "game", a sport, pastime or entertainment, was recorded in 1634, after the term "cock of the game" used by George Wilson, in the earliest known book on the sport of cockfighting, The Commendation of Cocks and Cock Fighting, in 1607. But it was during Ferdinand Magellan's voyage of discovery of the Philippines in 1521 when modern cockfighting was first witnessed and documented for Westerners by the Italian Antonio Pigafetta, Magellan's chronicler, in the Kingdom of Taytay.

The gamecocks (not to be confused with game birds) are specially bred and conditioned for increased stamina and strength. Male and female chickens of such a breed are referred to as gamefowl. Cocks are also bred to be aggressive towards other males of their species. Wagers are often made on the outcome of the match, held in a ring called a cockpit.

Cockfighting is a blood sport due in some part to the physical trauma the cocks inflict on each other, which is sometimes increased by attaching metal spurs to the cocks' natural spurs. While not all fights are to the death, the cocks may endure significant physical trauma. In some areas around the world, cockfighting is still practiced as a mainstream event; in some countries it is regulated by law, or forbidden outright.

== Process ==
Two owners place their gamecock in the cockpit. The cocks fight until one of them dies or is critically injured. Historically, this was in a cockpit, a term which was also used in the 16th century to mean a place of entertainment or frenzied activity. William Shakespeare used the term in Henry V to specifically mean the area around the stage of a theatre. In Tudor times, the Palace of Westminster had a permanent cockpit, called the Cockpit-in-Court.

== History ==
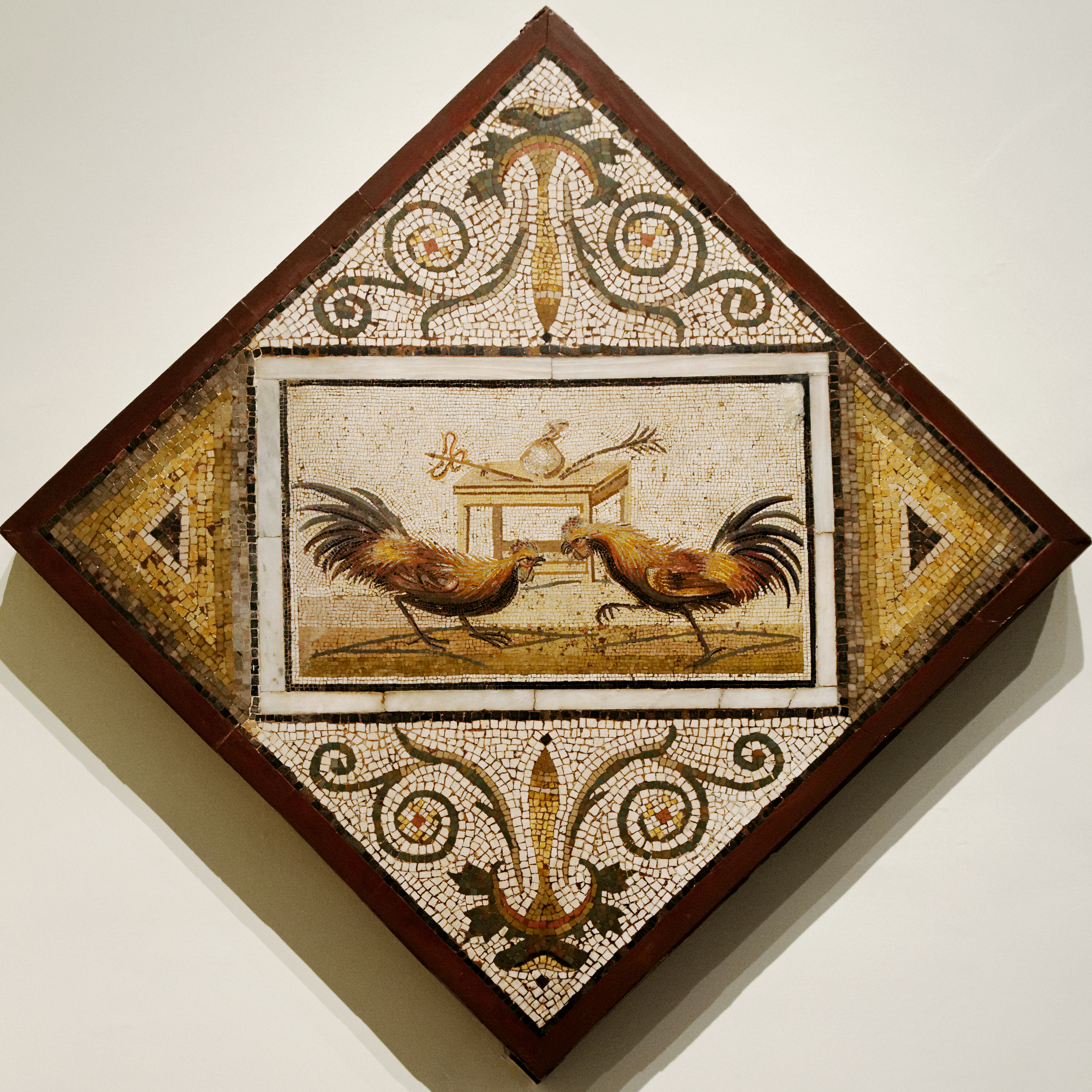
In this ancient Roman mosaic, two cocks face off in front of a table displaying the purse for the winner between a caduceus and a palm of victory (National Archaeological Museum of Naples)

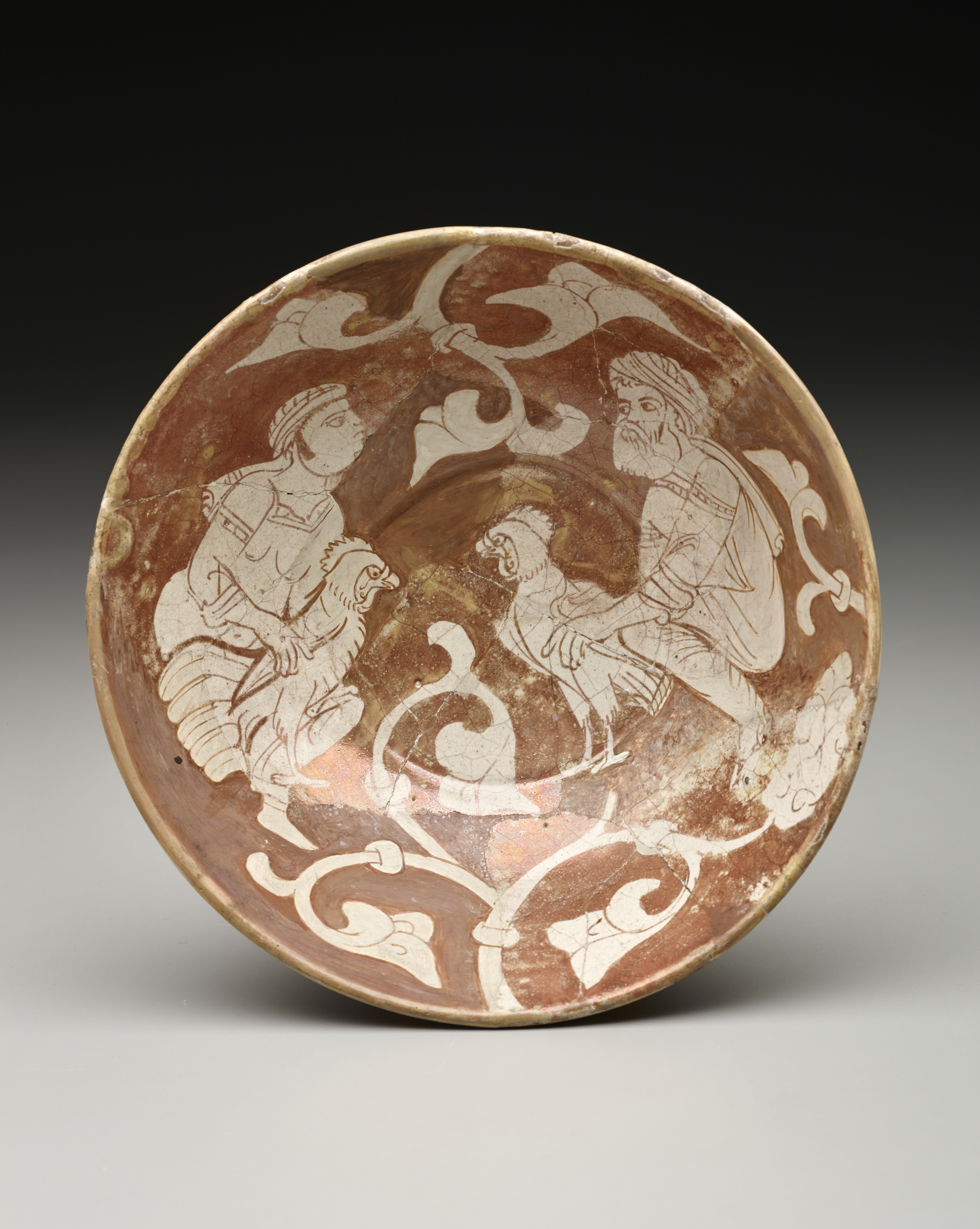
Fatimid Luster Plate with Cock Fight. Cairo, 11th–12th century. Keir Collection of Islamic Art

Cockfighting is an ancient spectator sport. There is evidence that cockfighting was a pastime in the Indus Valley civilization. The Encyclopedia Britannica (2008) holds:

The sport was popular in ancient times in India, China, Persia, and other Eastern countries and was introduced into Ancient Greece in the time of Themistocles (c. 524–460 BC). For a long time the Romans affected to despise this "Greek diversion", but they ended up adopting it so enthusiastically that the agricultural writer Columella (1st century AD) complained that its devotees often spent their whole patrimony in betting at the side of the pit.

Based on his analysis of a Mohenjo-daro seal, Iravatham Mahadevan speculates that the city's ancient name could have been Kukkutarma ("the city [-rma] of the cockerel [kukkuta]"). However, according to a recent study, "it is not known whether these birds made much contribution to the modern domestic fowl. Chickens from the Harappan culture of the Indus Valley (2500–2100 BC) may have been the main source of diffusion throughout the world." Also, "Within the Indus Valley, indications are that chickens were used for sport and not for food (Zeuner 1963)", and by 1000 BC they had assumed "religious significance".

In China, the first recorded cockfight took place in 517 BC.

Some additional insight into the pre-history of European and American secular cockfighting may be taken from The London Encyclopaedia:

At first cockfighting was partly a religious and partly a political institution at Athens; and was continued for improving the seeds of valor in the minds of their youth, but was afterwards perverted both there and in the other parts of Greece to a common pastime, without any political or religious intention.

An early image of a fighting rooster has been found on a 6th-century BC seal of Jaazaniah from the biblical city of Mizpah in Benjamin, near Jerusalem. Remains of these birds have been found at other Israelite Iron Age sites, when the rooster was used as a fighting bird; they are also pictured on other seals from the period as a symbol of ferocity, such as the late-7th-century BC red jasper seal inscribed "Jehoahaz, son of the king", which likely belonged to Jehoahaz of Judah "while he was still a prince during his father's life".

The anthropologist Clifford Geertz wrote the influential essay Deep Play: Notes on the Balinese Cockfight, on the meaning of the cockfight in Balinese culture.

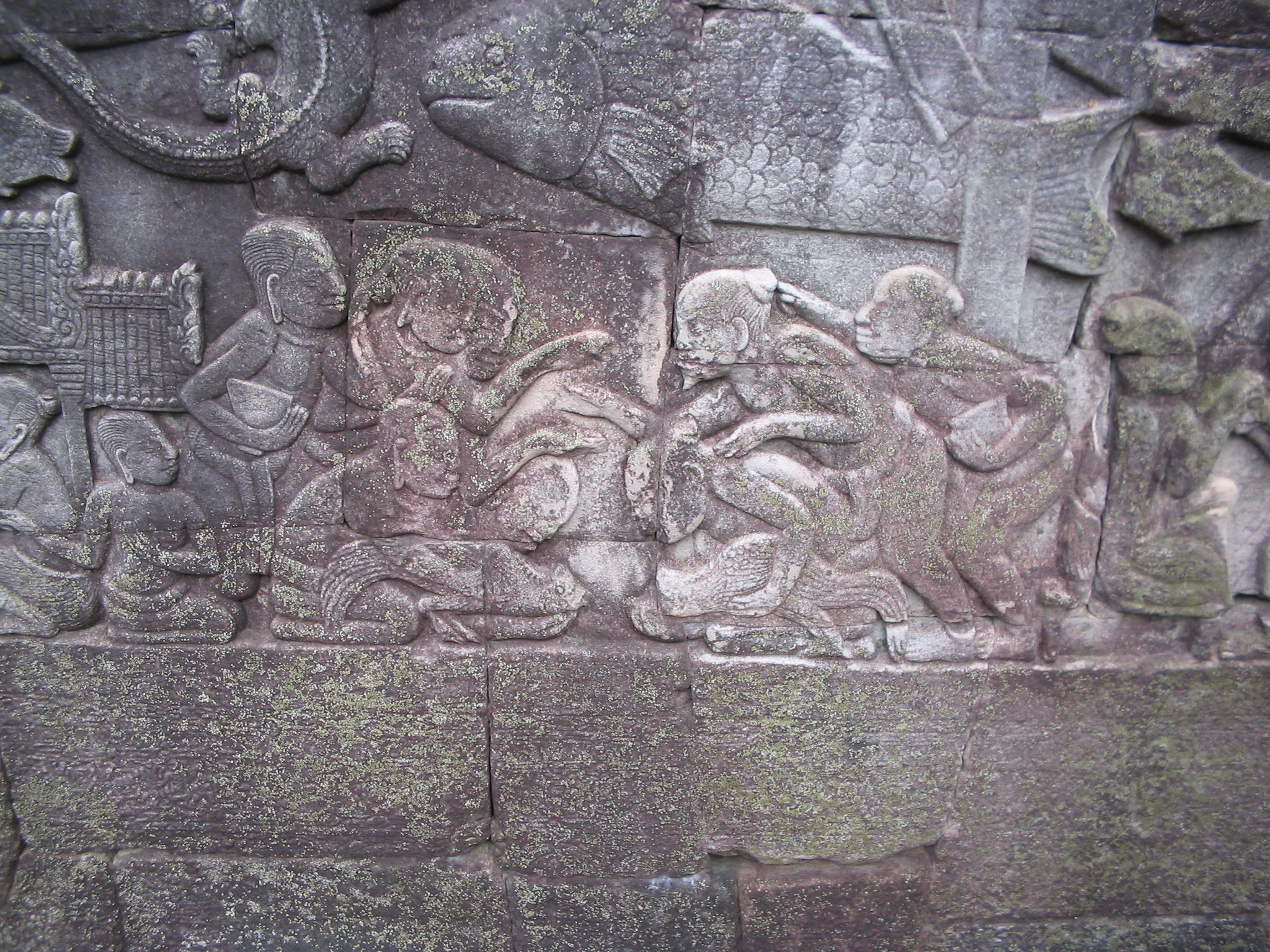
Bas relief of cockfighting from the Khmer Empire, 12th/13th century

== Regional variations ==
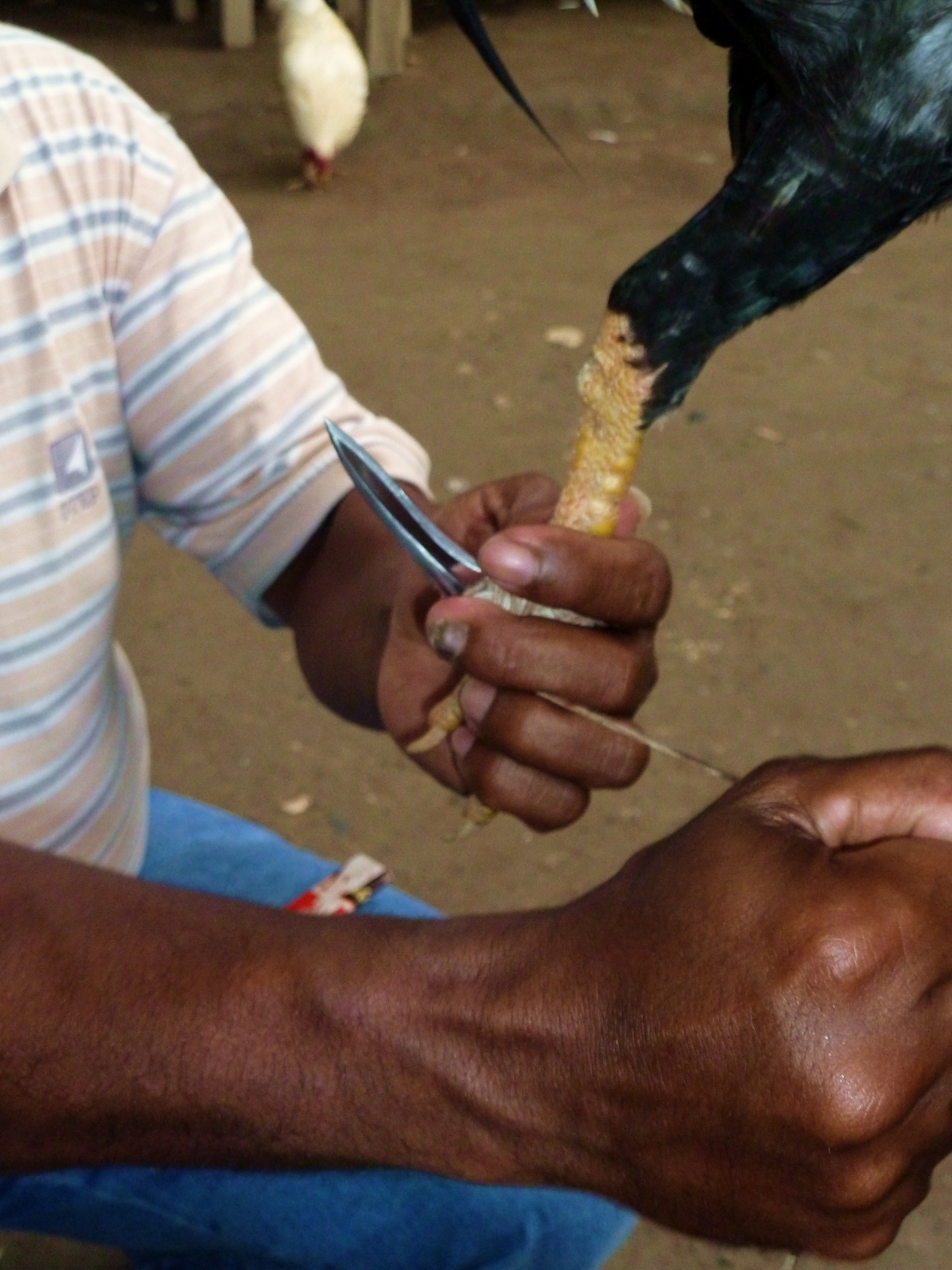
Spurs taped and tied onto legs in Timor-Leste

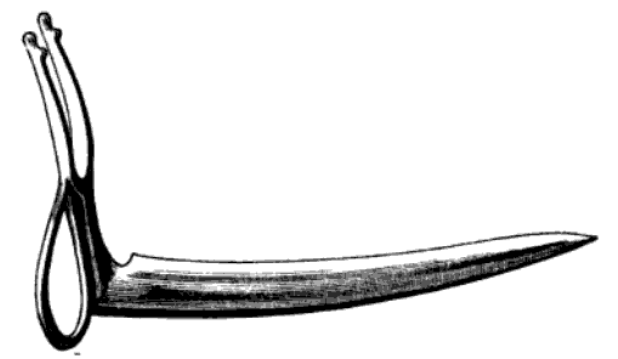
A single-edged spur (tari) used in Philippine cockfighting (c.1879)

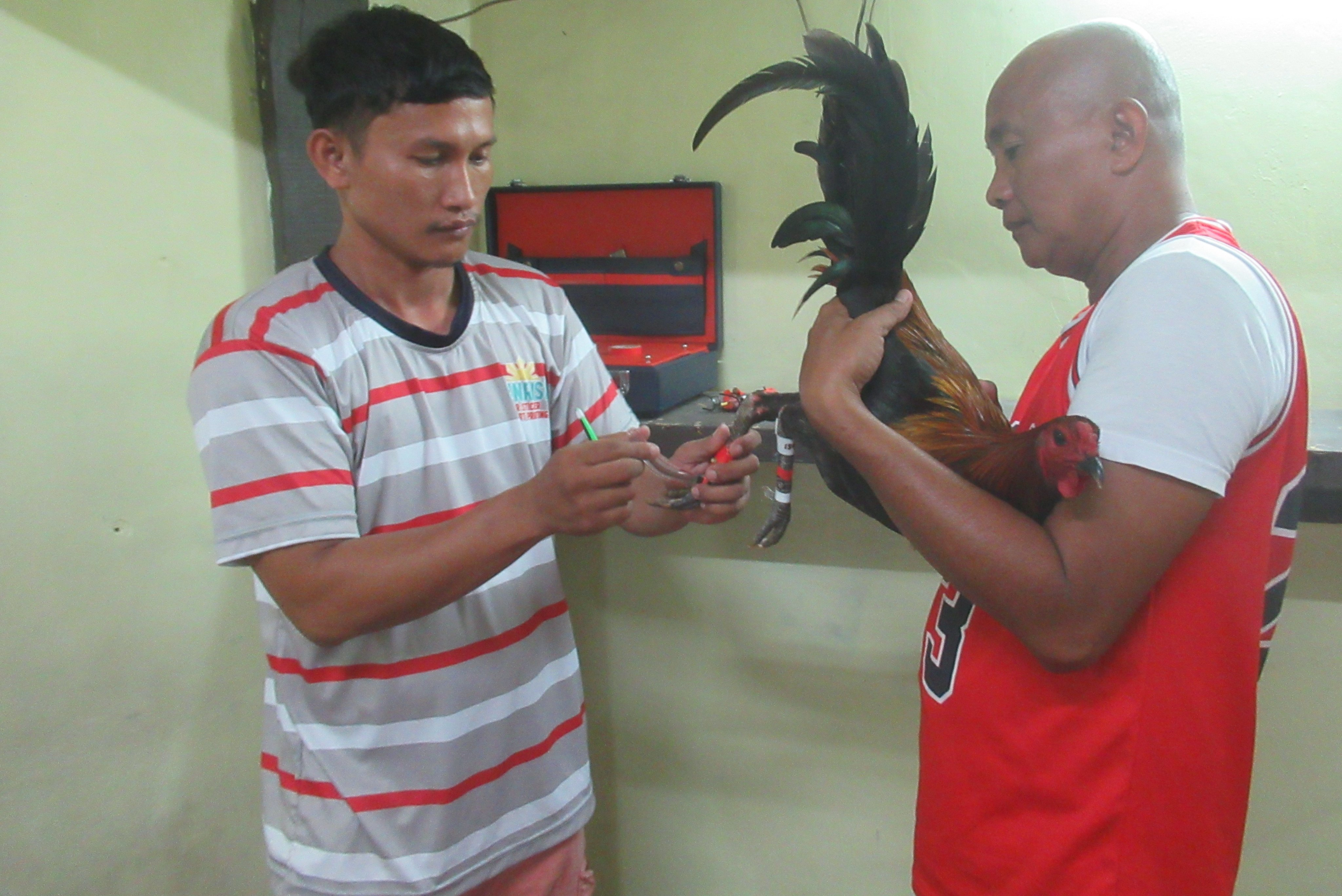
Single-edged blade (spurs) taped-tied onto left leg (by gaffer ("Taga Tari") with handler ("taga-bitaw")

In some regional variations, the birds are equipped with either metal spurs (called gaffs) or knives, tied to the leg in the area where the bird's natural spur has been partially removed. A cockspur is a bracelet (often made of leather) with a curved, sharp spike which is attached to the leg of the bird. The spikes typically range in length from "short spurs" of just over an inch to "long spurs" almost two and a half inches long. In the highest levels of 17th century English cockfighting, the spikes were made of silver. The sharp spurs have been known to injure or even kill the bird handlers. In the naked heel variation, the bird's natural spurs are left intact and sharpened: fighting is done without gaffs or taping, particularly in India (especially in Tamil Nadu). There it is mostly fought naked heel and either three rounds of twenty minutes with a gap of twenty minutes or four rounds of fifteen minutes each and a gap of fifteen minutes between them.

Cockfighting is common throughout Southeast Asia, where it is implicated in spreading bird flu. Cockfighting is a popular form of fertility worship in Southeast Asia.

=== India ===
The sport of cockfighting has long been outlawed in India, with the Supreme Court proclaiming the practice to be in direct violation of the Prevention of Cruelty to Animals Act 1960. According to M Ravindranath Babu Superintendent, Indian Police, it is also considered a hijack of traditional festivals to promote illegal betting and gambling. Despite this, institutional resistance to government bans on cockfighting occurs. At India's 'Sun God' festival in 2012, the local Bharatiya Janata Party district committee campaigned for the right to have cock-fights. This was then agreed by local police if it took place inside the temples.

Cockfights are currently common in the southern Indian states of Telangana, Andhra Pradesh, Tamil Nadu and Karnataka and in Tulu Nādu it is a tradition after any ritual to conduct cockfight despite a countrywide ban imposed in 1960. It is a regional spectacle primarily taking place in January, coinciding with harvest festival celebrations. Like Jallikattu, Cock fighting (Seval Sandai) an ancient spectator sport is mentioned in Sangam literature Paṭṭiṉappālai and Tirumurukāṟṟuppaṭai.

=== Indonesia ===
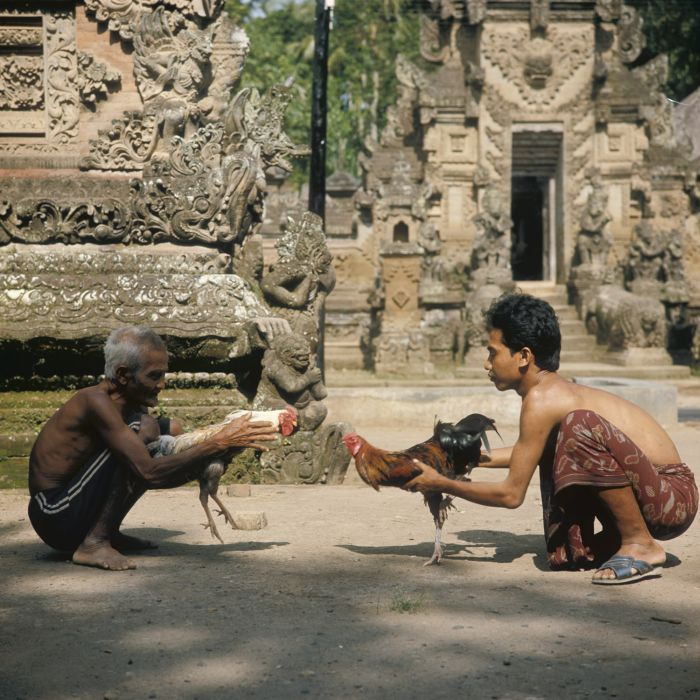
Confronting two cocks for tabuh rah ritual tajen (fighting) in Bali, Indonesia, 1971

Cockfighting is a very old tradition in Balinese Hinduism, the Batur Bang Inscriptions I (from the year 933) and the Batuan Inscription (dated 944 on the Balinese Caka calendar) disclose that the tabuh rah ritual has existed for centuries.

In Bali, cockfights, known as tajen or Sabung ayam, are practiced in an ancient religious purification ritual to expel evil spirits. This ritual, a form of animal sacrifice, is called tabuh rah ("pouring blood"). The purpose of tabuh rah is to provide an offering (the blood of the losing chicken) to the evil spirits. Cockfighting is a religious obligation at every Balinese temple festival or religious ceremony. Cockfights without a religious purpose are considered gambling in Indonesia, although it is still largely practiced in many parts of Indonesia. Women are generally not involved in the tabuh rah process. The tabuh rah process is held on the largest pavilion in a Balinese temple complex, the wantilan.

The American anthropologist Clifford Geertz published his most famous work, Notes on the Balinese Cockfight, on the practice of cockfights in Bali. In it, he argued that the cockfight served as a pastiche or model of wider Balinese society from which judgments about other aspects of the culture could be drawn.

=== Philippines ===
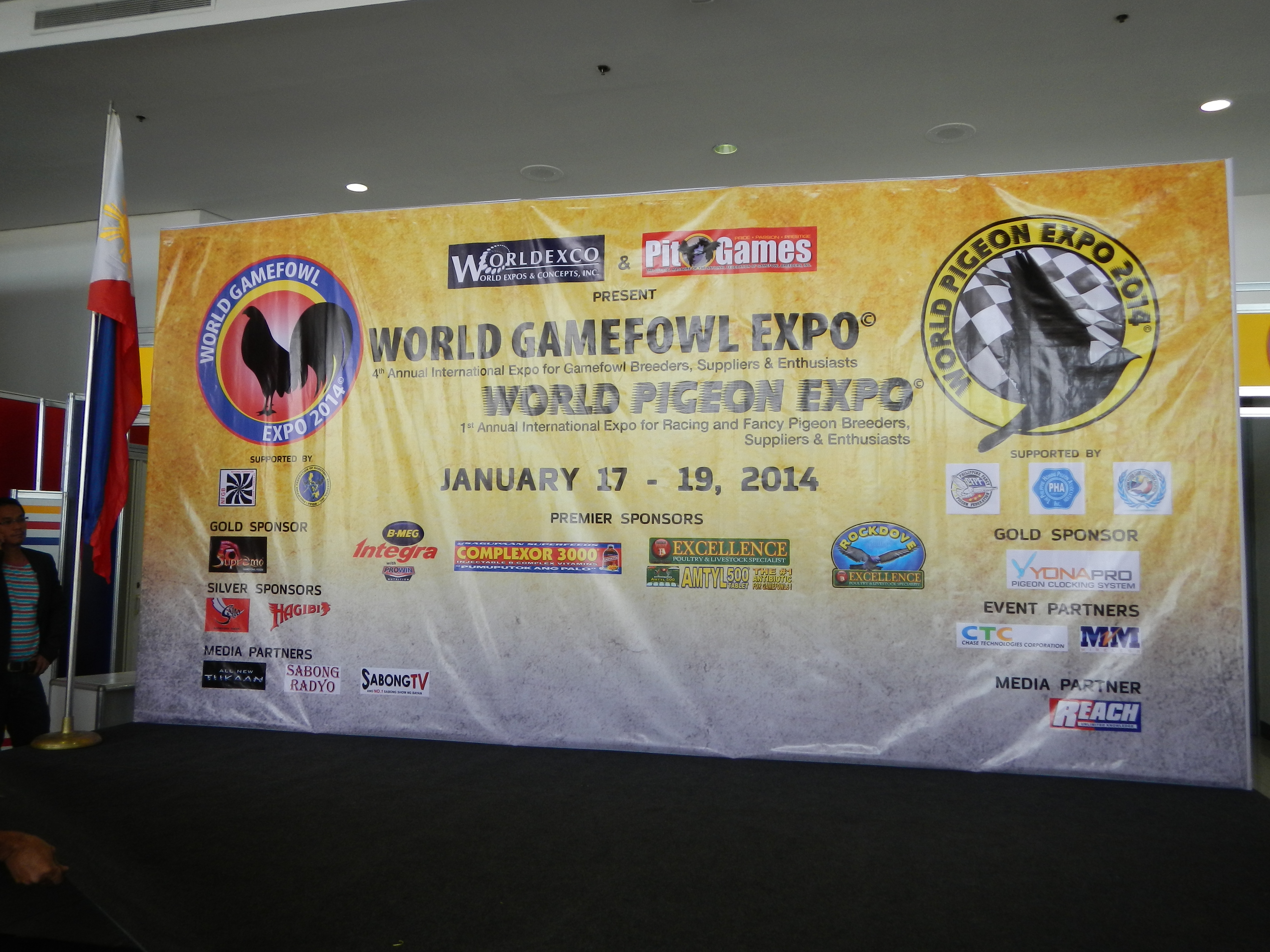
World Gamefowl Expo 2014, World Trade Center Metro Manila

Cockfighting was already flourishing in pre-colonial Philippines, as recorded by Antonio Pigafetta, the Italian diarist aboard Ferdinand Magellan's 1521 expedition.

Cockfighting, locally termed sabong, remains a popular pastime in the Philippines, where both illegal and legal cockfights occur. Legal cockfights are held in cockpits every week, while illegal ones, called tupada or tigbakay, are held in secluded cockpits where authorities cannot raid them. In both types, knives or gaffs are used. There are two kinds of knives used in Philippine cockfighting: single-edged blades (used in derbies) and double-edged blades; the lengths of knives also vary. All knives are attached to the left leg of the bird, but depending on the agreement between owners, blades can be attached to the right leg or even to both legs. Sabong and illegal tupada are judged by a referee called sentensyador or koyme, whose verdict is final and not subject to appeal. Bets are usually taken by the kristo, so named because of his outstretched hands when calling out wagers from the audience from memory.

The World Slasher Cup is an international cockfighting derby held biannually at the Araneta Coliseum in Quezon City. It was established in 1990 as an international tournament, but its origins date back as early as the 1960s. (Note: There are conflicting reports on when the tournament began. The website claims it was in 1963. Other reports suggest it was in 1962 or 1968.)

== Other bird species ==
Male saffron finches and canaries have been used in fights on occasion.

== Legal status ==
Cockfighting laws around the world: Nationwide ban on cockfighting Nationwide ban on cockfighting, but some designated local traditions exempted Some subnational bans on cockfighting Cockfighting legal see section Legal Status, otherwise no data

=== Argentina ===
Article 3.8 of Law 14.346 on the Ill-Treatment and Acts of Cruelty to Animals of 1954 explicitly prohibits 'carrying out public or private acts of animal fights, fights of bulls and heifers, or parodies [thereof], in which animals are killed, wounded or harassed.'

=== Australia ===
Cockfighting, and the possession of cockfighting equipment, is illegal in Australia and punishable with prison time.

=== Belgium ===
In Belgium, cockfights have been prohibited since 1867. In 1929 all organised fights between animals were banned. In 1986 and 1991, the animal welfare act was amended by also criminalising attendance of cockfights. Offenders risk six months imprisonment and a fine of 2,000 euros. Since the 1990s, several people have been prosecuted for cockfighting.

=== Brazil ===
Cockfighting (rinha de galos) was banned in 1934 with the help of President Getúlio Vargas through Brazil's 1934 constitution, passed on 16 July. Based on the recognition of animal rights in the Constitution, a Brazilian Supreme Court ruling resulted in the ban of animal related activities that involve claimed "animal suffering such as cockfighting, and a tradition practiced in southern Brazil, known as 'Farra do Boi' (the Oxen Festival)", stating that "animals also have the right to legal protection against mistreatment and suffering".

=== Bulgaria ===
Cockfighting is illegal in Bulgaria under the country's animal protection and criminal legislation, which prohibits organizing or participating in animal fights and the infliction of unnecessary suffering on animals.

=== Canada ===
Canada's Criminal Code includes animal cruelty legislation, which criminalize any kind of fighting or baiting of any animal. These laws have been amended and made more restrictive over time, and as of 2018 include bans on fighting, promoting, arranging and profiting from fights, as well as breeding, training and transporting of animals for the purpose of fights and keeping of arenas for the purpose of animal fights, for animals of any kind.

=== Chile ===
Chilean Law no. 20.380 on Animal Protection of 25 August 2009 explicitly exempts various forms of 'animal sports' in Article 16: 'The norms of this law will not apply to sports in which animals participate, such as rodeo, cowfights, movement to the rein and equestrian sports, which will be governed by their respective regulations.' Although Law 20.380 does not explicitly prohibit cockfighting or other animal fighting, its performance constitutes animal abuse since the law's enactment in 2009. This was corroborated in 2011 under Decree 785 of the Ministry of Justice, which states that "...with the enactment of Law 20,380, published on October 3, 2009, on animal protection, cockfights or cockfights are absolutely prohibited, since they clearly constitute animal abuse".

=== Colombia ===
In Colombia, cockfighting is a tradition, especially in the Caribbean region and in some areas of the Andean interior. Cockfights are held during the Festival de la Leyenda Vallenata in Valledupar. In August 2010, the Constitutional Court of Colombia rejected a lawsuit that sought to prohibit bullfighting, corralejas and cockfighting with the argument that they constitute animal abuse. In March 2019, the same court confirmed such rule, under the argument that cockfighting and bullfighting are traditions with cultural roots in some municipalities of the country. The Asociación Nacional de Criadores de Gallos de Pelea organizes an international cockfighting championship.

Cockfighting was immortalized in the novel One Hundred Years of Solitude by Gabriel García Márquez, in episodes such as the events that led to the death of Prudencio Aguilar, or the fondness for it by José Arcadio Segundo. Cockfighting was one of the main subjects of La caponera, a TV adaptation of Juan Rulfo's novel, El gallo de oro, aired in Colombia and other countries in the region during the late 1990s.

=== Costa Rica ===
Cockfights have been illegal in Costa Rica since 1922. The government deems the activity as animal cruelty, public disorder and a risk for public health and is routinely repressed by the State's National Secretary for Animal Welfare. The activity is also rejected by most of the population, as 88% of Costa Ricans dislike cockfights according to recent polls of the National University. Since 2017, the activity is punishable with up to two years of prison.

=== Cuba ===
In Cuba, cockfighting is legal and popular, although gambling on matches has been banned since the 1959 Revolution. The state has opened official arenas, locally known as "galleras", including a 1,000-seat venue in Ciego de Ávila, but there are also banned underground cockfighting pits.

Cockfighting was so common following the Spanish conquest in the early 16th century that there were arenas in every urban and rural town. The first official known document about cockfighting in Cuba dates from 1737. It is a royal decree asking, to the governor of the island, a report about the inconveniences that might cause cockfights "with the people from land and sea" and asking for information about rentals of the games. The Spaniard Miguel Tacón, Lieutenant General and governor of the colony, banned cockfighting by a decree dated on October 20, 1835, limiting these spectacles only to holidays.

In 1844, a decree dictated by the Captain General of the island, Leopoldo O'Donnell, forbade non-white people to attend these shows. During the second half of the 19th century, many authorizations were conceded for building arenas, until General Juan Rius Rivera, then civilian governor in Havana, prohibited cockfighting by a decree of October 31, 1899, and later the Cuban governor, General Leonard Wood, dictated the military order no. 165 prohibiting cockfights in the whole country from June 1, 1900.

In the first half of the 20th century, legality of cockfights suffered several ups and downs.

In 1909, the then-Cuban president José Miguel Gómez, with the intention of gaining followers, allowed cockfights once again, and then regulations were agreed for the fights.

Up to the beginning of 1968, cockfights used to be held everywhere in the country, but with the purpose of stopping the bets, the arenas were closed and the fights forbidden by the authorities. In 1980, authorities legalized cockfights again and a state business organization was created with the participation of the private breeders, grouped in territories. Every year the state organization announces several national tournaments from January to April, makes trade shows and sells fighting cocks to clients from other Caribbean countries.

=== Dominican Republic ===
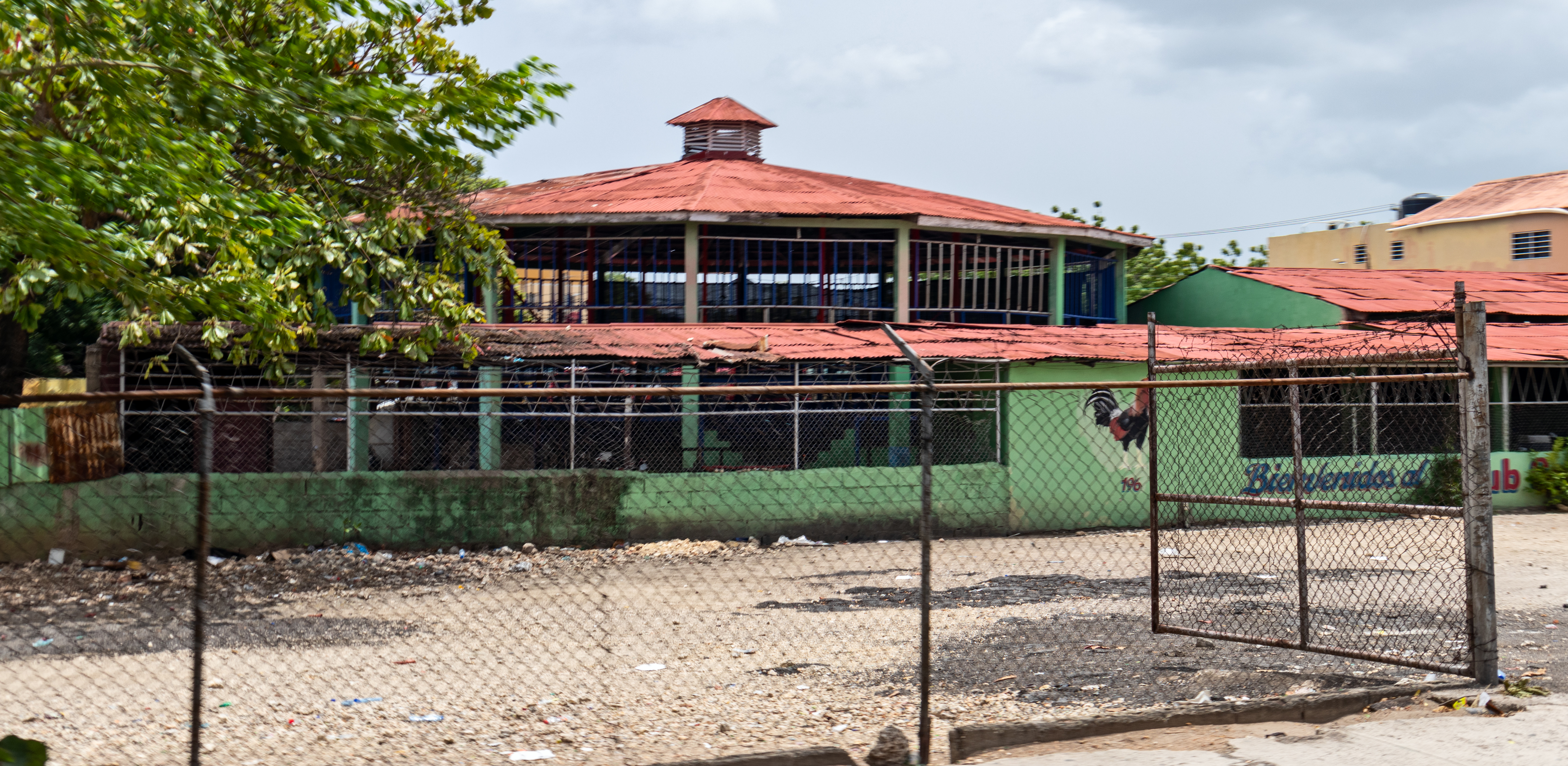
Cockfight club in La Romana, Dominican Republic, in 2022

In the Dominican Republic, cockfighting is legal, but according to Dominican Today 'increasingly rejected by society' as of December 2018. There is at least one arena (gallera) in every town, whereas in bigger cities larger coliseos can be found. Important fights are broadcast on television and newspapers have dedicated pages to cockfights and the different trabas, the local name for gamefowl breeding grounds. Those dedicated to the breeding and training of fighting cocks are called galleros or traberos. The cocks are often outfitted with special spurs made from various materials (ranging from plastic to metal or even carey shell) and fights are typically to the death.

=== East Timor ===
Cockfighting and cockfighting betting is legal on licensed venues.

=== France ===
Holding cockfights is a crime in France, but there is an exemption under subparagraph 3 of article 521–1 of the French penal code for cockfights and bullfights in locales where an uninterrupted tradition exists for them. Thus, cockfighting is allowed in the Nord-Pas de Calais region, where it takes place in a small number of towns including Raimbeaucourt, La Bistade and other villages around Lille. However, the construction of new cockfighting areas is prohibited, a law upheld by the Constitutional Council of France in 2015.

Cockfighting is also legal in some French Overseas Territories.

=== Germany ===
Cockfights have no tradition in Germany. They are illegal under increasingly stringent criminal law since 1871.

=== Haiti ===
Cockfighting is legal in Haiti. Nevins (2015) described it as 'the closest thing to a national sport in Haiti', being organised every Sunday morning in places across the country. Sharp spurs are attached to the roosters' feet to make them extra lethal, and the fight usually ends with the death of one of the animals.

=== Honduras ===
In Honduras, under Article 11 of 'Decree no. 115-2015 ─ Animal Protection and Welfare Act' that went into effect in 2016, dog and cat fights and duck races are prohibited, while 'bullfighting shows and cockfights are part of the National Folklore and as such allowed'.

=== India ===
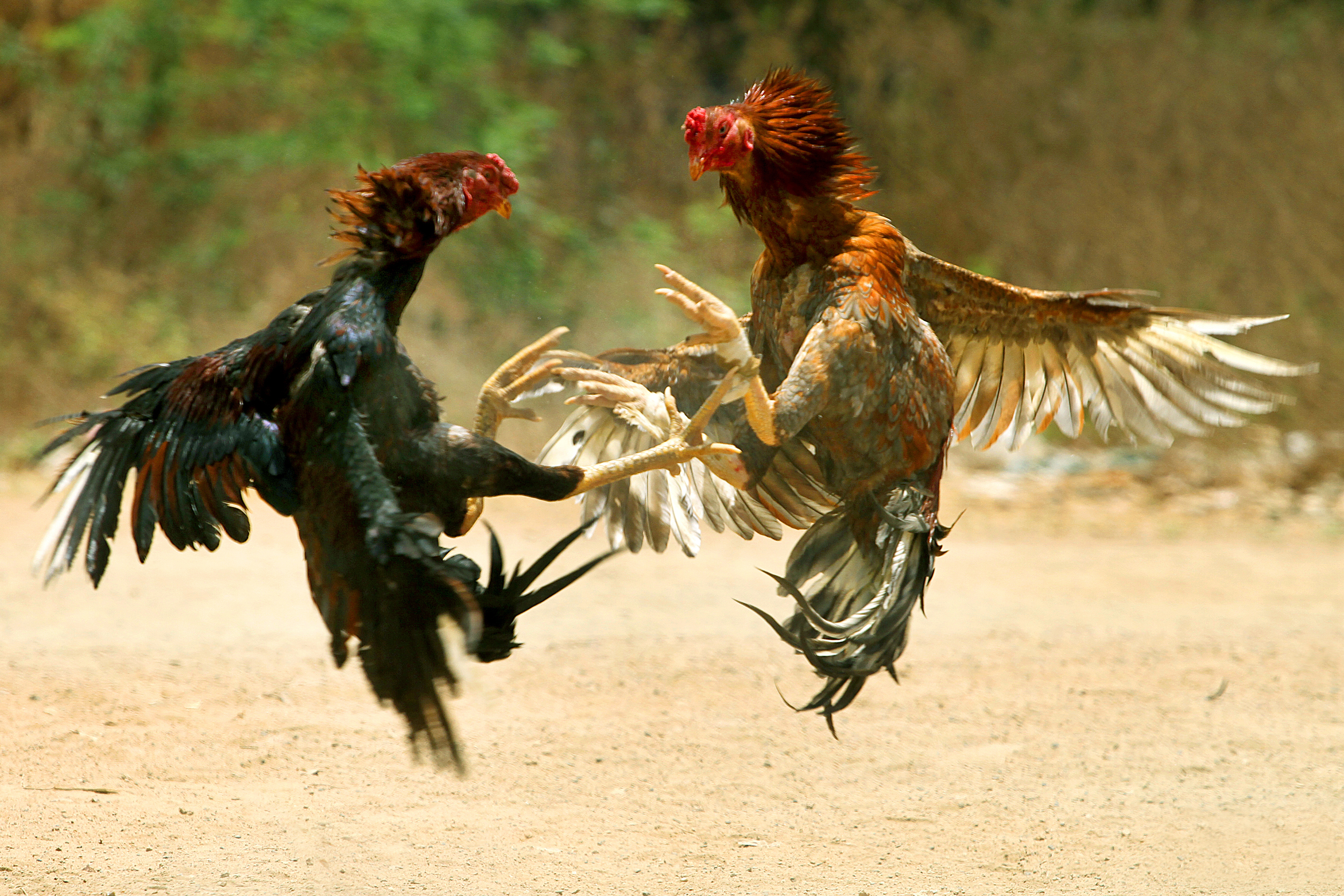
Cockfight in Tamil Nadu, India, 2011

The Supreme Court of India has banned cockfighting as a violation of the Prevention of Cruelty to Animals Act, but it remains popular, especially in the rural coast of Andhra Pradesh, with large amount of betting involved, especially around the festival of Sankranti.

=== Indonesia ===
All forms of gambling, including the gambling within secular cockfighting, were made illegal in 1981 by the Indonesian government, while the religious aspects of cockfighting within Balinese Hinduism remain protected. However, secular cockfighting remains widely popular in Bali, despite its illegal status.

=== Iraq ===
Cockfighting is illegal but widespread in Iraq. The attendees come to gamble or just for the entertainment. A rooster can cost up to $8,000, or ₹23,000.00. The most-prized birds are called Harati, which means that they are of Turkish or Indian origin, and have muscular legs and necks.

=== Japan ===
Cockfighting was introduced to Japan from China in the early 8th century and rose to popularity in the Kamakura period and the Edo period. Cockfighting endured in some Japanese regions even after being banned in 1873, during the Meiji period.

=== Malaysia ===
Only ritual cockfighting as done for Gawai celebrations in the state of Sarawak is allowed under strict regulations; licenses given however can be frozen or revoked at will by the Sarawakian government. Cockfighting venues are often raided by Sarawakian police from time to time. All other forms of animal fighting and baiting are prohibited under the Animal Welfare Act (2015).

=== Madagascar ===
Betting on cock fights is a common and legal way of gambling in Madagascar.

=== Mexico ===
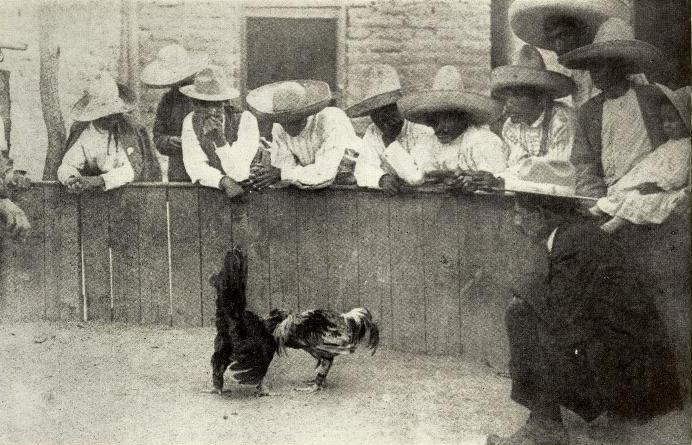
A cockfight in Mexico, c. 1913

There are cockfight bans in the country's capital, Mexico City, and in the states of Sonora and Coahuila since September 11, 2012, and in Veracruz since November 6, 2018.

Cockfighting is tolerated in the Mexican states of Michoacán, Aguascalientes, Jalisco, Nayarit, Zacatecas and Sinaloa; mostly during regional fairs and other celebrations. Cockfights are performed in palenques (pits). Cockfighting remains legal in the municipality of Ixmiquilpan and throughout Mexico.Aguascalientes Congress passed a law in 2025 to protect both bullfighting and cockfighting as 'cultural heritage' of the state.

The two parties to the bird fights are traditionally distinguished by red and green, typically by wearing a scarf or badge hanging on the belt. Cockfighting may be combined with a musical show. Fairs and regional festivals of the country's municipalities are held in venues called "palenques" of roosters. These consist of a ring made of wood whose center is full of compacted earth for the best 'performance' of the roosters. In the center, a box 4 meters per side and lines that cross from center to center each side are marked with lime. Finally, the last square, measuring 40 cm on each side, is marked in the center of the arena, where the roosters are taken the third time they are released.

=== Netherlands ===
In the Netherlands, organising or attending cockfights is illegal and punishable by up to three years imprisonment, or a fine of up to 20,500 euros.

=== New Zealand ===
The act of cockfighting is illegal under the Animal Welfare Act 1999, as is the possession, training and breeding of cocks for fighting.

=== Pakistan ===
Cockfighting was a popular sport in rural Pakistan; however, "betting is illegal under the Prevention of Gambling Act 1977". Betting is illegal, but police often turn a blind eye towards it. In Sindh, people are fond of keeping a fighting cock breed known as Sindhi Aseel. These cocks are noted for being tall, heavy and good at fighting. Another popular breed is called Mianwali Aseel. In Sindh, gamblers use almonds and other enhancing medicines to feed the fighter cocks.

=== Panama ===
Law 308 on the Protection of Animals was approved by the National Assembly of Panama on 15 March 2012. Article 7 of the law states: 'Dog fights, animal races, bullfights – whether of the Spanish or Portuguese style – the breeding, entry, permanence and operation in the national territory of all kinds of circus or circus show that uses trained animals of any species, are prohibited.' However, horse racing and cockfighting were exempt from the ban.

=== Paraguay ===
Organising fights between all animals, both in public and private, is prohibited in Paraguay under Law No. 4840 on Animal Protection and Welfare, promulgated on 28 January 2013. Specifically:

- 'The use of animals in shows, fights, popular festivals and other activities that imply cruelty or mistreatment, that can cause death, suffering or make them the object of unnatural and unworthy treatments' is prohibited (Article 30).
- 'Training domestic animals to carry out provoked fights, with the goal of holding a public or private show' is considered an 'act of mistreatment'. (Article 31)
- 'The use of animals in shows, fights, popular festivals, and other activities that imply cruelty or mistreatment, which may cause death, suffering or make them subject to unnatural or humiliating treatment' is considered a 'very serious infraction' (Article 32), which are punishable by between 501 and 1500 minimum daily wages (jornales mínimos, Article 39), and the perpetrator may be barred from 'acquiring or possessing other animals for a period that may be up to 10 years' (Article 38).

=== Peru ===
According to the Encyclopedia of Latino Culture, Peru "has probably the longest historical tradition" with cockfighting, with the practice possibly dating back to the 16th century. Cockfighting is legal and regulated by the government in Peru. Most pits (coliseos) in the country are located in Lima. Cockfighting and bullfighting are exempt from Peru's animal protection laws.

In October 2018, over 5,000 Peruvians signed a petition that called for a constitutional ban on "all cruel shows using animals" including cockfighting and bullfighting, which was accepted and taken into consideration by the Supreme Court of Peru. However, with only three of the five required judges agreeing with the petition, on 25 February 2020 the Court ruled that it could not declare the animal fighting practices unconstitutional, leaving the applicants with no further option of appeal. A week before the verdict, thousands of other people had marched through the streets of Lima in support of the animal fighting practices.

=== Philippines ===
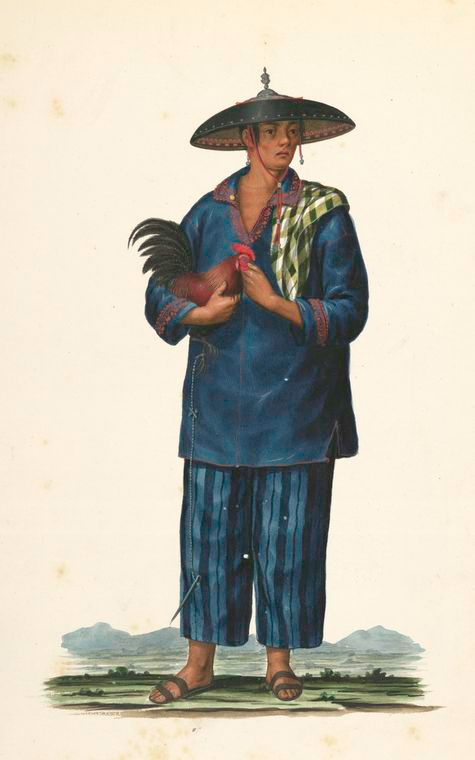
A Tagalog man with a cockfighting rooster, from Tipos del País (1841) by Justiniano Asunción

There is no nationwide ban on cockfighting in the Philippines, but since 1948, cockfighting has been prohibited every Rizal Day on December 30, with violators subject to fines or imprisonment under Republic Act No. 229. This is further supplemented by Presidential Decree No. 449, or the Anti-Cockfighting Law of 1974, which allows cockfights only on Sundays, certain holidays, and certain other occasions, and only at licensed cockpits.

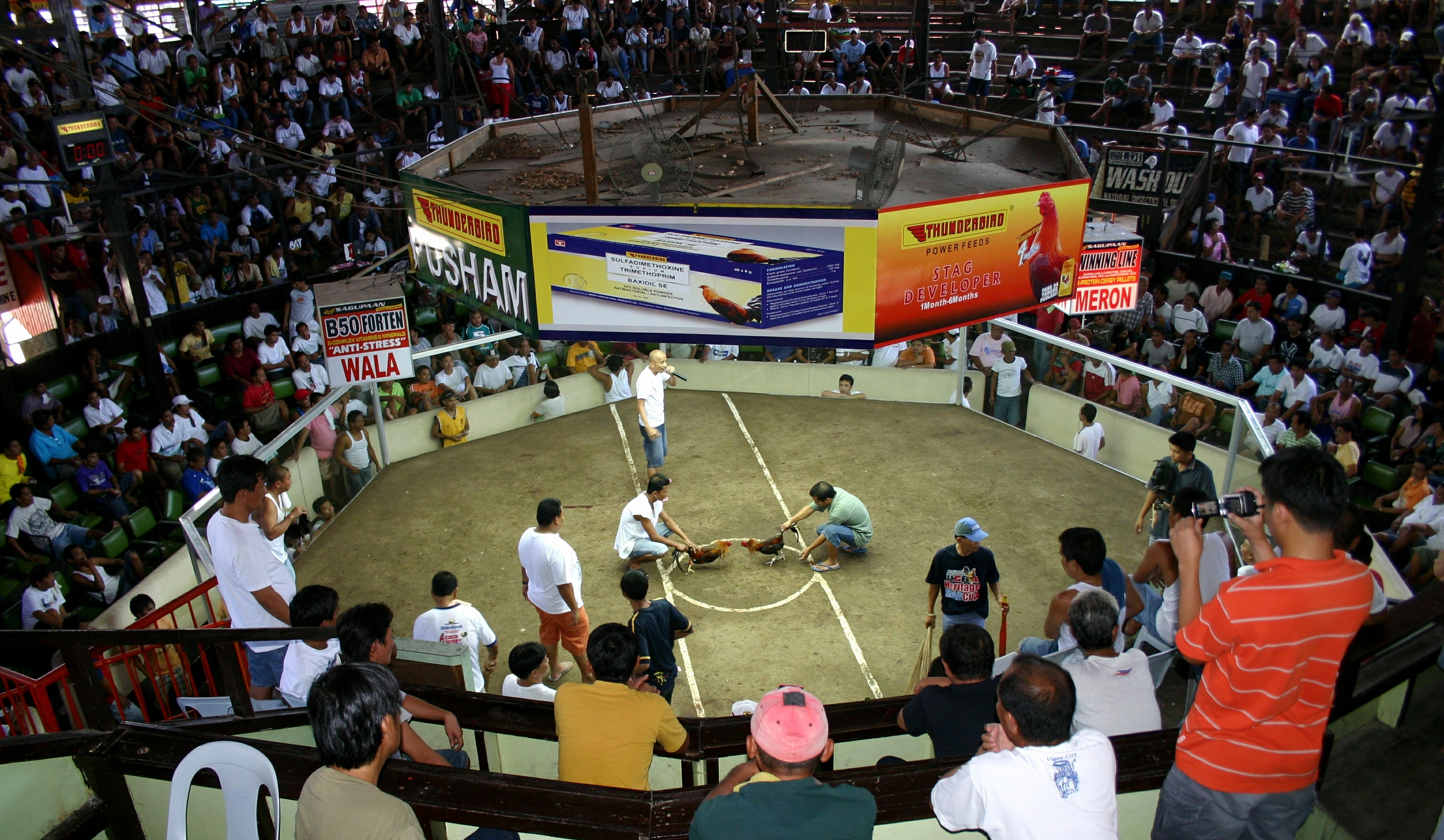
A cockfight in Davao City in 2014

The Philippines has deep cultural roots connected to cockfighting, which date back to ancient times. Filipinos brought cockfighting to Hawaii in a major wave when they first arrived, even though it was widely condemned by locals.

The popularity of cockfighting in the Philippines has extended into the digital space with the advent of online sabong, or e-sabong. This virtual iteration allows enthusiasts to participate in and bet on cockfights via internet streaming. The surge in online cockfighting has been facilitated by modern technologies, particularly through online casino platforms that host these events. The Philippines is the only country in the world that accepts online betting on cockfighting. There are reports of revenues being in the billions of dollars. Some politicians have sought to ban apps like GCash, arguing that they have played a crucial role by offering a convenient and secure method for placing bets and managing transactions online.

=== Poland ===
Cockfighting in Poland is banned. The law bans any animal cruelty in general, there are no specific laws for cockfighting. Likewise in many other European countries, this activity used to be popular up to the 18th century. In the Silesia area it used to be popular longer, even in the 19th century. It was usually held on the Day of Saint Gall (16 October). This activity was banned on most of the territory of Poland after the Partitions of Poland and before the country regained its independence in 1918. In western areas that were held by Germany, it was banned in 1871 by § 360 p. 13 of the Penal Code of the German Reich. In eastern areas that were held by Russia, it was banned in 1903 by § 287 of the Penal Code of Nikolay Stefanovich Tagantsev. After regaining independence these laws were still in power until new laws were passed. The first animal-cruelty law in independent Poland was passed in 1928 as a presidential decree and it was in power until 1997. It was added to the official Penalty Code in 1997 by § 35 points 1–2 in chapter 11. Currently, the penalty for the act is up to 3 years in prison or it might be up to 5 years if the cruelty is more drastic.

=== Romania ===
Cockfights are illegal in Romania under article 25.3 lit. c) of the Law 205/2004, with punishments ranging from 2 to 7 years imprisonment.

=== Spain ===
Cockfighting is banned in Spain except in two Spanish regions: the Canary Islands and Andalusia. In Andalusia, however, the activity has virtually disappeared, surviving only within a program to maintain the fighting breed "combatiente español" coordinated by the University of Córdoba. Spain's Animal Protection Law of 1991 recognizes an exception for these regions based on cultural heritage and a history of cockfighting in the region. Animal rights organizations have sought to ban the bloodsport nationwide, but have not been successful in advancing legislation through the Spanish Parliament.

=== Ukraine ===
In Ukraine, cockfights, as well as fights involving other animals (dogs, geese, etc.) are prohibited by Art. 25 of the Law of Ukraine "On the Protection of Animals from Cruelty" and Art. 299 of the Criminal Code of Ukraine. For organizing cockfights, the culprit can be sentenced to a fine of up to 850 hryvnias (Ukrainian currency) or imprisonment for up to six months.

=== United Kingdom ===
Cockfighting was banned outright in England and Wales and in the British Overseas Territories with the Cruelty to Animals Act 1835. Sixty years later, in 1895, cockfighting was also banned in Scotland, where it had been relatively common in the 18th century. A reconstructed cockpit from Denbigh in North Wales may be found at St Fagans National History Museum in Cardiff and a reference exists in 1774 to a cockpit at Stanecastle in Scotland. One of the few perfect examples of a cockpit which still exist today can be found on Chislehurst Common, in southeast London.

According to a 2017 report by the RSPCA, cockfighting in England and Wales was at a five-year high.

=== United States ===
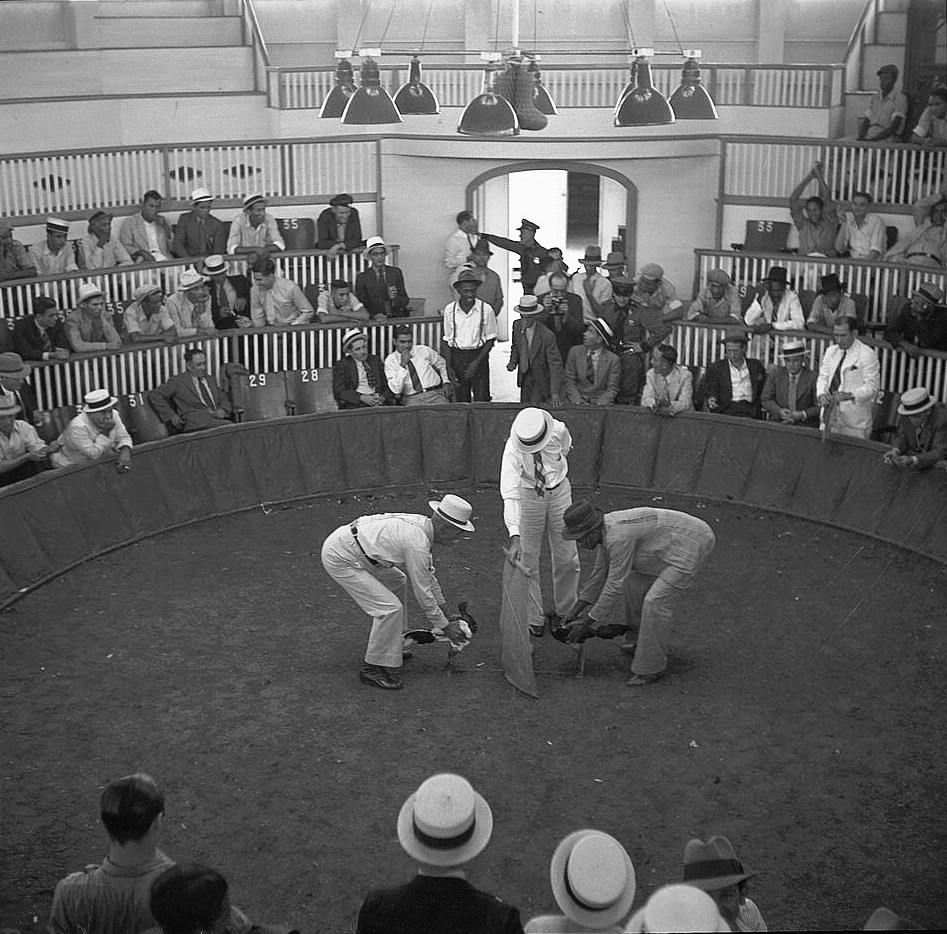
Cockfighting club in Puerto Rico, 1937

As of 2023, cockfighting is illegal in all 50 U.S. states, the District of Columbia, and all U.S. territories. The last state to implement a state law banning cockfighting was Louisiana; the Louisiana State Legislature voted to approve a ban in June 2007, which went into effect in August 2008.

As of 2013:

- Cockfighting is a felony in 40 states and the District of Columbia.
- The possession of birds for fighting is prohibited in 39 states and the District of Columbia.
- Being a spectator at a cockfight is prohibited in 43 states and the District of Columbia.
- The possession of cockfighting implements is prohibited in 15 states.

Additionally, the 2014 farm bill, signed into law by President Barack Obama, contained a provision making it a federal crime to attend an animal fighting event or bring a child under the age of 16 to an animal fighting event.

The cockfighting ban was further extended by federal law to include U.S. territories—American Samoa, the Northern Mariana Islands, Guam, Puerto Rico, and the U.S. Virgin Islands—effective at the end of 2019, as signed into law in the 2018 farm bill by President Donald Trump. In Puerto Rico, cockfighting is popular and has been considered a "national sport" since at least the 1950s. According to a National Park Service report, it generates about $100 million annually. There are some 200,000 fighting birds annually on the island. Puerto Rico's Cockfighting Commission regulates 87 clubs, but many non-government sanctioned "underground" cockfighting operations exist. On December 18, 2019, estimating that cockfighting employs 27,000 people and has a value to the economy of about $18 million, Puerto Rico passed a law attempting to keep the practice legal despite the imminent federal ban. In 2021, governor Pedro Pierluisi announced the government would support a legal effort before the U.S. Supreme Court to overturn the ban. The Supreme Court refused to hear the case, Ortiz-Diaz v. United States, in October 2021, leaving the federal ban in place.

The Animal Fighting Prohibition Enforcement Act, a federal law that made it a federal crime to transfer cockfighting implements across state or national borders and increasing the penalty for violations of federal animal fighting laws to three years in prison, became law in 2007. It passed the House of Representatives 368–39 and the Senate by unanimous consent and was signed into law by President George W. Bush.

The Animal Welfare Act was amended again in 2008 when provisions were included in the 2008 Farm Bill (P.L. 110–246). These provisions tightened prohibitions on dog and other animal fighting activities, and increased penalties for violations of the act.

Major law enforcement raids against cockfighting occurred in February 2014 in New York State (when 3,000 birds were seized and nine men were charged with felony animal-fighting in "Operation Angry Birds", the state's largest-ever cockfighting bust) and in May 2017 in California (when the Los Angeles County Sheriff's Department seized 7,000 cockfighting birds at a ranch in Val Verde, California, one of the largest cockfighting busts in U.S. history).

=== Vietnam ===
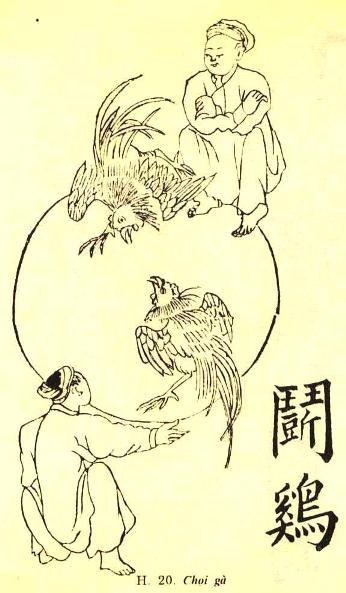
Painting of cockfighting scenes in Vietnam during the Nguyễn dynasty in the book Mechanics and Crafts of the People of Annam

Cockfighting is popular in Vietnam, with a long history dating back to the Lý dynasty. According to historical records, the soldiers of Lý Thường Kiệt brought the practice back to Vietnam after conquering Champa. During the feudal era, cockfighting was a popular form of entertainment for the emperor, officials, and the upper class. The emperors often held cockfights during festivals such as Tết Nguyên Đán (Vietnamese New Year) and Tết Trung Thu (Mid-Autumn Festival) to entertain their guests.

While cockfighting was initially popular amongst ethnic minorities in rural and mountainous areas, it is no longer limited to any particular demographic, or geographic region. Though still popular amongst amateurs, with local tournaments organized across the country, a commercialized, cockfighting industry has emerged. Police have taken down large-scale cockfighting dens and rings through parts of the country, with arrests being made as well as seizures of roosters and money as evidence. Large amounts of money were being gambled in these rings.

== Gallery ==
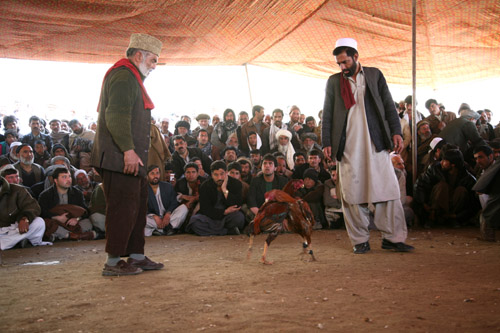
Cockfight on the outskirts of Kabul, Afghanistan

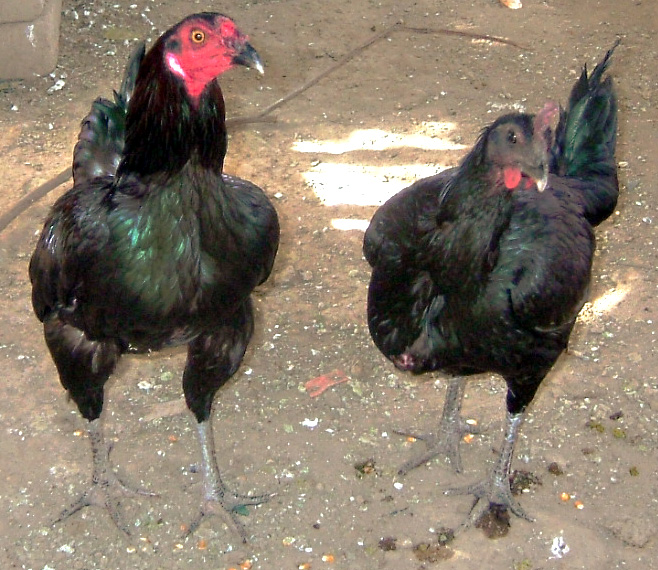
Cockfight in Lima, Peru

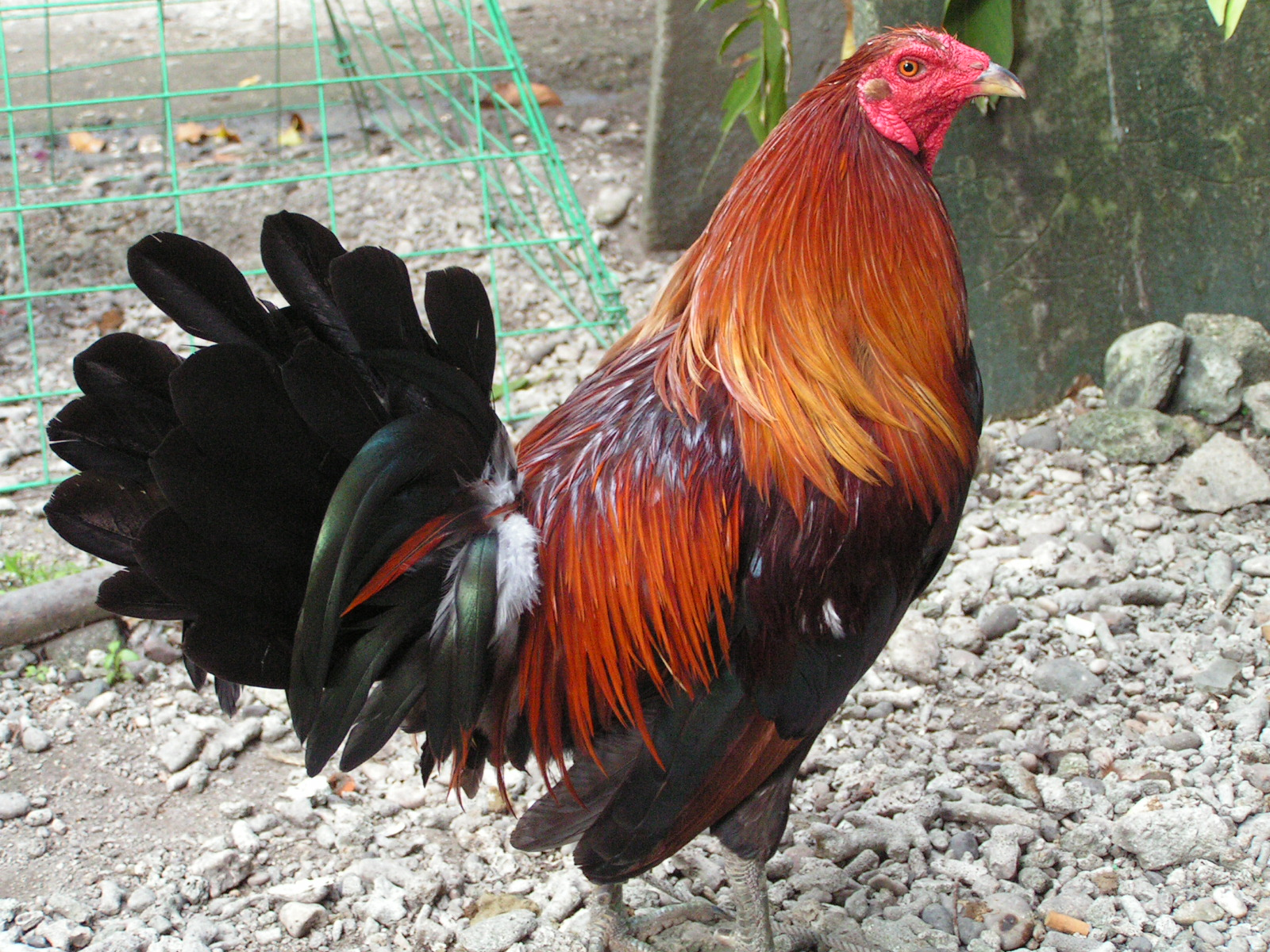
A Philippine gamecock

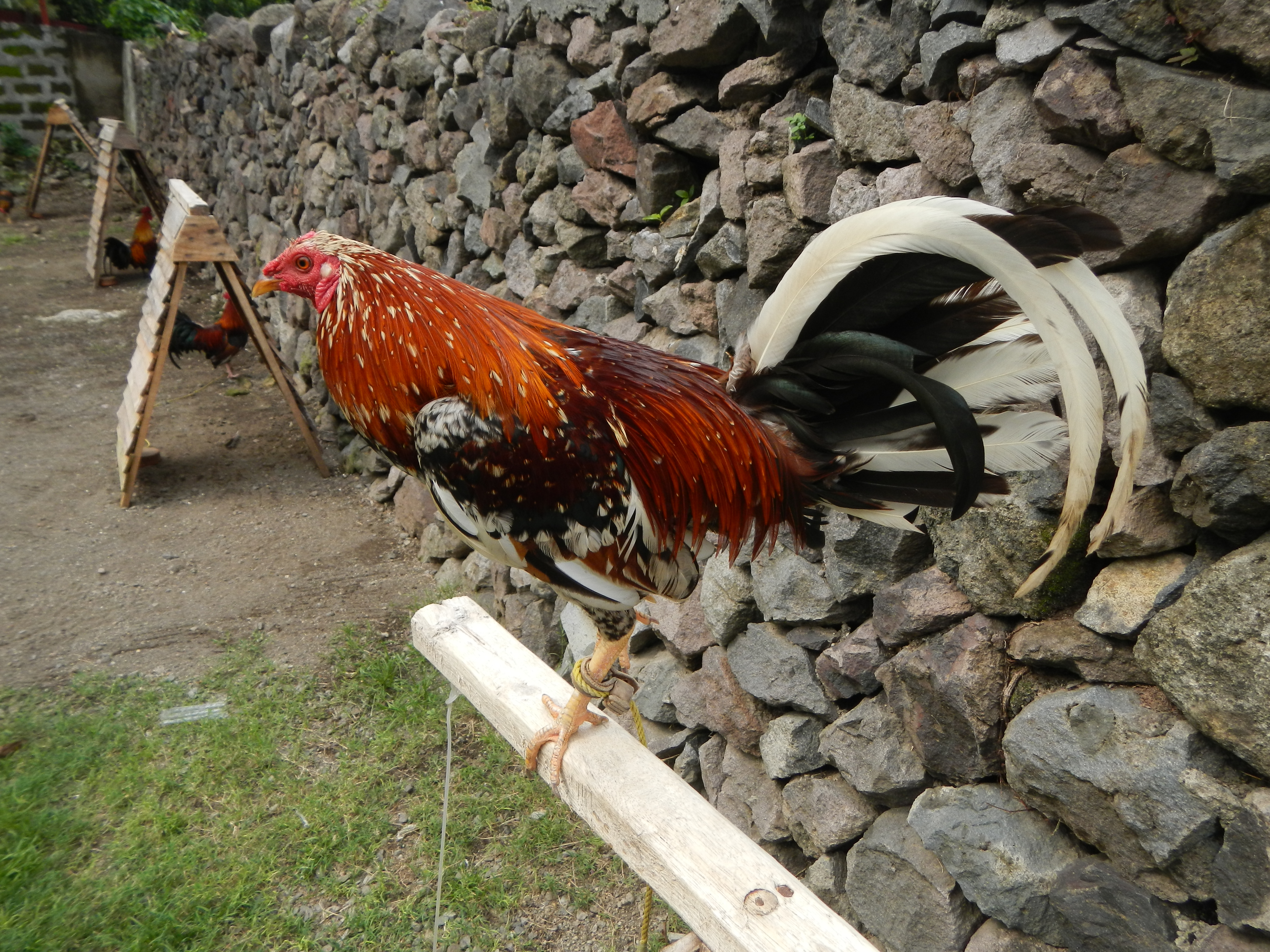
A Philippine "lasak", or off-color fighting cock in teepee, gamecocks cord

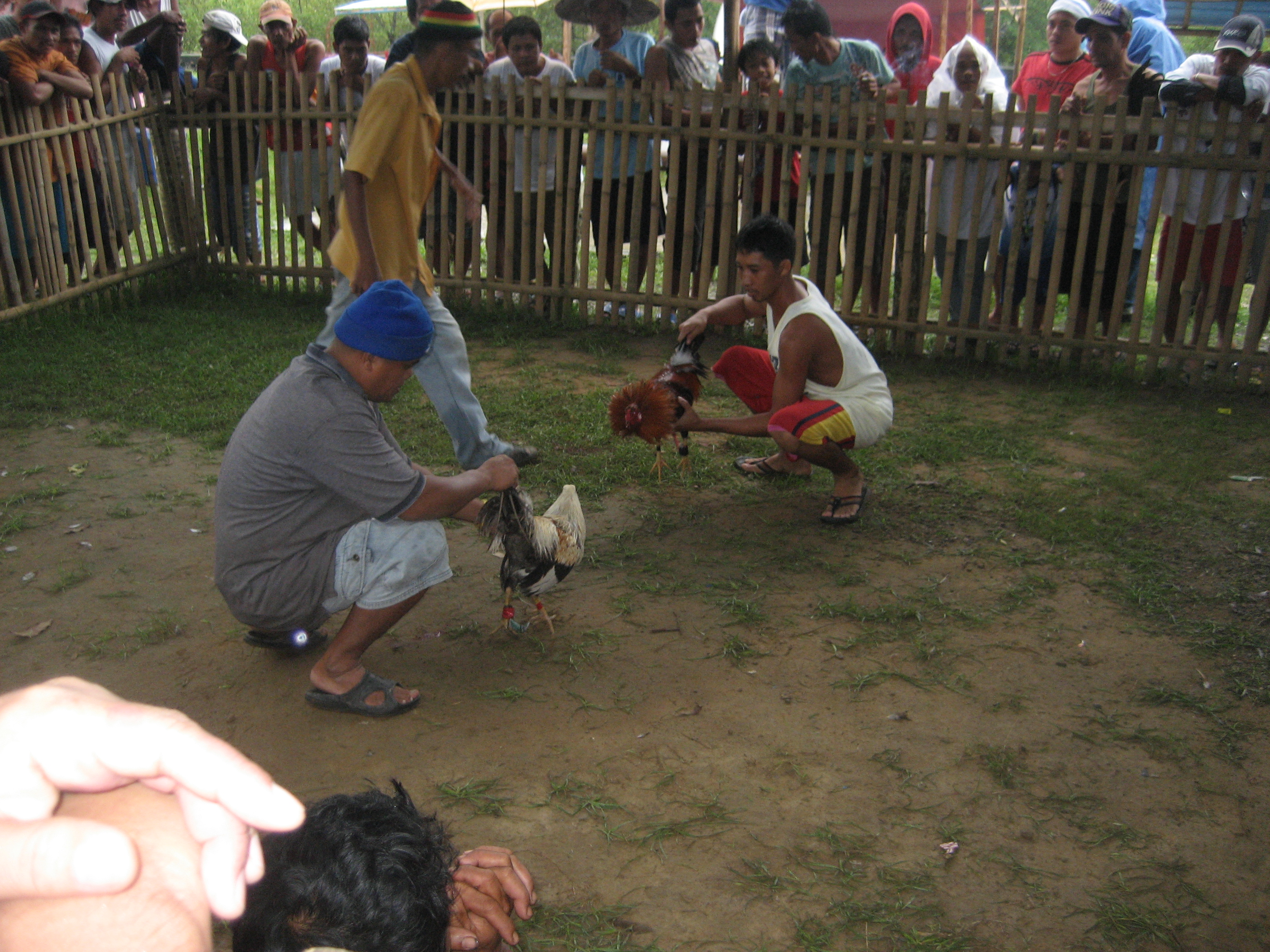
Cockfight in Hilongos, Philippines

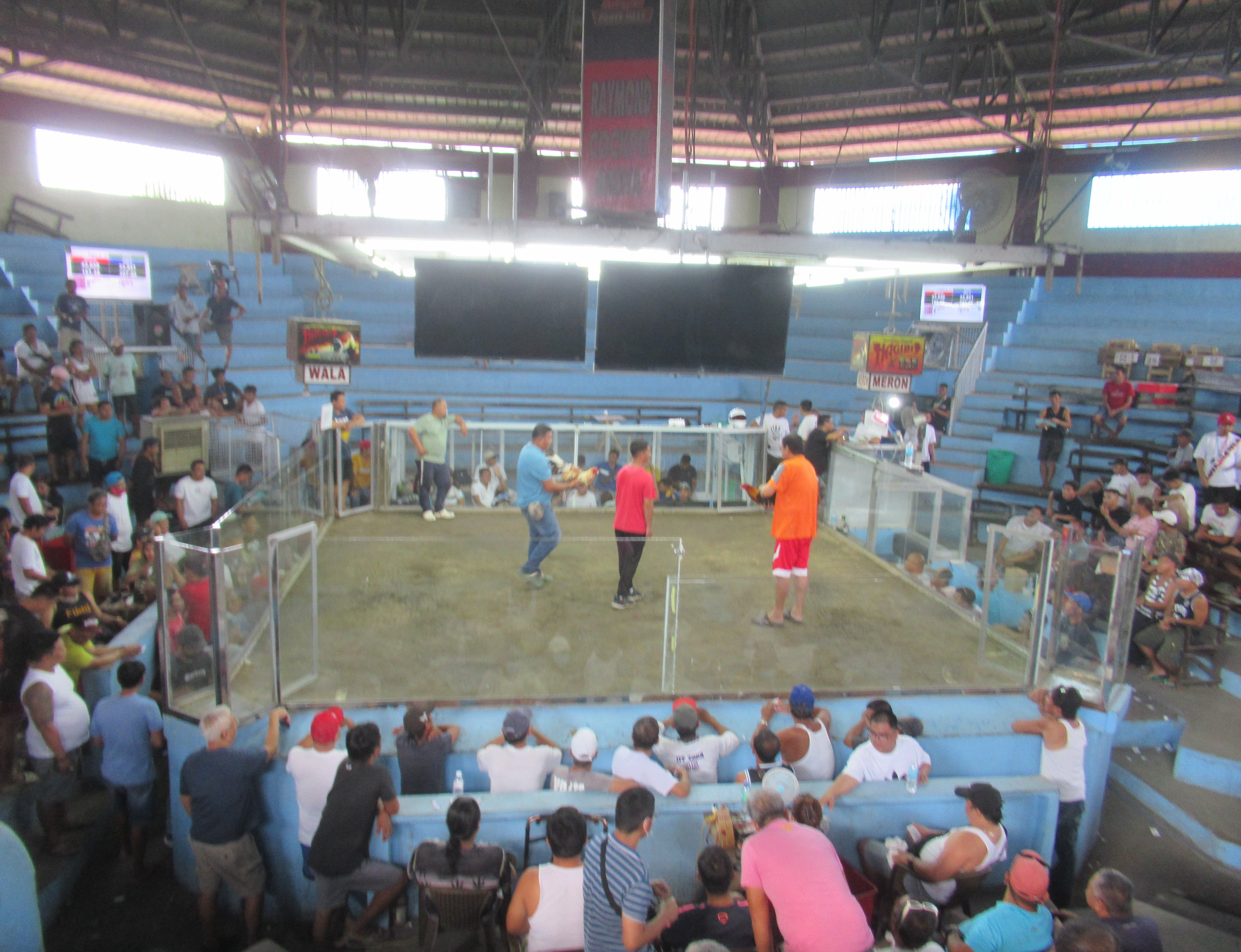
2024 Philippines legal cockfighting - garden soil arena (gradas), bettors (sabungero), referee (sentensyador-koyme), kristos, confronting cocks at "Meron and Wala" (lyamado-dehado), "bet taker" (promoter, matador-casador) and handlers-("taga-bitaw")

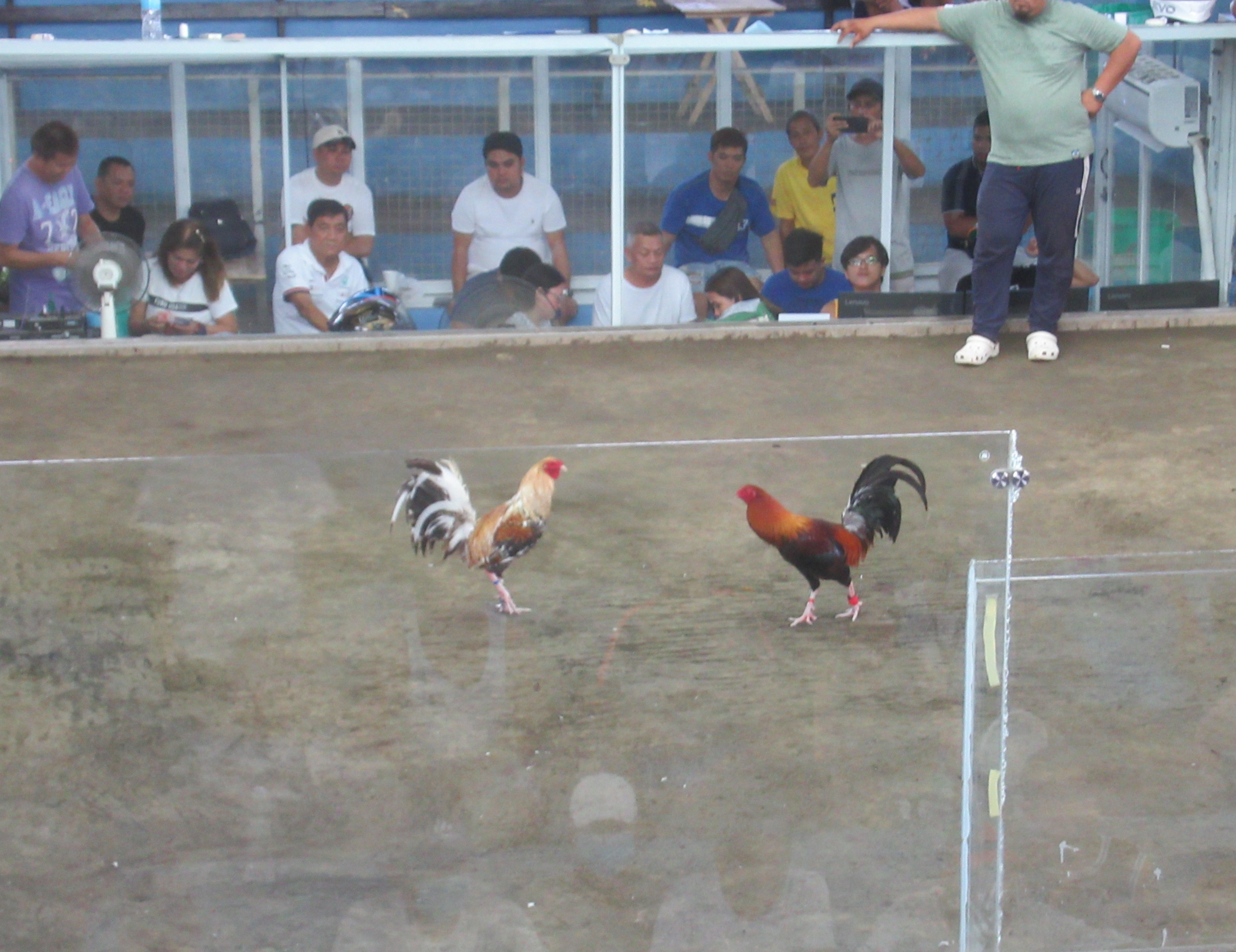
Confronting gamefowls for "sabong" (fighting)

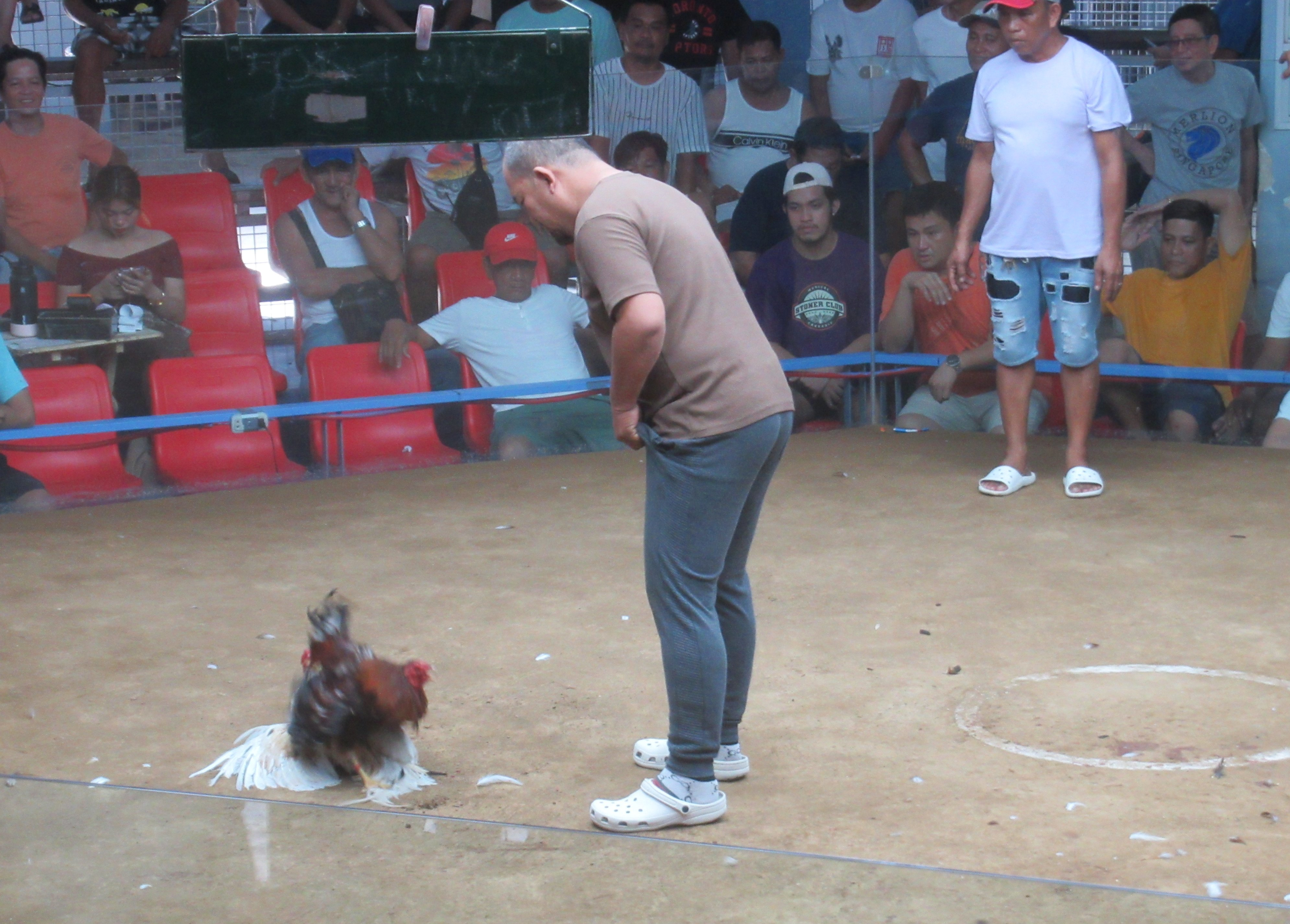
Referee ("sentensyador-koyme")

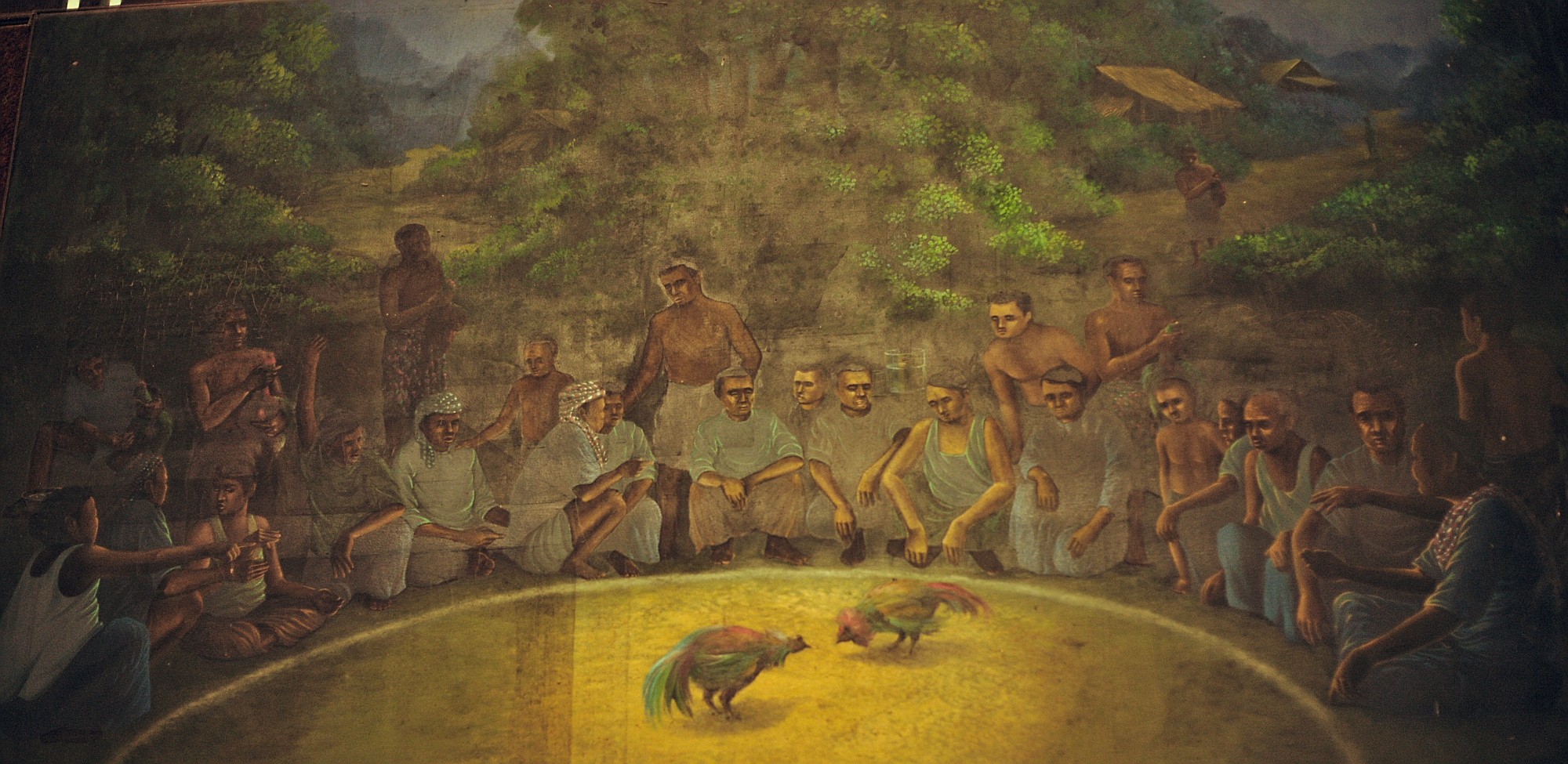
Painting of a traditional cockfighting village scene in southern Thailand

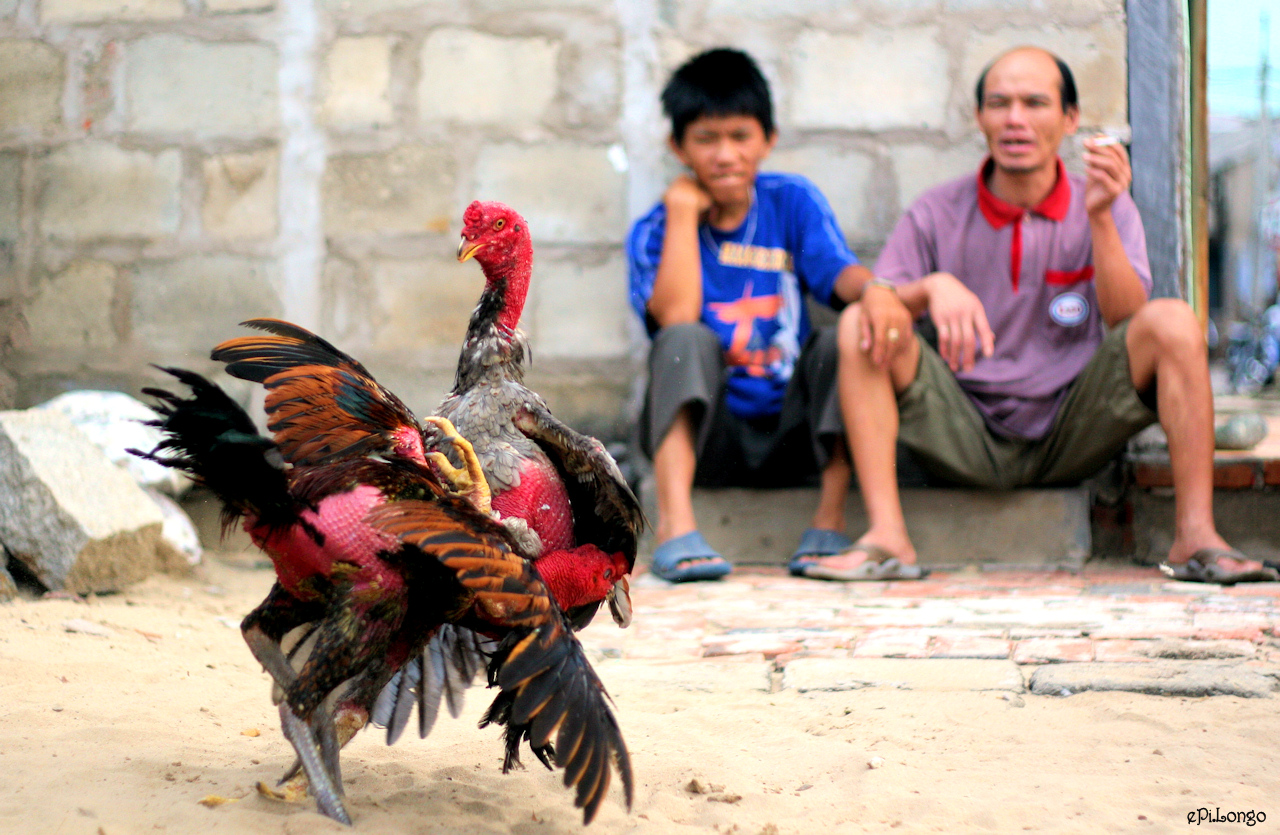
Cockfight in Vietnam

== See also ==
- Dog fighting
- Dubbing (poultry)
- Illegal sports
- Insect fighting
- Ram fighting
- Shamo (chicken)
- Bloodsport
- Cruelty to animals
- Bullfighting
