= Wantilan =

Balinese pavilion

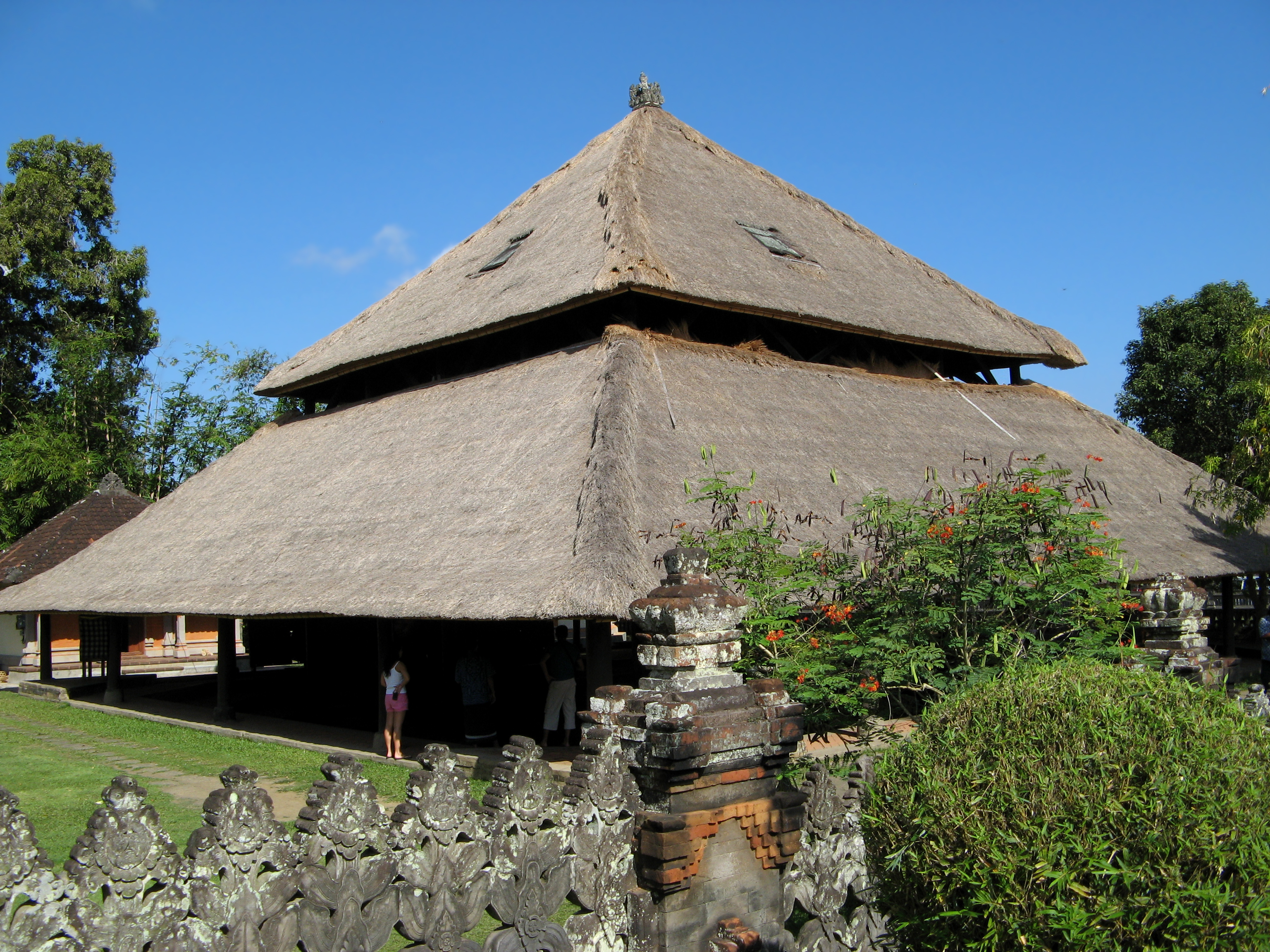
A Wantilan at Pura Taman Ayun, with a lowered central area for a stage used to hold a cockfighting ceremony.

A wantilan (Balinese script: ᬯᬦ᭄ᬢᬶᬮᬦ᭄) is a Balinese pavilion (bale) used for activities involving large crowds. A wantilan is the largest type of bale in Balinese architecture. A wantilan is basically a large wall-less hall placed under a large multi-tiered roof. A wantilan as a public building is usually located at a village's main square or main junction and functions as an open hall to hold large community activities such as meeting halls or a public musical gamelan performance. A wantilan is also a religious building, an integral part of Balinese temples used to hold the Balinese cockfighting ceremony (Balinese tajen).

== Form ==
The wantilan is an imposing pavilion built over a low plinth and topped with two or three tiered pyramidal roofs. The building has no walls. The enormous roof is traditionally supported by four main posts and twelve or twenty peripheral posts. The roof is normally constructed in two or three tiers (Balinese matumpang), covered with clay pantiles or thatched material.

The space of a wantilan is usually a simple flat floor, sometimes with a stage on the other end where gamelan or traditional dances can be performed. Sometimes the floor is designed like a rectangular amphitheater facing a central raised stage; this kind of wantilan is usually used for holding a cockfighting ceremony. A wantilan is typically found at the center of a Balinese village (public-use) or at the outermost courtyard of a Balinese temple compound (religious-use).

== Use ==
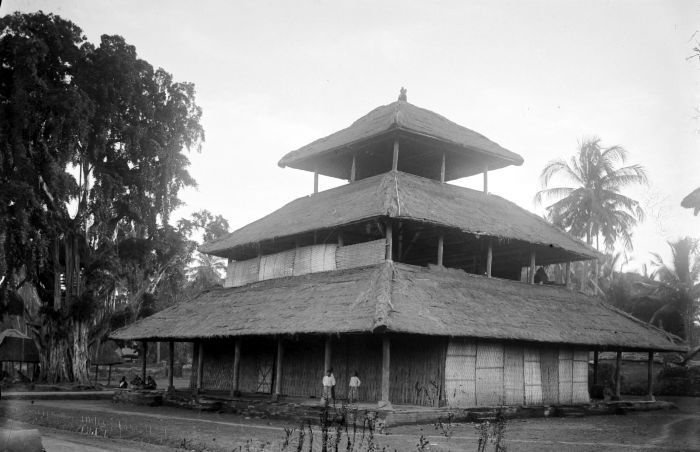
A cockfighting wantilan in Gianyar.

A wantilan is used for large community activities such as communal meetings, which are held by simply sitting on the floor. In modern times, a wantilan is used for sport activities, performances, traditional dance classes, or even to hold a seminar or as a dining hall of a restaurant. In Ubud, a wantilan is located close to Pasar Ubud farmer's market at the street junction of Jalan Raya Ubud and Jalan Suweta.

A wantilan is an integral part of a Balinese temple. In a Balinese templex complex, the wantilan is normally placed in the jaba (outermost) part of the temple compound, close to the candi bentar gateway. This wantilan is traditionally used to hold the gamelan performance or to hold the cockfighting (Balinese tajen) ceremony during certain events. Cockfighting is a religious obligation at every Balinese temple festival or religious ceremony. Cockfighting is an old tradition in Balinese Hinduism, dating from the 10th-century AD. The cockfighting ritual of Bali is a form of animal sacrifice, known as tabuh rah ("pouring blood"), which is practiced as a religious purification ritual to expel evil spirits.

Cockfighting used to be held not only in the wantilan of the temple compound, but also in a village's wantilan, where it mostly serves no religious purpose. Since 1981, the government of Indonesia has banned cockfighting activities in Indonesia, when it is considered as gambling. Since then, holding the tajen in a village wantilan has been banned, with the exception in a temple compound. A wantilan in Pura Taman Ayun temple complex still holds a cockfighting ceremony during a certain purification ritual.

== See also ==
- Balinese temple
- Animal sacrifice in Hinduism

== Cited works ==
- Couteau, Jean (2005). Bali Today: Love and social life, By Jean Couteau. Jakarta: Kepustakaan Populer Gramedia.
- Davison, Julian (2003). Balinese architecture. Singapore: Tuttle Publishing. ISBN 9780794600716.
- Raharjo, Supratikno; Munandar, Agus Aris (1998). Sejarah Kebudayaan Bali: Kajian Perkembangan dan Dampak Pariwisata [History of Balinese Culture: Research and Development on the Impact of Tourism] (in Indonesian). Jakarta: Direktorat Jenderal Kebudayaan.
- Windhu, Ida Bagus Oka (1984). Bangunan Tradisional Bali Serta Fungsinya [Traditional Building of Bali and its Function] (in Indonesian). Jakarta: Direktorat Jenderal Kebudayaan.
