= Gambling in Madagascar =

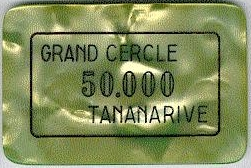
A casino token from the Grand Cercle casino in Madagascar, c. 1995.

Gambling may have existed for centuries in Madagascar. Betting on cockfighting is a common and legal form of gambling in the country, dating back to the 18th century, and cock fights there have been described as "more popular than football."
