= New Ground, Uxbridge Moor =

Venue for cricket matches between 1740 and 1790

Coordinates: 51.538°N 0.504°W

- Interactive map of New Ground, Uxbridge Moor
- Location: Uxbridge, Middlesex
- Home club: Middlesex
- Establishment: c.1740
- Last used: c.1790

The New Ground, Uxbridge Moor near Uxbridge, Middlesex was used as a venue for cricket matches between 1740 and 1790. It was an occasional home ground for Middlesex county cricket team (pre-1864) and by the local Uxbridge club and was used for two matches, one in 1789 and the other in 1790.
