= Chislehurst Cricket Club =

Historical English cricket team

In the 18th century, Chislehurst Cricket Club was based in Chislehurst, Kent, and took part in several historically important matches between 1738 and 1746. (Note: Any match listed in the ACS' Important Match Guide (1981) is historically important, and therefore of the highest standard, whether or not a scorecard might exist. The same applies to numerous matches discovered by researchers since 1981. For further information, see First-class cricket.) Its home matches were played on Chislehurst Common. The old club's modern equivalent is the Chislehurst and West Kent Cricket Club, which also plays on the common at Cricket Ground Road.

== History ==
Chislehurst is first recorded as an historically important team in July 1738 when it played London on Chislehurst Common in a game that "turned several times" until finally being won by London. A rematch was quickly arranged, and took place at the Artillery Ground a week later. Chislehurst won this game by 5 wickets, and so a decider took place in September. This was also at the Artillery Ground, and was won by London.

The team played four more matches against London from 1739 to 1741. London won by unknown margin on Chislehurst Common in June 1740, and Chislehurst won by 60 runs on the Artillery Ground in July 1741. The other two results are not on record.

In 1743, a combined Chislehurst and Bromley XI played London in two matches. In 1746, a combined Chislehurst and London team played Addington.

== Today ==
Cricket is still played on Chislehurst Common as the Chislehurst and West Kent Cricket Club has its ground there on the appropriately named Cricket Ground Road. The club is an amalgamation of two 19th-century clubs. The West Kent Cricket Club was originally based in Bromley but lost its ground in 1821 due to the enclosure of Bromley Common. The club was rescued by an offer from the Chislehurst authorities to let them establish a new ground on Chislehurst Common. In 1876, three small local clubs amalgamated and called themselves the Chislehurst Cricket Club and agreement was reached so that the two clubs shared Cricket Ground Road for the next 100 years. West Kent CC was dissolved in 1980 and the Chislehurst club, now known as the Chislehurst and West Kent Cricket Club, has sole use of the ground.

== Bibliography ==
- ACS (1981). A Guide to Important Cricket Matches Played in the British Isles 1709–1863. Nottingham: ACS. OCLC 85045528.
- ACS (1982). A Guide to First-class Cricket Matches Played in the British Isles. Nottingham: ACS. OCLC 10586869.
- Waghorn, H. T. (1899). Cricket Scores, Notes, &c. From 1730–1773. Edinburgh: Blackwood. OCLC 1086375331.
- Waghorn, H. T. (2005) [1906]. The Dawn of Cricket. London: J. W. McKenzie. ISBN 978-09-47821-17-3.
