= Dominican Today =

Online Dominican newspaper

- Type: Daily newspaper
- Format: Electronic
- Owner(s): Dominican Today
- Founded: 2006
- Headquarters: Santo Domingo, Dominican Republic
- Website: Dominicantoday.com

Dominican Today is an online, English-language newspaper based in Santo Domingo, Dominican Republic. It is the first English-language online news publication in the country.

The site Dominican Today was launched on March 23, 2005, and is owned by the media group Portal Alta Technologia PATRD).

Its founder, Avishai (1947–2006), a native of Israel, also established the Dominican web-design company Merit Designs.
