= Chislehurst Common =

Park in London, England

Coordinates: 51.409°N 0.066°E

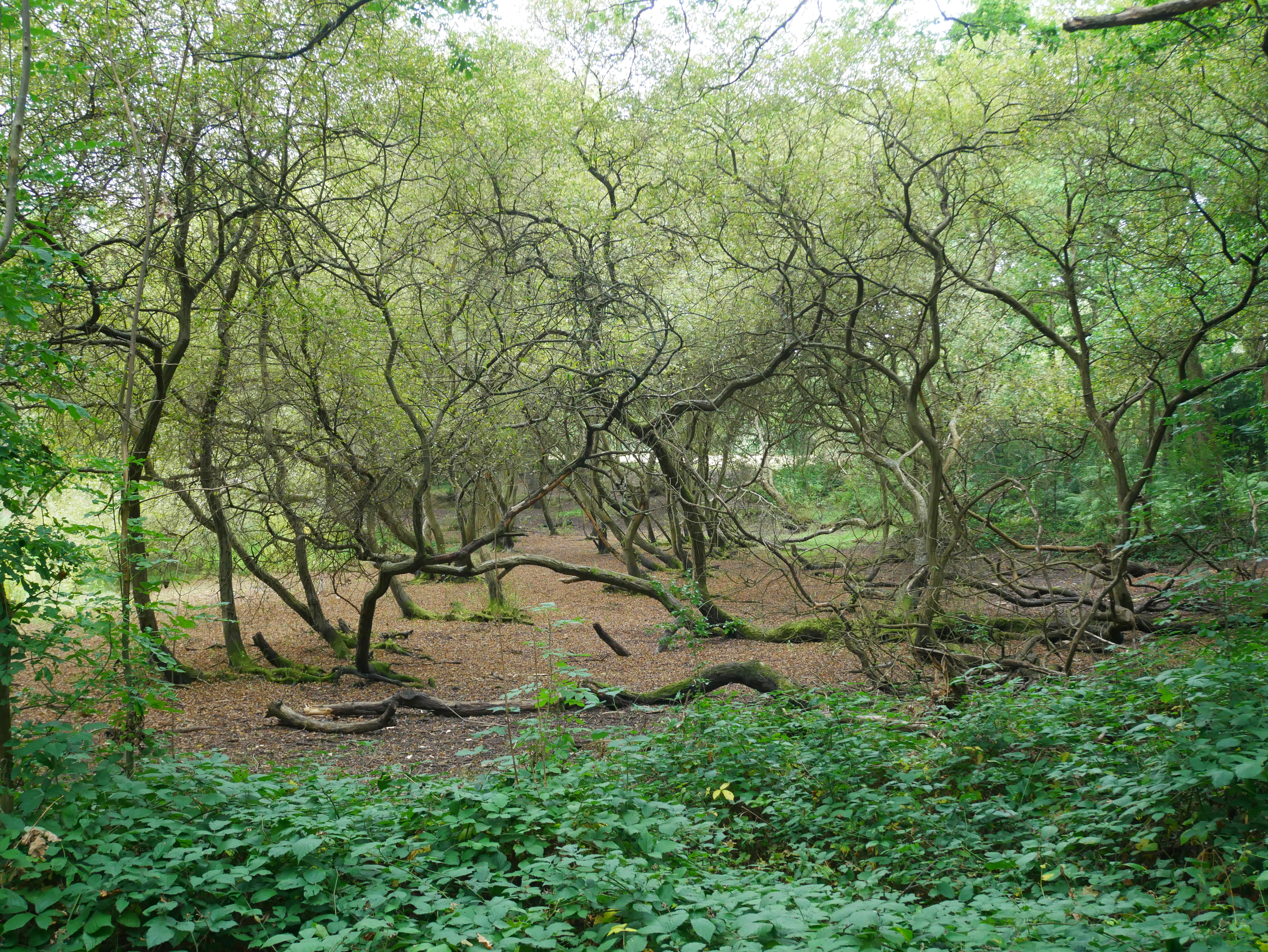
Woodland on Chislehurst Common

Chislehurst Common is an open space in Chislehurst in the London Borough of Bromley in south-east London. It is jointly managed with St Paul's Cray Common.

The common was used for cricket matches in the 18th century. It was the home venue of Chislehurst Cricket Club which played several known matches against London Cricket Club from 1738 to 1741. Cricket is still played on Chislehurst Common as the Chislehurst and West Kent Cricket Club has its ground in the south-west corner of the common on Cricket Ground Road.

== Cricket venue ==
Chislehurst Common cricket ground
- Interactive map of Chislehurst Common cricket ground
- Location: Chislehurst
- Home club: Chislehurst Cricket Club
- Establishment: by 1738

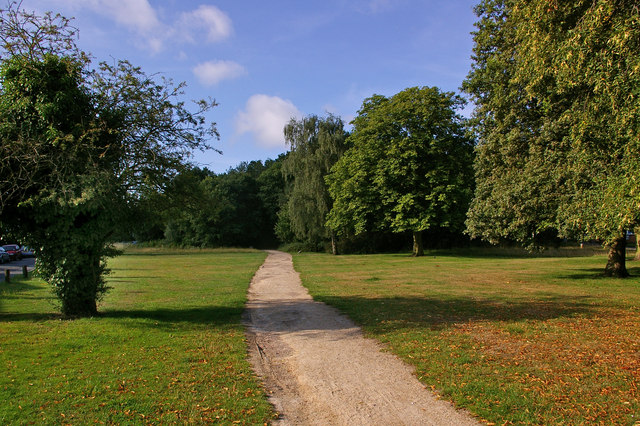
Chislehurst Common

The earliest known use of Chislehurst Common for cricket was in July 1738 when Chislehurst played London in a game that "turned several times" until finally being won by London. The venue was subsequently used in June 1740 for another Chislehurst v. London match, again won by London. It was the intended venue for Kent to play London on 26 June 1741, but it was rained off.

The Chislehurst club declined after 1741. The Common was used in 1752 when Kent played Surrey, although it was used occasionally for cricket during the 19th and 20th centuries.
