= 1752 English cricket season =

Cricket season review

The popularity of single wicket seems to have waned in the 1752 English cricket season, as no significant matches can be found in the sources. The famous Dartford club enjoyed a resurgence, and played two matches against England. Details of twelve historically important eleven-a-side matches are known. (Note: Any match listed in the ACS' Important Match Guide (1981) is historically important, and therefore of the highest standard, whether or not a scorecard might exist. The same applies to numerous matches discovered by researchers since 1981. For further information, see First-class cricket.)

== Impact of the Gregorian calendar ==
1752 was a very important year in dating terms. The Gregorian calendar, first devised in 1582, was finally adopted in Great Britain. An 11-day discrepancy between the Julian and Gregorian versions was corrected by having Wednesday, 2 September 1752 followed by Thursday, 14 September 1752. For the purposes of cricket history, the calendar change had minimal impact because the cricket season never began before 25 March (the former New Year's Day), and so the year is always the same whether a Julian or Gregorian date is used, apart from a few 'out of season' references that need to be noted accordingly, and care has to be taken with any contemporary sources that insisted on using the Julian date after the Gregorian Calendar was introduced (see below).

The Daily Advertiser on Saturday, 29 August (Julian) announced that a Deptford v Westminster match would take place at Upper Fountain, Deptford, on Thursday, 14 September (i.e., day one itself of the Gregorian Calendar immediately following the last Julian date of Wednesday, 2 September). Tom Faulkner and one of the Harris brothers were to be given men on the Deptford team. On Thursday, 21 September (Gregorian), the Daily Advertiser announced postponement of the match to Thursday, 28 September, and reported that John Bryant and 'two from Chislehurst' would play for Deptford instead of Faulkner and Harris 'who were not allowed to play'.

On Friday, 29 September (Gregorian), a match between Sussex and Surrey on Long Down, near Chichester, was an interesting one in calendar terms. The post-match report was in the Sussex Weekly Advertiser dated Thursday, 16 October (Julian), which should officially have been dated Thursday, 5 October (Gregorian). The report says: 'Last Friday se'enight the great Match at Cricket between Surrey and Sussex was finished, on Long Down, when Surrey beat by about four score Notches'. The match took place on Friday, 29 September (Gregorian), not Friday, 10 October (Julian) as the source infers.

== Dartford v England ==
On 29 July, Dartford hosted England on Dartford Brent. The Dartford team was pre-announced as William Hodsoll, John Bryant, Robert Eures, and 8 others of 'the parish of Dartford'. Their opponents were 'any 11 men to be chosen and taken in any part of England'. The result is unknown.

The second match was 11 August, again on Dartford Brent. The announcement said: 'Dartford with 4 men allowed against 11 men to be picked out of All England, for £20 a side'. Result unknown.

== Bromley v London ==
There were two matches between Bromley and London. The first was played 30 June on Bromley Common. London scored 52 and 92; Bromley replied with 60 and were 52 for 5 when play ended, presumably because of rain. The precise venue was the White Hart field on Bromley Common. Stakes were £50 a side. Bromley had John Mansfield (Sevenoaks) and Howard (Kent) as given men.

The return match was 15 July on the Artillery Ground. It had been postponed from Monday, 6 July due to wet weather. The result is unknown.

== Addington in 1752 ==
Addington played two matches against Westminster, and one against Dartford. Both of the Westminster matches were played at Tothill Fields, Westminster, on 20 July and 3 August. The first match is result unknown, and Westminster won the second by 10 runs. Westminster's team on 20 July included Stephen Dingate, William Anderson, Little and Tall Bennett, Perry, and John Capon. The Addington team included John Mansfield, George Jackson, John Frame, William Durling, Joe Harris, and John Harris.

Addington's match against Dartford was set for 12 August on Addington Hills, but the outcome is unknown.

== Single wicket ==
No surviving records have been found of single wicket matches in 1752.

== Other events ==
On Thursday, 27 February (Julian), the Daily Advertiser reported that George Smith of the Artillery Ground had taken the late Duke of Somerset's house at Marlborough and intended to open it as an inn. Smith offered the Artillery Ground and its dwelling house, etc. on lease for 7 years. Smith had evidently overcome his bankruptcy problems in 1748.

On Saturday, 30 May (Julian), the Daily Advertiser carried a notice re the Artillery Ground that 'gentlemen may be supplied with bats and balls' and that 'the ground is kept in good order for play by your humble servant William Sharpe'.

Kent v Surrey was due to be played 17 June on Chislehurst Common. It was advertised the day before in the Daily Advertiser by George Williams of the White Lion at Streatham, who said he would 'provide the best of liquors and a cold collation; he humbly hoped the noblemen and gentlemen would do him the honour of regaling themselves'. The result of the match is unknown.

London were to play Edmonton, 29 July on the Artillery Ground. The result is unknown. The prize was 10 guineas.

The Daily Advertiser on Monday, 31 August (two days before the end of the Julian Calendar) announced a game on the same day between 'Marybone (sic) Club' and 11 of London for a guinea a man: 'to meet at Francis Ludgate's, the Sun and Sportsman next the church. Wickets to be pitched at 1, and the match played out'. This 'Marylebone Club' had no connection with the later Marylebone Cricket Club (MCC).

On the same day, there was a match at Durdham Down, near Bristol, between Bristol and London for 20 guineas. This was announced in Felix Farley’s Bristol Journal on Saturday, 29 August (Julian).

== First mentions ==
=== Clubs and teams ===
- Bristol
- Deptford

=== Venues ===
- Durdham Down
- Long Down, near Chichester
- Upper Fountain, Deptford

== Bibliography ==
- ACS (1981). A Guide to Important Cricket Matches Played in the British Isles 1709–1863. Nottingham: ACS. OCLC 85045528.
- Bowen, Rowland (1970). Cricket: A History of its Growth and Development. London: Eyre & Spottiswoode. ISBN 978-04-13278-60-9.
- Buckley, G. B. (1935). Fresh Light on 18th Century Cricket. Birmingham: Cotterell & Co. OCLC 23450280.
- McCann, Tim (2004). Sussex Cricket in the Eighteenth Century (PDF). Vol. 88. Lewes: West Sussex Record Office. ISBN 978-08-54450-55-8.
