= 1735 English cricket season =

Cricket season review

In the 1735 English cricket season, the active teams were Kent, Middlesex, Surrey, and Sussex in county cricket; and the Croydon and London clubs. Details of fifteen historically important matches are known. (Note: Any match listed in the ACS' Important Match Guide (1981) is historically important, and therefore of the highest standard, whether or not a scorecard might exist. The same applies to numerous matches discovered by researchers since 1981. For further information, see First-class cricket.)

Kent patron Edwin Stead, believed to have become a bankrupt, died aged 33 or 34 in London on Thursday, 28 August. The leadership of Kent cricket passed to the Sackvilles of Knole House, Sevenoaks.

== London v Croydon ==
After the fall-out between the London and Croydon clubs in 1734, there seems to have been a reconciliation during the close season, because the opening match of the 1735 season was between their two teams at Duppas Hill. It was played on Whit Tuesday (27 May), and The Weekly Register reported on the 31st that "London beat Croydon with very great ease".

The reconciliation may have been temporary, because it was not until July 1742 that the teams are known to have met again. Croydon had apparently faded from the scene, and are found in sources only occasionally after 1736, when they played three matches against Chertsey.

== Surrey v London ==
There were four matches between Surrey and London in 1735. The first was played 7 June on Moulsey Hurst. The scores are known, and also some of the players' names. Surrey batted first, and scored 54 and 44 in their two innings. London replied with 61 and 38/1 to win by 9 wickets. Taking part were Cook, Dunn, Ellis, and Wheatley of London; and at least two players called Wood who played for Surrey. Ellis, London's "best bowler", could not play because of an injured finger. Cook, a Brentford player who was "reckoned one of the best bowlers in England", was brought in to bowl instead of him. The Surrey players called Wood evidently came from Woodcote; and one of them was injured during the game. After London lost one wicket in their second innings, the target was reached by Wheatley, who was a distiller, and Dunn. Never before had so many players' names been given in a match report.

The second match was played 18 June on the Artillery Ground. The General Evening Post (GEP) reported on Thursday, 12 June, that it would be played on Kennington Common, but the match was shifted to the Artillery Ground, as reported by the London Evening Post (LEP) on Saturday, 14 June. The GEP report had mentioned a Mr Jervoise of Croydon, who was the organiser of Surrey. He had "selected eleven men out of Croydon and that neighbourhood in Surrey", but he had omitted the "three or four bunglers" who had played at Moulsey Hurst on the 7th. London, batting first, lost their first wicket at 22/1, and this was seen as an achievement by the LEP whose report says: "the Londoners got 22 notches before ever a man was out". London's total in the first innings was 67, and Surrey replied with 97. London scored 72 in the second innings, leaving Surrey with a target of 43 to win. Surrey had reached 33/7 when time ran out, and the result was a draw.

Little is known of the other two matches, which were both played on Kennington Common. The London Daily Post on Saturday, 19 July, reported that London had beaten Surrey "with ease" the previous day. The fourth match on 23 September was to be played "for a considerable sum", but the result is unknown.

== Kent matches ==
On 12 July, a London & Middlesex combine hosted Kent at Moulsey Hurst. London & Middlesex scored 95 and 41; Kent responded with 80 & 57/6 to win by 4 wickets. London & Middlesex consisted of eight players of the London club and three of Middlesex, including Cook of Brentford. Kent's patron was the Earl of Middlesex, who was the eldest son of the 1st Duke of Dorset. Their opponents were backed by the Prince of Wales. The match was staged for £1,000 a side.

The General Evening Post reported that the London team was imbalanced by inclusion of the three Middlesex men, and lost the match for that reason. The Prince of Wales was reported as saying that his team in the return match would therefore be an all-London XI. As G. B. Buckley says, this was "an early appreciation of teamwork". The report confirmed that a second match would be played in two weeks on Bromley Common.

The return on 26 July was titled Kent v London, as the Prince of Wales kept his promise to select an all-London team. London scored 73 and 32; Kent responded with 97 and 9/0 to win by 10 wickets. The report states that a large crowd attended and "a great deal of mischief was done". It seems that horses panicked and riders were thrown while some members of the crowd were "rode over". One man was "carried off for dead" as "HRH" passed by at the entrance to the Common.

Kent also played two matches against Sussex on 13 and 20 August. The first was in Lewes, possibly at The Dripping Pan, and Sussex won by an unknown margin. The source for it is a letter from John Whaley to Horace Walpole dated Wednesday, 13 August. He says Sussex "seem as much pleased as if they had got an Election". He also reported that "we have been at supper with them all" until one o'clock in the morning.

Kent won the second match at Sevenoaks Vine. The London Evening Post speculated that "the Conqueror" (i.e., a decider) between Kent and Sussex, led by Lord John Sackville and Lord Gage respectively, would be played in a few days, but there is no record of a further match.

== Westminster matches ==
The Westminster team was active in 1735, and played in three matches. The first on 11 June was against Greenwich in Blackheath for a stake of £500. Expected to attend were the Prince of Wales, the Earl of Middlesex, and Lord John Philip Sackville. The result is unknown.

Westminster then played London at Tothill Fields on 16 August, and won by three runs. A report in the General Evening Post says simply that Westminster won "by 3 notches", and that a return would be held Thursday, 28 August, at the Artillery Ground. The result of that match is unknown.

== Single wicket ==
The GEP on Thursday, 7 August, announced a single wicket match to be played the following Monday on Kennington Common, involving seven players of the London Club. The game would be three against four with Dunn, Pool, and Wakeland against Ellis, Marshall, and two others.

== Other events ==
On Friday, 25 July, a combined Acton & Brentford team played against Harrow on Willesden Green "for a guinea a man".

On Saturday, 26 July, a Romford v Brentwood match on Shenville Common resulted in a win for Romford by 37 runs.

The death of Edwin Stead, on 28 August, was reported in the Grub Street Journal dated Thursday, 4 September. He was a noted patron of the game from the mid-1720s and may have been a good player too. He was a Maidstone man who undoubtedly did much to promote the game in Kent. A compulsive gambler, it seems he died in reduced circumstances. One account stated that he died "near Charing Cross", and another that he died "in Scotland Yard".

== First mentions ==
=== Clubs and teams ===
- London & Middlesex (combined)
- Westminster

=== Venues ===
- Bromley Common
- Tothill Fields

=== Players ===
| name | club/county | notes |
|---|---|---|
| Cook | Brentford | Described by a contemporary reporter as "one of the best bowlers in England". |
| Dunn | London | Evidently a top order batsman who is mentioned in three match reports. |
| Ellis | London | Described by a contemporary reporter as London's "best bowler". |
| Wakeland | London | Made two known appearances in single wicket contests. |
| Wheatley | London | Evidently a top order batsman, known to have been a distiller by trade. |
| Marshall | London | Recorded in one match in 1735. |
| Pool | London | Recorded in one match in 1735. |
| Mr Jervoise | Croydon and Surrey | A Surrey patron who was active in 1735. |
| Wood | Woodcot, Surrey | Mentioned briefly in a 1735 report. There were apparently two Woods of Woodcot. |

== Bibliography ==
- ACS (1981). A Guide to Important Cricket Matches Played in the British Isles 1709–1863. Nottingham: ACS. OCLC 85045528.
- Buckley, G. B. (1935). Fresh Light on 18th Century Cricket. Birmingham: Cotterell & Co. OCLC 23450280.
- Maun, Ian (2009). From Commons to Lord's, Volume One: 1700 to 1750. Cambridge: Roger Heavens. ISBN 978-19-00592-52-9.
- McCann, Tim (2004). Sussex Cricket in the Eighteenth Century (PDF). Vol. 88. Lewes: West Sussex Record Office. ISBN 978-08-54450-55-8.
- Waghorn, H. T. (1899). Cricket Scores, Notes, &c. From 1730–1773. Edinburgh: Blackwood. OCLC 1086375331.
- Waghorn, H. T. (2005) [1906]. The Dawn of Cricket. London: J. W. McKenzie. ISBN 978-09-47821-17-3.
- Wilson, Martin (2005). An Index to Waghorn. London: Bodyline Books (limited edition, by subscription only).
