= Old Red Lion, Kennington =

Listed pub in London, England

Old Red Lion
- The pub in 2024

- Location within London Borough of Lambeth Location within Greater London

General information
- Architectural style: Tudorbethan
- Location: 42 Kennington Park Road, Kennington, London, England
- Coordinates: 51.489455°N 0.105153°W
- Opened: 1933; 93 years ago
- Client: Hoare & Co Brewery
- Owner: Portobello Starboard Ltd

Design and construction
- Architect: Sidney Clark
- Designations

Listed Building – Grade II
- Official name: The Old Red Lion public house
- Designated: 8 July 2002
- Reference no.: 1061361

Website
- theoldredlion.uk

The Old Red Lion is a Grade II listed public house on Kennington Park Road in Kennington, London, England. Rebuilt in 1933 in the Tudorbethan style, it was designed by inter-war pub architect Sidney Clark on the site of an earlier pub dating from around 1750. Its interior is included in CAMRA's National Inventory of Historic Pub Interiors and is rated three stars, recognising its "outstanding national historic importance".

== History ==
The building is a Tudorbethan-style public house, constructed in 1933 by Hoare & Co Brewery on the site of an earlier pub dating from around 1750. Designed by inter-war pub architect Sidney Clark, it originally included an adjoining off-licence. The rebuilding took place around the time Hoare & Co was being taken over by Charrington Brewery of Mile End.

On 8 July 2002, the Old Red Lion was designated a Grade II listed building. It is regarded by the Campaign for Real Ale (CAMRA) as having an interior of "outstanding national historic importance" and is rated three stars on its National Inventory of Historic Pub Interiors.

Until 2010, the pub was considered possibly the most intact surviving example of an inter-war "Brewers' Tudor" public house in the country. Later alterations by former owners Antic included creating a third room with seating alcoves in the former toilet area and installing an open kitchen at the rear. As of September 2026, the freehold was owned by Portobello Starboard Ltd.

== Architecture ==
=== Exterior ===
The front of the building features decorative timber framing with plaster panels between the beams, while the side walls are built of brick. The roof is covered with tiles and has three prominent chimney stacks, two grouped together on the left and another on the right.

The main pub has two main floors, an attic and a basement. Its uppermost section projects outwards and features a central pointed roof section with decorative wooden edging. Two sets of windows sit beneath it, supported by red-painted brackets shaped like lions. Decorative arched patterns run below the other attic windows, alongside a wooden bracket for a hanging sign. The floor below also has two sets of four-section windows.

At ground level, the front bar area projects outwards and contains two arched windows with frosted coloured glass. The lower sections are finished in brick, with three separate entrances. The right-hand entrance provides access to the upper floors, while the central and left-hand doors lead into the public and saloon bars. Both have small rectangular windows above them and traditional oak doors with curved tops.

The adjoining former off-licence, positioned to the left, is a single-storey brick building with a sloping slate roof. Its former shopfront has decorative rows of arches above and below the windows, brickwork along the lower section incorporating some vertically arranged tiles, and a recessed arched doorway with a rectangular window above.

=== Interior ===
The interior retains much of its original two-bar layout, comprising a public bar and saloon separated by a central wall and connected by two low doorways with Tudor-style arches. The serving area is positioned between the rooms, with a staircase to the right. Glazed panels above the doorways feature a Toby jug, formerly the emblem of Hoare & Co, and a red lion.

Both bars have extensive oak timberwork across the walls and ceilings, including beams with visible tool marks. Oak-panelled entrance areas and decorative timber screens with Tudor-style detailing also survive.

The original panelled bar counters remain on raised tiled bases, with matching bar backs featuring carved decoration, curved arches and heraldic details. Some lower shelving has been replaced by refrigeration units. Original lantern-style lighting also survives.

Three fireplaces have red-painted Tudor-style surrounds, metal hoods and distinctive spiral-patterned brick supports. Decorative heraldic panels appear above two of the fireplaces, with a built-in picture depicting Bonnie Prince Charlie's landing in Scotland positioned between them.

Original doors survive throughout the building, while the former lavatories retain sections of their cream and black tiled decoration and fittings. The toilets have since been moved to the basement, and the former toilet area converted into seating alcoves.

Later alterations by the previous owners, Antic, included creating a third room at the rear and installing an open kitchen, involving the removal of substantial sections of the original rear walls of both bars. The adjoining former off-licence remains standing but is no longer in use.

== See also ==
- List of pubs in London
