= Derwent House =

- Location: 68 Camden Park Road
- Coordinates: 51.410571°N 0.061435°E
- Built: 1899
- Built by: William Willett
- Architect: Ernest Newton

Derwent House, on Camden Park Road, Chislehurst, Bromley, is one of a number of the locally renowned 'Willett-built' houses erected on the Camden Park Estate by high-class speculative builder William Willett in the 1900s.

Willett bought the entire estate in 1890 with the intention of building on it all but the venture was not successful and he erected only a small number of houses there and on Wilderness Road. The remainder of the estate became the Chislehurst Golf Club with the mansion, Camden Place, becoming its clubhouse.

Derwent House was erected in 1899. The design is inspired by the Arts and Crafts movement. It is of red brick in with a red clay tiled roof. It was designed by Ernest Newton and a ballroom was added in 1903 by Amos Faulkner (Willett's in-house architect). Faulkner also designed the detached motor house with carriage-wash canopy. Derwent is a Grade II listed building located within the Chislehurst Conservation Area. Willett lived in a similar Newton house further along at 88 Camden Park Road. A blue plaque on that building commemorates Willett as the promoter of daylight saving time.
