= Westminster Cricket Club =

Historical English cricket team

Representing the City of Westminster, the original Westminster Cricket Club took part in known matches between 1735 and 1752. The team played its home matches at Tothill Fields.

== Bibliography ==
- Buckley, G. B. (1935). Fresh Light on 18th Century Cricket. Birmingham: Cotterell & Co. OCLC 23450280.
