= The Daylight Inn =

Pub in Petts Wood, Greater London

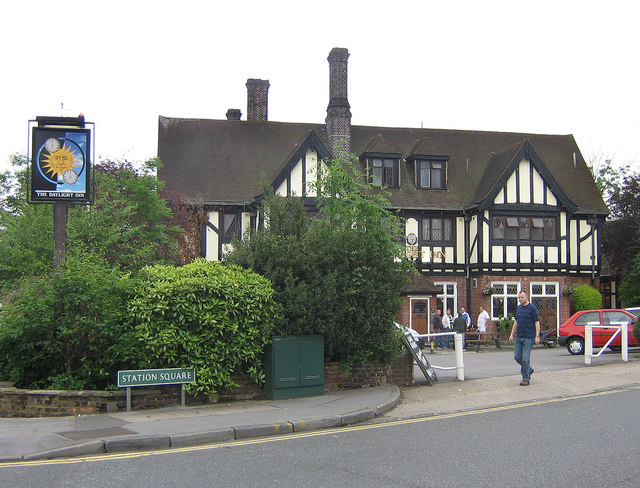
- The Daylight Inn, 2011

- Location within London Borough of Bromley Location within Greater London

General information
- Architectural style: Neo-Tudor
- Location: Petts Wood, Orpington, London Borough of Bromley UK
- Coordinates: 51.3893°N 0.0751°E
- Completed: 1935 (Extended 1996)

Design and construction
- Architect: Sidney Clark

Listed Building – Grade II
- Official name: The Daylight Inn, Petts Wood
- Designated: 16 July 2015
- Reference no.: 1427230

The Daylight Inn is a Grade II listed public house at Station Square, Petts Wood, Orpington, in the London Borough of Bromley.

It was built in 1935 for Charrington's Brewery, and designed by their chief architect Sidney Clark and is currently owned by Mitchells & Butlers.

The pub was named in honour of William Willett who came up with the idea of Daylight Saving and lived in Petts Wood. Long-standing legal restrictions meant that no other pub could be built within one mile. Until Wetherspoons opened The Sovereign of the Seas, Petts Wood only ever had one public house.

== As a venue ==
The Daylight has a large ground floor function room which was used as an amateur boxing show venue and also the executive HQ for Orpington & District ABC during the 1960s.

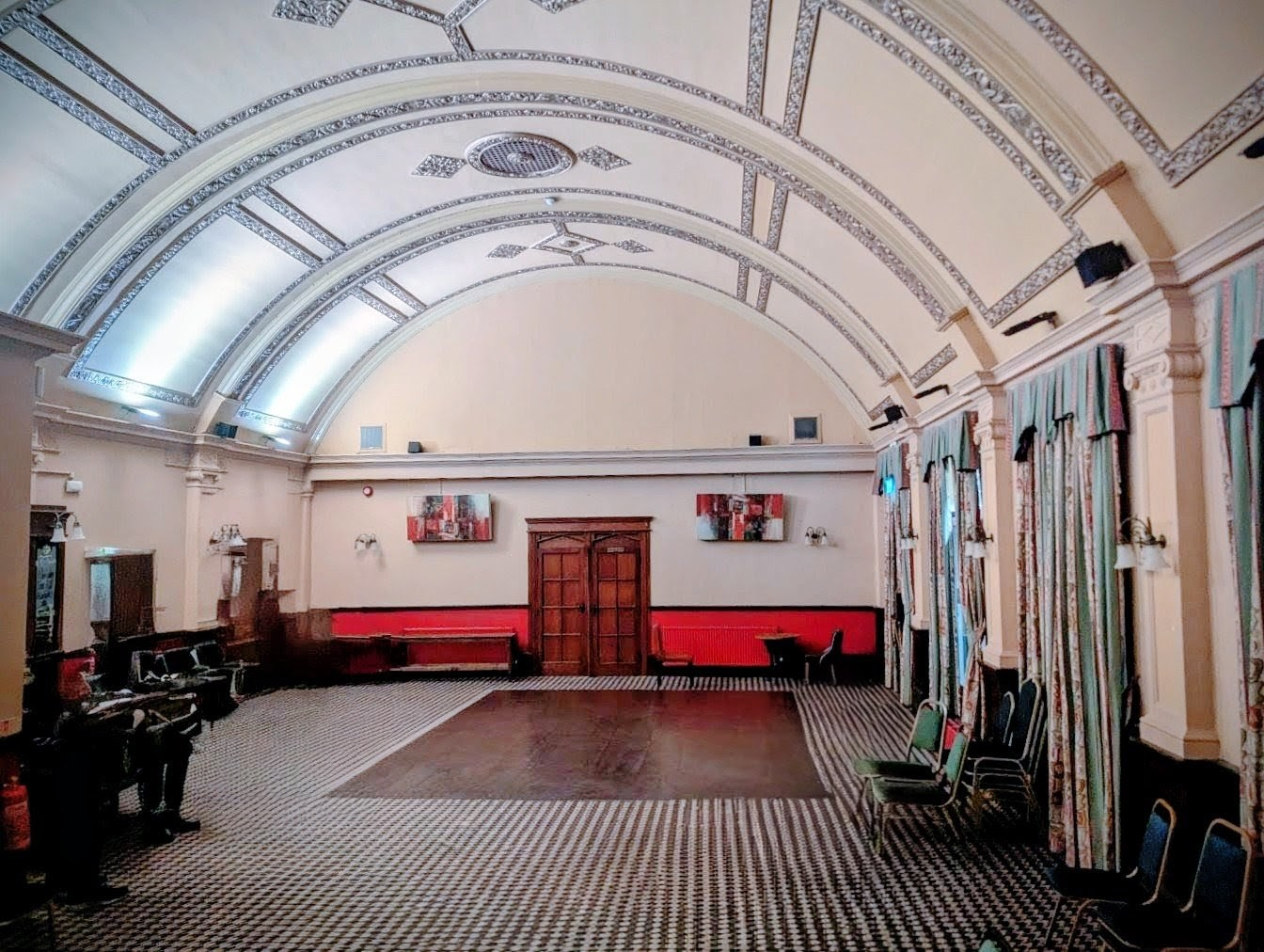
The "function room" of the Daylight Inn

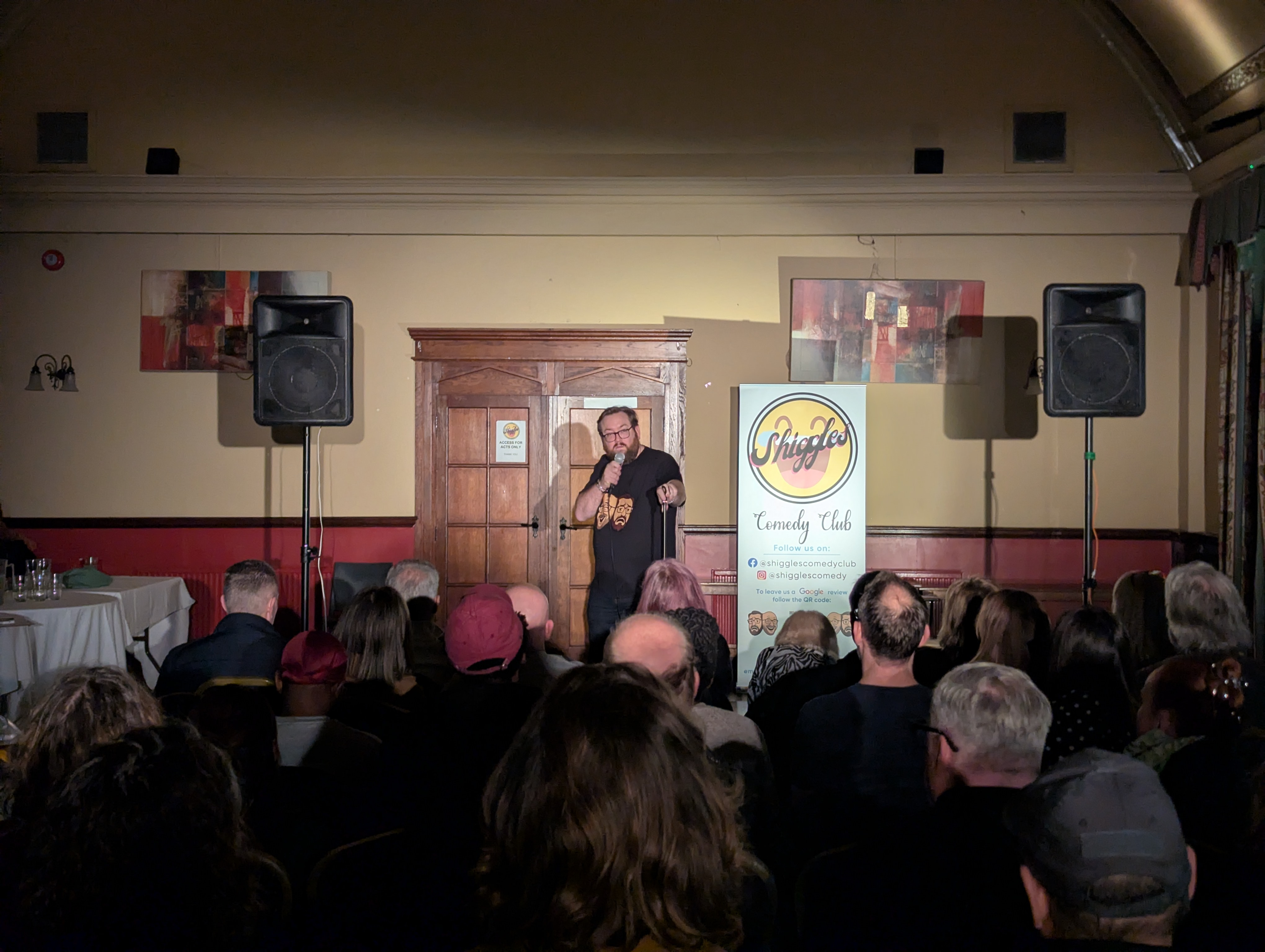
The "function room" of the Daylight Inn hosting a standup comedy night

Originally the room was a ballroom which had a stage and ornamental mirrors on the side wall that were covered with curtains that were pulled across during cards games played there during the week.

== Conservation ==
The pub has undergone several refurbishments over the years, the most notable being in 1996, when the two sides of the pub (saloon bar and restaurant) were knocked into one.

It was Grade II listed in 2015 by Historic England as part of a drive to protect some of the country's best interwar pubs. The citation draws attention to the quality of the building including its plasterwork and structural timber framing.
