= Southborough, Bromley =

Human settlement in Greater London, England

Coordinates: 51.3900°N 0.0445°E

Southborough
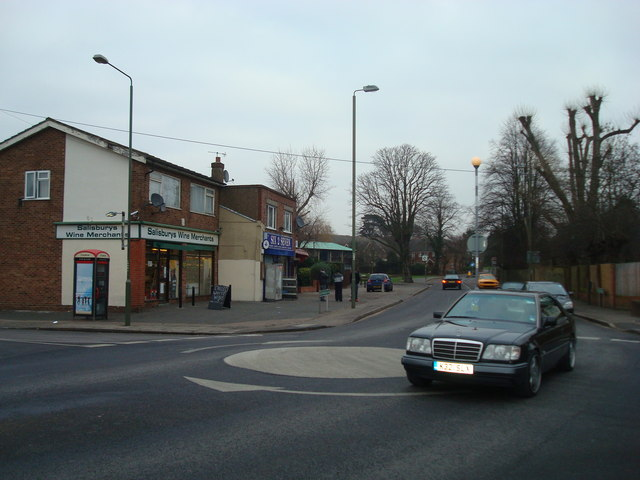

- Location within Greater London
- OS grid reference: TQ423676
- London borough: Bromley
- Ceremonial county: Greater London
- Region: London
- Country: England
- Sovereign state: United Kingdom
- Post town: BROMLEY
- Postcode district: BR2
- Dialling code: 020
- Police: Metropolitan
- Fire: London
- Ambulance: London
- UK Parliament: Bromley and Biggin Hill
- London Assembly: Bexley and Bromley

Southborough is an area of South East London, within the London Borough of Bromley, Greater London. Prior to 1965 it was within the historic county of Kent. It is located south of Bickley and Bromley, east of Bromley Common, north of Locksbottom, and west of Petts Wood.

== History ==
The area gets its name from South Barrow, a house that stood where Birdham Close now is in the 1600s. By the mid-19th century it remained a hamlet, with a few large houses and about 16 cottages. A description of Southborough is given in Charles Freeman's History, Antiquities, Improvements, &c. of the Parish of Bromley, Kent, published in 1832.

Southborough is situated from Bromley nearly two miles: it contains about sixteen houses, among which are the pleasant seats of Abraham Welland, Esq., the late Governor Cameron, and others. Some of the premises here, from their appearance, would indicate their erection to have taken place many years ago.

"Local tradition had it the hamlet had once been the court of a baron with the right to carry out executions, and that a gatehouse that had once stood on a farm there had been his prison. However John Dunkin, writing in 1815, believed that the fact that the Southborough had been part of a manor belonging to the Bishop of Rochester made the story "fabulous, or at least exaggerated by the mistakes of the ignorant rustics".

Further development occurred following the opening of Southborough Road train station in 1856, later renamed Bickley station. South Barrow went through a number of changes: it became Belmont School in 1901, Cloisters old people's home in 1922, and then later an office of the War Damage Commission, before being demolished in 1954. In 1977 Jubilee Country Park was opened to commemorate the Queen's Silver Jubilee.

== Amenities ==
The identity of the area has merged somewhat with the contiguous areas of Bromley Common, Bickley and Petts Wood. It is centred on Southborough Lane, which contains shops, two pubs (The Chequers and The Crooked Billet), a library and various places of worship.

== Gallery ==
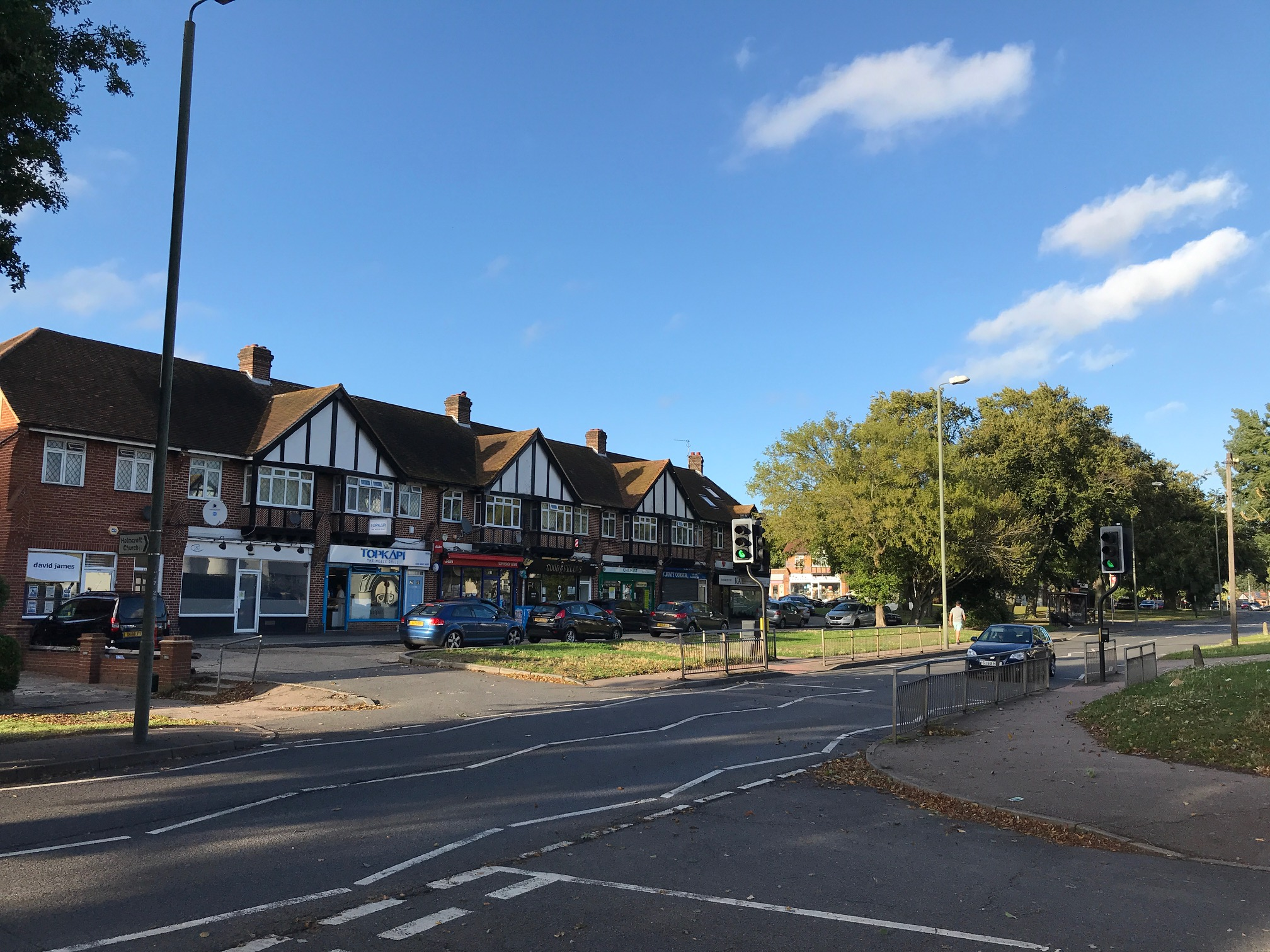
Shops on the Fairway/Southborough Lane junction

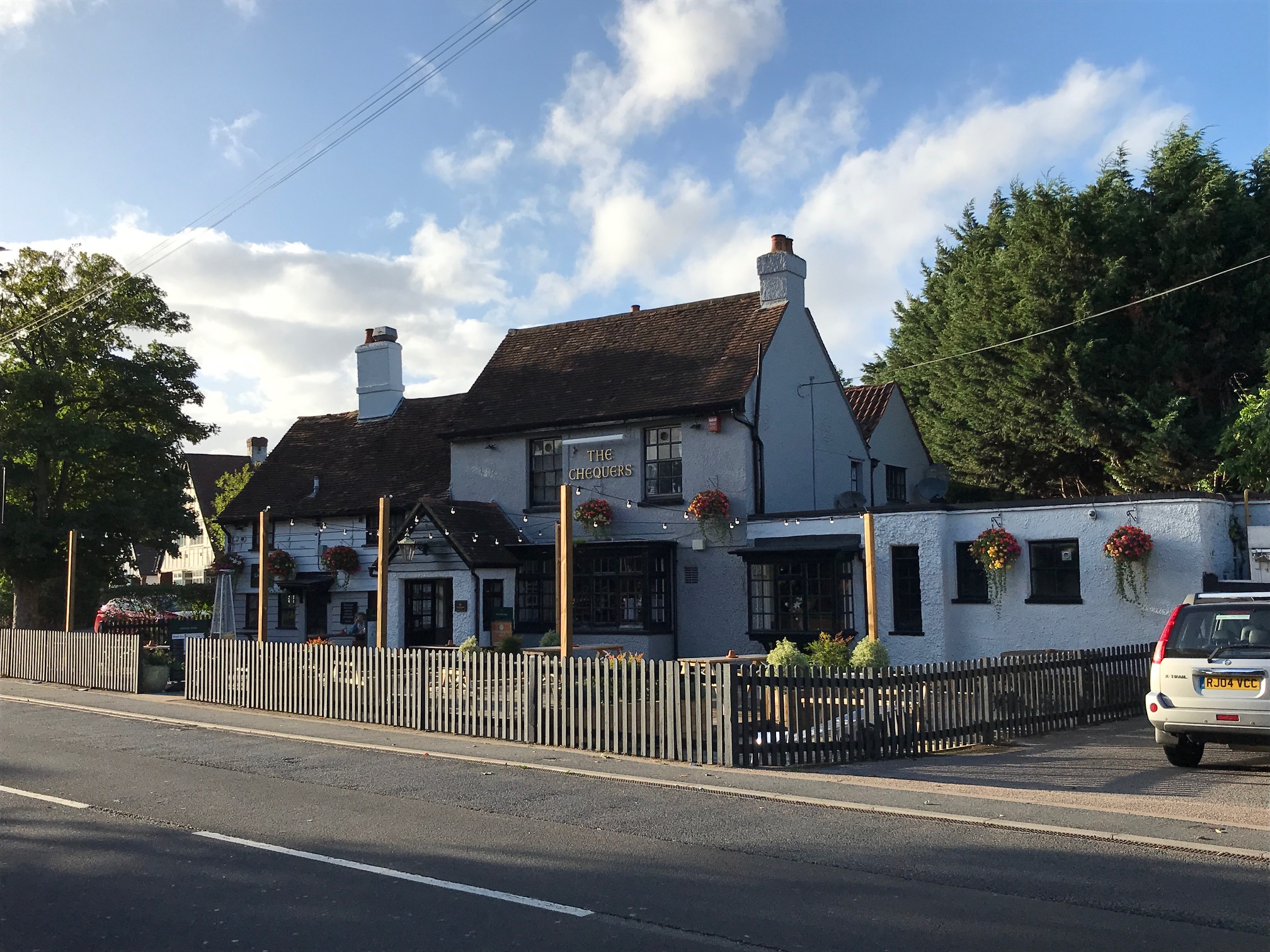
The Chequers pub, listed at grade II

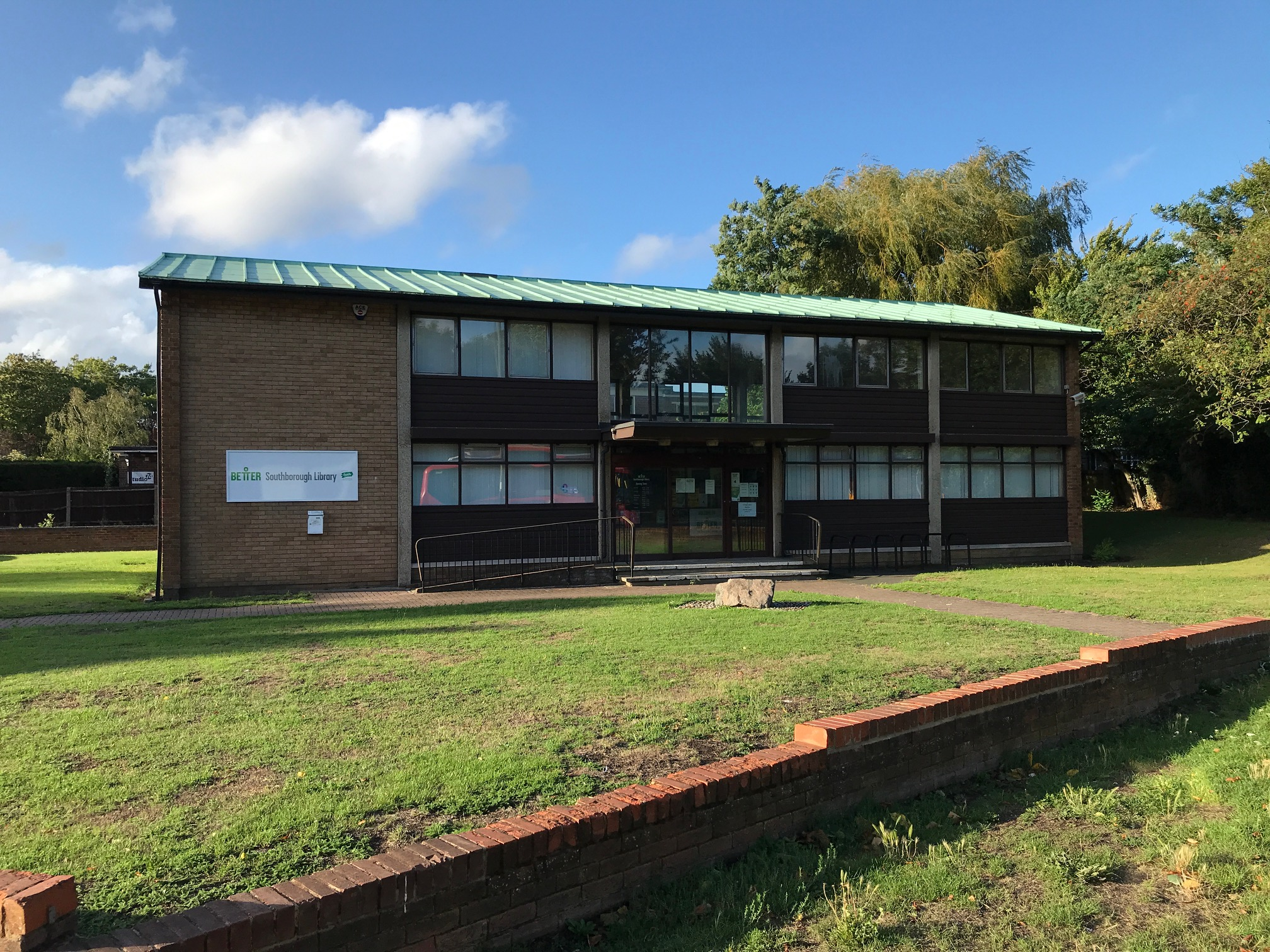
Southborough Library

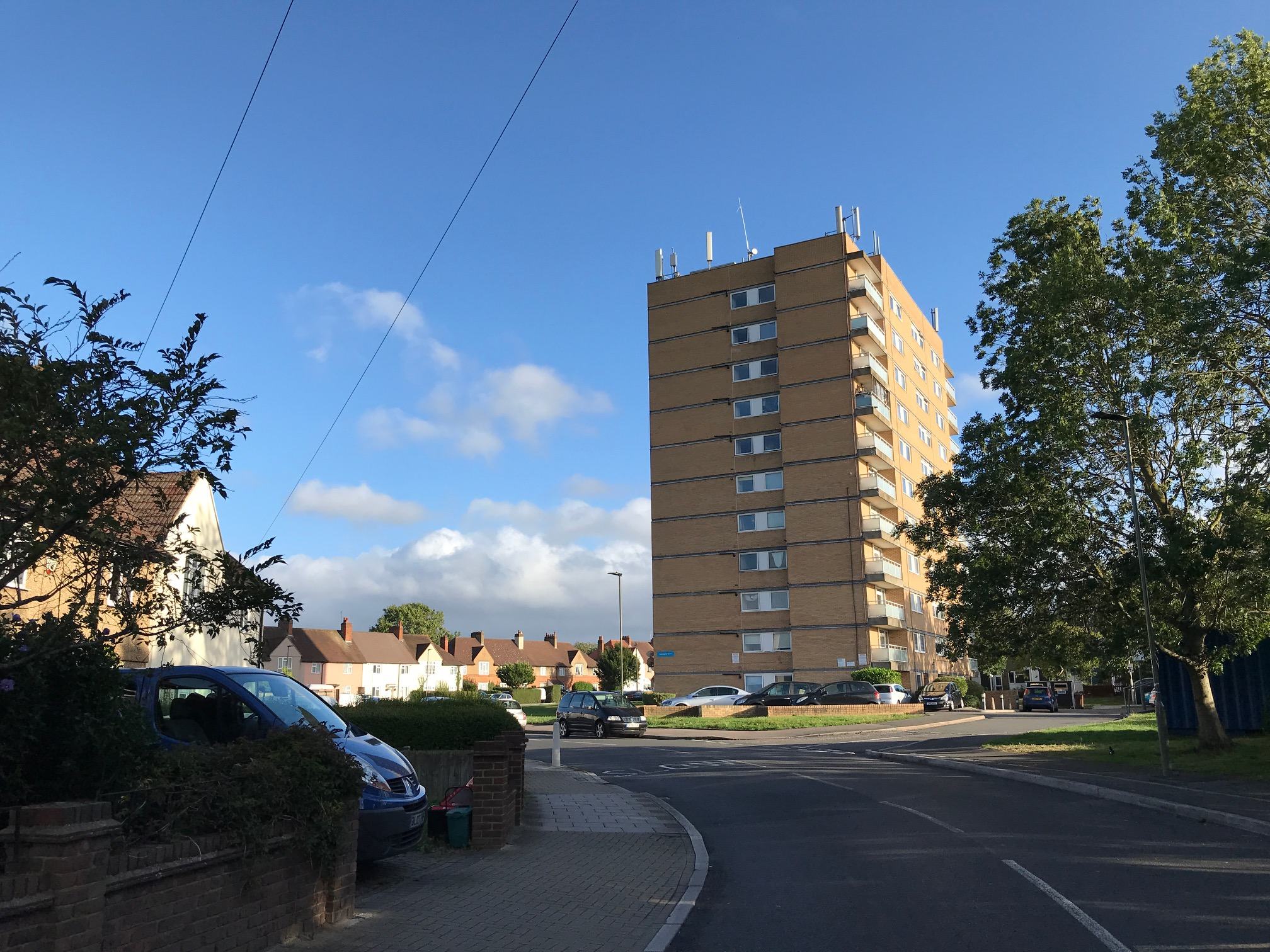
Flats on Turpington Lane

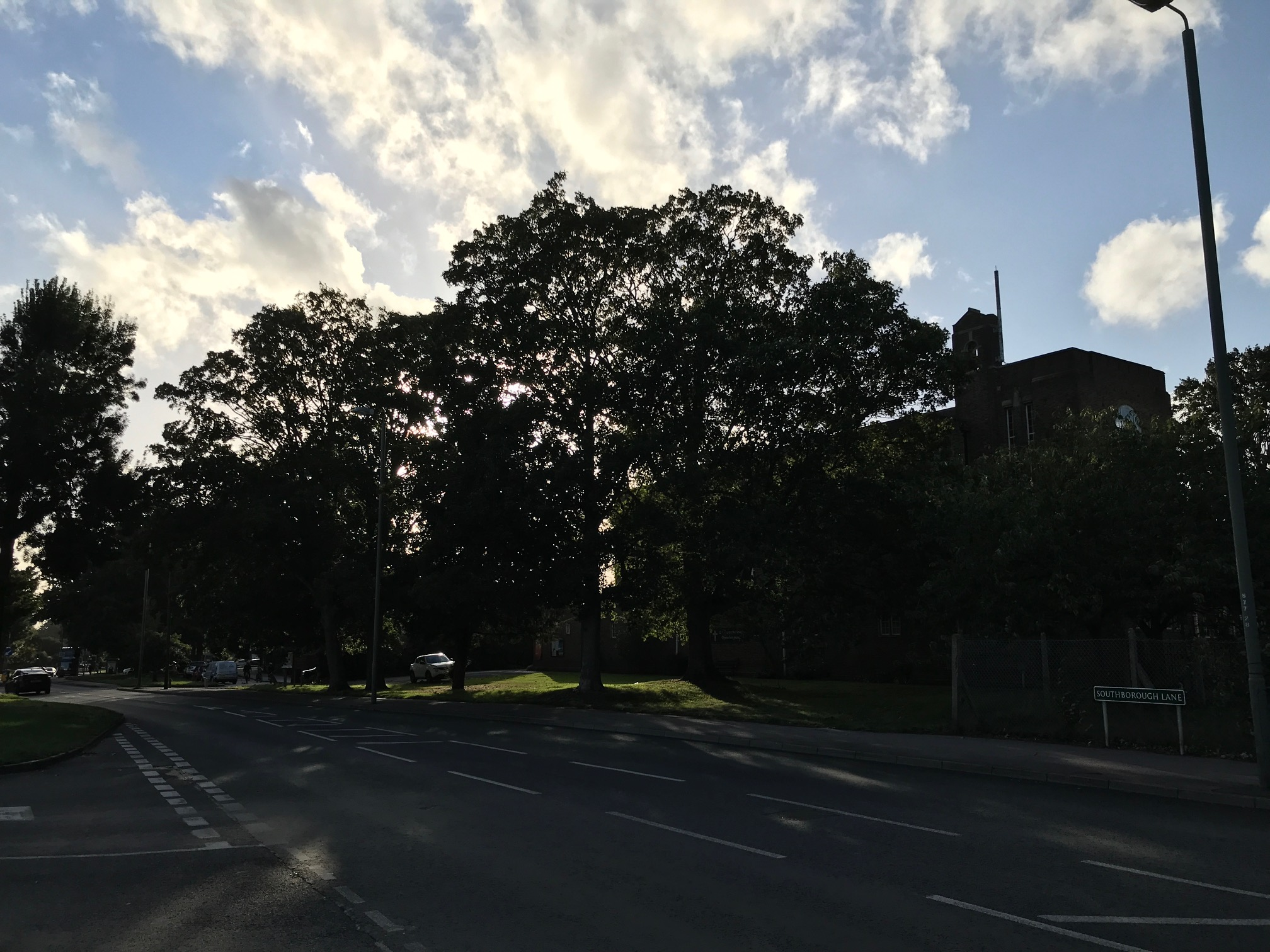
St Augustine's Church

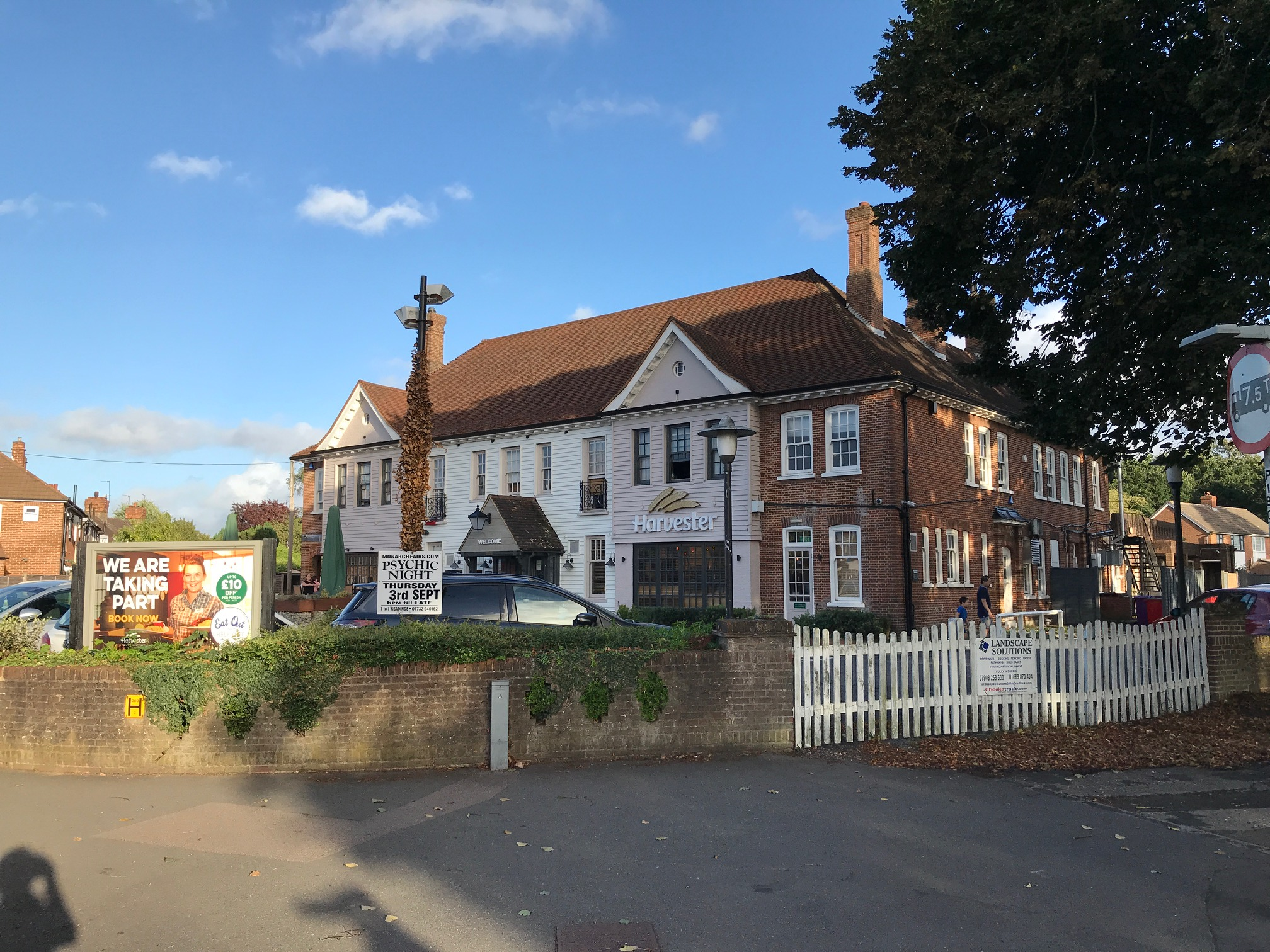
The Crooked Billet (Harvester) pub. The pub bears a plaque commemorating those who died when it was hit by a V2 rocket in 1944.
