= Sidney Clark =

British architect

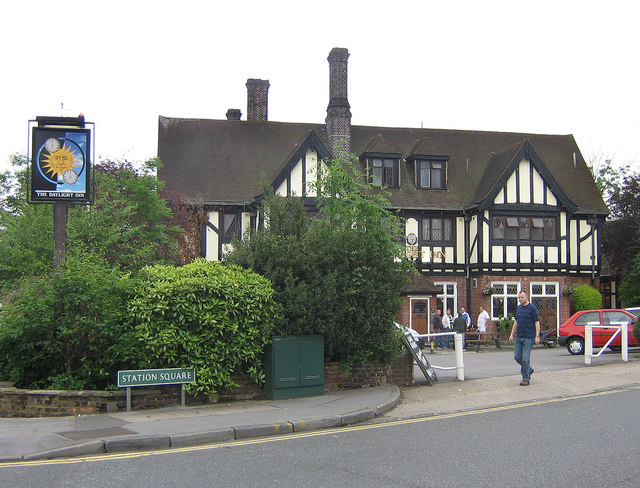
The Daylight Inn, 2011

Sidney Charles Clark (1894–1962) was a British architect, chief architect for Charrington's Brewery from 1924 to 1959.

== Early life ==
Sidney Charles Clark was born in 1894.

== Career ==
Clark was chief architect for Charrington's Brewery from 1924 to 1959.

He designed The Daylight Inn, a Grade II listed public house at Station Square, Petts Wood, Orpington, London, built in 1935 for Charrington's.

== Personal life ==
Clark died in 1962.
