= Bromley Common =

Coordinates: 51.3841°N 0.0349°E

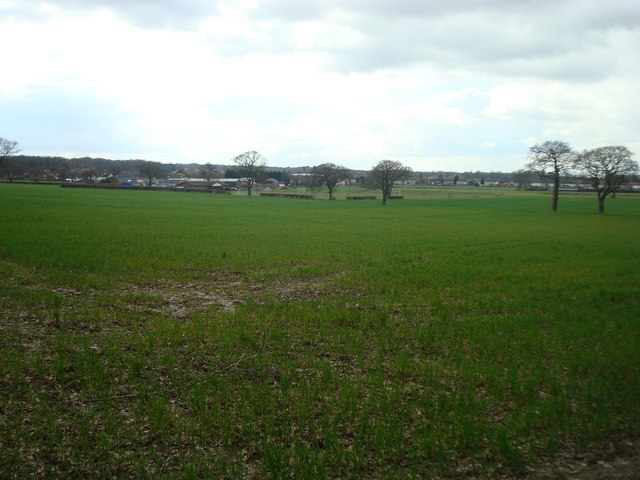

- Location within Greater London
- Population: 15,113 (2011 Census. Bromley Common and Keston Ward)
- OS grid reference: TQ416669
- London borough: Bromley
- Ceremonial county: Greater London
- Region: London
- Country: England
- Sovereign state: United Kingdom
- Post town: BROMLEY
- Postcode district: BR2
- Dialling code: 020
- Police: Metropolitan
- Fire: London
- Ambulance: London
- UK Parliament: Bromley and Biggin Hill
- London Assembly: Bexley and Bromley

Bromley Common is an unincorporated village in Greater London, within the London Borough of Bromley. Prior to 1965 it was within the historic county of Kent. It is south of Bromley town centre and Bickley, west of Southborough and Petts Wood, north of Locksbottom and Keston, and east of Hayes.

== Amenities ==
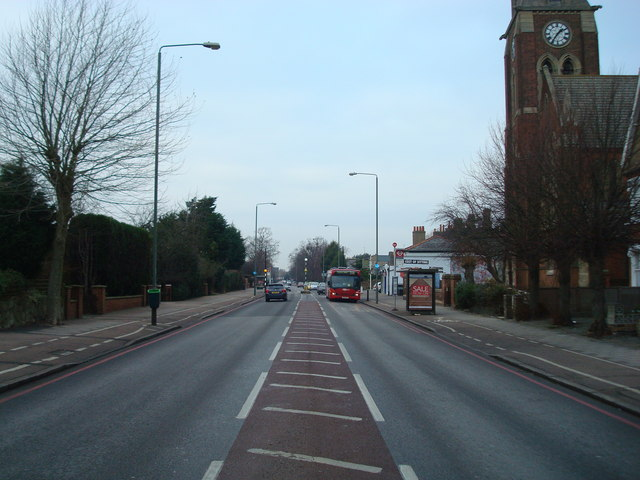
The A21

The area is centred on the road of the same name (part of the A21), stretching between Masons Hill at the south end of Bromley and Hastings Road, Locksbottom. Large-scale suburban development means that the area now merges into Southborough and Bickley. The main shopping and leisure area of the district is Chatterton Road, which has a number of popular restaurants, delicatessens, hair and beauty salons, and a range of hobby/craft and charity shops. The Chatterton Arms pub, which opened around 1870, was originally named the "Hit or Miss", presumably a reference to "Shooting Common", dating back to the 'dark' days of highwaymen. It was later renamed in honour of the 18th-century poet, Thomas Chatterton. There are other pubs spread out over the area: The Bricklayers Arms on Masons Hill, a Toby Carvery at the junction of Bromley Common with Victoria Road, and the Lord Holmesdale on Homesdale Road. Havelock Recreation Ground, a slightly smaller park, lies a short distance to the north.

The area has been awarded village status by the local authority and is known as Chatterton Village. Recent improvements include flower boxes, a village sign, Victorian-style lamp posts and a village notice board outside the bakery. The nearby Whitehall Recreation Ground has also been enhanced by the Friends of Whitehall Recreation Ground, with help from Bromley Council's Parks Department, with flower beds, seating, a picnic area, a wildlife pond, a refurbished children's play area, a hand-carved wooden bench, and outdoor gym equipment (which was funded by the Friends of Whitehall Recreation Ground).

== History ==
A hamlet was present here by the 1500s. Until the 1860s, Bromley Common consisted mainly of farmland and the estates of a few large landowners. The common itself was owned by the Bishops of Rochester as Lords of the Manor, but on the condition that various ‘commoners’ should be allowed to freely enjoy their privileges on it. It amounted to about 300 acres, extending irregularly along the sides of the road that formed the main route from Tunbridge Wells and Hastings to Bromley and, beyond, to London. It was a well-known and profitable haunt for highwaymen. After the common was enclosed by Act of Parliament in 1826 (the act was passed in 1821), there was some limited residential development, but this was mostly to the south of the old common, where it fanned out from the main road. A substantial number of homes had been built around Oakley Road and Princes Plain, such that in 1842 Holy Trinity Church, at the junction of Bromley Common and Oakley Road, was built to cater for the expanding population. In the northern section of the old common development was much more modest, with just a few dozen homes put up along the east side of the road.

At the heart of what is now Chatterton Village stood the grounds of Bromley Villa (later renamed Walpole Lodge), a large house owned by gentryman landowner Henry Hebbert. It was his death in 1864, and the subsequent auction of Bromley Villa, that presaged the residential development out of which Chatterton Road was built. This first tranche of development to the east of Bromley Common stretched from Chantry Lane to Johnson Road, between which lay Pope Road and Walpole Road; connecting these roads and running parallel to Bromley Common was Chatterton Road. Only in the late 1870s did the area just to the north – including Bloomfield, Addison and Cowper roads – begin to be developed. The development to the south – of Mosslea, Balfour, Albert, Victoria and Salisbury roads and Crown Lane – began around the turn of the 20th century.

Further development occurred in the 20th century, with Bromley Bus Garage opening here in 1924. The area to the west, formerly home to a house called The Rookery which later burnt down, was maintained as open space by green belt legislation. Part of the site was however set aside for the building of Bromley College in 1965.

== Cricket venue ==
The first definite mention of the Bromley area in a cricket connection is a 1735 match on Bromley Common between Kent and London. The common was used for matches on at least 12 occasions between 1735 and 1752, a period which coincided with Bromley Cricket Club having one of the strongest teams in England during the career of Robert Colchin. The last historic match known to have been played there was between Bromley and London on 30 June 1752. Cricket has been played on the common in recent years.

== Notable people ==
- David Bowie (1947–2016), musician, lived at 23 Clarence Road from 1954 to 1955.
- Richmal Crompton (1890–1969), author of the Just William books, lived at 9 Cherry Orchard Road, later moving to 'The Glebe' on Oakley Road.
- John Evelyn (1620–1706), diarist, was robbed on the Common by highwaymen in 1652.
- Major-General Charles W. Norman (1891–1974), British Army officer.

== Gallery ==
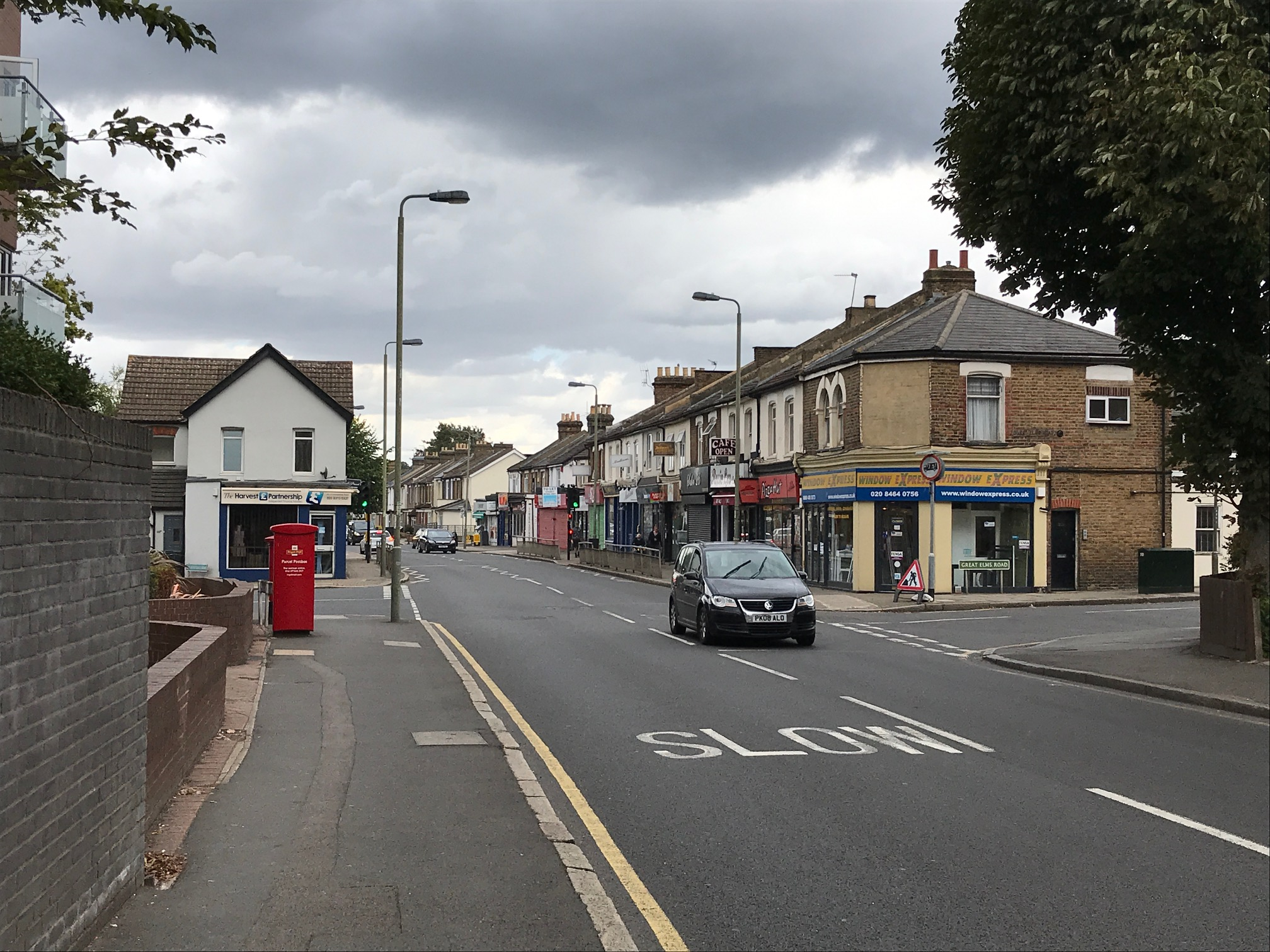
Shops on the western end of Homesdale Road

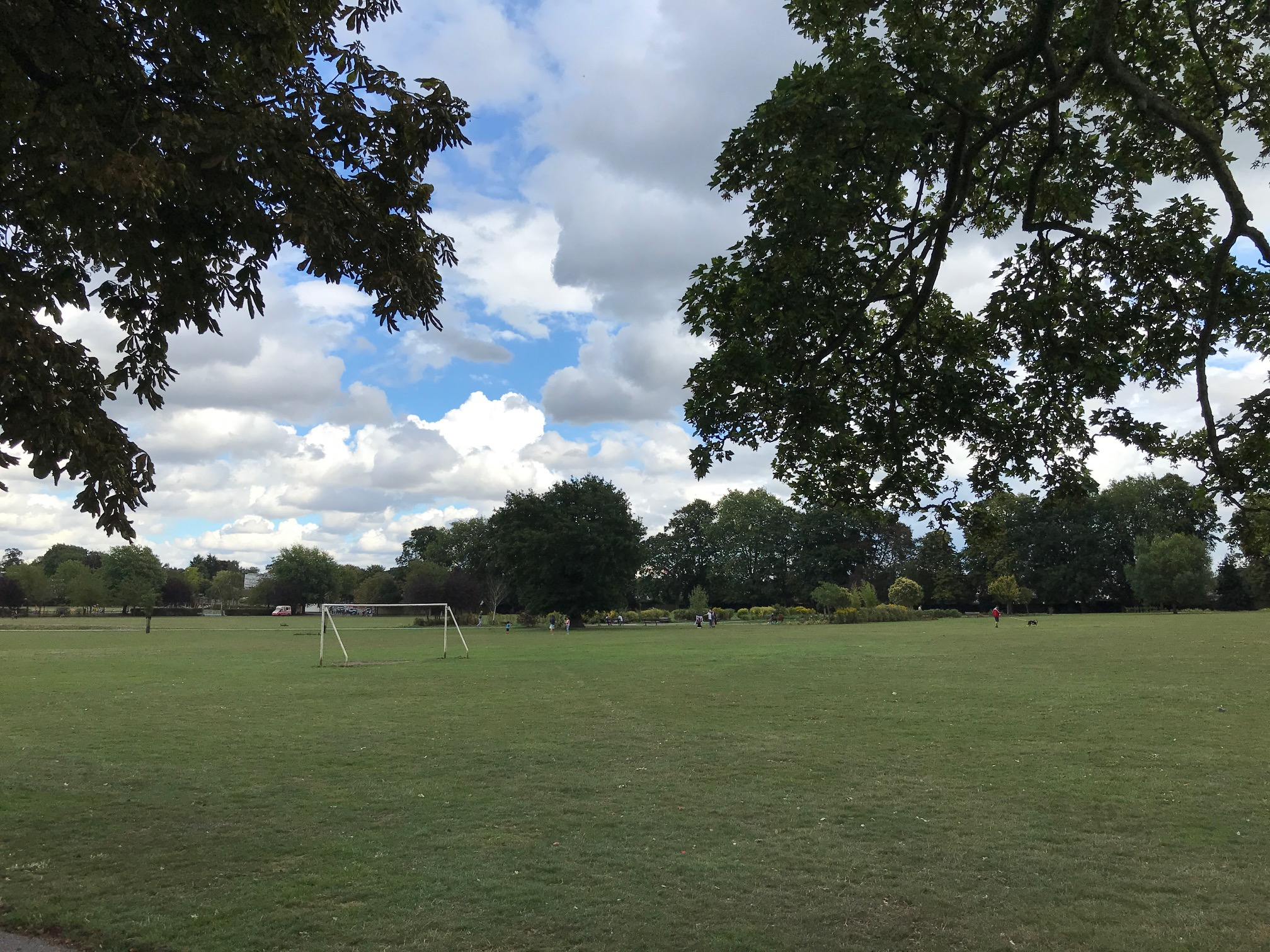
Whitehall Recreation Ground

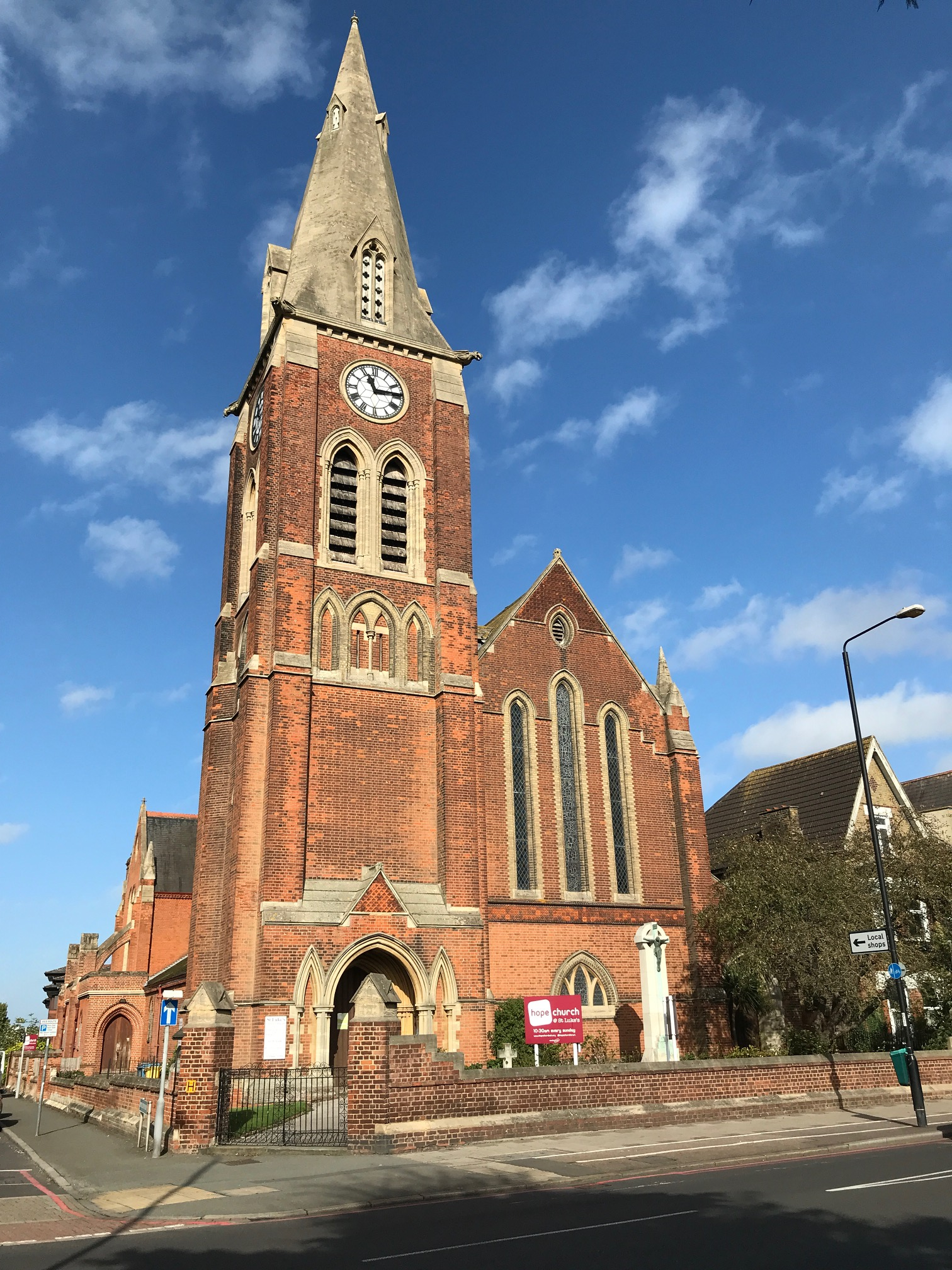
St Luke's Church, Bromley Common

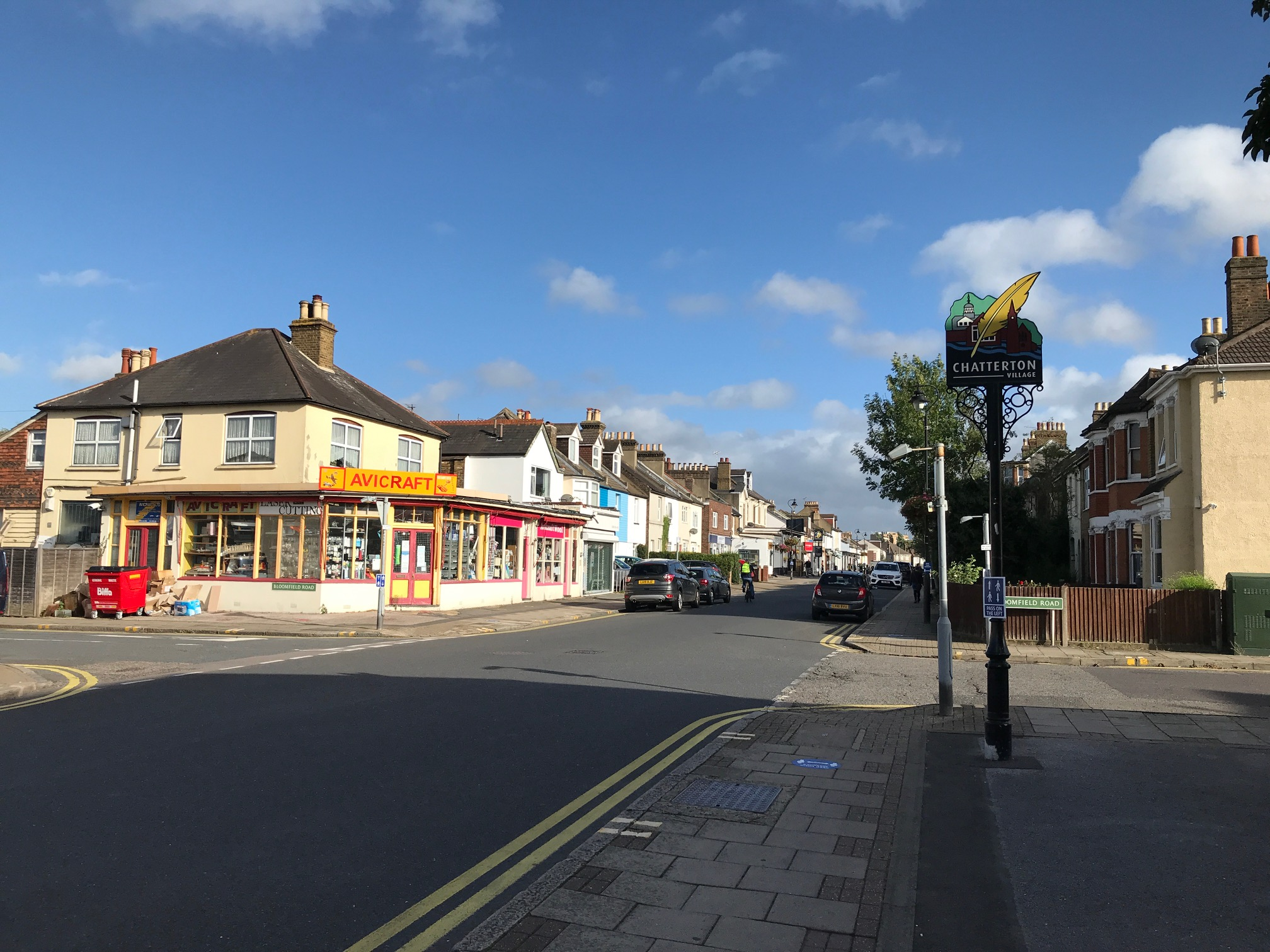
Chatterton Road

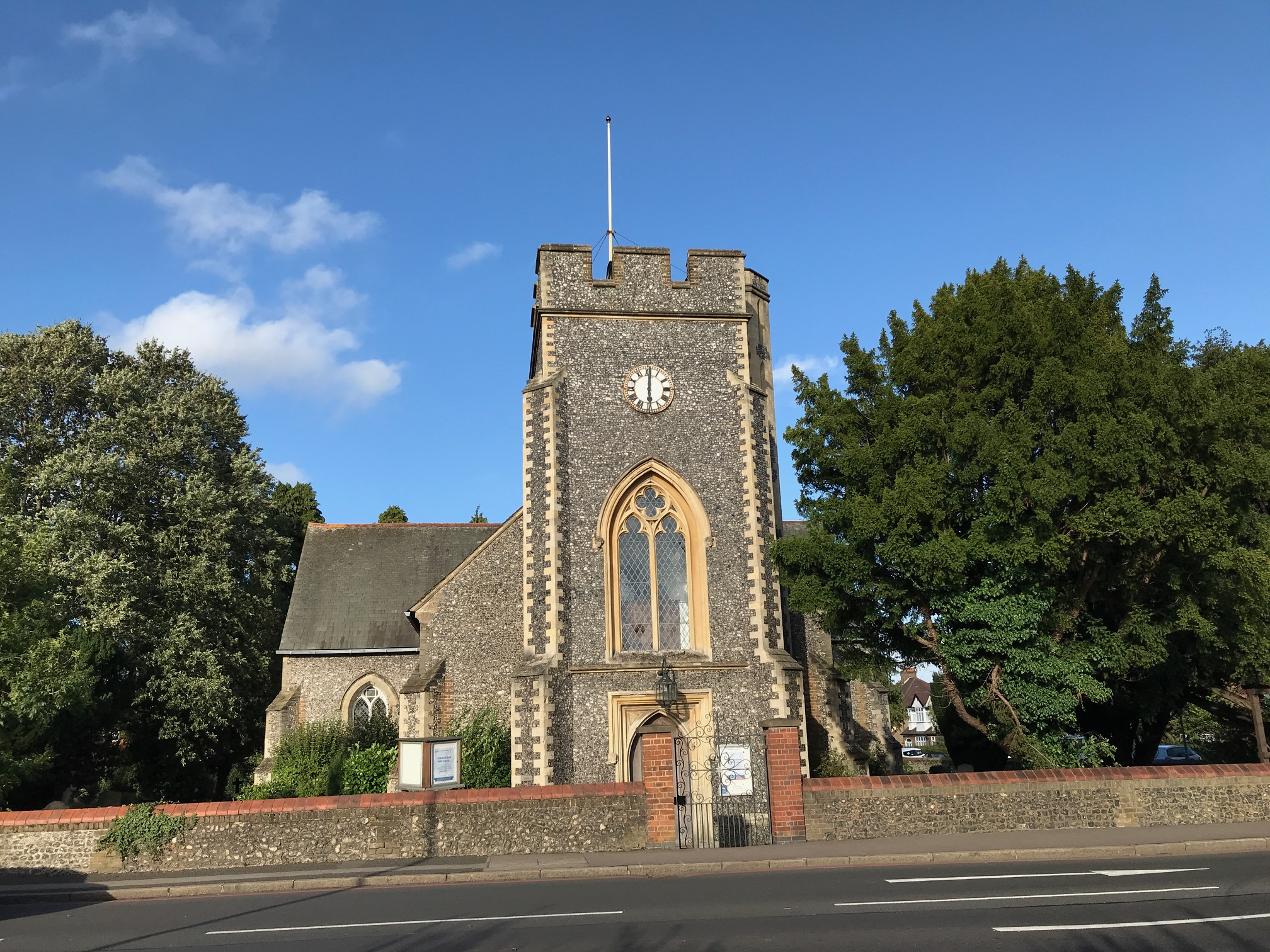
Holy Trinity Church, Bromley Common

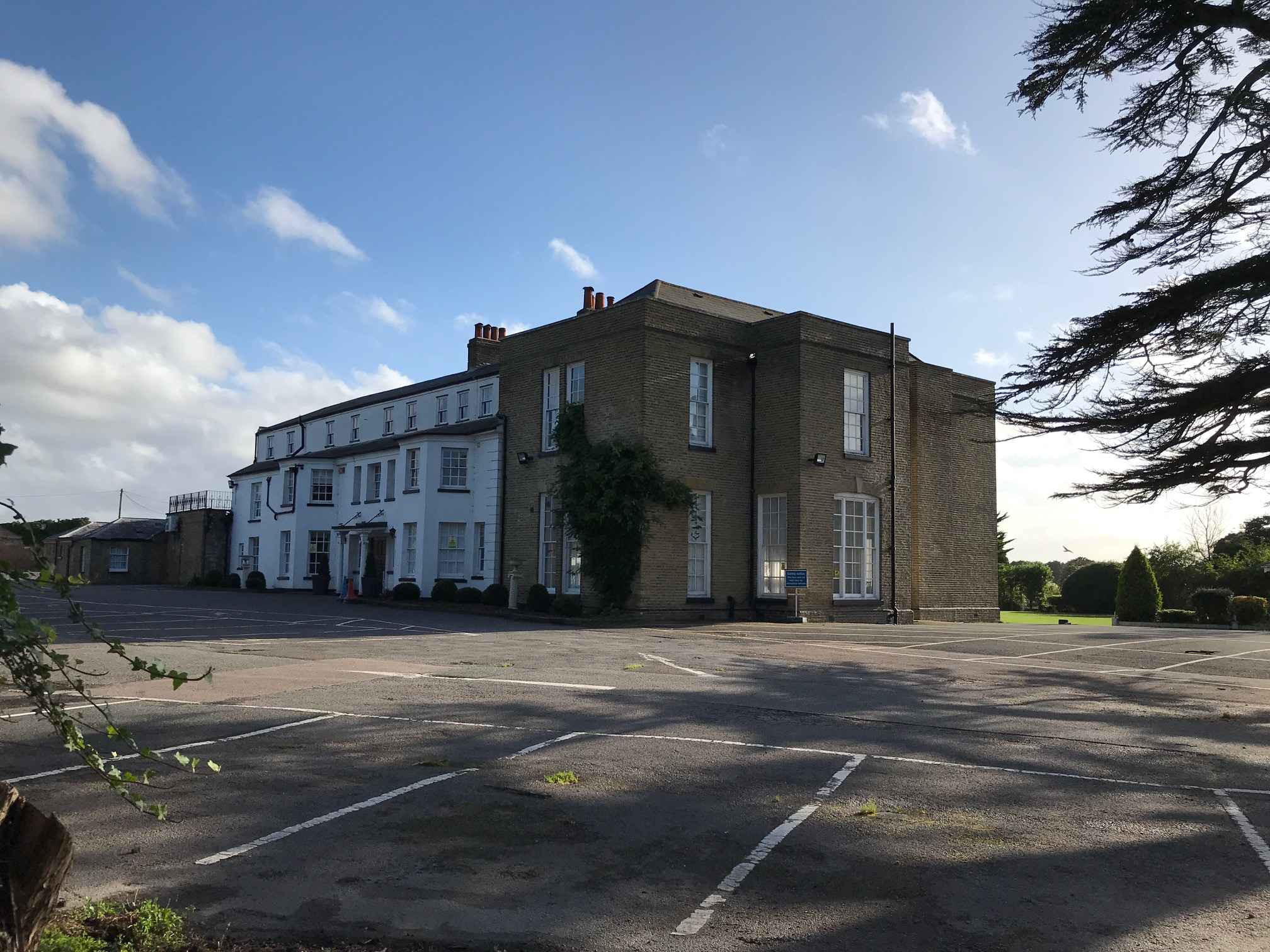
Oakley House
