= Petts Wood =

Town in London, England

Coordinates: 51.3885°N 0.0760°E

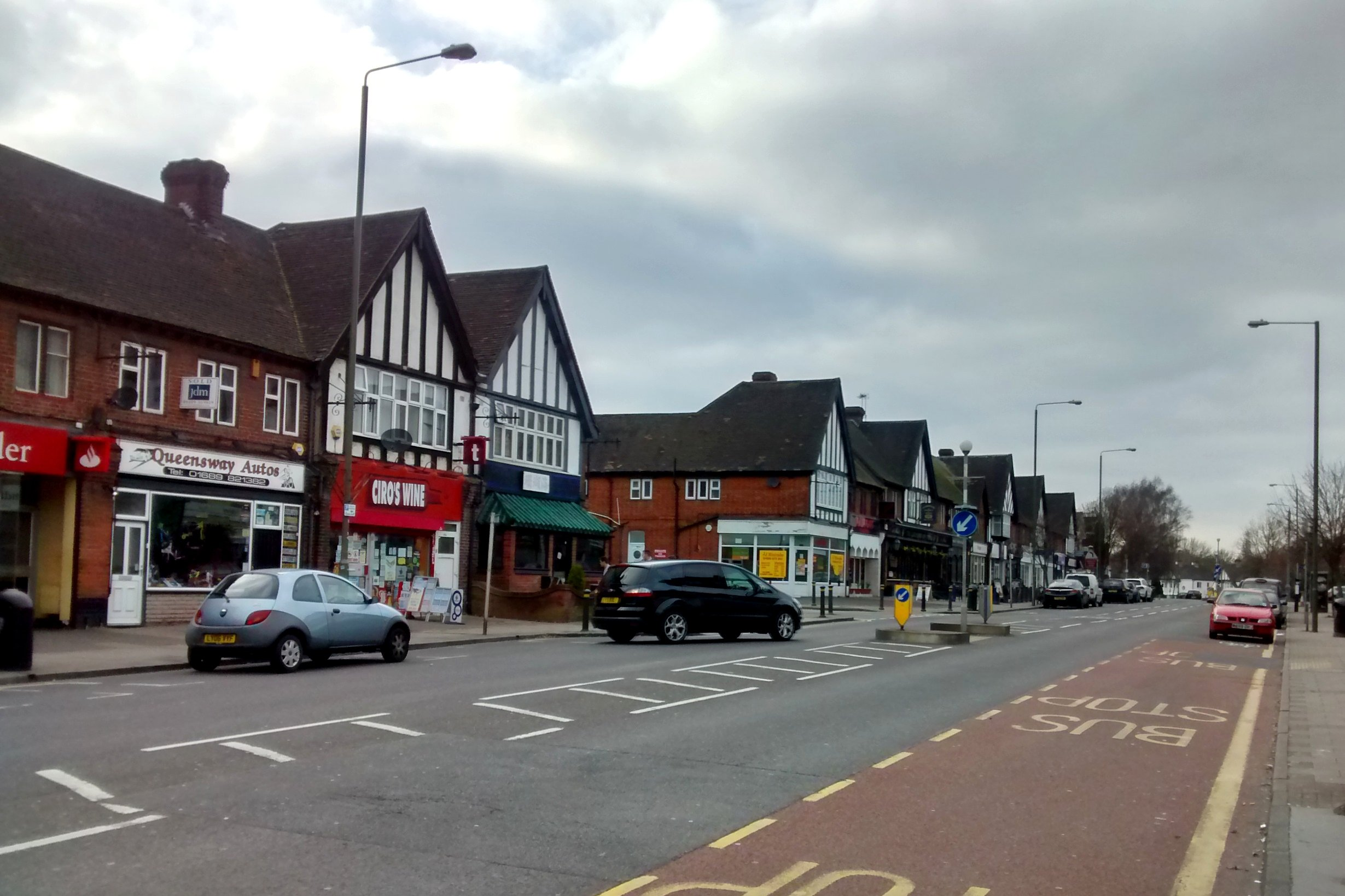

- Location within Greater London
- Population: 13,651 (2011 Census. Petts Wood and Knoll Ward)
- OS grid reference: TQ445675
- London borough: Bromley
- Ceremonial county: Greater London
- Region: London
- Country: England
- Sovereign state: United Kingdom
- Post town: ORPINGTON
- Postcode district: BR5
- Dialling code: 01689
- Police: Metropolitan
- Fire: London
- Ambulance: London
- UK Parliament: Orpington
- London Assembly: Bexley and Bromley

Petts Wood is a town in south-east London, England, previously located in the historic county of Kent. It lies south of Chislehurst, west of St Paul's Cray and Poverest, north of Orpington and Crofton, and east of Southborough and Bromley Common. The area forms part of the London Borough of Bromley local authority district in the ceremonial county of Greater London.

== History ==
The name appeared first in 1577 as "the wood of the Pett family", who were shipbuilders and leased the wood as a source of timber. (A pub, The Sovereign of the Seas, is named after a ship built at Woolwich to a design by Phineas Pett.)

The area remained rural right up until the late 19th century; in 1872 just one house ('Ladywood') stood here. Most of the modern suburb of Petts Wood was built in the late 1920s by the Harlow-based developer Basil Scruby together with architect Leonard Culliford who designed the layout of the roads. A number of individual builders developed individual plots, amongst others the master builder, Noel Rees, as well as Walter Reed and George Hoad. Scruby also paid the Southern Railway Company £6,000 to build Petts Wood railway station to serve the new suburb. Shops and a cinema were also built adjacent to the railway.

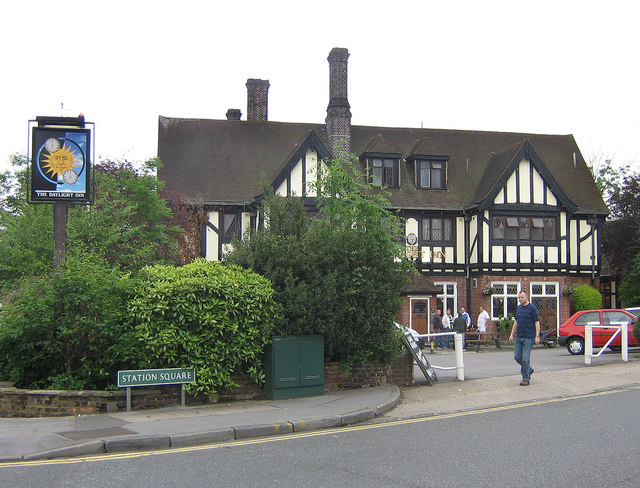
The Daylight Inn in 2011. The pub is listed at grade II and has a function room that originally a Ballroom.

The generally higher quality of large homes built to the east of the railway line, as compared to smaller and more densely packed development to the west, was due to the fact that Scruby's increasing financial difficulties meant he had little control over its developers, Morrell's and New Ideal Homesteads.

The area between Petts Wood and Bickley sustained heavy bombing during the Second World War because of its proximity to an important railway junction. Three bombs landed on the town centre itself.

The Jubilee Country Park is to the northwest of the main shopping area. Before this park was created in 1977 the area was known as 'The Gun Sites', as it had been the location for anti-aircraft guns in the Second World War, and was the home of the 1st Petts Wood scout group.

According to Keith Waterhouse in his book Streets Ahead, Petts Wood was popular with Fleet Street newspaper staff in the 1950s: "… this Kent suburb, recommended in Fleet Street for the all-night train service it afforded sub-editors and reporters coming off late duty, thus giving them a round-the-clock, heaven-sent excuse for one more for the road."

In 2009, the local Woolworths store gained media attention when its manager, realising his was the last of the chain to close, gathered the remains of the pick and mix section and auctioned the bag of sweets for £14,500.

== Governance ==
Petts Wood is part of the Orpington constituency for elections to the House of Commons.

Petts Wood is part of the Petts Wood and Knoll ward for elections to Bromley London Borough Council.

== The woods ==
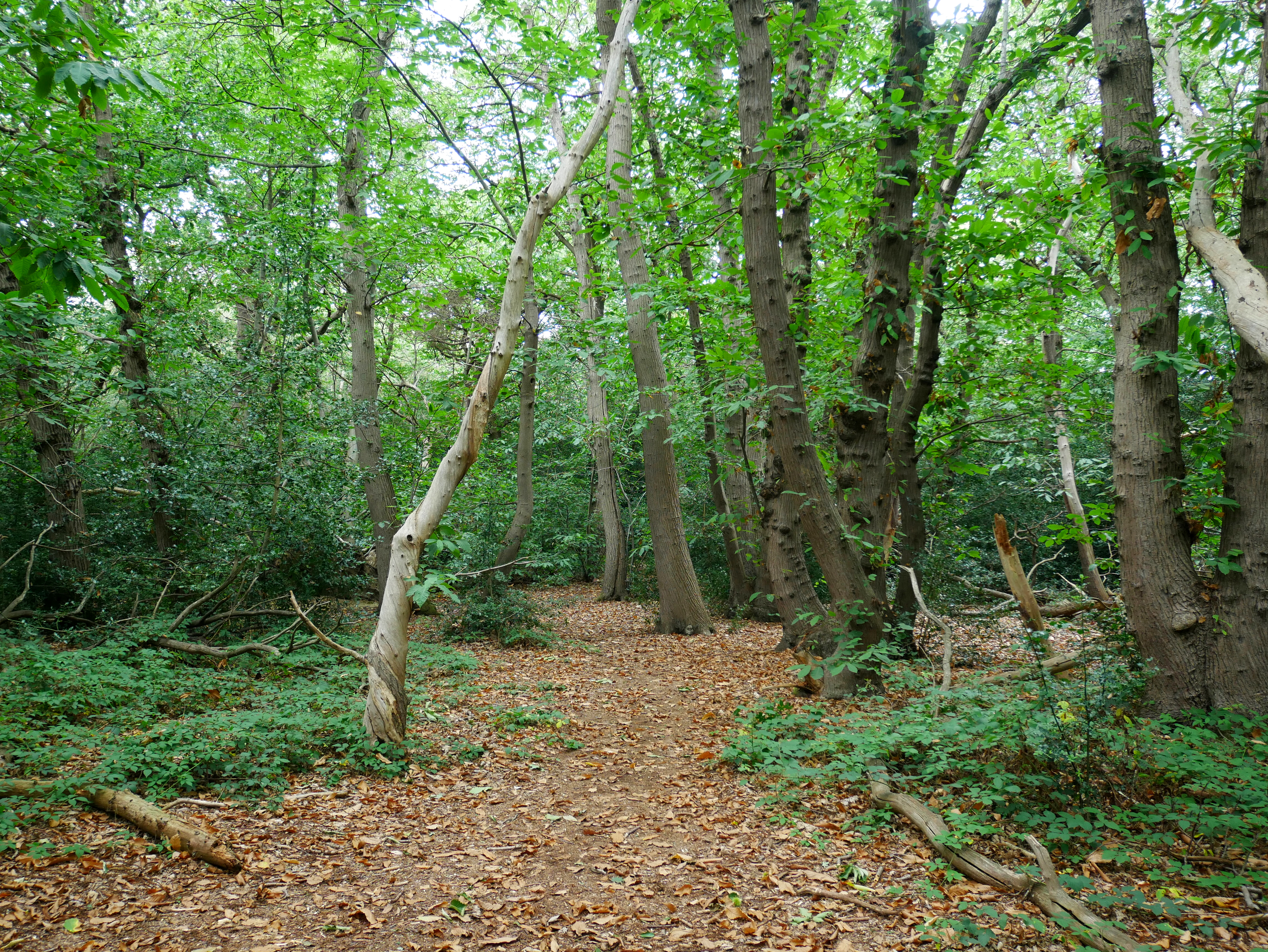
The Petts Wood area of woodland

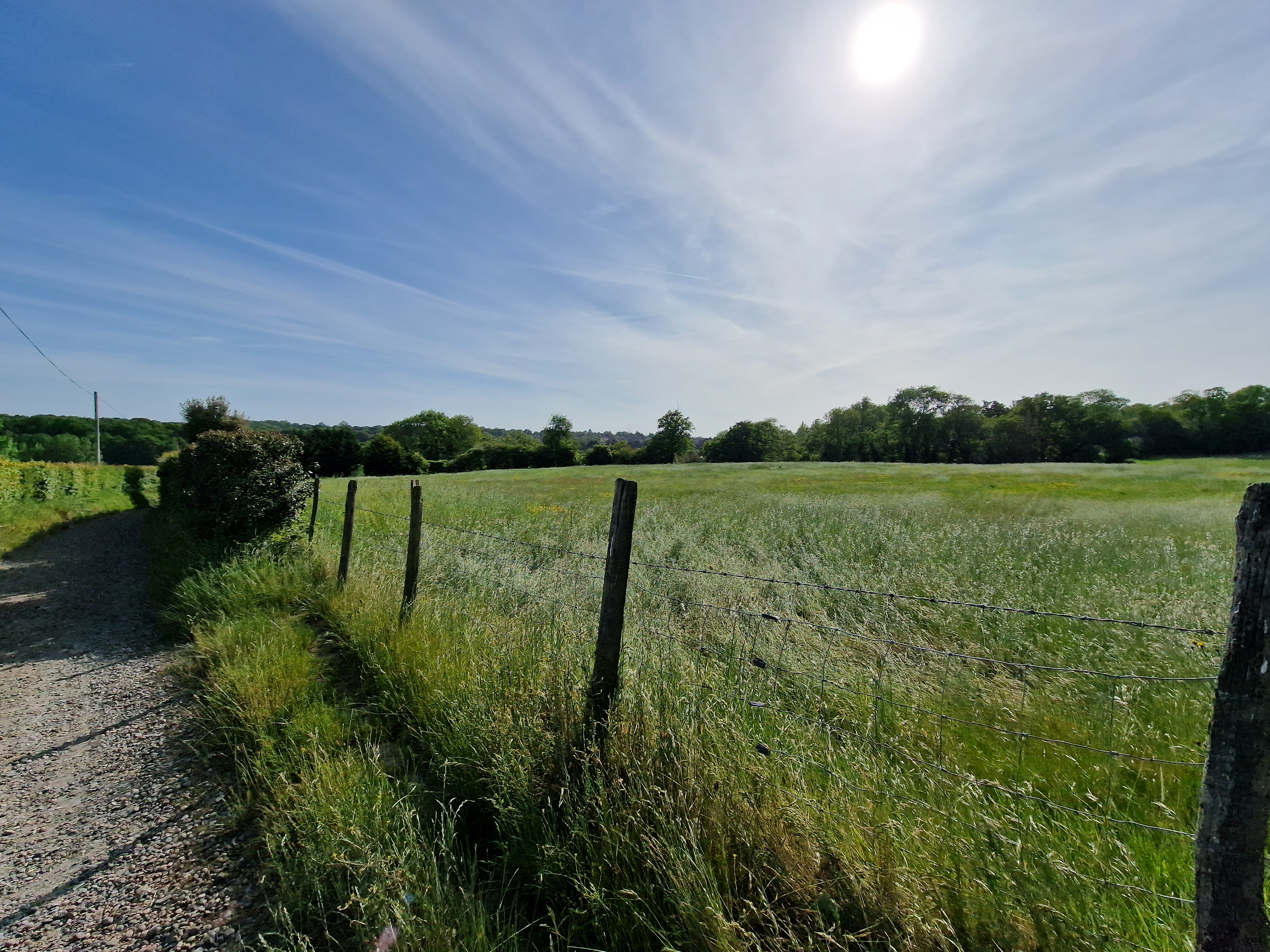
Open fields on the Hawkwood Estate

The eponymous wood itself survives and is managed by the National Trust. Originally just 88 acres (36 hectares) were bought by public subscription and donated to the Trust in 1927, after it became clear that the area would be developed for housing. This asset expanded when the neighbouring Hawkwood Estate and Edlmann Wood, comprising a further 250 acres (100 hectares), were donated to the Trust by landowners Robert and Francesca Hall in 1957. The woodland features oak, birch, rowan, alder, ash, hornbeam and sweet chestnut.

== Transport ==
=== Rail ===
Petts Wood station provides the area with National Rail services to London Victoria via Bromley South and Herne Hill, Kentish Town via Bromley South and Catford, London Charing Cross via Grove Park, London Cannon Street via Grove Park and Lewisham, Orpington and Sevenoaks.

=== Buses ===
Petts Wood is served by London Buses routes 208, 273, N199, R3 and R7. These connect it with areas including Bromley, Catford, Chislehurst, Grove Park, Lewisham and Orpington.

== Notable people ==
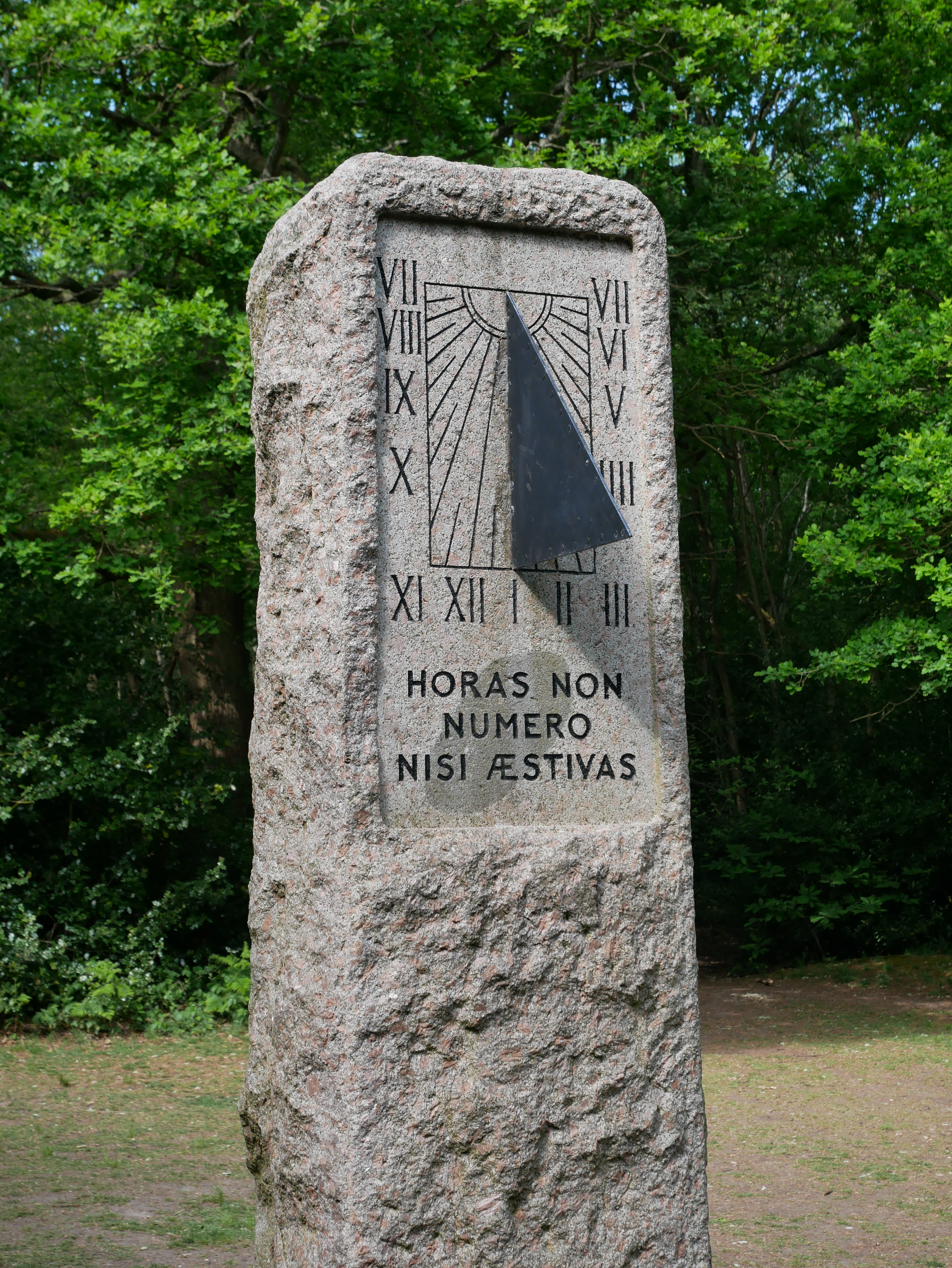
The sundial that memorialises William Willett in the woodland at Petts Wood

- Cerrie Burnell (b. 1979) – actress, singer, playwright, and television presenter, grew up in Petts Wood.
- Jack Dee (b. 1961) – comedian and winner of Celebrity Big Brother 1, grew up in Petts Wood.
- Charles De Gaulle (1890–1970) – French general, statesman and future President of France who led the Free French Forces during Second World War. He rented a home at 41 Birchwood Road for four months before moving his family further inland to Dudleston Heath in Shropshire later in 1940.
- Sir Geraint Evans (1922–1992) – Welsh baritone or bass-baritone noted for his operatic roles. Lived at 34 Birchwood Road where he is commemorated with a blue plaque.
- David Fletcher (b. 1942) – MBE, Military historian and author, born in Petts Wood.
- Pat Keysell (1926–2009) – TV presenter and sign language interpreter, grew up in Petts Wood.
- Pixie Lott (b. 1991) – singer and songwriter.
- Ian Mortimer (b. 1967) – medieval historian, grew up in Petts Wood.
- David Nobbs (1935–2015) – comedy writer and the creator of the sitcom The Fall and Rise of Reginald Perrin, grew up in Petts Wood.
- Major Phil Packer (b. 1972) – British soldier who was rendered paraplegic in 2008 by injuries sustained while serving in Iraq, grew up in Petts Wood. He has since raised over a million pounds through charitable fundraising efforts which have garnered him several national awards.
- Arthur Seldon (1916–2005) – economist.
- Ivor Spencer (1924–2009) – toastmaster and promoter of the butler arts.
- Sir Thomas Spencer (1882-1976), managing director of Standard Telephones and Cables, and his wife Lady Spencer (née the composer Ethel Edith Bilsland), lived in Tudor House. She continued to live there after his death and died in 1982.
- William Willett (1856–1915) – promoter of Daylight Saving Time, an idea he is thought to have come up with whilst riding in Petts Wood. He is commemorated by a memorial sundial in the wood, and the pub The Daylight Inn is named in his honour.

== In popular culture ==
Birchwood Road, Kingsway, and other surrounding roads, were used as a location for the 1978 feature film, Give Us Tomorrow, with Sylvia Syms.
