= Tothill Fields =

Area of London

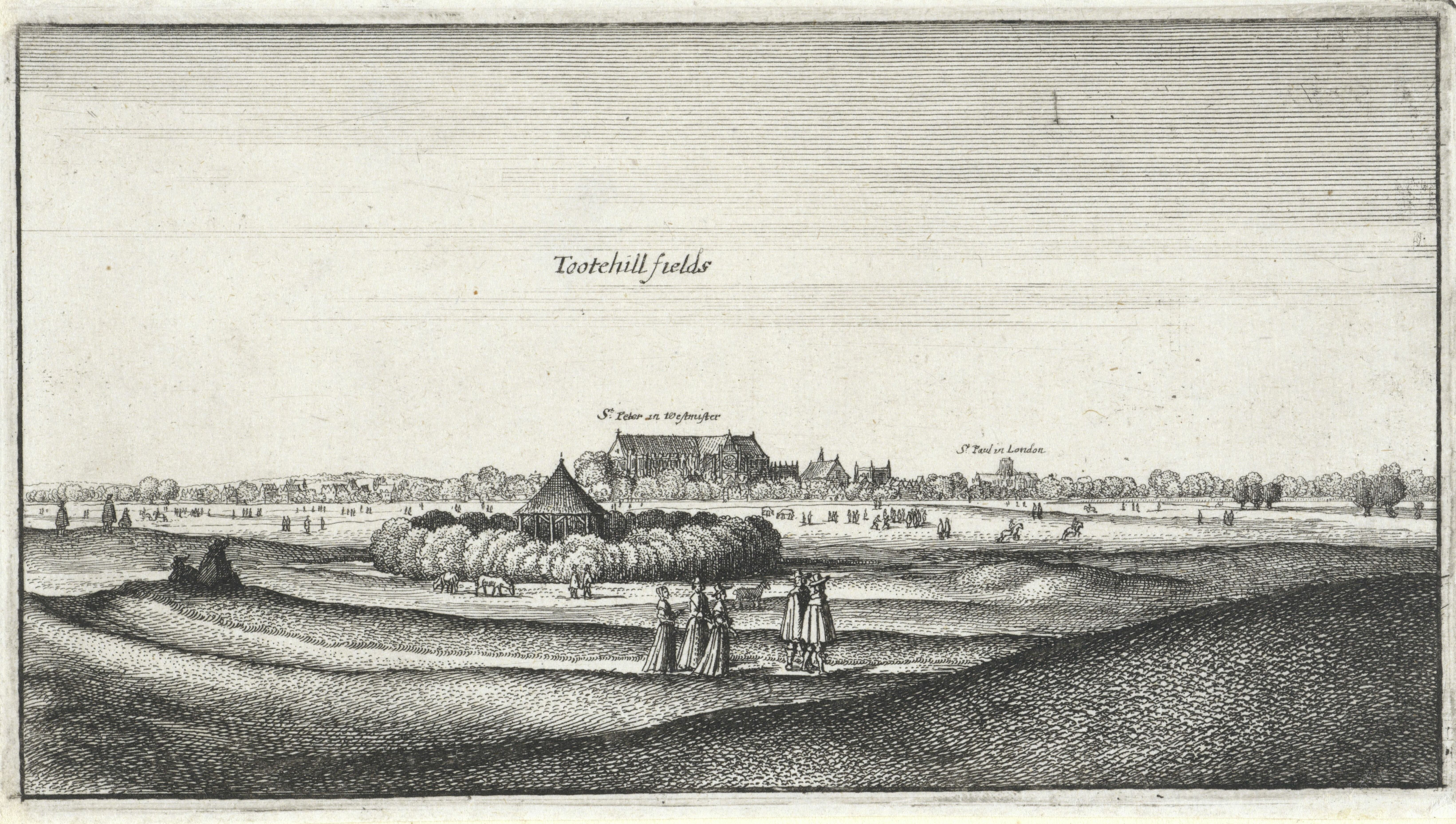
Tothill Fields by Wenceslas Hollar, 1643-1644

Tothill Fields was an area of Westminster in the county of Middlesex that lay south of St James's Park on the north bank of the river Thames. One of its main features was the Tothill Fields Bridewell penitentiary.

Between 1735 and 1752, it was the home venue of the Westminster Cricket Club. The earliest known match there was in August 1735, when Westminster defeated London by 3 wickets. Records have survived of two Westminster matches there in 1752, both against Addington. The result of the first is unknown and Westminster won the second by 10 runs.

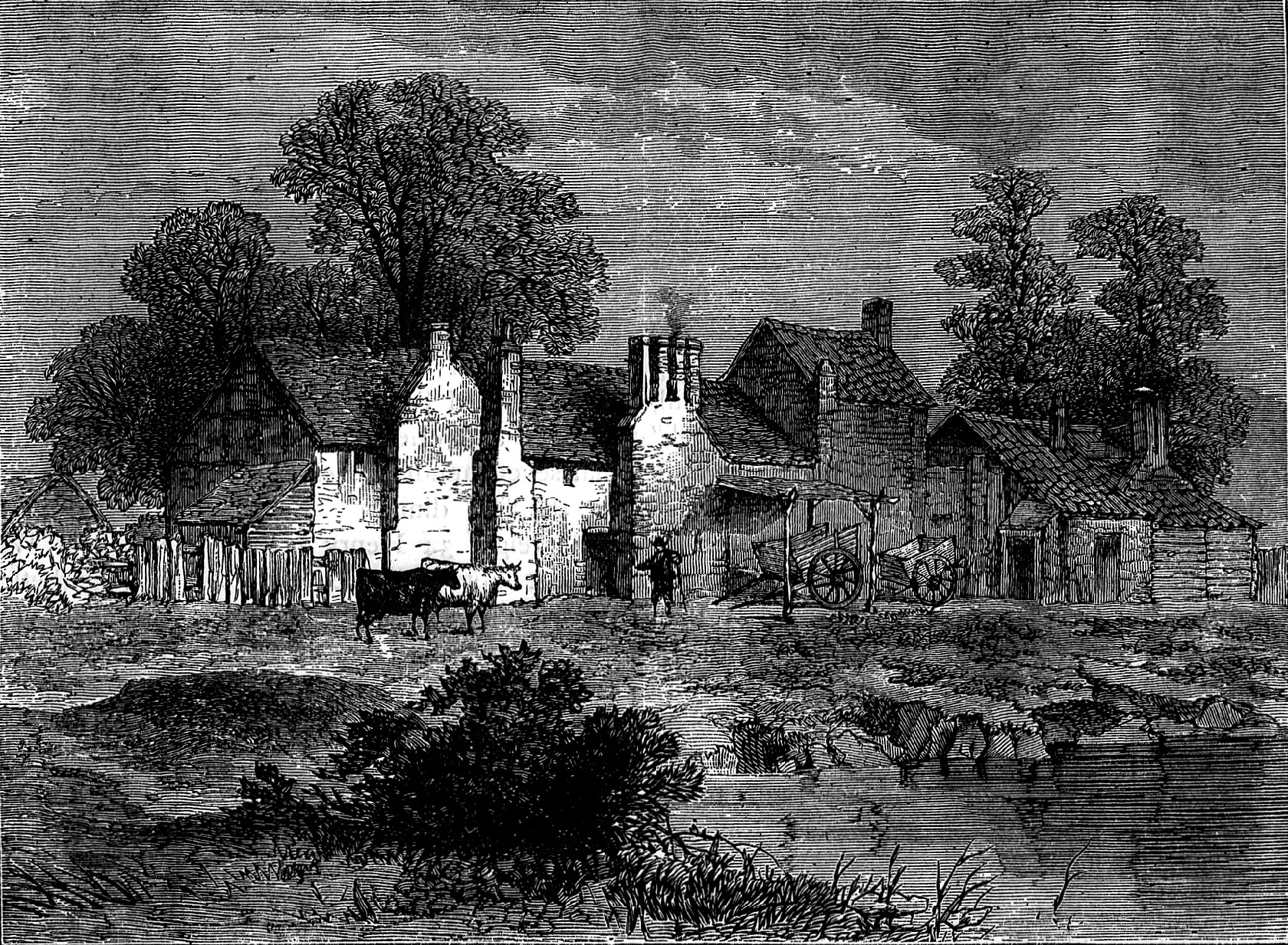
The Five Houses, a view of the Pest-Houses at Tothill Fields in 1796

Tothill Fields is one of many places listed in History of the British Turf where annual horseracing had ceased to take place after 1798.
