= List of Sheffield Cricket Club players =

This is an incomplete list in alphabetical order of cricketers who played for Sheffield Cricket Club in historically important matches. (Note: Some eleven-a-side matches played from 1772 to 1863 have been rated "first-class" by certain sources. However, the term only came into common use around 1864, when overarm bowling was legalised. It was formally defined as a standard by a meeting at Lord's, in May 1894, of Marylebone Cricket Club (MCC) and the county clubs which were then competing in the County Championship. The ruling was effective from the beginning of the 1895 season, but pre-1895 matches of the same standard have no official definition of status because the ruling is not retrospective. Matches of a similar standard since the beginning of the 1864 season are generally considered to have an unofficial first-class status. Pre-1864 matches which are included in the ACS' "Important Match Guide" may generally be regarded as important or, at least, historically significant. For further information, see First-class cricket.) Sheffield was superseded by Yorkshire County Cricket Club, which it founded in 1841. Some of the earlier teams fielded by Sheffield were styled Yorkshire, and its players in those games are included here. Sheffield is classified by recognised sources as an important team from 1771 to 1863.

Note that some players represented other important teams besides Sheffield, and that several also played for the county club in or after 1863. Those who played only for the county club from 1863 are not included here, but are instead named in the county club list. The details are the player's usual name followed by the years in which he was active as a Sheffield player, and then his name is given as it usually appears on match scorecards.

== A ==
- George Anderson (1850–1862)
- George Armitage (1847–1853)
- George Atkinson (1858–1862)

== B ==
- Samuel Baldwinson (1844–1851)
- Joseph Barber (1852)
- William Barber (1822–1828)
- Thomas Barker (1836)
- Thomas Barker (1833–1851)
- Frederick Barlow (1834–1836)
- Hugh Barrett (1845–1847)
- J. Bentley (1844–1846)
- George Berry (1845–1853)
- John Berry (1849–1862)
- Joseph Berry (1861–1862)
- Henry Bolsover (1830–1839)
- Henry Boothroyd (1853)
- Thomas Brownhill (1862)
- James Burbeary (1846–1853)
- William Burley (1844)
- Tom Burlinson (1844–1846)

== C ==
- George Chatterton (1846–1861)
- C. Clarke (1846)
- George Coates (1844–1853)
- James Cobbett (1835)
- Henry Cole (1835)
- Andrew Crossland (1844–1855)
- William Cuttell (1862)

== D ==
- Thomas Dakin (1851–1862)
- George Dallas (1850)
- Edwin Dawson (1862)
- George Dawson (1822–1839)
- Thomas Deakin (1833–1836)
- Charles Dearman (1822–1832)
- James Dearman (1827–1847)

== E ==
- J. E. Eadon (1852)
- Thomas Ellis (1849–1851)
- Michael Ellison (1849–1855)

== F ==
- J. Fisher (1827)

== G ==
- Gainsford (1834)
- Joseph Gillott (1846–1850)
- Luke Greenwood (1861–1862)

== H ==
- Henry Hall (1825–1839)
- John Hall (1844–1847)
- William Halton (1861–1862)
- Henry Hattersley (1834)
- Isaac Hodgson (1847–1862)
- Holdsworth (1830–1831)
- John Holdsworth (1844)
- Tom Hunt (1845–1851)
- Benjamin Huntsman (1846–1852)
- H. Hurt (1846–1849)
- Joseph Hydes (1834–1839)

== I ==
- John Ibbetson (1845–1847)
- Roger Iddison (1853–1862)
- William Ingle (Sheffield cricketer) (1845–1847)

== J ==
- C. Jeffcock (1852)
- P. S. Johnston (1833–1834)
- Jonathan Joy (1849–1862)

== K ==
- E. B. Kaye (1852–1855)
- William Kaye (1853–1855)

== L ==
- M. Lambert (1845)
- W. Lupton (1833)

== M ==
- J. Mallinson (1832–1834)
- Tom Marsden (1824–1839)
- John McCoy (1834)
- John Mills (1862)
- Viscount Milton (1847–1852)

== O ==
- Joseph Oates (1844)
- Osguthorpe (1771–1772; known to have played in Sheffield's two matches versus Nottingham)

== P ==
- Henry Pickard (1852–1862)
- James Porter (1844–1845)
- G. Powell (1851)
- John Prest (1852–1854)
- William Prest (1861–1862)

== R ==
- George Rawlins (1827–1836)
- Riley (1832)
- Thomas Robinson (1858–1862)
- Joseph Rowbotham (1853–1862)

== S ==
- Henry Sampson (1839–1860)
- J. Shackley (1830–1834)
- Frederick Shaw (1835–1836)
- John Shaw (1845)
- Henry Skelton (1846–1847)
- Richard Skelton (1846–1854)
- G. Skinner (1825–1829)
- William Slinn (1861–1862)
- C. Smith (1846)
- George Smith (1825–1836)
- John Smith (1845–1847)
- Paul Smith (1845–1854)
- Henry Southern (1825–1828)
- Ned Stephenson (1854–1862)

== T ==
- H. Taylor (1846–1848)
- W. Taylor (1828–1829)
- John Thewlis senior (1862)
- H. Thompson (1829–1831)
- John Thompson (1847–1858)
- Richard Thorp (1862)
- George Thorpe (1862)

== V ==
- Emmanuel Vincent (1822–1846)
- J. Vincent (1846–1849)

== W ==
- William Wadsworth (1845–1862)
- Bernard Wake (1839–1851)
- C. Ward (1844)
- William Waterfall (1860–1862)
- Brian Waud (1861–1862)
- Charles Webster (1858–1862)
- J. Webster (1822–1829)
- George Wescoe (1854)
- George Wheatcroft (1831–1832)
- R. Wheatley (1836)
- F. Wilkinson (1836)
- W. Wilson (1828–1836)
- J. Womack (1844)
- William Woolhouse (1822–1834)
- John Woollen (1832–1839)
- W. Worrall (1848)
- Henry Wright (1846–1860)
- John Wright (1822–1828)

== See also ==
- List of Yorkshire County Cricket Club players

== Bibliography ==
- ACS (1981). A Guide to Important Cricket Matches Played in the British Isles 1709–1863. Nottingham: ACS. OCLC 85045528.
- ACS (1982). A Guide to First-class Cricket Matches Played in the British Isles. Nottingham: ACS. OCLC 10586869.
- Buckley, G. B. (1935). Fresh Light on 18th Century Cricket. Birmingham: Cotterell & Co. OCLC 23450280.
- Buckley, G. B. (1937). Fresh Light on pre-Victorian Cricket. Birmingham: Cotterell & Co. OCLC 23469107.
- Haygarth, Arthur (1996) [1862]. Scores & Biographies, Volume 1 (1744–1826). Kennington: Frederick Lillywhite. ISBN 978-19-00592-23-9.
