= List of Nottingham Cricket Club players =

This is a list in alphabetical order of cricketers who played for Nottingham Cricket Club in historically important matches from 1771 to 1848. (Note: Some eleven-a-side matches played from 1772 to 1863 have been rated "first-class" by certain sources. However, the term only came into common use around 1864, when overarm bowling was legalised. It was formally defined as a standard by a meeting at Lord's, in May 1894, of Marylebone Cricket Club (MCC) and the county clubs which were then competing in the County Championship. The ruling was effective from the beginning of the 1895 season, but pre-1895 matches of the same standard have no official definition of status because the ruling is not retrospective. Matches of a similar standard since the beginning of the 1864 season are generally considered to have an unofficial first-class status. Pre-1864 matches which are included in the ACS' "Important Match Guide" may generally be regarded as important or, at least, historically significant. For further information, see First-class cricket.) Often referred to as "the town club", Nottingham was eventually superseded by Nottinghamshire County Cricket Club, which the town club founded in 1841. Some of the earlier teams fielded by Nottingham were styled Nottinghamshire, and its players in those games are included here. Nottingham is classified by significant sources as an important team from 1771 to 1848.

Note that some players represented other important teams besides Nottingham, and that several also played for the county club in or after 1841. Those who played only for the county club from 1841 are not included here, but are instead named in the county club list. The details are the player's usual name followed by the years in which he was active as a Nottingham player, and then his name is given as it usually appears on match scorecards.

== A ==
- William Astill (1825) : W. Astill
- Henry Attenburrow (1848) : H. C. Attenburrow

== B ==
- Bamford (1772) : Bamford
- S. Barker (1829) : S. Barker
- Thomas Barker (1826–1840) : T. Barker
- William Barker (1789–1792) : W. Barker
- Peter Bramley (1813–1829) : P. Bramley
- James Brittain (1813–1829) : J. Brittain
- William Brittain (1800–1813) : W. Brittain
- Charles Brown (1848) : C. Brown
- Bush (1829) : Bush
- George Butler (1848) : G. Butler
- John Buttery (1848) : J. Buttery

== C ==
- John Carter (1789) : J. Carter
- John Chapman (1848) : J. Chapman
- William Chapman (1791–1800) : W. Chapman
- Thomas Charlton (1840) : T. B. Charlton
- William Clarke (1825–1840) : W. Clarke
- Coleman (1771–1772) : Coleman
- Collishaw (1771–1772) : Collishaw
- Charles Creswell (1840) : C. Creswell
- Henry Crook (1827–1837) : H. Crook

== D ==
- John Day (1829–1835) : J. Day
- Joseph Dennis (1800–1829) : J. Dennis
- W. Dexter (1791) : W. Dexter

== E ==
- Leonard Elliott (1800–1813) : L. Elliott

== F ==
- Thomas Foster (1827–1828) : T. Foster
- John Foxcraft (1837–1840) : J. Foxcraft

== G ==
- George Galloway (1837) : G. G. Galloway
- William Garrat (1829–1840) : W. Garrat
- John Gibson (1837) : J. Gibson
- Robert Gibson (1828–1829) : R. Gibson
- Joseph Gilbert (1789–1792) : J. Gilbert
- Gladwin (1772) : Gladwin
- Billy Good (1831–1840) : B. Good
- Charles Goodall (1826) : C. Goodall
- Joe Guy (1837–1840) : J. Guy

== H ==
- Hall (1829) : Hall
- George Harrison (1789–1792) : G. Harrison
- Hayworth (1829) : Hayworth
- Thomas Heath (1828–1840) : T. Heath
- Samuel Hedderley (1789–1791) : S. Hedderley
- John Henson (1834) : J. Henson
- William Hewitt (1825–1829) : W. Hewitt
- John Hilton (1829–1830) : J. Hilton
- Humphrey Hopkin (1791–1825) : H. Hopkin
- Huythwaite (1771) : Huythwaite

== J ==
- Charles Jarvis (1826) : C. Jarvis
- George Jarvis (1826–1840) : G. Jarvis
- William Jefferies (1800) : W. Jefferies
- Isaac Johnson (1840) : I. Johnson
- John Johnson (1848) : J. Johnson

== K ==
- Francis Kerry (1830) : F. S. Kerry
- John Kettleband (1825–1832) : J. Kettleband

== L ==
- Loughman (1771–1772) : Loughman

== M ==
- Mew (1771–1772) : Mew
- Samuel Mugglestone (1789–1791) : S. Mugglestone
- William Musters (1848) : W. M. C. Musters

== N ==
- Thomas Neape (1800) : T. Neape
- William North (1827–1829) : W. North

== O ==
- John Oscroft (1829–1848) : J. Oscroft

== P ==
- Butler Parr (1835–1840) : B. Parr
- George Parr (1848) : G. Parr
- Samuel Parr (1840) : S. Parr
- Edwin Patchitt (1840) : E. Patchitt
- Perrins (1792) : Perrins

== R ==
- Rawson (1771) : Rawson
- Sam Redgate (1829–1840) : S. Redgate
- Thomas Redgate (1840) : T. B. Redgate
- Roe (1771–1772) : Roe
- George Rothera (1832–1837) : G. Rothera

== S ==
- William Sheraton (1827–1831) : W. Sheraton (Note: Sheraton made his first known appearance for Nottingham in July 1827, against Sheffield at Darnall New Ground.)
- Skevington (1800) : Skevington
- Hiram Slack (1831–1832) : H. Slack (Note: Slack was born at Hucknall Torkard on 28 August 1808, and died at Mickleover, in Derbyshire, on 8 July 1853. He appeared in two important matches for Nottingham, both against Sheffield at the Hyde Park Ground. His death was reported in a Nottingham newspaper as a suicide occurring at the Derbyshire County Lunatic Asylum, and he was recorded as a "pauper lunatic".)
- J. Slack (1829) : J. Slack
- George Smith (1825–1827) : G. Smith
- Robert Smith (1800–1814) : R. Smith
- Spurr (1771–1772) : Spurr
- Edward Stevenson (1789–1792) : E. Stevenson
- James Stevenson (1789–1792) : J. Stevenson
- Stocks (1771–1772) : Stocks
- William Streets (1792–1800) : W. Streets
- Swanwick (1829) : Swanwick

== T ==
- George Thorpe (1825–1826) : G. Thorpe
- Troop (1771–1772) : Troop
- Thomas Trueman (1827) : T. Trueman
- Turner (1771–1772) : Turner

== U ==
- William Upton (1827–1828) : W. Upton

== V ==
- Emmanuel Vincent (1828–1832) : E. Vincent

== W ==
- Walker (1829) : Walker
- Richard Warsop (1789–1826) : R. Warsop
- Samuel Warsop (1792) : S. Warsop
- Thomas Warsop (1800) : T. Warsop
- William Warsop (1789–1817) : W. Warsop
- Jonas Warwick (1848) : J. B. Warwick
- H. Weston (1800) : H. Weston
- James Weston (1800) : J. Weston
- Samuel Willows (1789–1792) : S. Willows
- William Woodward (1829–1835) : W. Woodward
- Michael Woolley (1792) : M. Woolley

== See also ==
- List of Nottinghamshire County Cricket Club players

== Bibliography ==
- ACS (1981). A Guide to Important Cricket Matches Played in the British Isles 1709–1863. Nottingham: ACS. OCLC 85045528.
- ACS (1982). A Guide to First-class Cricket Matches Played in the British Isles. Nottingham: ACS. OCLC 10586869.
- Buckley, G. B. (1935). Fresh Light on 18th Century Cricket. Birmingham: Cotterell & Co. OCLC 23450280.
- Buckley, G. B. (1937). Fresh Light on pre-Victorian Cricket. Birmingham: Cotterell & Co. OCLC 23469107.
- Haygarth, Arthur (1996) [1862]. Scores & Biographies, Volume 1 (1744–1826). Kennington: Frederick Lillywhite. ISBN 978-19-00592-23-9.
- Haygarth, Arthur (1997) [1862]. Scores & Biographies, Volume 2 (1827–1840). Kennington: Frederick Lillywhite. ISBN 978-19-00592-23-9.
