= The Wednesday Cricket Club =

Cricket club in Sheffield, England

Team information
- Established: 1820
- Last match: 1924
- Home venue: Darnall cricket ground Hyde Park; Bramall Lane

History
- Notable players: Tom Marsden; William Slinn; Tom Armitage; George Ulyett; Michael Ellison; Tom Hunt; George Pinder

The Wednesday Cricket Club, founded in 1820, became one of the pre-eminent cricket clubs in the Sheffield area. It was the direct forerunner of Sheffield Wednesday Football Club. It was reformed in 2011 and has risen from Section 7 in the Mansfield District League to Section 2 in 2017. Its midweek team played in Division A of the Sheffield Alliance Midweek League in 2018 after winning Division B in 2017.

== History ==
Six local tradesmen – William Stratford, John Southren, Tom Lindley, William Woolhouse, George Dawson and George Hardisty – founded the Wednesday Cricket Club in 1820. Its name referred to their day off from work, the only day they could play. William Stratford was the first president, followed by Richard Gillott. The club played at several cricket grounds in the Sheffield area.

Sheffield had been the hub of cricket in the north of England during the first half of the nineteenth century, and Sheffield Cricket Club had played under the guise of "Yorkshire" for many years prior to the formation of Yorkshire County Cricket Club in 1863.

Several prominent local cricketers appeared for the Wednesday club, such as Michael Ellison, William Slinn, Tom Hunt, George Pinder, Tom Armitage, George Ulyett, and Tom Marsden. Ellison went on to help form Yorkshire County Cricket Club whilst Armitage and Ulyett were selected for England's first Test cricket tour of Australia in 1877. Marsden was for many years the best single wicket cricketer in the north of England and was said to have put up a £50 reward for anyone to beat him. The great southern cricketer of the time, Fuller Pilch, did just that in 1833, beating Marsden in Norwich. When a rematch was organised, over 20,000 spectators crammed into the Old Darnall ground hoping to see Marsden defeated once more. Marsden also scored 227 in a game for Sheffield & Leicester versus Nottingham, at that time only the third double century seen in England. In 1841, Marsden finally lost his northern single wicket crown to Henry Sampson, another Wednesday player, who later that year scored 162 against Sheffield.

In 1867, the Wednesday cricket club formed a football club, primarily to keep players fit over the winter months. The Wednesday Football club rose to national prominence by the end of the 19th century, winning the 1896 FA Cup Final and becoming English Champions in 1903. The football club officially changed their name to Sheffield Wednesday F.C. in 1929. Several players managed to successfully appear for both the football and cricket sections of the club in the late 19th century including William Stacey and Lance Morley notably George Ulyett. Ulyett played several times for England and also played football for Wednesday in 1882-83 and 1883–84 seasons as a goalkeeper.

The cricket club was disbanded in 1924 due to financial difficulties.

In 2011 a group of Sheffield Wednesday football supporters re-formed the club, entering the team into a local Sheffield league in time for the start of the 2011 season. Christopher Bolsover was the first captain of the re-formed club.

== Cricket grounds and notable events ==
- Wednesday initially played at Darnall Cricket Ground which was established by William Woolhouse, one of the six founders of the club, and his father-in-law George Steer. The old Darnall ground collapsed during the first historically important match there – Sheffield v. Nottingham attended by 2000 people.
- Darnall New Ground was built to replace the old ground and was much larger, hosting several notable games including in 1828 when a combined Yorkshire, Leicestershire and Nottinghamshire XI faced the Rest of England in front of a sell-out crowd of 8,000.
- After playing in Darnall for several years, Wednesday moved to Hyde Park as it was closer to the centre of town. Hyde Park had a capacity of 16,000.
- When Wednesday played Nottingham in 1833, George Dawson was the victim of a disputed run out decision which was recorded in the score book as "cheated out".
- In 1841 Harry Sampson scored 162, the highest ever score on the ground, while playing for Wednesday against Sheffield Town.
- As Hyde Park fell into disrepair, local cricketers began looking for yet another venue. A new ground at Newhall was used for United England Eleven versus a Sheffield XV. However, Newhall was too far from the town, seating was limited and the wicket was poor.
- A group of local cricketers including William Stratford and Michael Ellison representing Wednesday managed to lease an area of land on Bramall Lane to build a pavilion and rent some land around it in 1855. A few months later, the first cricket match at Bramall Lane was played between two teams picked from Sheffield, Wednesday, Broomhall, Milton, Caxton and Shrewsbury clubs.
- Wednesday continued to play at Bramall Lane until 1893.

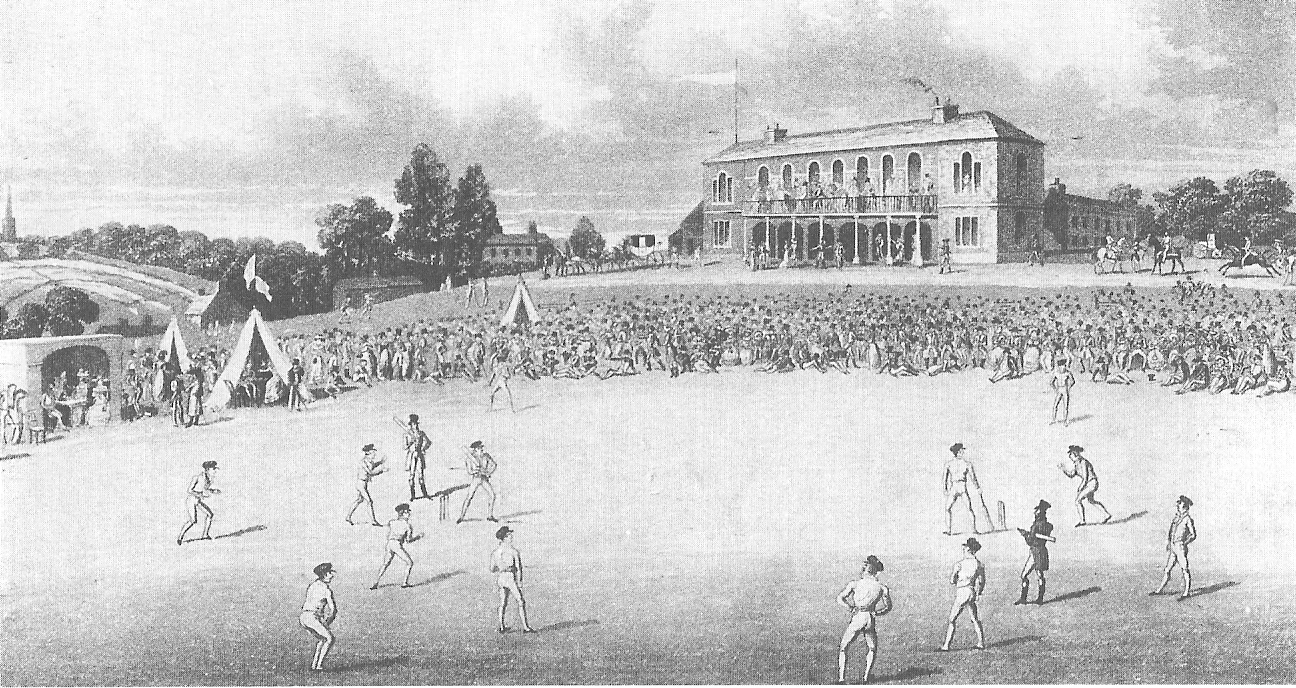
A cricket match at Darnall in the 1820s, a venue at which Wednesday often played.

== External sources ==
- The Owl: Andrew Drake
- New The Wednesday CC
