= Hiram Slack (cricketer, born 1808) =

English cricketer (1808–1853)

Hiram Slack (28 August 1808 – 9 July 1853) was an English cricketer who played for Nottingham Cricket Club in 1831 and 1832. He was born in Hucknall Torkard, Nottinghamshire. Slack was a batsman, but his handedness is unknown. It is possible he had amateur status. He played in two historically important matches for Nottingham, both against Sheffield at their Hyde Park Ground. In total, he scored 47 runs with a highest score of 23, but he took no catches or wickets.

== Matches ==
Slack played for Nottingham, mostly in matches against other town teams, between 1827 and 1832. It is thought, without certainty, that he also played in a match at Mansfield in 1836. He made his first known appearance in an historically important match on 29–31 August 1831, playing for Nottingham against Sheffield at their Hyde Park Ground. Nottingham, led by William Clarke, batted first, and scored 184 all out. Slack, who was ninth in the batting order, was the not out batsman with 18 runs. In their first innings, Sheffield were dismissed for 67. Nottingham struggled in their second innings, and were all out for 98. Slack was out for 4, caught by George Wheatcroft. Nottingham then dismissed Sheffield for 90 to win the match by 125 runs.

In his report of that match, Arthur Haygarth implied that a return was expected to take place, but it did not. Sheffield hosted Nottingham again, over a year later, on 15–17 October 1832, also at the Hyde Park Ground. Nottingham were again captained by Clarke, and the team included Sam Redgate, their noted roundarm pace bowler.

Slack was seventh in the batting order, and he was out for 2 in Nottingham's first innings, in which they scored 124 all out. They dismissed Sheffield for 52 to take a first innings lead of 72. As in the 1831 match, Nottingham struggled in their second innings, but they were buoyed by a sixth wicket partnership of 49 between Slack and Tom Heath. Slack scored 23 before he was stumped by James Dearman. Thanks to the partnership, Nottingham were able to total a respectable 132, leaving Sheffield with a target of 205. Sheffield had no answer to Redgate, and were all out for 51, Nottingham winning by 153 runs.

== Personal life and death ==
Slack had a namesake nephew (1843–1918), who was also a first-class cricketer. Slack Jr was from Bradford, but he played mostly for clubs in and around Birmingham. He played for the North in 1866, and for the All England Eleven in 1875.

Slack Sr died at Mickleover, Derbyshire, in 1853. His death was reported in a Nottingham newspaper as a suicide, which occurred at the Derbyshire County Lunatic Asylum. He was recorded as a "pauper lunatic".

== Bibliography ==
- Haygarth, Arthur (1996) [1862]. Scores & Biographies, Volume 1 (1744–1826). Kennington: Frederick Lillywhite. ISBN 978-19-00592-23-9.
- Haygarth, Arthur (1997) [1862]. Scores & Biographies, Volume 2 (1827–1840). Kennington: Frederick Lillywhite. ISBN 978-19-00592-23-9.
