= Richard Skelton (cricketer) =

English first-class cricketer

Personal information
- Full name: Richard Frederic Skelton
- Born: 22 January 1821; Middlewood, Yorkshire, England
- Died: 11 June 1858 (aged 37); Middlewood, Yorkshire, England
- Batting: Unknown
- Bowling: Unknown
- Relatives: Henry Skelton (brother)

Domestic team information
- Years: Team
- 1849–1853: Yorkshire

Career statistics
Competition	First-class
Matches	22
Runs scored	289
Batting average	8.50
100s/50s	–/–
Top score	32
Balls bowled	1,814
Wickets	86
Bowling average	12.61
5 wickets in innings	8
10 wickets in match	1
Best bowling	6/88
Catches/stumpings	7/–
- Source: Cricinfo, 29 July 2019

Richard Frederic Skelton (22 January 1821 – 11 June 1858) was an English first-class cricketer.

Skelton was born at Middlewood Hall near Sheffield in January 1821. He made his debut in first-class cricket for Sheffield against Manchester at Sheffield in June 1846, with Skelton featuring in the return fixture at Manchester. His next first-class appearances came for Sheffield in 1848, when he played twice against Nottingham and once against Manchester. The following season he made three first-class appearances for a Sheffield team, this time playing under the name Yorkshire, making two appearances against Lancashire and one appearance against Kent. From 1850–54, he played ten further first-class matches for teams styled as Sheffield or Yorkshire. In addition to playing for Sheffield/Yorkshire teams, Skelton also played first-class matches for the Gentlemen in the Gentlemen v Players match of 1851, while in 1852 he played at Lord's for the Gentlemen of the North against the Gentlemen of the South and followed this up by playing for the Gentlemen of England against the Gentlemen of Kent. In 22 first-class appearances, Skelton took 86 wickets at an average of 12.61, with best figures of 8 for 29. These figures, one of eight five wicket hauls he took, came for Yorkshire against an All England Eleven in 1851. Skelton died at Middlewood Hall in June 1858. His brother, Henry, also played first-class cricket.
