= William Woolhouse =

English cricketer

Personal information
- Full name: William Henry Woolhouse
- Born: 21 January 1791; Sheffield, Yorkshire, England
- Died: 14 July 1837 (aged 46); London, England
- Batting: Left-handed
- Bowling: Left-arm roundarm (unknown style)

Domestic team information
- Years: Team
- 1833–1834: Yorkshire

Career statistics
Competition	First-class
Matches	17
Runs scored	440
Batting average	14.19
100s/50s	–/1
Top score	51
Balls bowled	–
Wickets	–
Bowling average	–
5 wickets in innings	–
10 wickets in match	–
Best bowling	–
Catches/stumpings	18/–
- Source: Cricinfo, 16 June 2013

William Henry Woolhouse (21 January 1791 – 14 July 1837) was an English cricketer active in the 1820s and 1830s, making seventeen appearances in first-class cricket. Born at Sheffield, Yorkshire, Woolhouse was a left-handed batsman and left-arm roundarm bowler, who played for several first-class cricket teams. He was most notable as a founding member of The Wednesday Cricket Club, which organised early county matches in Yorkshire, and along with his father-in-law George Steer he was also behind the establishment of both the Darnall Old Ground and Darnall New Ground.

== Career ==
In 1822, Woolhouse, along with William Stratford, John Southren, Tom Lindley, George Dawson, and George Hardisty, founded The Wednesday Cricket Club. In 1822, along with his father-in-law, Woolhouse was behind the construction of the Darnall Old Ground, as well as the Darnall New Ground. Woolhouse later made his debut in first-class cricket for a combined Sheffield and Leicester team against Nottingham in 1826, while the following season he made two first-class appearances for Sheffield against Nottingham. He made several first-class appearances in 1828, playing for England against The Bs at Lord's, as well as playing for a Left Handed team in the Left-Handed v Right-Handed fixture. He also made two first-class appearances for Sheffield against Nottingham, and played for a combined Yorkshire-Nottinghamshire-Leicestershire against England. Following two first-class appearances for Sheffield in 1829, Woolhouse made a single appearance for the team in 1830, 1831, and 1832. In 1833, Woolhouse made a second first-class appearance for the Left-Handed team, this time against the Marylebone Cricket Club, before appearing in Yorkshire's inaugural first-class match in September against Norfolk at the Hyde Park Ground, Sheffield. He made two further first-class appearances, both for Yorkshire against Norfolk in 1834.

Playing seventeen first-class matches, Woolhouse scored a total of 440 runs at an average of 14.19, with a high score of 51. Playing nine of his seventeen matches for Sheffield, Woolhouse scored 259 runs for the team, averaging 16.18 and making his highest score for the team.

He died in London on 14 July 1837.
