= Frederick Barlow =

English cricketer

Domestic team information
- Years: Team
- 1834–1836: Sheffield

Frederick Barlow (dates of birth and death unknown) was an English cricketer, active 1834–36, who played for Sheffield Cricket Club. Barlow's batting style is unknown. He was christened at Sheffield, Yorkshire on 2 March 1808.

Barlow made his debut in 1834 for Sheffield in a match against Norfolk at the Hyde Park Ground in Sheffield. In matches against county teams, Sheffield were called Yorkshire. Later in 1834, Barlow played for Sheffield against Nottingham at Hyde Park. His next appearances in important matches were in 1836, when he played twice more against Norfolk, once at the New Ground, Norwich and the other at Hyde Park. In four important matches, he scored 58 runs, averaging 8.28, with a highest score of 22.

== Bibliography ==
- Haygarth, Arthur (1997) [1862]. Scores & Biographies, Volume 2 (1827–1840). Kennington: Frederick Lillywhite. ISBN 978-19-00592-23-9.
