= George Coates (cricketer) =

English cricketeer (1817–1885)

Personal information
- Full name: George Coates
- Born: 25 July 1817; Sheffield, Yorkshire, England
- Died: 1885 (aged 67/68); Sheffield, Yorkshire, England
- Batting: Unknown
- Bowling: Unknown

Domestic team information
- Years: Team
- 1844–1853: Yorkshire

Career statistics
Competition	First-class
Matches	24
Runs scored	610
Batting average	16.48
100s/50s	–/3
Top score	61
Balls bowled	28
Wickets	1
Bowling average	21.00
5 wickets in innings	–
10 wickets in match	–
Best bowling	1/9
Catches/stumpings	12/–
- Source: Cricinfo, 12 September 2019

George Coates (25 July 1817 – 1885) was an English first-class cricketer and umpire.

Coates was born at Sheffield in July 1817. He made his debut in first-class cricket for Yorkshire against Manchester at Moss Lane in 1844, with Coates playing in the same fixture in 1845. He made two first-class appearances in 1846 for Sheffield (essentially Yorkshire in all but name) against Manchester at Sheffield and Manchester, before making four first-class appearances in 1848, with Coates playing two matches each against Manchester and Nottingham. He continued to play regularly for Yorkshire/Sheffield until 1854. He also played first-class cricket for a United England Eleven in 1853, making two appearances against Yorkshire and the Gentlemen of England, in addition to playing twice for the North in the North v South fixtures of 1854–55. Making 24 first-class appearances, Coates scored a total of 610 runs at an average of 16.48, with a high score of 61. He also stood as an umpire in two first-class matches in 1852 and 1855. Coates died at Sheffield in 1885.
