= William Woodward (cricketer) =

English cricketer

Personal information
- Full name: William Woodward
- Born: Nottingham, Nottinghamshire, England
- Died: 4 July 1862; Barrie, Ontario, Canada
- Role: Occasional wicket-keeper

Domestic team information
- Years: Team
- 1830–1834: Nottingham Cricket Club
- 1835: Nottinghamshire

Career statistics
Competition	First-class
Matches	6
Runs scored	27
Batting average	3.37
100s/50s	0/0
Top score	13
Catches/stumpings	1/1
- Source: Cricinfo, 22 February 2013

William Woodward (unknown – 4 July 1862) was an English first-class cricketer who played for Nottingham Cricket Club (aka Nottinghamshire). Woodward's batting style is unknown, though it is known he occasionally played as a wicket-keeper. He was born in Nottingham, where he was christened on 26 November 1813; died in Barrie, Ontario.

Woodward made his first-class debut for Nottingham against Sheffield in 1830 at the Hyde Park Ground in Sheffield. His next appearances were in 1834 when Nottingham played two matches against Cambridge Town Club at Parker's Piece and the Forest New Ground. He made a further appearance for the club in that season against Sheffield. The following year he made two appearances for Nottinghamshire against Sussex. Woodward played in six first-class matches, scoring 27 runs at an average of 3.37, with a highest score of 13.
