= William North (cricketer) =

English cricketer

Personal information
- Full name: William North
- Born: Barton in Fabis, Nottinghamshire, England
- Died: 6 March 1855; Nottingham, Nottinghamshire, England

Domestic team information
- Years: Team
- 1827–1828: Nottingham Cricket Club

Career statistics
Competition	First-class
Matches	3
Runs scored	39
Batting average	7.80
100s/50s	0/0
Top score	27
Catches/stumpings	1/–
- Source: Cricinfo, 20 February 2013

William North (died 6 March 1855) was an English cricketer. North's batting style is unknown. He was born at Barton in Fabis, Nottinghamshire and was christened there on 13 December 1807.

North made three first-class cricket appearances for Nottingham Cricket Club. All three were against Sheffield Cricket Club, two of which were played at the Forest New Ground in 1827 and 1828 with the other at Darnall New Ground. He scored at total of 39 runs in his three matches at an average of 7.80, with a high score of 27.

He died at Nottingham, Nottinghamshire on 6 March 1855.
