= Henry Hattersley =

English cricketer

Personal information
- Full name: Henry Hattersley
- Born: 3 April 1812; Sheffield, Yorkshire, England
- Died: 23 January 1835 (aged 22); Sheffield, Yorkshire, England
- Batting: Unknown
- Bowling: Unknown

Domestic team information
- Years: Team
- 1834: Yorkshire

Career statistics
Competition	First-class
Matches	3
Runs scored	41
Batting average	10.25
100s/50s	–/–
Top score	26*
Balls bowled	404
Wickets	7
Bowling average	22.00
5 wickets in innings	–
10 wickets in match	–
Best bowling	4/25
Catches/stumpings	2/–
- Source: Cricinfo, 6 September 2020

Henry Hattersley (3 April 1812 – 23 January 1835) was an English first-class cricketer.

Hattersley was born at Sheffield in April 1812. He played first-class cricket on three occasions in 1834, playing twice for Yorkshire against Norfolk at Norwich and Sheffield, in addition to playing once for Sheffield (aka Yorkshire) against Nottingham. He scored 41 runs in his three matches, in addition to taking 7 wickets. Hattersley died the following year in January 1835.
