= Henry Bolsover =

English cricketer

Personal information
- Full name: Henry Bolsover
- Born: 31 December 1809; Sheffield, Yorkshire, England
- Died: 5 August 1876 (aged 66); Llandudno, Caernarvonshire, Wales
- Batting: Unknown

Career statistics
Competition	First-class
Matches	1
Runs scored	14
Batting average	14.00
100s/50s	–/–
Top score	13
Balls bowled	–
Wickets	–
Bowling average	–
5 wickets in innings	–
10 wickets in match	–
Best bowling	–
Catches/stumpings	–/–
- Source: Cricinfo, 21 July 2013

Henry Bolsover (31 December 1809 – 5 August 1876) was an English cricketer. Bolsover's batting style is unknown. He was born at Sheffield, Yorkshire.

Bolsover made a single first-class appearance for Sheffield against Nottingham in 1830 at Hyde Park Ground, Sheffield. In a match which Sheffield won by 41 runs, Bolsover ended Sheffield's first-innings not out on 1, while in their second-innings he was dismissed for 13 runs, stumped by Emmanuel Vincent off an unknown bowler.

He died at Llandudno, Caernarvonshire, Wales on 5 August 1876.
