= Astill =

Astill is a surname which originated from Leicester, and may refer to:

- Adam Astill, British actor
- Bruce Astill (b. 1955), Australian rugby league footballer
- Ewart Astill (1888–1948), English Test cricketer
- Grenville Astill, archaeology professor at the University of Reading
- Kenneth Astill (1920–2007), professor of mechanical engineering at Tufts University.
- Len Astill (1916–1990), English former footballer
- William Astill, British cricketer

== See also ==
- Still (disambiguation)
