= George Thorpe =

George Thorpe may refer to:

- George Thorpe (cricketer, born 1781) (1781–1847), English cricketer
- George Thorpe (cricketer, born 1834) (1834–1899), English cricketer
- George Thorpe (footballer) (1910–1985), English footballer for Leeds United, Huddersfield Town and Chester City
- George C. Thorpe (1875–1936), American officer in the United States Marine Corps
- George Thorp (Royal Navy officer) (1777–1797), Royal Navy officer killed at the Battle of Santa Cruz de Tenerife
- George Thorpe (Virginia colonist) (1576–1622), Virginia colonist and Berkeley Hundred co-founder
