= Thomas Foster (Nottingham cricketer) =

English cricketer

Personal information
- Full name: Thomas Foster
- Born: Unknown; Bingham, Nottinghamshire, England
- Died: Unknown
- Batting: Unknown

Domestic team information
- Years: Team
- 1827–1828: Nottingham Cricket Club

Career statistics
Competition	First-class
Matches	2
Runs scored	6
Batting average	2.00
100s/50s	–/–
Top score	4
Balls bowled	–
Wickets	–
Bowling average	–
5 wickets in innings	–
10 wickets in match	–
Best bowling	–
Catches/stumpings	–/–
- Source: Cricinfo, 20 February 2013

Thomas Foster (dates of birth and death unknown) was an English cricketer. Foster's batting style is unknown. It is known he was born at Bingham, Nottinghamshire.

Foster made two first-class appearances for Nottingham Cricket Club, with both appearances coming against Sheffield Cricket Club at the Forest New Ground in 1827 and 1828. He scored at total of 6 runs in his two matches with a high score of 4.
