= Paul Smith (cricketer, born 1820) =

English cricketer

Personal information
- Full name: Paul Smith
- Born: 26 March 1820; Sheffield, Yorkshire, England
- Died: Unknown
- Batting: Unknown
- Bowling: Unknown
- Relatives: John Smith (brother)

Domestic team information
- Years: Team
- 1946: Sheffield

Paul Smith (26 March 1820 – 1???) was an English cricketer. Smith's batting and bowling styles are unknown.

Born at Sheffield, Yorkshire, Smith made his debut for Sheffield against Manchester in 1846 at Hyde Ground Park, Sheffield. He made a second fixture in that season in the return fixture between the teams at Moss Lane, Manchester. In his two matches, he scored a total of 68 runs at an average of 17.00, with a high score of 40. With the ball, he took 6 wickets, all of which came in a single innings during the match at Manchester. Outside of playing matches for Sheffield, Smith was also active in club cricket in Newcastle and County Durham. He was a pub landlord, including at the Bath Inn in Newcastle, which was the home of the Northumberland Club which he played for.

His brother John also played.

== External list ==
- Paul Smith at ESPNcricinfo
