= William Wadsworth (cricketer) =

English cricketer

Personal information
- Full name: William Wadsworth
- Born: 9 October 1823; Baildon, Yorkshire, England
- Died: 13 June 1891 (aged 67); Bradford, Yorkshire, England
- Batting: Unknown

Domestic team information
- Years: Team
- 1845–1862: Yorkshire

Career statistics
Competition	First-class
Matches	9
Runs scored	107
Batting average	8.23
100s/50s	–/–
Top score	21*
Catches/stumpings	3/–
- Source: Cricinfo, 1 July 2019

William Wadsworth (9 October 1823 – 13 June 1891) was an English first-class cricketer.

Wadsworth was born at Baildon in October 1823. He made his debut in first-class cricket in 1845, when he played twice for Yorkshire against Manchester at Manchester. His next appearance in first-class cricket came over a decade later for the North in the North v South fixture of 1857. He played four first-class matches in 1858, playing in the North v South fixture, as well as appearing for the North against Surrey at The Oval. He also appeared for an All England Eleven against a United All England Eleven at Lord's, and for a combined Durham and Yorkshire cricket team against Nottinghamshire at Stockton-on-Tees. His final two first-class appearances came in 1861 and 1862, both for Yorkshire. In nine first-class matches, Wadsworth scored 107 runs at an average of 8.23, with a high score of 21 not out. He died at Bradford in June 1891.
