= Hiram Slack =

Hiram Slack may refer to:

- Hiram Slack (Nottinghamshire cricketer) (1808–1853)
- Hiram Slack (North of England cricketer) (1843–1918), nephew of Hiram Slack (Nottinghamshire cricketer)
