= Benjamin Huntsman (cricketer) =

English cricketer (1820–1893)

Personal information
- Full name: Benjamin Huntsman
- Born: 21 March 1820; Attercliffe, Yorkshire, England
- Died: 27 June 1893 (aged 73); West Retford, Nottinghamshire, England
- Batting: Unknown

Domestic team information
- Years: Team
- 1851: Yorkshire

Career statistics
Competition	First-class
Matches	7
Runs scored	47
Batting average	4.27
100s/50s	–/–
Top score	16
Catches/stumpings	3/–
- Source: Cricinfo, 7 September 2020

Benjamin Huntsman DL (21 March 1820 – 27 June 1893) was an English first-class cricketer and colliery owner.

The son of Francis Huntsman, he was born in March 1820 at Attercliffe, Yorkshire. Huntsman played first-class cricket on seven occasions between 1846 and 1852, making six appearances for Sheffield (aka Yorkshire). Five of these came against Manchester (aka Lancashire), with one against Nottingham (aka Nottinghamshire). He made one first-class appearance for a team playing as Yorkshire against Lancashire at Sheffield in 1851. He scored 47 runs in his seven matches, with a high score of 16.

Outside of cricket, Huntsman was a proprietor of land and houses, in addition to owning the Tinsley Park Collieries. During the Strike of 1869–70, he locked out his miners and employed non-union staff. He was a member of the 1st West Yorkshire Yeomanry, having been appointed as a cornet in May 1852. He gained the rank of lieutenant in April 1856, before being promoted to captain in March 1862. He resigned his commission in February 1872. He was also an alderman of the city of Nottingham and was appointed a deputy lieutenant of Nottinghamshire in May 1887. Huntsman died in June 1893 at West Retford, Nottinghamshire. His great-grandfather was Benjamin Huntsman, the inventor and manufacturer of cast or crucible steel.
