= Peter Bramley (cricketer) =

English cricketer

Peter Bramley (1785 – 5 November 1838) was an English professional cricketer who played for Nottingham Cricket Club. He was primarily a batsman who fielded at cover point.

He was a publican by trade and kept the Old Spot Inn at Daybrook in Nottinghamshire. A keen cards player, he had a reputation for gambling but was said to be "fundamentally kind at heart".

The only historically important match that Bramley took part in was Sheffield and Leicester v Nottingham at Sheffield's Darnall New Ground in July 1826. Tom Marsden scored 227 for Sheffield and Leicester, who won by an innings and 203.

Bramley was born at Arnold, Nottinghamshire and died at the Graziers Half Way House in Nottinghamshire.
