= Tom Hunt (cricketer) =

English cricketer

Personal information
- Full name: Thomas Hunt
- Born: 2 September 1819; Chesterfield, Derbyshire, England
- Died: 11 September 1858 (aged 39); Rochdale, Lancashire, England
- Batting: Right-handed
- Bowling: Right-arm roundarm fast

Domestic team information
- Years: Team
- 1845–1851: Yorkshire
- 1849: Lancashire

Career statistics
Competition	First-class
Matches	39
Runs scored	922
Batting average	15.11
100s/50s	1/–
Top score	102
Balls bowled	1,449
Wickets	67
Bowling average	14.94
5 wickets in innings	5
10 wickets in match	1
Best bowling	7/?
Catches/stumpings	33/9
- Source: Cricinfo, 25 July 2019

Thomas Hunt (2 September 1819 – 11 September 1858) was an English first-class cricketer.

Hunt was born at Chesterfield in September 1819. He made his debut in first-class cricket for Yorkshire against Manchester at Manchester in 1845. Hunt played first-class cricket on 39 occasions from 1845 to 1858. In addition to playing for Yorkshire, Hunt also appeared for an All England Eleven, England, Lancashire, Manchester, the North, the Players, Sheffield and a United All England Eleven. In his 39 matches he scored 922 runs at an average of 15.11, with a high score of 102. This score, which was the only time he passed fifty in first-class cricket, came for the North in the North v South fixture of 1856 at Broughton. As a right-arm roundarm fast bowler, he took 67 wickets at a bowling average of 14.94, taking five wickets in an innings on five occasions and ten wickets in a match once. Playing as a wicket-keeper, Hunt made nine stumpings.

Crossing a railway line near Rochdale while returning from a cricket match, he was "overtaken by a train and fearfully mangled", and died shortly afterwards.
