= George Thorpe (cricketer, born 1781) =

English cricketer (1781–1847)

George Thorpe (c. 1781 – 11 May 1847) was an English cricketer who was born in Nottingham and played for Nottingham Cricket Club.

The first mention of Thorpe is in July 1826 when he played for Nottingham against a combined Sheffield and Leicester team on the Darnall Old Ground in Sheffield. Thorpe was number 11 in the batting order and scored 12 and 4 in his two innings. Sheffield and Leicester won by an innings and 203 runs after scoring 379 against Nottingham's scores of 101 and 77. Tom Marsden scored 227 for the combined team.

== Bibliography ==
- Haygarth, Arthur (1996) [1862]. Scores & Biographies, Volume 1 (1744–1826). Kennington: Frederick Lillywhite. ISBN 978-19-00592-23-9.
- Haygarth, Arthur (1997) [1862]. Scores & Biographies, Volume 2 (1827–1840). Kennington: Frederick Lillywhite. ISBN 978-19-00592-23-9.
