= Dearman =

Dearman is a surname. Notable people with the surname include:

- Glyn Dearman (1939–1997), former child actor whose acting career spanned almost two decades
- James Dearman (1808–1854), English professional cricketer
- John Dearman, Grammy Award-winning classical guitarist
- Louise Dearman, British musical theatre performer
