= Dakins =

Dakins may refer to:

- William Dakins (?–1607), English academic and clergyman, Gresham Professor of Divinity and one of the translators of the King James Bible
- HMS Dakins (K550), a British frigate commissioned in the Royal Navy in 1943 and scrapped in 1947

== See also ==
- Dakin (disambiguation)
