= Henry Southern =

Henry Southern may refer to:

- Henry Southern (journalist) (1799–1853), English journalist and diplomat
- Henry Southern (cricketer) (1806–?), English cricketer
- Henry Neville Southern (1908–1986), English ornithologist
