= William Halton (cricketer) =

English cricketer

Personal information
- Full name: William Halton
- Born: 19 January 1837; Yarm, Yorkshire, England
- Died: 24 April 1885 (aged 48); Blackburn, Lancashire, England
- Batting: Unknown

Domestic team information
- Years: Team
- 1861–1862: Yorkshire

Career statistics
Competition	First-class
Matches	8
Runs scored	112
Batting average	10.18
100s/50s	0/0
Top score	19*
Catches/stumpings	4/–
- Source: Cricinfo, 25 June 2019

William Halton (19 January 1837 – 24 April 1885) was an English first-class cricketer.

Halton made his debut in first-class cricket for a combined Yorkshire and Durham cricket team against Nottinghamshire at Stockton-on-Tees in 1858. He made two first-class appearances in 1861 for a United England Eleven against an All England Eleven. In the same season he made his debut for Yorkshire against Surrey at Sheffield, as well as playing for a combined Yorkshire with Stockton-on-Tees cricket team against Cambridgeshire. His final three first-class appearances all came for Yorkshire in 1862. Playing in eight first-class matches, Halton scored 112 runs at an average of 10.18, with a high score of 19 not out.

Halton kept an inn in Stockton-on-Tees in the 1860s. After his first wife died, he moved with his second wife to Blackburn, where he worked as a labourer. He died of bronchitis in April 1885.
