= 1841 English cricket season =

Cricket season review

The 1841 English cricket season was the 15th of the roundarm era. (Note: Any match listed in the ACS' Important Match Guide (1981) is historically important, and therefore of the highest standard, whether or not a scorecard might exist. The same applies to numerous matches discovered by researchers since 1981. For further information, see First-class cricket.) The official foundation of Nottinghamshire County Cricket Club is dated 1841 although the club may already have been in existence since 1835 as a county-wide expansion of the old Nottingham Cricket Club.

== Important matches ==
- 1841 match list

== Events ==
March/April. Formal creation of Nottinghamshire County Cricket Club. The exact date has been lost and it is possible that an informal county club may have been created in 1835 out of the old Nottingham town club.

== Leading batsmen ==
Leading batsmen were: CG Taylor, TA Anson, J Guy, A Mynn, EG Wenman, B Good, C Hawkins, FP Fenner.

== Leading bowlers ==
Alfred Mynn was the leading wicket-taker with 94.

Other leading bowlers were: FW Lillywhite, WR Hillyer, J Cobbett, J Bayley, S Redgate.

== Bibliography ==
- ACS (1981). A Guide to Important Cricket Matches Played in the British Isles 1709–1863. Nottingham: ACS. OCLC 85045528.
- Warner, Pelham (1946). Lords: 1787–1945. London: Harrap. OCLC 877106024.
