= Henry Attenburrow =

English cricketer

Personal information
- Full name: Henry Clinton Attenburrow
- Born: 19 September 1807; Nottingham, Nottinghamshire, England
- Died: 25 September 1881 (aged 74); Saint Brélade, Jersey
- Bowling: Right-arm underarm slow

Domestic team information
- Years: Team
- 1848: Nottingham Cricket Club
- 1847: Nottinghamshire

Career statistics
Competition	First-class
Matches	2
Runs scored	3
Batting average	1.00
100s/50s	0/0
Top score	3
Balls bowled	252
Wickets	15
Bowling average	?
5 wickets in innings	1
10 wickets in match	1
Best bowling	6/?
Catches/stumpings	0/–
- Source: Cricinfo, 20 February 2013

Henry Clinton Attenburrow (19 September 1807 – 25 September 1881) was an English first-class cricketer. Attenburrow's batting style is unknown, though it is known he bowled right-arm underarm slow. He was born in Nottingham, Nottinghamshire.

== Background ==
Attenburrow made a single first-class appearance for Nottinghamshire against England in 1847 at Trent Bridge. In England's first-innings of 105 all out, Attenburrow took four wickets. He opened the batting in Nottinghamshire's first-innings of 176 all out, scoring 3 runs before he was dismissed by Tom Hunt. In England second-innings of 82 all out, he took six wickets. Nottinghamshire were set twelve runs for victory, reaching their target without losing a wicket. The following season he made a single first-class appearance for Nottingham Cricket Club against Sheffield Cricket Club at Trent Bridge. In Sheffield's first-innings of 111 all out, Attenburrow took three wickets, while in Nottingham's first-innings of 36 all out he batted at number ten, where he was dismissed for a duck by Tom Hunt. He took two wickets in Sheffield's second-innings of 81 all out, which set Nottingham a target of 157 for victory. Nottingham were dismissed for 71 in their chase, with Attenburrow again dismissed for a duck by Hunt.

Attenburrow died at Saint Brélade, Jersey on 25 September 1881.
