= Thomas Robinson (cricketer) =

English cricketer

Personal information
- Full name: Thomas Robinson
- Born: 7 September 1837; Redcar, Yorkshire, England
- Died: 3 December 1910 (aged 73); Stockton-on-Tees, County Durham, England

Domestic team information
- Years: Team
- 1862: Yorkshire

Career statistics
Competition	First-class
Matches	4
Runs scored	63
Batting average	7.87
100s/50s	0/0
Top score	33
Balls bowled	112
Wickets	5
Bowling average	6.80
5 wickets in innings	0
10 wickets in match	0
Best bowling	4/26
Catches/stumpings	1/–
- Source: Cricinfo, 25 June 2019

Thomas Robinson (7 September 1837 – 3 December 1910) was an English first-class cricketer.

Robinson was born at Redcar in September 1837. He made his debut in first-class cricket against a combined Yorkshire and Durham cricket team against Nottinghamshire at Stockton-on-Tees in 1858. His next first-class appearance followed three years later when he played for a combined Yorkshire with Stockton-on-Tees cricket team against Cambridgeshire. He made his final two first-class appearances in 1862, playing for Yorkshire against Kent at Sheffield, and for the Players in the Gentlemen v Players fixture at Lord's. Robinson scored 63 runs in his four first-class appearances, with a high score of 33. With the ball he took 5 wickets with best figures of 4 for 26. He died at Stockton-on-Tees in December 1910.
