= Waud =

Waud is a surname. Notable people with the name include:

- Alfred Waud (1828–1891), English-American artist and illustrator
- Brian Waud (1837–1889), English cricketer
- Daryl Waud (born 1993), Canadian football defensive lineman
- William Waud (1832–1878), English-American artist and illustrator
