= Thomas Barker (cricketer, born 1812) =

English cricketer

Thomas Rawson Barker (9 April 1812 – 26 April 1873) was an English cricketer, whose career spanned the 1833 to 1849 seasons. He was an amateur who appeared in only nine matches due to his business commitments. He played for Sheffield Cricket Club, whose team was sometimes called Yorkshire, and for other clubs in the county.

Barker was born in Bakewell, Derbyshire. He was a right-handed batsman and a left-arm medium pace bowler using the roundarm style. He appeared in what is sometimes called the inaugural Yorkshire match at the Hyde Park Ground, Sheffield, in 1833 against Norfolk, although at this time Yorkshire was still the Sheffield Club. In doing so, he became the first non-Yorkshire born player to play cricket for a team called Yorkshire. Barker played in nine important matches from 1833 to 1849, scoring 121 runs at 11 with a top score of 37, and taking 38 wickets at an estimated 7.93, with a best analysis of five for 11.

A lead merchant in Sheffield, Barker served as mayor of the city and, when the Yorkshire County Cricket Club was formed in 1863, he was briefly its first President before handing over to Michael Ellison. He died in Sheffield, aged 61, in 1873.
