= George Jarvis (cricketer) =

English cricketer

George Jarvis (24 June 1800 – 27 March 1880) was an English cricketer who played from 1826 to 1841. He was a brother of Charles Jarvis.

Jarvis was a right-handed batsman and an underarm fast bowler. He played mainly for Nottingham Cricket Club and Nottinghamshire and made 37 known appearances. He represented the Players in the Gentlemen v Players series and played four times for North v. South from 1836 to 1838.

Jarvis scored 814 runs at an average of 12.71, with a highest score of 59. He took 13 catches and bowled 72 recorded deliveries, taking nine wickets and conceding sixteen runs.

== Bibliography ==
- Haygarth, Arthur (1996) [1862]. Scores & Biographies, Volume 1 (1744–1826). Kennington: Frederick Lillywhite. ISBN 978-19-00592-23-9.
- Haygarth, Arthur (1997) [1862]. Scores & Biographies, Volume 2 (1827–1840). Kennington: Frederick Lillywhite. ISBN 978-19-00592-23-9.
