= Nottinghamshire county cricket teams =

Nottinghamshire county cricket teams may refer to:

- Nottingham Cricket Club
- Nottinghamshire County Cricket Club
