= Henry Picard (disambiguation) =

Henry Picard may refer to:

- Henry Picard (1906–1997), American professional golfer
- Henry Picard (Lord Mayor), Lord Mayor of London in 1356 and 1357
- Henry Pickard (1832–1905), English cricketer and clergyman

== See also ==
- Henri Picard
