= John Kettleband =

English cricketer

John Kettleband (22 July 1801 – 3 April 1834) was an English professional cricketer who played from 1826 to 1832. He made nine known appearances for Nottingham Cricket Club, all against Sheffield Cricket Club.

== Bibliography ==
- Haygarth, Arthur (1996) [1862]. Scores & Biographies, Volume 1 (1744–1826). Kennington: Frederick Lillywhite. ISBN 978-19-00592-23-9.
- Haygarth, Arthur (1997) [1862]. Scores & Biographies, Volume 2 (1827–1840). Kennington: Frederick Lillywhite. ISBN 978-19-00592-23-9.
