= Yorkshire county cricket teams =

Yorkshire county cricket teams may refer to:

- Sheffield Cricket Club
- Yorkshire County Cricket Club
