= Dakin =

Dakin may refer to:

== People ==
- Dakin (surname), including a list of people with the name
- Dakin of Sennar (1568–1585/6), Sudanese ruler of the Kingdom of Sennar

== Places ==
- Dakin, Athabasca County, Alberta, Canada
- Dakin Island, an island in the Houtman Abrolhos, Australia
- Dakin Building, in Brisbane, California, United States

== Other uses ==
- R. Dakin & Co., later Applause, a toy company
- Dakin, an historic name for a chemical thought to be element 85 (astatine)

== See also ==
- Dakins (disambiguation)
- Dakini, a type of goddess in Hinduism and Buddhism
- Dakin's solution, an antiseptic
- Dakin oxidation, an organic redox reaction
- Dakin–West reaction, a chemical reaction that transforms an amino-acid into a keto-amide
