= Slinn =

Slinn is a surname. Notable people with the surname include:

- David Slinn (born 1959), British diplomat
- William Slinn (1826–1888), English cricketer
