= Bolsover (disambiguation) =

Bolsover is a town in Derbyshire, England.

Bolsover may also refer to

- Bolsover District, a local government district in Derbyshire, England
- Bolsover (UK Parliament constituency)
- Bolsover, Ontario, Canada

People

- Baron Bolsover, a title in the peerage of the United Kingdom from 1880 to 1977
- Antony Bolsover (born 1972), English snooker player
- George Henry Bolsover (1910-1990), English academic
- Henry Bolsover (1809-1876), English cricketer
- Martin Bolsover, British racing driver

== See also ==
- Bolsover Castle
- Bolsover House, Saskatchewan, Canada
- Bolsover Street, London, England
- Beast of Bolsover, a nickname for British former politician Dennis Skinner
