= Baldwinson =

Baldwinson is a surname. Notable people with the surname include:

- Arthur Baldwinson (1908–1969), Australian architect
- Baldwin Baldwinson (1856–1936), Canadian politician
- Jordan Baldwinson (born 1994), English rugby league footballer
- Samuel Baldwinson (1823–1856), English cricketer

== See also ==
- Baldwin (disambiguation)
