= John Hall (cricketer, born 1815) =

English cricketer

John Hall (11 November 1815 – 17 April 1888) was an English first-class cricketer, active 1844–63, who played for Sheffield and Yorkshire. He played three times against Manchester in 1844 and 1845, and then reappeared for one match against Nottinghamshire at Trent Bridge in 1863. Born in Nottingham, Hall was a right arm slow underarm bowler, who took 13 wickets for 71 runs at an average of 5.46. His best return was 5 for 18 against Manchester in a low scoring game at Moss Lane, on his debut in 1844. A right-handed batsman, he scored 49 runs at 8.16 with a top score of 28 not out against Manchester in 1845. Hall also played at non-first-class county level for Leicestershire and, in one match in 1850, for Shropshire while appearing as a professional for Shrewsbury Cricket Club. Hall died in April 1888 in Retford, aged 62.
