= John Johnson (cricketer, born 1809) =

English cricketer

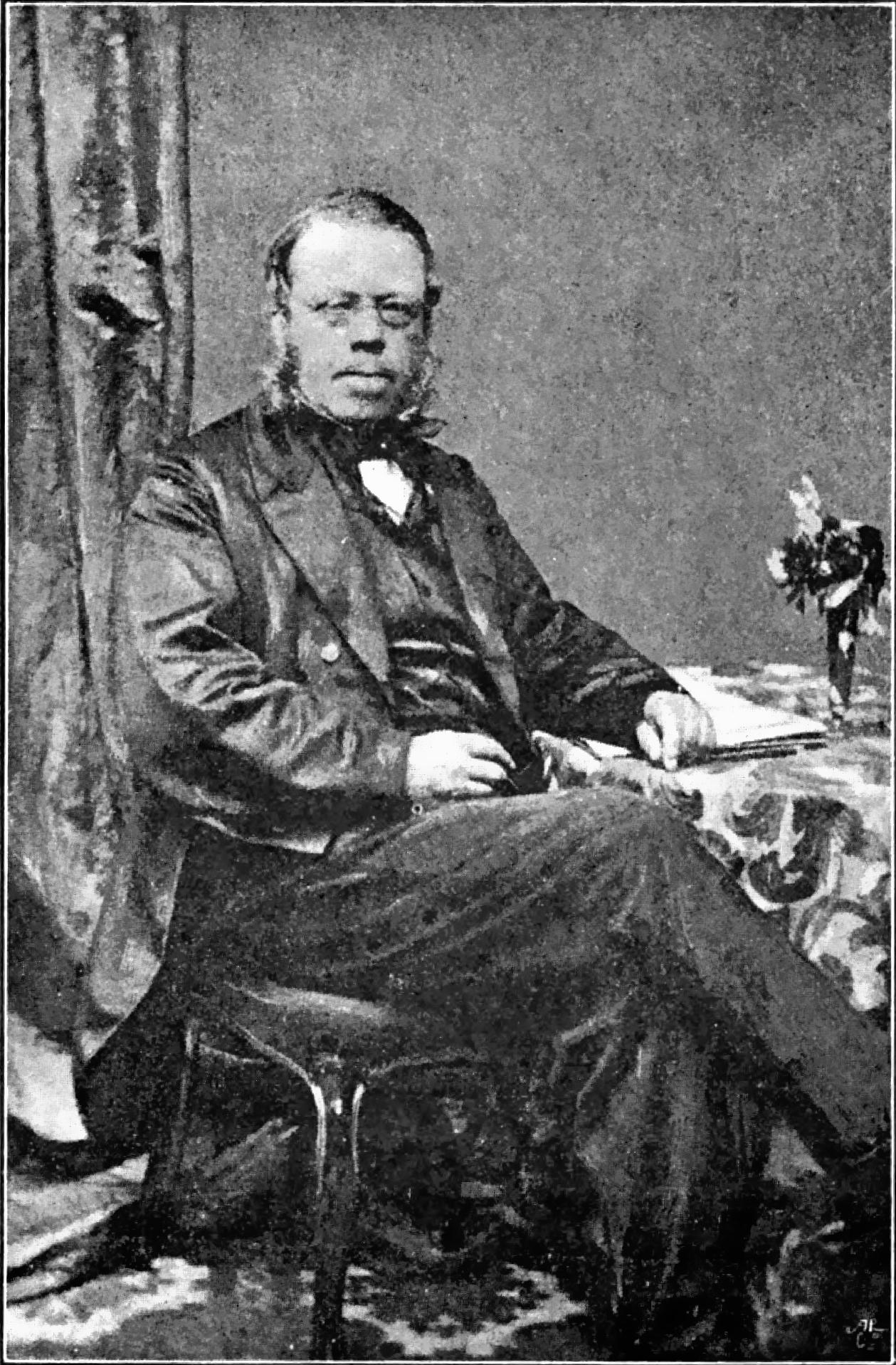

Personal information
- Full name: John Johnson
- Born: 1809; Nottingham, Nottinghamshire, England
- Died: 5 August 1877 (aged 67–68); Bassingfield, Nottinghamshire, England
- Batting: Unknown

Career statistics
Competition	First-class
Matches	2
Runs scored	16
Batting average	5.33
100s/50s	–/–
Top score	6
Catches/stumpings	1/–
- Source: Cricinfo, 31 December 2019

John Johnson (1809 – 5 August 1877) was an English first-class cricketer.

Johnson was born in Nottingham in 1809 and was by profession a solicitor. His interest in cricket began when he played as a schoolboy, and he later made two appearances in first-class cricket for Nottingham in 1848, with both appearances coming against Sheffield. Johnson was the honorary secretary of a number of Nottingham based cricket clubs, and in 1859 he became the honorary secretary of Nottinghamshire County Cricket Club, a post he held for ten years. During his tenure, he was instrumental in the construction of the first pavilion at Trent Bridge. After retiring, he was appointed vice-president to Nottinghamshire County Cricket Club. Johnson died on 5 August 1877 at Bassingfield, Nottinghamshire. Having amassed a large collection of books on cricket during his lifetime, upon his death he left his collection to Richard Daft.
