= Hiram Slack (North of England cricketer) =

English cricketer

Hiram Slack (23 July 1843 – 29 October 1918) was an English cricketer who made one first-class appearance for the North of England cricket team in 1866, while being a prolific club cricketer for Aston, Birmingham, Dudley, Edgbaston and Walsall between 1865 and 1875, as well as playing against county cricket teams as part of invitational XIs and the United All England. His uncle, also named Hiram Slack, played twice for Nottinghamshire.

Slack's only first-class match took place at Lord's Cricket Ground on 2 July 1866. He played a North v South match for the North of England against a South of England team featuring WG Grace and Farmer Bennet, where the latter took twelve wickets in the match, including a career best 8/25, which resulted in a heavy innings defeat for the North. Slack, batting in the tail but not featuring in the bowling attack, made four and three not out.
