= Thomas Charlton (cricketer) =

English cricketer

Thomas Broughton Charlton (15 August 1815 – 20 January 1886) was an English first-class cricketer active 1839–40 who played for Marylebone Cricket Club (MCC) and Nottinghamshire. He was born and died in Chilwell, Nottinghamshire. He appeared in four first-class matches.

== Bibliography ==
- Haygarth, Arthur (1996) [1862]. Scores & Biographies, Volume 1 (1744–1826). Kennington: Frederick Lillywhite. ISBN 978-19-00592-23-9.
- Haygarth, Arthur (1997) [1862]. Scores & Biographies, Volume 2 (1827–1840). Kennington: Frederick Lillywhite. ISBN 978-19-00592-23-9.
