= Isaac Hodgson =

English cricketer

Isaac Hodgson (15 November 1828 – 24 November 1867) was an English cricketer, active 1847–66, who played for Sheffield and Yorkshire.

He also appeared for the North of England (1861–1864), Yorkshire with Stockton-on-Tees (1861), United England Eleven (1863), the Players (1863) and England (1863–1865) as well as county-level below for Shropshire (on one match in 1866), Northumberland and Lincolnshire.

A slow left round-arm bowler, he took 174 wickets at 15.80, with a best of seven for 23 against an England Eleven. He also took six for 44 against Surrey, six for 63 against Cambridgeshire and five for 59 against the South of England. He took five wickets in an innings nine times, and twice claimed ten wickets in a match. A poor right-handed batsman, Hodgson scored 329 runs at 7.47, with a top score of 32 against the South of England.

"Yorkshire", said Richard Daft some years after Hodgson's death, "has always been rich in bowlers, and one of the best was Ike Hodgson. [Wilfred] Rhodes somewhat reminds me of him. Hodgson was perhaps a trifle faster, but he also used to bowl good slows with a break. He had a very good-natured grin, and I remember once that when at Bradford (August 1864) he got me stumped by Ned Stephenson when I had made 80, he consoled me with a smile which was broad enough to put any man in a good humour."

Hodgson was born in Bradford, Yorkshire, England, where he died just past his 39th birthday. It is believed that there exists an epitaph on his Bradford gravestone:

Isaac Hodgson, rest his soul,
Could never bat but always bowl.
Through many years the tourists' skill
Was subjugate to Ikey's will.
They took their stance with vain defiance
Against his subtle skill and science.
Progenitor, great Almus Pater,
Bowler divine, but batting hater.
