= George Smith (cricketer, born 1785) =

English cricketer

George Smith (19 November 1785 – 3 April 1838) was an English cricketer who played for Nottingham Cricket Club from 1817 to 1827. He made three appearances, all for Nottingham, between 1826 and 1827.

== Bibliography ==
- Haygarth, Arthur (1996) [1862]. Scores & Biographies, Volume 1 (1744–1826). Kennington: Frederick Lillywhite. ISBN 978-19-00592-23-9.
- Haygarth, Arthur (1997) [1862]. Scores & Biographies, Volume 2 (1827–1840). Kennington: Frederick Lillywhite. ISBN 978-19-00592-23-9.
