= William Cuttell =

English cricketer

William Cuttell (28 January 1835 – 10 June 1896) was an English cricketer, who played fifteen matches for Sheffield and Yorkshire between 1862 and 1871.

Born in Sheffield, Cuttell took 38 wickets at around 16.50, with a best of 6 for 48 against Surrey. Another good haul, of 5 for 46, came against Lancashire in a Roses Match. He scored 272 runs as a right-handed batsmen, for an average of 12.36 with a best of 56 against Kent.

Cuttell also took 13 wickets for XXII of Wakefield versus All England in 1864. He had various cricketing engagements, including several in Lancashire with Eccles and Bolton. While playing as club professional with Bolton he made a single non-first-class appearance for Shropshire in 1866, taking 9 wickets for no runs.

He was the father of Willis Cuttell, who notably played for Lancashire and England. William Cuttell died in Sheffield, aged 61, in June 1896.
