= William Sheraton =

English cricketer

William Sheraton (dates unknown) was an English cricketer who was associated with Nottingham Cricket Club and made his first-class debut in 1827. He played for Nottingham from 1827 to 1831.

== Bibliography ==
- Haygarth, Arthur (1862). Scores & Biographies, Volume 2 (1827–1840). Lillywhite.
