= Thomas Trueman (cricketer) =

English cricketer

Thomas Trueman (first name and dates unknown) was an English cricketer associated with Nottingham Cricket Club who made his first-class debut in 1827.

== Bibliography ==
- Haygarth, Arthur (1996) [1862]. Scores & Biographies, Volume 1 (1744–1826). Kennington: Frederick Lillywhite. ISBN 978-19-00592-23-9.
- Haygarth, Arthur (1997) [1862]. Scores & Biographies, Volume 2 (1827–1840). Kennington: Frederick Lillywhite. ISBN 978-19-00592-23-9.
