= Humphrey Hopkin =

Humphrey Hopkin (1774 – 11 January 1840) was an English first-class cricketer who made several known appearances in historically important matches from 1791 to 1825. He was born in Nottingham and played for Nottingham Cricket Club. He died in Radford, Nottinghamshire.
