= William Brittain (cricketer) =

William Brittain (dates unknown) was an English professional cricketer who made 2 known appearances in first-class cricket matches in 1800.

== Career ==
He was mainly associated with Nottingham.

== External sources ==
- CricketArchive record
