= John Day (cricketer, born 1812) =

English cricketer

John Day (5 March 1812 – unknown) was an English first-class cricketer active 1829–35 who played for Nottingham Cricket Club (aka Nottinghamshire). He was born in Nottingham and died in (unknown). He appeared in eight first-class matches.
