= Thomas Brownhill =

English cricketer

Thomas Brownhill (10 October 1838 – 6 January 1915) was an English cricketer who played fourteen matches for Sheffield and Yorkshire from 1862 to 1871.

Born in Ecclesfield, Sheffield, Yorkshire, England, Brownhill was a right-handed batsman who scored 202 runs at 9.18 with a best of 25 against Surrey, against whom he played half his games.

During his first-class career, he scored over 200 runs in 14 matches, with his highest individual score being 25 against Surrey. He also took part in assorted important fixtures involving Sheffield sides of that era.

He died, aged 76, in Wortley, West Yorkshire.
