= Henry Wright (cricketer) =

English cricketer and umpire

Personal information
- Full name: George Henry Wright
- Born: 15 November 1822; Sheffield, Yorkshire, England
- Died: 28 November 1893 (aged 71); Ecclesall, Yorkshire, England
- Batting: Right-handed
- Bowling: Unknown

Domestic team information
- Years: Team
- 1849–1855: Yorkshire

Career statistics
Competition	First-class
Matches	43
Runs scored	741
Batting average	10.15
100s/50s	–/1
Top score	68
Balls bowled	2,371
Wickets	88
Bowling average	10.36
5 wickets in innings	4
10 wickets in match	–
Best bowling	7/38
Catches/stumpings	48/–
- Source: Cricinfo, 10 September 2019

George Henry Wright (15 November 1822 – 28 November 1893) was an English first-class cricketer and umpire.

Wright was born at Sheffield in November 1822. He made his debut in first-class cricket for an England XI against Nottinghamshire at Trent Bridge in 1847. The following year he made four first-class appearances for Sheffield, playing twice each against Manchester and Nottingham. He played first-class cricket for sides representing Yorkshire/Sheffield on nineteen occasions until 1855. Additionally, he played nine first-class matches for the North between 1851–57, five matches each for an England XI and a United Eleven until 1857, two matches each for an All England Eleven and Manchester in 1857–58, and one appearance for the Players in the Gentlemen v Players match of 1856. In a total 44 first-class matches, Wright scored 741 runs at an average of 10.15 and a high score of 68. With the ball, he took 88 wickets at a bowling average of 10.36. He took five wickets in an innings on four occasions, with best figures of 7 for 38 for Sheffield against Manchester in 1852.

In addition to playing, Wright also stood as umpire in sixteen first-class matches between 1860–72. He was the groundsman at Bramall Lane from 1866 until his death in November 1893.
