= George Galloway (cricketer) =

English cricketer

Personal information
- Full name: George Gibson Galloway
- Born: 22 February 1803 (christened); Nottingham, Nottinghamshire, England
- Died: 29 August 1867; Nottingham, Nottinghamshire, England

Domestic team information
- Years: Team
- 1837: Nottingham Cricket Club

George Gibson Galloway (22 February 1803 (date christened) – 29 August 1867) was an English cricketer. Galloway's batting style is unknown. He was born in Nottingham, and died there.

Galloway made his debut for Nottingham Cricket Club (aka Nottinghamshire)] against Sussex in 1837. He made two further appearances during the season for Nottingham, against Kent and Sussex. He also made a single appearance in that season for the Gentlemen of Nottinghamshire against the Players of Nottinghamshire. In his four appearances, Galloway scored 17 runs at an average of 2.83, with a high score of 11.
