= Thomas Ellis (cricketer) =

English cricketer

Personal information
- Full name: Thomas Ellis
- Born: 1 March 1828; Birmingham, Warwickshire, England
- Died: Unknown
- Batting: Unknown
- Bowling: Unknown

Domestic team information
- Years: Team
- 1849–1851: Yorkshire

Thomas Ellis (1 March 1828 – date of death unknown) was an English cricketer.

Ellis was born at Birmingham in March 1828. He played for Yorkshire from 1849–51, making eight appearances. He made two appearances in 1849 against Lancashire, following these up with a single appearance against an All England Eleven in 1850. He made four further appearances in 1851, with two appearances each against Lancashire and Surrey. He scored a total of 75 runs in his eight matches, with a high score of 19 not out. As a bowler, he took 17 wickets at a bowling average of 8.20, with one five wicket haul against Lancashire in 1851. In addition to playing cricket, he also stood as an umpire in a single match between Manchester and Sheffield in 1852.
