= Andrew Crossland =

English cricketer (1816–1902)

Personal information
- Full name: Andrew Crossland
- Born: 30 November 1816; Dalton, Yorkshire, England
- Died: 17 November 1902 (aged 85); Hull, Yorkshire, England
- Batting: Right-handed
- Bowling: Right-arm roundarm medium
- Role: Occasional wicket-keeper

Domestic team information
- Years: Team
- 1844–1855: Yorkshire

Andrew Crossland (30 November 1816 – 17 November 1902) was an English cricketer, active 1844–1855, who played for Sheffield Cricket Club. Born in Dalton, Huddersfield, he died in November 1902 in Hull. His son Samuel Crossland also played.
