= Joseph Berry (cricketer) =

English cricketer

- Born: 29 November 1829; Dalton, Huddersfield
- Died: 20 April 1894 (aged 64)
- Occupation: Cricketer

Joseph Berry (29 November 1829 – 20 April 1894) was an English cricketer, active 1861–74, who played for Sheffield and Yorkshire. He made five appearances as a right-handed batsman, scoring 82 runs at 10.25 with a highest score of 30. He held two catches but his right-arm medium pace bowling was not called upon.

Berry was born in Dalton, Huddersfield, and made his debut in 1861, playing twice against Surrey. He appeared against Kent in 1864, and Cambridgeshire in 1865, his final appearance coming nine years later for Yorkshire against an England Eleven at Fartown in July 1874. It was in this final match that he made his highest score of 30, batting at number 9, as Yorkshire ran out winners by an innings and 11 runs.

Berry umpired at least four matches in cricket, including both of the Roses Matches in 1877, and two games Yorkshire played against the touring Australians in 1878 and 1880. He died, aged 64, at Fartown, Huddersfield in April 1894.
