= James Brittain =

English cricketer

James Brittain (born 25 September 1785) was an English cricketer who was associated with Nottingham Cricket Club and made his debut in 1827. He played for Nottingham from 1813 to 1829.

== Bibliography ==
- Haygarth, Arthur (1996) [1862]. Scores & Biographies, Volume 1 (1744–1826). Kennington: Frederick Lillywhite. ISBN 978-19-00592-23-9.
- Haygarth, Arthur (1997) [1862]. Scores & Biographies, Volume 2 (1827–1840). Kennington: Frederick Lillywhite. ISBN 978-19-00592-23-9.
