= William Hewitt (cricketer) =

English cricketer

William Hewitt (17 January 1795 – 1870) was an English cricketer who was associated with Nottingham Cricket Club and made his debut in 1827. He played for Nottingham from 1817 to 1829.

== Bibliography ==
- Haygarth, Arthur (1996) [1862]. Scores & Biographies, Volume 1 (1744–1826). Kennington: Frederick Lillywhite. ISBN 978-19-00592-23-9.
- Haygarth, Arthur (1997) [1862]. Scores & Biographies, Volume 2 (1827–1840). Kennington: Frederick Lillywhite. ISBN 978-19-00592-23-9.
