= John Wright (Sheffield cricketer) =

English cricketer

John Wright (27 November 1796 – 18 November 1857) was an English cricketer who was associated with Sheffield Cricket Club and made his debut in 1827. He played for Sheffield from 1822 to 1828.

== Bibliography ==
- Haygarth, Arthur (1996) [1862]. Scores & Biographies, Volume 1 (1744–1826). Kennington: Frederick Lillywhite. ISBN 978-19-00592-23-9.
- Haygarth, Arthur (1997) [1862]. Scores & Biographies, Volume 2 (1827–1840). Kennington: Frederick Lillywhite. ISBN 978-19-00592-23-9.
