= Thomas Dakin (cricketer) =

English cricketer

Personal information
- Full name: Thomas Dakin
- Born: 23 November 1829; Sheffield, Yorkshire, England
- Died: Unknown
- Batting: Unknown

Domestic team information
- Years: Team
- 1851–1862: Yorkshire

Career statistics
Competition	First-class
Matches	5
Runs scored	54
Batting average	7.71
100s/50s	–/–
Top score	16
Catches/stumpings	2/–
- Source: Cricinfo, 3 February 2020

Thomas Dakin (23 November 1829 – date of death unknown) was an English first-class cricketer.

Dakin was born at Sheffield in November 1829. He played first-class cricket for Yorkshire from 1851–1862, making five appearances. He made three appearances in 1851, against an All England Eleven, Surrey and Lancashire. He made a further appearance against an All England Eleven in 1852, before making a final first-class appearance a decade later against Surrey. He scored a total of 54 runs in his five matches, with a high score of 16.
