= Edwin Dawson =

English cricketer

Edwin Dawson (1 May 1835 – 1 December 1888) was an English first-class cricketer, who played in sixteen matches for Sheffield Cricket Club and Yorkshire between 1862 and 1874.

Born in Dalton, Huddersfield, Yorkshire, England, Dawson was a right-handed batsman, who met with little success during his chronologically long career, scoring 256 runs at 9.84, with a top score of 30 against an All England Eleven. His round arm medium pace bowling was not called upon in the first-class game. He was with Bradford from 1872 to 1874, and helped to develop George Ulyett. At one time a warehouseman in Bradford, he kept the Granby Hotel.

He umpired several first-class matches after retiring from the game. These included Players of the North v England XI at Dewsbury in 1878, Tom Emmett's XI v Alfred Shaw's XI at Park Avenue Cricket Ground, Bradford in 1881, plus Nottinghamshire and Yorkshire versus the Rest of England in 1883.

Living latterly in Listerhills, Dawson died of heart disease whilst watching a rugby union match between Bradford and Batley, in December 1888.
