= Jonathan Joy =

English cricketer

- Born: 29 December 1826; Preston Bottoms, Knaresborough
- Died: 27 September 1889 (aged 62); Middlesbrough
- Occupation: first-class cricketer

Jonathan Joy (29 December 1826 – 27 September 1889) was an English first-class cricketer, active 1849–1867, who played for Sheffield and Yorkshire. He also played first-class cricket for the North of England (1854–1864) and Yorkshire with Stockton-on-Tees (1861).

Born in Preston Bottoms, Knaresborough, Joy scored 283 runs, with a best score of 74 against Kent in 1864, at an average of 14.50. He took one wicket with his right arm, round arm, fast bowling against the South of England at a total cost of 56.00. He also took three catches. He also umpired one first-class match, Yorkshire and Durham versus Nottinghamshire, at Portrack Lane, Stockton-on-Tees, in 1858. Joy died in September 1889, in Middlesbrough.
