= Charles Brown (cricketer, born 1815) =

English cricketer

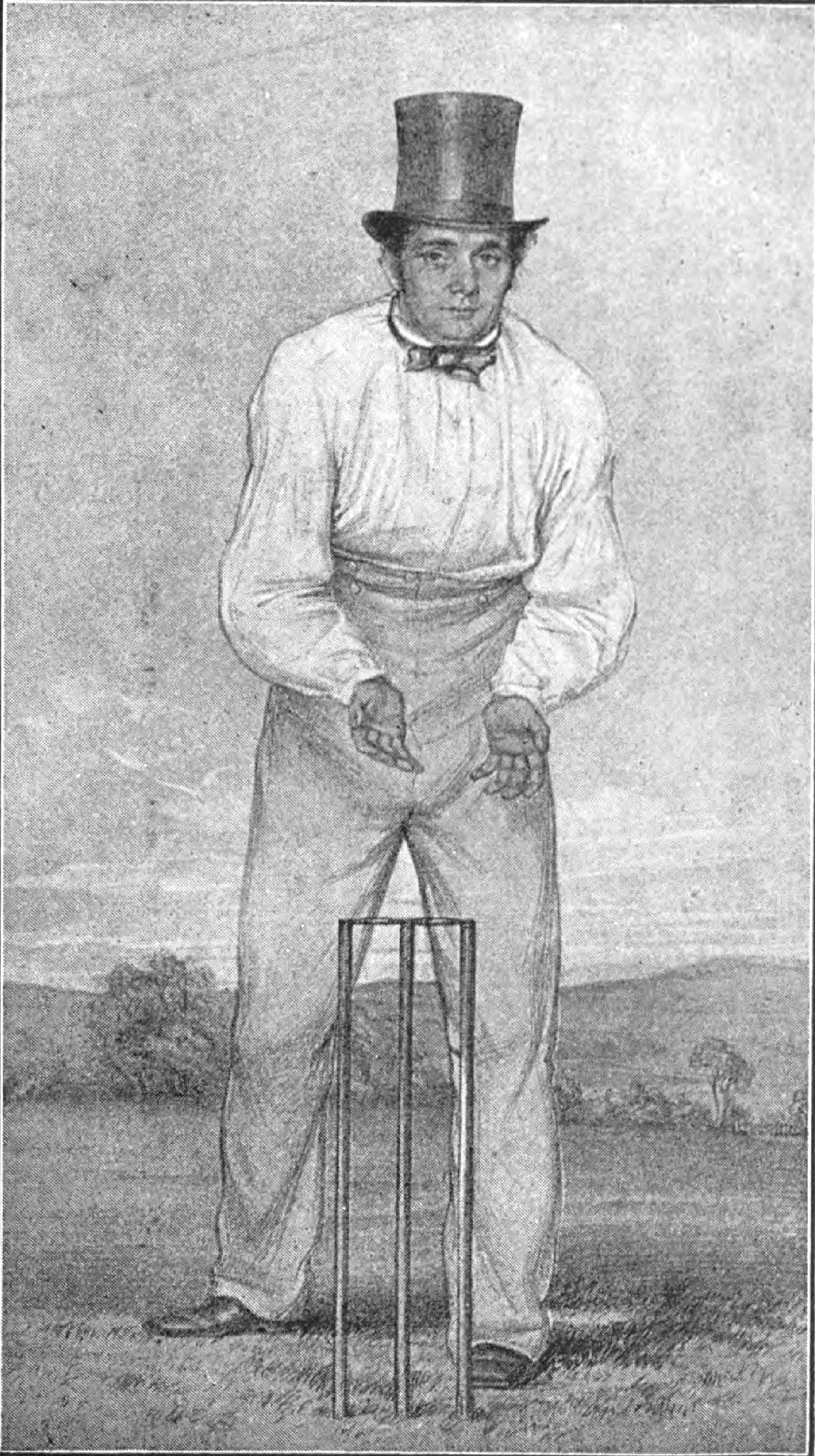
Charles Brown

Charles Brown (22 January 1815 – 28 September 1875) was an English first-class cricketer active 1861 who played for Nottingham and Nottinghamshire as a wicketkeeper. He was born and died in Nottingham.
