= Jonas Warwick =

English cricketer

Jonas Bettison Warwick (1803 – 9 August 1873) was an English first-class cricketer active 1843–48 who played for Nottingham and Nottinghamshire. He was born in Woodborough, Nottinghamshire and died in Southwell, Nottinghamshire. A wicketkeeper, he played in eight first-class matches.
