= William Barber (Sheffield cricketer) =

English cricketer

William Barber (born 29 July 1797) was an English cricketer, active from 1826 to 1828. He was mainly associated with Sheffield Cricket Club and made five known appearances in important matches.

== Bibliography ==
- Haygarth, Arthur (1996) [1862]. Scores & Biographies, Volume 1 (1744–1826). Kennington: Frederick Lillywhite. ISBN 978-19-00592-23-9.
- Haygarth, Arthur (1997) [1862]. Scores & Biographies, Volume 2 (1827–1840). Kennington: Frederick Lillywhite. ISBN 978-19-00592-23-9.
