= George Rawlins =

English cricketer

Personal information
- Full name: George Rawlins
- Born: 22 September 1803; Sheffield
- Died: 21 October 1848 (aged 45); Sheffield

Domestic team information
- Years: Team
- 1826–1836: Sheffield
- Source: CricketArchive

George Rawlins (22 September 1803 – 21 October 1848) was an English cricketer. He was associated with Sheffield Cricket Club and was recorded in 18 matches between 1826 and 1836. Principally a bowler, though of unknown type, he took 41 wickets with a best return of 5/45, one of two occasions when he took five wickets in an innings. He scored a total of 137 runs with a highest score of 12.
