= Joseph Gilbert (cricketer) =

Joseph Gilbert (dates unknown) was an English professional cricketer who made 4 known appearances in first-class cricket matches from 1789 to 1792.

== Career ==
He was mainly associated with Nottingham.
