= John Berry (cricketer) =

English cricketer

John Berry (10 January 1823 – 26 February 1895) was an English first-class cricketer, active 1849–67, who played for Sheffield and Yorkshire sides both before and after the formation of the county club.

Born in Dalton, Huddersfield, Berry was a right-handed batsman and a medium pace roundarm bowler. In total, he scored 1,069 first-class runs, with a top score of 78 against Kent, and another score of 51 against an England XI. He took 40 wickets, with a best analysis of six for 31 against Surrey. Berry died in February 1895 at Haslingden, Lancashire, aged 72 years. His uncle, George Berry, also played first-class cricket for Yorkshire sides.
