= George Smith (cricketer, born 1799) =

English cricketer

George Smith (c. 1799 – 15 September 1839) was an English cricketer who was associated with Sheffield Cricket Club and made his debut in 1827. He played for Sheffield from 1827 to 1836.

== Bibliography ==
- Haygarth, Arthur (1996) [1862]. Scores & Biographies, Volume 1 (1744–1826). Kennington: Frederick Lillywhite. ISBN 978-19-00592-23-9.
- Haygarth, Arthur (1997) [1862]. Scores & Biographies, Volume 2 (1827–1840). Kennington: Frederick Lillywhite. ISBN 978-19-00592-23-9.
