= Thomas Deakin =

English cricketer

Thomas Deakin (born 1790 and christened 2 May 1790; details of death unknown) was an English first-class cricketer, active 1833–1836, who played for Sheffield Cricket Club and for Yorkshire.
