= John Foxcraft =

English cricketer (1806–1853)

John Foxcraft (16 October 1806 – 26 January 1853) was an English first-class cricketer active 1837–42 who played for Nottingham Cricket Club (aka Nottinghamshire). He was born and died in Nottingham. He appeared in four first-class matches.

== Bibliography ==
- Haygarth, Arthur (1862). Scores & Biographies, Volume 2 (1827–1840). Lillywhite.
