= Thomas Redgate =

English cricketer

Personal information
- Full name: Thomas Blatherwick Redgate
- Born: 6 August 1809; Calverton, Nottinghamshire
- Died: 16 February 1874 (aged 64); Weston-on-Trent, Nottinghamshire

Domestic team information
- Years: Team
- 1840: Nottinghamshire XI
- FC debut: 15 June 1840 Notts v Sussex
- Last FC: 27 July 1840 Notts v Sussex
- Source: CricketArchive, 22 June 2025

Thomas Blatherwick Redgate (6 August 1809 – 16 February 1874) was an English solicitor and cricketer who played for two first-class matches for Nottinghamshire XIs in 1840.

Born at Calverton in Nottinghamshire in 1809, Redgate worked professionally as a solicitor, practicing at Tuxford. He played cricket between 1825 and 1865, including, from 1854 in the Newark-on-Trent area where he owned a 60 acres (24 ha) estate at Scarthing Moor near Weston-on-Trent. Both of his first-class matches occurred during the 1840 season. He scored a total of two runs from four innings.

Redgate died at Weston-on-Trent in 1874. He was aged 64.
