= Charles Webster (cricketer) =

English cricketer

Charles Webster (9 June 1838 – 6 January 1881) was an English cricketer, active 1858–68, who played for Sheffield and Yorkshire. Born in Ecclesall, Sheffield, Webster was a right-handed batsman, who scored 30 runs at an average of 7.50, with a best score of 10. He also held two catches. He died in Ecclesall, in January 1881.
