= Charles Dearman =

English cricketer

Charles Dearman (born 1800, Sheffield; details of death unknown) was an English cricketer who was associated with Sheffield Cricket Club and made his debut in 1828. His brother was James Dearman.

== Bibliography ==
- Haygarth, Arthur (1862). Scores & Biographies, Volume 2 (1827–1840). Lillywhite.
