= Samuel Crossland =

English cricketer

Samuel Moorhouse Crossland (16 August 1851 – 11 April 1906) was an English first-class cricketer, who played four matches for Yorkshire County Cricket Club between 1883 and 1886.

Born in Leeds, Yorkshire, England, Crossland was a wicket-keeper, who took three catches and completed five stumpings. He scored 32 runs as a right hand lower order batsman, with a best of 20 against Kent, at an average of 8.00.

His father, Andrew Crossland, had played in eight first-class matches for Yorkshire (before the formation of the County Championship) from 1844 to 1855.

Samuel Crossland died in April 1906 in Wakefield, Yorkshire.
