= Charles Goodall (cricketer) =

English cricketer (1782–1872)

Charles Goodall (26 October 1782 – December 1872) was an English cricketer who played for Nottingham Cricket Club from 1813 to 1827. He made one appearance for Nottingham in 1826.

== Bibliography ==
- Haygarth, Arthur (1996) [1862]. Scores & Biographies, Volume 1 (1744–1826). Kennington: Frederick Lillywhite. ISBN 978-19-00592-23-9.
- Haygarth, Arthur (1997) [1862]. Scores & Biographies, Volume 2 (1827–1840). Kennington: Frederick Lillywhite. ISBN 978-19-00592-23-9.
