= James Porter (cricketer) =

English cricketer

Personal information
- Full name: James Porter
- Born: Unknown
- Died: Unknown
- Batting: Unknown
- Bowling: Unknown

Domestic team information
- Years: Team
- 1844–1845: Yorkshire

Career statistics
Competition	First-class
Matches	3
Runs scored	24
Batting average	6.00
100s/50s	–/–
Top score	17
Balls bowled	18
Wickets	–
Bowling average	–
5 wickets in innings	–
10 wickets in match	–
Best bowling	–
Catches/stumpings	1/–
- Source: Cricinfo, 30 November 2013

James Porter (dates of birth and death unknown) was an English cricketer. Porter's batting and bowling styles are unknown.

Porter made his first-class debut for Sheffield Cricket Club (aka Yorkshire) against Manchester in 1844, with him making two further first-class appearances against the same opposition in 1845. He scored a total of 24 runs in his three matches, averaging 6 runs per innings and with a highest score of 17.
