= Michael Ellison =

English cricketer and sports administrator

Michael Joseph Ellison
- Born: 1 June 1817; Worksop, Nottinghamshire, England
- Died: 12 July 1898 (aged 81); Sheffield, Yorkshire, England
- Occupations: Cricketer, sports administrator, businessman
- Years active: 1846–1897
- Known for: First Chairman of Sheffield United; 2nd President of Yorkshire County Cricket Club
- Notable work: President of Yorkshire County Cricket Club (1864–1897); Chairman of Sheffield United (1889–1896)

Michael Joseph Ellison (1 June 1817 – 12 July 1898) was an English first-class cricketer, sports administrator, and businessman. He played for Sheffield and Nottinghamshire between 1846 and 1855, before becoming a leading administrator in English sport. Ellison played a central role in the formation of Yorkshire County Cricket Club and later served as its long-standing President. He is also widely recognised as the first chairman of Sheffield United Football Club following its foundation in 1889.

== Early life and background ==
Ellison was born in Worksop, Nottinghamshire, in 1817. His family had connections to estate management, and he later became an agent for the Duke of Norfolk, whose landholdings included areas of Sheffield. This role placed him at the centre of Sheffield’s civic and industrial development during the 19th century.

He settled in Sheffield at a young age, where his involvement in local business and sport brought him into contact with leading figures in cricket and, later, football.

== Cricket career ==
Ellison was an active first-class cricketer between 1846 and 1855. He played in 16 important matches as a right-handed batsman, representing Sheffield Cricket Club and Nottinghamshire.

Although not a leading player statistically, he was considered a dependable contributor and described as "useful". He scored 195 runs in 28 innings at an average of 6.96. He also bowled occasionally, taking one wicket, and recorded one catch as a fielder.

His playing career took place during a transitional period in English cricket, when informal regional sides were evolving into organised county teams.

== Bramall Lane and Sheffield cricket ==
Ellison’s most important contribution to sport came through administration. In 1854, while acting as agent to the Duke of Norfolk, he arranged for land at Bramall Lane to be leased for the construction of a cricket ground.

He was instrumental in organising the Sheffield United Cricket Club and oversaw the development of the ground, which opened in 1855. Bramall Lane would go on to become one of the most historically significant sporting venues in the world, hosting both cricket and football.

== Yorkshire County Cricket Club ==
Ellison was a key figure in the foundation of Yorkshire County Cricket Club in 1863. He initially served as Treasurer before becoming President in 1864.

He remained President until 1897, overseeing the club’s development into one of the strongest sides in England. Although T. R. Barker was nominally the first President, Ellison is often regarded as the club’s effective founding leader.

He also played a major role in bringing Martin Hawke, 7th Baron Hawke to Yorkshire, where Hawke became captain and helped transform the team into a disciplined and successful unit.

== Association with Sheffield United ==
Ellison’s influence extended into football with the formation of Sheffield United Football Club in 1889. The club was established by members of the Sheffield United Cricket Club at Bramall Lane to provide sporting activity during the winter months.

Ellison became the club’s first chairman, bringing administrative experience and stability to the newly formed organisation.

=== Early seasons (1889–1892) ===
During Ellison’s chairmanship, Sheffield United rapidly developed into a competitive football club:

- In its first season (1889–90), the club competed primarily in cup competitions, including the FA Cup, where they recorded notable victories before suffering a heavy defeat to Bolton Wanderers.
- By the 1890–91 season, Sheffield United had joined the Midland Counties League, finishing fifth as they attempted to establish consistency and strengthen their squad.
- In 1891–92, with Ellison still serving as chairman, the club competed in the Northern League and improved to a third-place finish, while also winning both the Sheffield Challenge Cup and the Wharncliffe Charity Cup.

These early years were characterised by experimentation in player recruitment, including the use of amateur and professional players, and a heavy schedule of friendly matches alongside competitive fixtures.

Ellison’s leadership during this formative period helped establish Sheffield United as a stable and ambitious club. Within a few years of his tenure, the club joined the Football League (1892) and quickly rose to prominence, eventually winning the League Championship in 1897–98 and the FA Cup in 1899.

== Business and civic life ==
Outside sport, Ellison worked as a land agent and businessman, primarily managing estates on behalf of the Duke of Norfolk. His work contributed to the development of Sheffield during the Industrial Revolution, particularly in the provision of land for recreational and sporting use.

== Legacy ==
Michael Ellison is regarded as a major figure in the development of organised sport in Yorkshire. His contributions include:

- Establishing Bramall Lane as a major sporting venue
- Founding and leading Yorkshire County Cricket Club
- Serving as the first chairman of Sheffield United Football Club

His work bridged cricket and football at a formative stage in their histories and helped establish Sheffield as one of the key centres of English sport.

== Bibliography ==
- Birley, Derek (1999). A Social History of English Cricket. Aurum. ISBN 1-85410-710-0.
- Hodgson, Derek (1989). The Official History of Yorkshire County Cricket Club. The Crowood Press. ISBN 1852232749.
- Kilburn, J. M. (1970). A History of Yorkshire Cricket. Stanley Paul. ISBN 0091011108.
