= Dakin (surname) =

Dakin is a surname. Notable people with the surname include:

- Alec Naylor Dakin (1912–2003), cryptographer, Egyptologist and schoolmaster
- Christine Dakin (born 1949), American dancer, teacher and director
- Glenn Dakin (born 1960), British cartoonist and author
- Henry Drysdale Dakin (1880–1952), English chemist after whom is named Dakin's solution and Dakin oxidation
- Henry H. Dakin (1870–1956), provincial politician from Alberta, Canada
- James H. Dakin (1806–1852), American architect
- Janet Wilder Dakin (1910–1994), American philanthropist and zoologist
- Jonathan Dakin (born 1973), English cricketer
- Nic Dakin (born 1955), British politician
- Nigel Dakin (born 1964), Soldier, Diplomat and Governor of the Turks and Caicos Islands
- Rhys Dakin (born 2004), Australian-American football player
- Thomas Dakin (cricketer) (1829–?), English cricketer
- Thomas Dakin (distiller) (c.1736–c.1790), English distiller and founder of Greenall's Gin
- Tim Dakin (born 1958), Bishop of Winchester, England
- William H. Dakin (1816–1892), American politician in Wisconsin
- William John Dakin (1883–1950), British-Australian biologist
