= George Wheatcroft =

English cricketer

George Wheatcroft (25 December 1799 – 17 August 1860) was an English cricketer with possibly amateur status who was active from 1831 to 1844. He was born in Sheffield and died in Newark, New Jersey. He made his debut in 1831 and appeared in one match as an unknown handedness batsman whose bowling style is unknown, playing for Sheffield Cricket Club. He scored three runs with a highest score of 3 and took no wickets. He later moved to the USA where he was involved with the St George's Cricket Club in Manhattan.

== Bibliography ==
- Haygarth, Arthur (1996) [1862]. Scores & Biographies, Volume 1 (1744–1826). Kennington: Frederick Lillywhite. ISBN 978-19-00592-23-9.
- Haygarth, Arthur (1997) [1862]. Scores & Biographies, Volume 2 (1827–1840). Kennington: Frederick Lillywhite. ISBN 978-19-00592-23-9.
