= New Ground, Norwich =

Former cricket ground in Norwich, England

New Ground
Ground information
- Location: Norwich, Norfolk
- Country: England
- Establishment: 1829 (first recorded match)

Team information
Norfolk	(1834)
- As of 16 August 2010; Source: Ground profile

New Ground was a cricket venue in Norwich, Norfolk. The first recorded match on the ground was in 1829 when Norfolk played Suffolk in a minor match. The ground was the venue for two county matches, both against Yorkshire, one in 1834 and the other in 1836.

The final recorded match held on the ground came in 1888 between the Gentlemen of Norfolk and the Parsees cricket team during their 1888 tour of England.
