= HMS Dakins =

Frigate of the Royal Navy

History

United States
- Name: unnamed (DE-85)
- Ordered: 10 January 1942
- Builder: Bethlehem-Hingham Shipyard, Hingham, Massachusetts
- Laid down: 23 June 1943
- Renamed: Dakins 1943
- Namesake: British name assigned in anticipation of transfer to United Kingdom
- Launched: 18 September 1943
- Completed: 23 November 1943
- Commissioned: never
- Fate: Transferred to United Kingdom 23 November 1943
- Stricken: 7 February 1947

United Kingdom
- Name: HMS Dakins (K550)
- Namesake: Captain George Dakins (Note: English naval officer who commanded English ship Advice during the Anglo-Dutch Wars)
- Acquired: 23 November 1943
- Commissioned: 23 November 1943
- Identification: Pennant number K550
- Fate: Constructive total loss after damage of 25 December 1944; Sold for scrapping 9 January 1947

General characteristics
- Displacement: 1,400 long tons (1,422 t)
- Length: 306 ft (93 m)
- Beam: 36 ft 9 in (11.2 m)
- Draught: 9 ft (2.7 m)
- Propulsion: Two Foster-Wheeler Express "D"-type water-tube boilers; GE 13,500 shp (10,070 kW) steam turbines and generators (9,200 kW); Electric motors for 12,000 shp (8,900 kW); Two shafts
- Speed: 24 knots (44 km/h)
- Range: 5,500 nautical miles (10,200 km) at 15 knots (28 km/h)
- Complement: 186
- Sensors & processing systems: SA & SL type radars; Type 144 series Asdic; MF Direction Finding antenna; HF Direction Finding Type FH 4 antenna
- Armament: 3 × 3 in (76 mm) /50 Mk.22 guns; 1 × twin Bofors 40 mm mount Mk.I; 7–16 × 20 mm Oerlikon guns; Mark 10 Hedgehog anti-submarine mortar; Depth charges; QF 2-pounder naval gun

HMS Dakins (K550) was a Captain-class frigate of the Royal Navy during the Second World War. Built as the Buckley-class destroyer escort DE-85 intended for the United States Navy, she was transferred to the Royal Navy in 1943 under the terms of Lend-Lease.

Damaged by a mine in late 1944, she was not repaired before the end of the war. Following the war, she was used as a depot ship until sold for scrapping.

== Construction and transfer ==
The still-unnamed ship was laid down as the U.S. Navy destroyer escort DE-85 by Bethlehem-Hingham Shipyard, Inc., in Hingham, Massachusetts, on 23 June 1943. Allocated to the United Kingdom, she received the British name Dakins and was launched on 18 September 1943. She was transferred to the United Kingdom upon completion on 23 November 1943.

== Service history ==
She was commissioned into service in the Royal Navy as the frigate HMS Dakins (pennant number K550) on 23 November 1943 simultaneously with her transfer from the US. The ship served on patrol and escort duty.

On 25 December 1944, she struck a mine in the North Sea 14 nautical miles (26 km) northwest of Ostend, Belgium, at 51°25′00″N 002°44′00″E. Although heavily damaged, she managed to limp back to Harwich on the east coast of England.

After sufficient repairs to make her seaworthy, Dakins steamed to Antwerp, Belgium, with a skeleton crew and docked at the John Cockerill shipyard in Antwerp's Hoboken district for assessment of what further repairs she required. Over the five to six months she was moored at Hoboken, no repairs began due to disruptions to port operations by German V-1 flying bomb and V-2 rocket attacks, and in the end plans to repair her were abandoned. After Victory in Europe Day ( 8 May 1945), she steamed back to Harwich, where she served as a depot ship for smaller ships and craft being laid up there.

== Disposal ==
Dakins was declared a constructive total loss and was sold on 9 January 1947 for scrapping in the Netherlands. The U.S. Navy struck her from its Naval Vessel Register on 7 February 1947.
