= Henry Pickard =

English cricketer and clergyman

Personal information
- Full name: Henry Adair Pickard
- Born: 12 May 1832; Worksop, Nottinghamshire, England
- Died: 28 September 1905 (aged 73); Oxford, Oxfordshire, England
- Batting: Unknown

Career statistics
Competition	First-class
Matches	2
Runs scored	50
Batting average	16.66
100s/50s	0/0
Top score	34
Catches/stumpings	0/–
- Source: Cricinfo, 6 August 2019

Henry Adair Pickard (12 May 1832 – 28 September 1905) was an English first-class cricketer and clergyman.

The son of Henry William Adair, he was born in Worksop in May 1832. He was educated at Rugby School, before going up to Christ Church, Oxford. He made two appearances in first-class cricket while a student at Oxford, but did not appear for Oxford University. His first appearance came in 1852 for Sheffield against Manchester at Manchester, with his second appearance coming the following season for the Gentlemen of England against the Gentlemen of Marylebone Cricket Club at Lord's.

After graduating from Oxford in 1855, Pickard became an Anglican clergyman. He later served as an inspector of schools in 1864. Pickard died at his home along the Banbury Road in Oxford in September 1905.
