= George Dawson (cricketer) =

English cricketer

George Edward Dawson (19 March 1799 – 3 May 1843) was an English professional cricketer, who played from 1827 to 1836. Born in Sheffield, Yorkshire, he was mainly associated with Sheffield Cricket Club, and made eight known appearances.

He died in Sheffield in May 1843.
