= Thomas Heath (cricketer) =

English cricketer

Thomas Heath (10 December 1806 – 16 October 1872) was an English cricketer who played from 1828 to 1848.

A right-handed batsman and wicket-keeper who played for Nottingham and Nottinghamshire, he made 20 known appearances. He represented the North in the North v. South series.

== Bibliography ==
- Haygarth, Arthur (1996) [1862]. Scores & Biographies, Volume 1 (1744–1826). Kennington: Frederick Lillywhite. ISBN 978-19-00592-23-9.
- Haygarth, Arthur (1997) [1862]. Scores & Biographies, Volume 2 (1827–1840). Kennington: Frederick Lillywhite. ISBN 978-19-00592-23-9.
