= Samuel Baldwinson =

English cricketer

Samuel Baldwinson (14 January 1823 – 2 March 1856) was an English first-class cricketer who was active from 1844 to 1851. He played mostly for Yorkshire sides but also for Manchester Cricket Club in 1845 and 1846.

Baldwinson scored 87 not out for Manchester against Sheffield at Moss Lane, Manchester in 1846, the highest recorded first-class score by a Manchester player.
