= William Musters =

English priest, rector, and cricketer

- Born: 1 January 1810
- Died: 16 October 1870 (aged 60)
- Occupation: Rector
- Parent(s): John Musters; Mary Ann Chaworth
- Relatives: John George Musters

William Musters Chaworth Musters (1 January 1810 – 16 October 1870) was an English cricketer who was associated with Oxford University Cricket Club and made his debut in 1829. He also played for Nottinghamshire.

Musters was educated at Corpus Christi College, Oxford. He became a Church of England priest and was rector of Colwick Old Church from 1834 to 1860.

== Bibliography ==
- Haygarth, Arthur (1996) [1862]. Scores & Biographies, Volume 1 (1744–1826). Kennington: Frederick Lillywhite. ISBN 978-19-00592-23-9.
- Haygarth, Arthur (1997) [1862]. Scores & Biographies, Volume 2 (1827–1840). Kennington: Frederick Lillywhite. ISBN 978-19-00592-23-9.
