= George Thorpe (cricketer, born 1834) =

English cricketer

George Thorpe (20 February 1834 – 2 March 1899) was an English first-class cricketer, active 1862–64, who played for Sheffield Cricket Club (aka Yorkshire) in 1862 and then for Yorkshire County Cricket Club. He was born and died in Sheffield. Thorpe was a right-handed batsman, who scored 19 runs at 6.33, with a highest score of 9* against Surrey. He held three catches in the field, but was not a bowler.
