= Samuel Parr (cricketer) =

English cricketer

Samuel Parr (2 May 1820 – 12 May 1873) was an English first-class cricketer active 1840–55 who played for Nottinghamshire. He was born in Radcliffe-on-Trent and died in Nottingham. A brother of George Parr (one of the best cricketers in history), He played in 25 first-class matches.
