= Henry Sampson (English cricketer) =

English cricketer

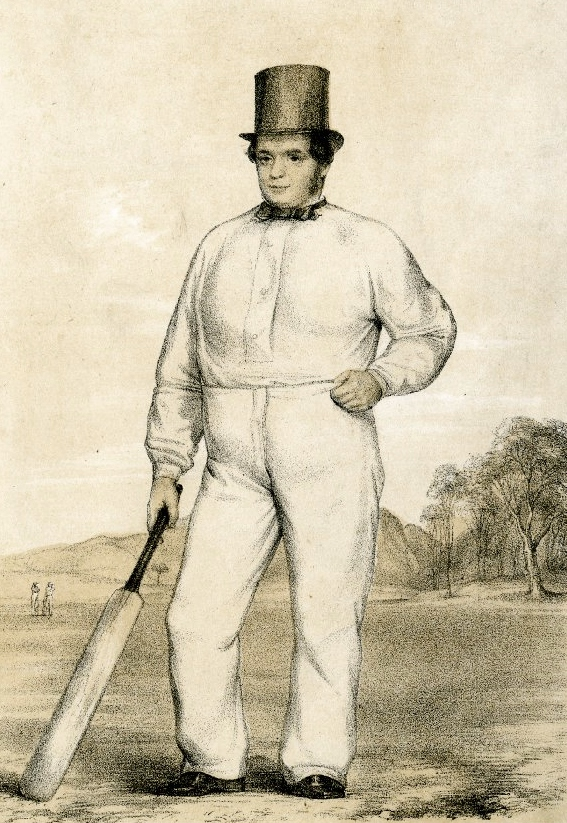

Personal information
- Born: 13 March 1813; Sheffield, England
- Died: 29 March 1885 (aged 72); Sheffield, England
- Height: 5 ft 4 in (1.63 m)

Domestic team information
- Years: Team
- 1839–1860: Sheffield

Henry Sampson (also Samson, 13 March 1813 – 29 March 1885) was an English cricketer. He played for Sheffield Cricket Club between 1839 and 1860.
