= Joseph Oates =

American politician

Joseph E. Oates was a carpenter and politician in Florida, United States.

He was born in Sumter County, Georgia and was enslaved. He was owned by Florida Governor David Shelby Walker of Florida and was literate. He was chosen to attend the National Negro Congress in Washington, D.C. in February 1866 as part of a delegation that met with U.S. president Andrew Johnson. Histories disparaging the Reconstruction era recount a story of him absconding with money from his political supporters. Accounts of him and his African American colleagues in the state legislature are also degrading.

Oates represented Leon County and Wakulla County at Florida's 1868 Constitutional Convention. He was one of the signers of the constitution it produced.

== See also ==
- African American officeholders from the end of the Civil War until before 1900
