= Grenville Astill =

British academic

Academic work
- Discipline: Medieval archaeology
- Institutions: University of Reading

Grenville Astill is a professor in the department of archaeology at the University of Reading. Astill is a specialist in Medieval urbanisation, the medieval countryside and landscape archaeology, monasticism and technology and industry.

He received a Phd from the University of Birmingham. Astill is a director of the Bordesley Abbey Project.

== Awards and honours ==
Astill was elected as a Fellow of the Society of Antiquaries in 1988.

== Selected publications ==
- Medieval Farming and Technology: The Impact of Agricultural Change in Northwest Europe (edited with J. Langdon), 1997
- "Community, Identity and the Later Anglo-Saxon Town", in W. Davies, G. Halsall and A. Reynolds (eds), People and Space in the Middle Ages, 300-1300, Turnhout, 2006, 233-54.
- "Medieval Towns and Urbanization", in R. Gilchrist and A. Reynolds (eds), 1957-2007. SMA Anniversary Monograph, Leeds, 2009, 255-70
- "Exchange, coinage and the economy of early medieval England". In J. Escalona (ed), Scale and Scale Change in Western Europe in the First Millennium. Brepols.
- "Overview: Trade, Exchange and Urbanisation". In S. Crawford, H. Hamerow and D. Hinton (eds), The Oxford Handbook of Anglo-Saxon Archaeology. Oxford University Press.
