= Brian Waud =

English cricketer

Brian Wilkes Waud (4 June 1837 – 30 May 1889) was an English cricketer, who played 19 matches for Oxford University (1857–1860), Sheffield Cricket Club (aka Yorkshire; 1862), Yorkshire County Cricket Club (1863–1864), The Gentlemen (1860), Yorkshire with Stockton-on-Tees (1861), Gentlemen of the North (1862) and the North of England (1863).

Born in Chester Court, Selby, Yorkshire, England, Waud was a right-handed batsman and wicket-keeper, who scored 432 runs at 16.00, with a highest score of 42 against Nottinghamshire. He took fifteen catches and completed seven stumpings.

Waud was educated at University College, Oxford, then studied law at the Inner Temple and was called to the bar in 1862. He died in May 1889 in Toronto, Ontario, Canada.
