= William Astill =

English cricketer

William Astill was a Nottingham cricketer in 1825. Details of his birth and death are unknown. He played for Nottingham in their important match against Bury St Edmunds at Rougham Park on 12 September 1825.

== Bibliography ==
- Haygarth, Arthur (1862). Scores & Biographies, Volume 1 (1744–1826). Lillywhite.
