= Charles Jarvis (cricketer) =

English cricketer

Charles Jarvis (11 November 1792 – October 1855) was an English cricketer who played for Nottingham Cricket Club in the early 19th century. He played only one match in 1826.

== Bibliography ==
- Haygarth, Arthur (1996) [1862]. Scores & Biographies, Volume 1 (1744–1826). Kennington: Frederick Lillywhite. ISBN 978-19-00592-23-9.
