= William Slinn =

English cricketer

William Slinn (13 December 1826 – 19 June 1888) was an English cricketer, who played for Sheffield Cricket Club (aka Yorkshire) 1861–62; and for Yorkshire County Cricket Club 1863–64. In other important matches, he played for the United All England Eleven (1860), an England "Next XIV" (1860), the North of England (1863), and the All England Eleven (1864).

Slinn was born in Sheffield and died, aged 61, in June 1888 in Wortley, Leeds. He was a right-arm fast roundarm bowler. He took 111 wickets in his nineteen matches at an average of 13.20 with a best analysis of eight for 33 against Surrey. He took five wickets in an innings nine times, and ten wickets in a match on four occasions. He was less successful as a right-handed batsman, scoring 46 runs at an average of only 2.00, with a best score of 11. When fielding, he held eleven catches.

Besides Yorkshire, he played county cricket matches for Buckinghamshire, Rutland, Monmouthshire, Northamptonshire, and a single match in 1865 for Shropshire.
