= Emmanuel Vincent =

English cricketer

Emmanuel Vincent (2 October 1798 – 7 July 1860) was an English professional cricketer, who played from 1826 to 1837.

Born in Sheffield, Yorkshire, England, Vincent was a right-handed batsman and wicket-keeper, who was mainly associated with Sheffield, and made twenty known appearances. He represented the North in the North v. South series.

Vincent died in Sheffield in July 1860.
