= James Dearman =

English cricketer

James Dearman (born c.1808 and christened 31 January 1808 at Darnall, Sheffield; died 3 September 1854) was an English professional cricketer who made 22 known appearances in important matches from 1826 to 1846. An all-rounder and occasional wicket-keeper, he was mainly associated with Sheffield Cricket Club.

Dearman represented the North in the North v South series. A small man, 5 ft 4in tall, he and his brother Charles played in Sheffield matches up to 1846, and one of them may have appeared in a Marsden match in 1826. Originally a filesmith living in Sheffield, he moved to Darnell in 1835, where he kept the inn and cricket ground, his wife continuing to run the ground after his death.

In 1838, Dearman challenged Alfred Mynn for the single wicket "championship of England". They played two matches at Town Malling and Sheffield. Both were won by Mynn. Dearman was so small beside Mynn that they were dubbed "David and Goliath".

== Sources ==
- H. S. Altham, A History of Cricket, Volume 1 (to 1914), George Allen & Unwin, 1962
- Arthur Haygarth, Scores & Biographies, Volumes 1–3 (1744–1848), Lillywhite, 1862
