= Forest New Ground =

English cricket venue

Coordinates: 52.966°N 1.161°W

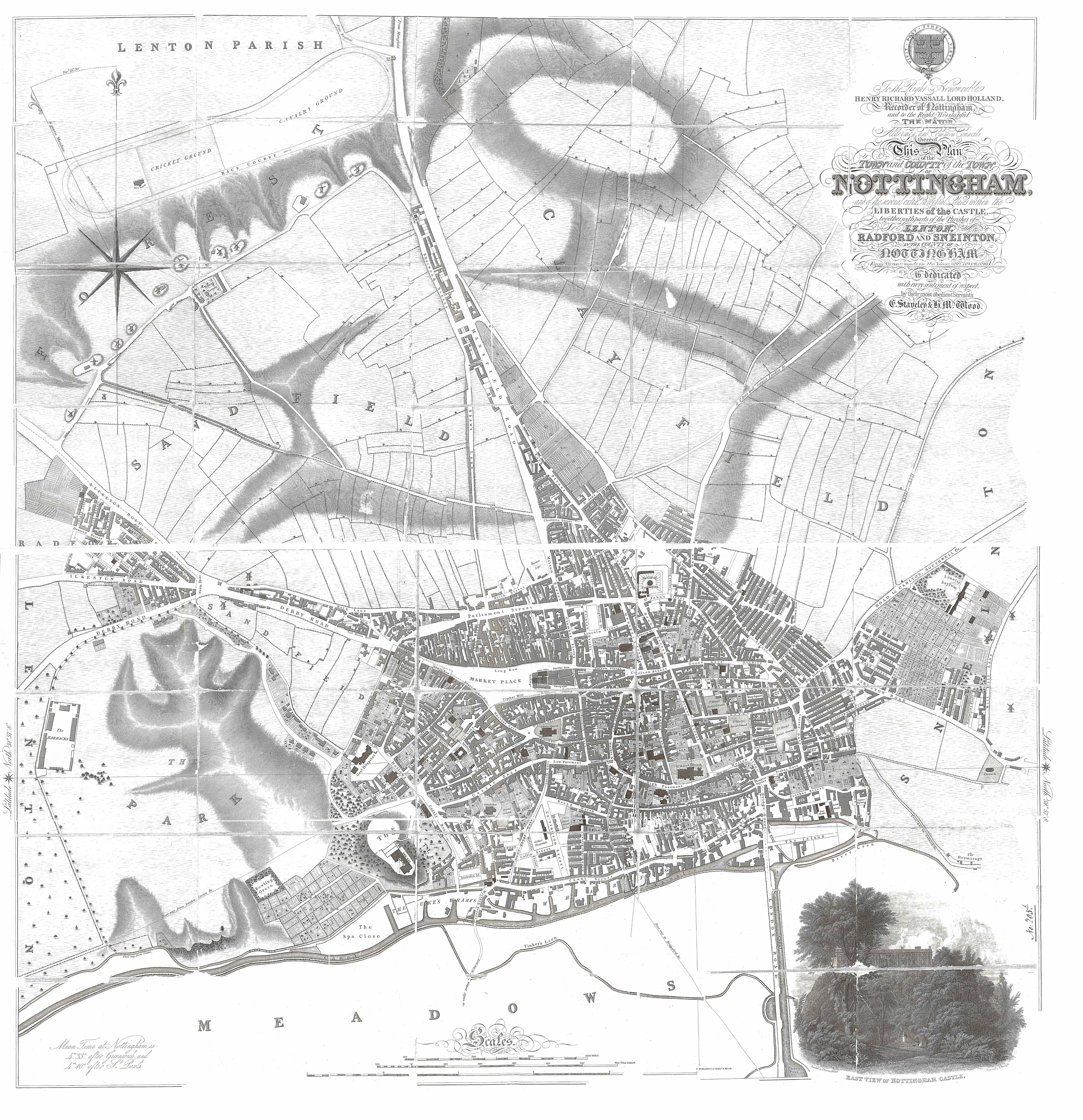
The Forest, with race course, cricket ground and windmills can be seen in the top left of Staveley and Wood's 1831 map of Nottingham

The Forest New Ground at Nottingham was an important cricket venue used by Nottingham Cricket Club in the late 18th and early 19th centuries. The name "Forest" is because the site, which is now the Forest Recreation Ground, was the southernmost part of Sherwood Forest. For over 300 years the Forest has been home to sport. It was home to Nottingham Racecourse, which by 1727 had been granted a Royal Plate race. Forest New Ground was incorporated within the old Forest Racecourse and in some sources the cricket venue is referred to as Forest Racecourse or else as "Forest Ground".

First recorded in 1771 for the Nottingham v Sheffield match, the Forest ground was used for cricket until 1979. However, because "The Forest was open and free to all comers", it was superseded for important matches after 1840, when William Clarke, having converted a field into an enclosed cricket ground,Trent Bridge, organised three matches there against Sussex.

Today, the Forest Recreation Ground is owned by Nottingham City Council and is used for football and the annual Goose Fair.</ref>

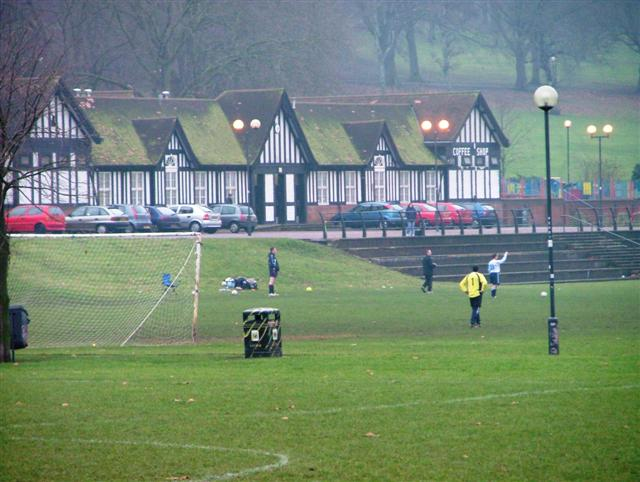
Forest Sports Pavilion - geograph.org.uk
