= Portrack Lane =

Cricket ground in Stockton-on-Tees, England

- Interactive map of Portrack Lane

Ground information
- Location: Stockton-on-Tees, Durham
- Country: England
- Coordinates: 54.5708°N 1.3051°W
- Establishment: c. 1839

Team information
Yorkshire and Durham	(1858)
Yorkshire with Stockton-on-Tees	(1861)
- As of 28 July 2010; Source: Ground profile

Portrack Lane was a cricket ground in Stockton-on-Tees, Durham. The first recorded match on the ground was in 1839, when Stockton played an All England Eleven. The ground also hosted two first-class matches, the first of which was in 1858 when a combined Yorkshire and Durham team played Nottinghamshire. The second and final first-class match to be played on the ground came in 1861, when Yorkshire with Stockton-on-Tees played Cambridgeshire.

The final recorded match on the ground saw Stockton play a United South of England Eleven. Shortly after this, the ground ceased to be used for cricket matches. The ground was located at the far western end of Portrack Lane. By 1899, an iron works had been built on the ground, with the site today is occupied by an industrial estate and a gas holder. Portrack Lane is now primarily known as a major shopping area / complex in Stockton on Tees Asda have had a large superstore on Portrack Lane since 1970. The old store was replaced by a larger new store with a petrol filling station in May 2008. The old building was subsequently demolished.
