= Moss Lane Cricket Ground =

Former cricket ground in Manchester, England

Ground information
- Location: Moss Side, Manchester, Lancashire
- Coordinates: 53.45757°N 2.24077°W
- Establishment: 1832

Team information
Manchester Cricket Club	(1844–1846)
- As of 4 September 2010; Source: profile

Moss Lane Cricket Ground was a cricket ground in Moss Side, Manchester, Lancashire. The first recorded match on the ground was in 1864, when Manchester Cricket Club played Sheffield Cricket Club.

In 1844, the ground held its inaugural first-class match when Manchester played Sheffield Cricket Club who were called Yorkshire on that occasion. From 1844 to 1846, the ground played host to four first-class matches, the last of which saw Manchester play Sheffield.

The final recorded match on the ground came in 1847 when Manchester Slow Bowlers played Manchester Fast Bowlers. The ground was later developed, with St Mary's Church covering the site today.
