= Darnall New Ground =

Cricket ground in Sheffield, England

Coordinates: 53.386°N 1.409°W

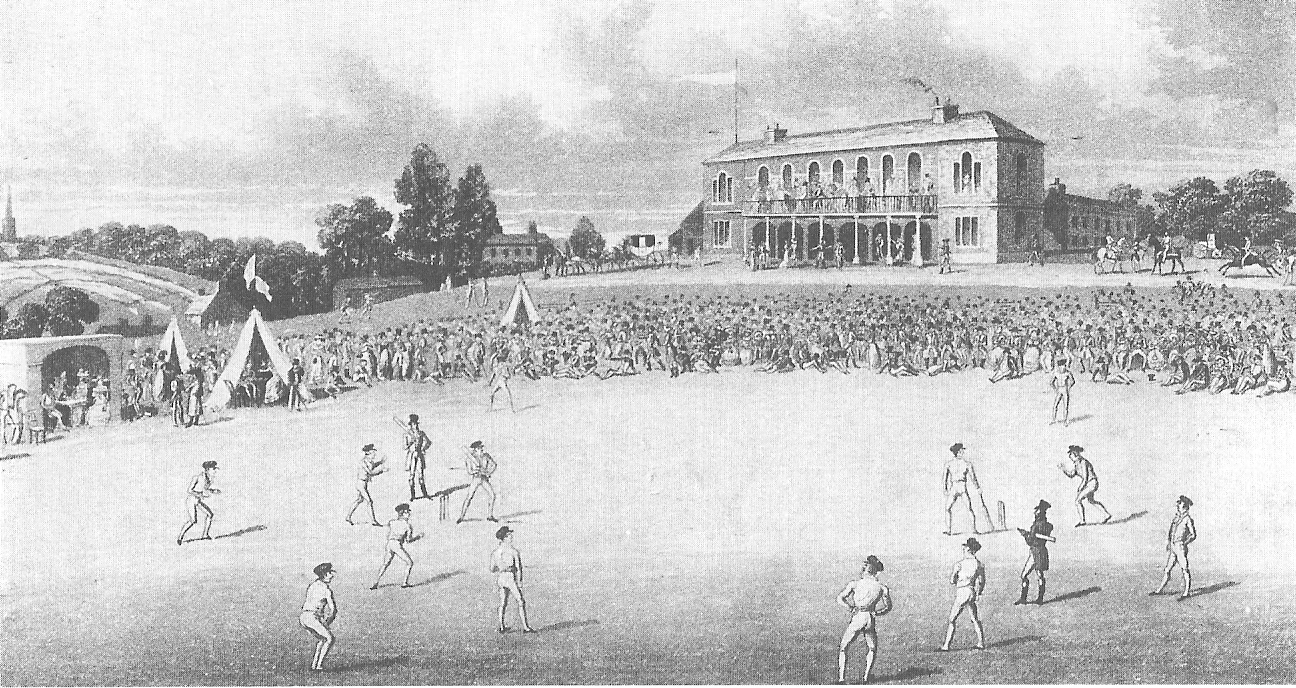
A match at the New Ground in the early 1820s.

Darnall New Ground at Turnpike Road, Darnall, Sheffield was an important cricket venue in the 1820s. It was the home ground of Sheffield Cricket Club. The New Ground superseded Darnall Old Ground, which Sheffield had used in the early 1820s. It was also the home ground of the Commercial Cricket Club, which played there on Wednesdays.
