= Hyde Park (cricket ground) =

Former cricket venue in Sheffield, England

Coordinates: 53.382485°N 1.451389°W

Hyde Park Ground
- Interactive map of Hyde Park Ground

Ground information
- Location: Sheffield, Yorkshire
- Country: England
- Establishment: 1826 (opening date)
- Capacity: 16,000

Team information
Sheffield Cricket Club	(1826-1866)
- As of 23 August 2010; Source: Ground profile

Hyde Park was a cricket ground in Sheffield on a site now used for high-rise community flats. It took the name of fields that occupied the area in the early 19th century. Hyde Park was used for historically important matches between 1830 and 1854. It opened in 1826 and was adopted by Sheffield Cricket Club as a home venue, replacing Darnall New Ground, from 1830 until 1854. It was itself superseded in April 1855 by Bramall Lane. Hyde Park staged the first "Roses Match" between Yorkshire and Lancashire in July 1849.

== Cricket ground ==
The first recorded match on the ground took place from 30 August to 1 September 1830 between Sheffield and Nottingham, Sheffield winning by 41 runs. Sheffield used the ground several times for important matches, their last one there being against Manchester on 26 and 27 July 1852, Sheffield winning by an innings and 22 runs.

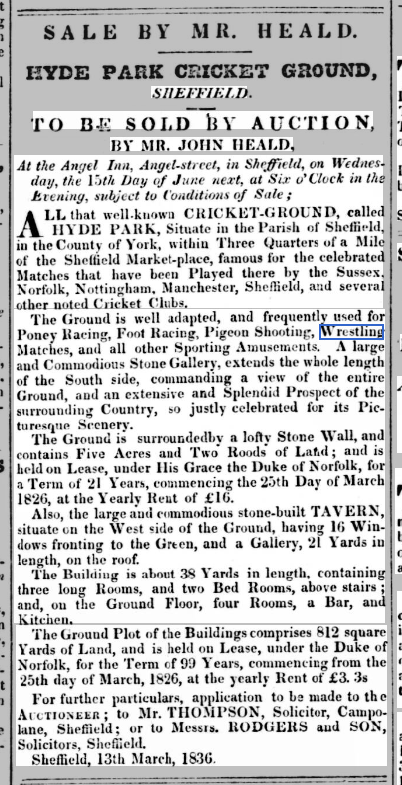
Sale notice for Hyde Park Cricket Ground, Sheffield, 1836.

Most of Sheffield's matches were against other town clubs, notably Manchester and Nottingham, but from 1833 they began to take on teams that represented counties and, for these matches, Sheffield called themselves Yorkshire. As such, the first inter-county match involving a Yorkshire team was against Norfolk at Hyde Park from 2 to 5 September 1833, Yorkshire winning by 120 runs. Hyde Park staged the first "Roses Match" between Yorkshire and Lancashire on 23–25 July 1849, Yorkshire winning by 5 wickets. The last match at Hyde Park by a Yorkshire team was on 6 and 7 June 1853 against the United All England Eleven (UEE). It was an "odds match" as Yorkshire used 14 players; the UEE won by an innings and 36 runs. The last known match of any kind on the ground was on 4 and 5 June 1866 when a team of 18 Nottingham and Sheffield Colts combined to play against the All England Eleven (AEE).

== Afterwards ==
Soon afterwards, Hyde Park was acquired by the Hallamshire Volunteer Rifle Corps as their drill ground. W. G. Grace played in the Colts v. AEE match as a guest player and captained the Colts XVIII. He recalled Hyde Park in his Recollections (published in 1899), saying: "The ground stood on the top of a high hill, and I began to despair of the cab ever getting to the top".

In its heyday, Hyde Park covered five and a half acres and so could stage several matches concurrently. Situated on high ground, as Grace said, it was known for "its splendid views and rapid draining and drying". Its ability to stage "massed cricket" emulated Parker's Piece and the Bombay Maidan as up to 200 cricketers could be playing there at any one time.

The site was later converted to the Hyde Park Greyhound Stadium in 1933 until 1980.

== Bibliography ==
- Grace, W. G. (1980) [1899]. "W. G." – Cricketing Reminiscences and Personal Recollections. Hambledon Press. ISBN 0-9506882-0-7.
- Haygarth, Arthur (1862). Scores & Biographies, Volume 2 (1827–1840). Lillywhite.
- Haygarth, Arthur (1862). Scores & Biographies, Volume 4 (1849–1854). Lillywhite.
- Hodgson, Derek (1989). The Official History of Yorkshire County Cricket Club. The Crowood Press. ISBN 1-85223-274-9.
