= Nottingham Cricket Club =

Former English cricket club

Several Nottingham Cricket Club matches have been recorded from 1771 to 1848, and its team generally played historically important matches, depending on the quality of their opponents. The earliest reference to cricket in the county of Nottinghamshire is a match between Nottingham and Sheffield Cricket Club at the Forest Racecourse, Nottingham in August 1771. In many sources, the Nottingham team is called the "Nottingham Old Club" or as the "town club" to distinguish it from Nottinghamshire County Cricket Club, which was founded in 1841. A team called Nottinghamshire had played since 1835 but is believed to have been organised by the town club and only using the county name in certain matches.

Nottingham's opponents in their important matches were most often Sheffield. They played several games against Leicestershire & Rutland a.k.a. Leicester. They had two matches against Cambridge Town Club, one against Marylebone Cricket Club (MCC) and one against a combined Leicester/Sheffield team.

Nottinghamshire as a county team played its first inter-county match versus Sussex at Brown's Ground in Brighton on 27, 28 & 29 August 1835. All the previous matches had involved Nottingham as a town rather than Nottinghamshire as a county. Nottinghamshire has been recognised as an important/first-class county team from 1835. The club grew in strength during the first thirty years of the 19th century and, by the time the county club was founded in 1841, Nottinghamshire was one of the "great counties" in cricket. In either March or April 1841, the formal creation of Nottinghamshire County Cricket Club was enacted. The exact date has been lost. However, as noted above, an informal county club may have been active in 1835.

There is still a Nottingham Cricket Club, known as Nottinghamians and part of the rugby union club of that name. A significant source for the original club is William North's 1832 book of Nottingham Old Club Match Scores.

== Important matches played by Nottingham Cricket Club ==
There are surviving references to fourteen matches involving Nottingham in the 18th century, between 1771 and 1800. After that, the next match in the records is dated 1813. Nine of the fourteen matches to 1800 must be considered important as they were eleven-a-side against MCC or one of the early Sheffield or Leicester teams. There are two matches against a team from Melton Mowbray in Leicestershire, about whom little is known, and these have doubtful status. The other three matches were "odds" games in which either Nottingham or their opponents fielded 22 players against eleven. In the 19th century, many more Nottingham matches are known to have been played. Again, some were "odds" matches and others are deemed to lack importance because of the quality of the opposition.

Although it is an important match, the 1771 game against Sheffield is the earliest surviving reference to cricket in the county of Nottinghamshire. It is believed that the origin of Nottinghamshire County Cricket Club lies in this same Nottingham town club that apparently came into existence by 1770. In 1835, its team was first styled as Nottinghamshire county, rather than Nottingham town, when it played against a county team. County matches to 1840 are included in the table because the Nottinghamshire teams were organised by the Nottingham club. The present Nottinghamshire county club was formally established in 1841.

date	match title	venue	result	sources
26–27 August 1771 (M–Tu)	Nottingham v Sheffield	Forest Racecourse, Nottingham	result unknown
notes	The contemporary reports indicate that the game was not determined on account of "a dispute having arisen by one of the Sheffield players being jostled". It seems the intention was for each team to play three innings each. The end details known are that Sheffield were 60 ahead with Nottingham yet to bat. Sheffield scored 81, 62 and 105 for a total of 248, but it is not known if 105 was an all out total or not. Nottingham had scored 76 and 112 for a total of 188 with another innings in hand. The reports mention a Sheffield batsman called Osguthorpe (sic) who "kept in batting for several hours together", but his name is not among the two lists of players given in Scores & Biographies, one under 26 August 1771 and another under 1 June 1772 (see match below). The lists are evidently the same team but with slight differences for each match. As Osguthorpe is not included, they must be the Nottingham players only. The players are: Coleman (2 appearances), Turner (2), Loughman (2), Roe (2), Spurr (2), Stocks (2), Collishaw (2), Troop (2), Mew (2), Bamford (1), Gladwin (1), Huythwaite (1), Rawson (1). The Sheffield club organised county matches in Yorkshire from the mid-1700s, its teams in important matches being representative of Yorkshire as a county until in 1863 it was the main participant in the official formation of Yorkshire County Cricket Club.
1 June 1772 (M)	Sheffield v Nottingham	Sheffield (exact venue unknown)	Sheffield won
notes	Nottingham forfeited the match after being dismissed for 14 and then seeing Sheffield score 70 with wickets still in hand. A pre-match announcement appeared in the (Nottingham) Daily Messenger on Tuesday, 25 May: "We are informed that the great Cricket Match which has been so long depending between the Society of Nottingham & that of Sheffield is to be finally determined at Sheffield on Mon., 1 June . . . . The Sherwood youths have been practising for some weeks past, and we are told, the odds at Nottingham are 2 to 1 in their favour". The paper followed up with a report on Friday, 12 June that bewailed the defeat of the Nottingham team.
17–18 September 1781 (M–Tu)	Leicester v Nottingham	Loughborough (exact venue unknown)	incomplete due to dispute
notes
21 September 1789	Leicester v Nottingham	Loughborough (exact venue unknown)
notes
5 October 1789	Leicester v Nottingham	Loughborough (exact venue unknown)
notes
29 August 1791	Nottingham v Marylebone Cricket Club (MCC)	King's Meadow, Nottingham
notes
9 July 1792	Leicestershire & Rutland v Nottingham	The Park, Burley-on-the-Hill
notes
25 August 1800	Leicester v Nottingham	St Margaret's Pasture, Leicester
notes
29 September 1800	Nottingham v Sheffield	Mansfield (exact venue unknown)
notes
29 July 1822	Nottingham v Holt (Norfolk)	Forest New Ground, Nottingham
notes	No scorecard has been found.
12 September 1825	Bury St Edmunds v Nottingham	Rougham Park, Bury St Edmunds	Bury St Edmunds won by 33 runs
notes
24 July 1826	Sheffield & Leicester v Nottingham	Darnall New Ground, Sheffield
notes
30 July 1827	Sheffield v Nottingham	Darnall New Ground, Sheffield
notes
20 August 1827	Nottingham v Sheffield	Forest New Ground, Nottingham
notes
1 September 1828	Nottingham v Sheffield	Forest New Ground, Nottingham
notes
22 September 1828	Sheffield v Nottingham	Darnall New Ground, Sheffield
notes
8 June 1829	Nottingham v Nottinghamshire	Forest New Ground, Nottingham
notes
6 July 1829	Leicester v Nottingham	Barker's Ground, Leicester
notes
27 July 1829	Nottingham v Leicester	Forest New Ground, Nottingham
notes
24 August 1829	Sheffield v Nottingham	Darnall New Ground, Sheffield
notes
7 September 1829	Nottingham v Sheffield	Forest New Ground, Nottingham
notes
30 August 1830	Sheffield v Nottingham	Hyde Park Ground, Sheffield
notes
29 August 1831	Sheffield v Nottingham	Hyde Park Ground, Sheffield
notes
15 October 1832	Sheffield v Nottingham	Hyde Park Ground, Sheffield
notes
22 July 1834	Cambridge Town Club v Nottingham	Parker's Piece, Cambridge
notes
26 August 1834	Nottingham v Cambridge Town Club	Forest New Ground, Nottingham
notes
8 September 1834	Sheffield v Nottingham	Hyde Park Ground, Sheffield
notes
27 August 1835	Sussex v Nottinghamshire	Royal New Ground, Brighton
notes
7 September 1835	Nottinghamshire v Sussex	Forest New Ground, Nottingham
notes
24 July 1837	Sussex v Nottinghamshire	Royal New Ground, Brighton
notes
27 July 1837	Kent v Nottinghamshire	Old County Ground, Town Malling
notes
21 August 1837	Nottinghamshire v Sussex	Forest New Ground, Nottingham
notes
15 June 1840	Sussex v Nottinghamshire	Royal New Ground, Brighton
notes
18 June 1840	Kent v Nottinghamshire	Old County Ground, Town Malling
notes
27 July 1840	Nottinghamshire v Sussex	Trent Bridge, Nottingham
notes
21 September 1846	Sheffield v Nottingham	Hyde Park Ground, Sheffield
notes	No scorecard has been found.
24 September 1846	Manchester v Nottingham	Moss Lane, Manchester
notes	No scorecard has been found.
3 July 1848	Sheffield v Nottingham	Hyde Park Ground, Sheffield
notes
17 August 1848	Nottingham v Sheffield	Trent Bridge, Nottingham
notes

== Other matches ==
Records, or at least mentions, of several other matches played by the Nottingham club are in existence. These are not classed as important. Some were against minor club opponents and others were "odds" matches in which one team had more than eleven players. These matches are listed by Cricket Archive:

date	match title	venue
1 September 1783	Melton Mowbray v Nottingham	Melton Mowbray
11 September 1783	Nottingham v Melton Mowbray	The Forest New Ground, Nottingham
30 August 1791	Nottingham XXII v MCC	King's Meadow, Nottingham
5 July 1792	MCC v Nottingham XXII	The Park, Burley-on-the-Hill
3 November 1800	Nottingham v Sheffield XXII	Warsop
15 November 1813	Leicester XXII v Nottingham	Loughborough
20 September 1814	Rutland v Nottingham	The Park, Burley-on-the-Hill
23 June 1817	Nottingham XXII v England	The Forest New Ground, Nottingham
7 September 1818	Nottingham XXII v England	The Forest New Ground, Nottingham
10 September 1821	Leicester XVI v Nottingham	St Margaret's Pasture, Leicester
26 August 1822	Sheffield XV v Nottingham	Darnall Old Ground, Sheffield
9 September 1822	Nottingham v Sheffield XV	The Forest New Ground, Nottingham
11 July 1823	Nottingham v Fallow Field Club	The Forest New Ground, Nottingham
25 August 1823	Nottingham v Leicester XIV	The Forest New Ground, Nottingham
2 September 1833	Nottingham v Nottinghamshire Next XXII	The Forest New Ground, Nottingham
4 September 1836	New Forest Club v Nottingham	The Forest New Ground, Nottingham
26 September 1836	New Forest & Bingham v Nottingham	The Forest New Ground, Nottingham
1 August 1842	Sheffield Wednesday v Nottingham	Sheffield
8 August 1842	Nottingham v Sheffield Wednesday	Trent Bridge, Nottingham
30 June 1843	Nottingham v Hampshire (fill-up)	Trent Bridge, Nottingham
29 July 1844	Sheffield Wednesday v Nottingham	Hyde Park Ground, Sheffield

== See also ==
- List of Nottingham Cricket Club players

== Bibliography ==
- ACS (1981). A Guide to Important Cricket Matches Played in the British Isles 1709 – 1863. Nottingham: ACS.
- Birley, Derek (1999). A Social History of English Cricket. Aurum. ISBN 1-85410-710-0.
- Bowen, Rowland (1970). Cricket: A History of its Growth and Development. Eyre & Spottiswoode.
- Buckley, G. B. (1935). Fresh Light on 18th Century Cricket. Cotterell.
- Buckley, G. B. (1937). Fresh Light on pre-Victorian Cricket. Cotterell.
- Haygarth, Arthur (1862). Scores & Biographies, Volume 1 (1744–1826). Lillywhite.
