= Sheffield Cricket Club =

Historical English cricket team

Team information
- Established: Soon after 1751
- Last match: 1862
- Home venue: Darnall cricket ground Bramall Lane

History
- Notable players: Tom Marsden

The Sheffield Cricket Club was founded in the 18th century and soon began to play a key role in the development of cricket in northern England. It was the direct forerunner of Yorkshire County Cricket Club and some of the teams fielded by Sheffield were styled Yorkshire. Sheffield generally held first-class status, depending on the quality of their opponents, from 1827 to 1855.

== Earliest cricket in Yorkshire ==
The earliest known reference to cricket in Yorkshire is in 1751. This relates to a game on or soon after Monday, 5 August at Stanwick, near Richmond, between the Duke of Cleveland's XI and Earl of Northumberland's XI (the same teams had earlier played in Durham and this is Durham's earliest cricket reference).

It is believed that Sheffield Cricket Club was founded soon after that date and it began to play matches against teams from other northern towns, including some inter-county fixtures.

== Sheffield cricket ==
Sheffield quickly became the main centre for cricket in Yorkshire. In September 1757, a match took place between Wirksworth and Sheffield at Brampton Moor, near Chesterfield. This is the earliest reference to cricket in Derbyshire.

William White's History & General Directory of the Borough of Sheffield (1833) has the following information: "In 1757 we find the Town Trustees attempting the abolition of brutal sports by paying 14/6d to the cricket players on Shrove Tuesday to entertain the populace and prevent the infamous practice of throwing at cocks ". Mr White does not give the primary source from which he himself derived the information but it would likely be in parish or town records of some kind which may or may not still exist.

== Sheffield v. Leeds ==
On Tuesday, 7 July 1761, the Leeds Intelligencer (now the Yorkshire Post) announced a game to be played at Chapeltown the following Thursday (9 July) and this is the first game known to have been played in the Leeds area.

On Thursday, 5 September 1765, the London Chronicle reported a "great match" on Monday, 26 August: Leeds v Sheffield at Chapeltown Moor, near Leeds. Sheffield won "with great difficulty". As this game was highly rated and was reported by a London newspaper, it shows that cricket was well established in Yorkshire only 14 years after it was first reported there.

== Sheffield v. Nottingham ==
In August 1771, the first of many matches between Sheffield and Nottingham was held. This one took place on the Forest Racecourse at Nottingham and is the earliest known reference to cricket in Nottinghamshire and to any team from the county. The result of the game is unknown because "of a dispute having arisen by one of the Sheffield players being jostled" and the reports mention a Sheffield player called Osguthorpe who "kept in batting for several hours together".

This match may tentatively be regarded as the beginning of county-level cricket in the north of England. The Sheffield club was representative of its county in a similar fashion to Nottingham and (much later) Manchester. Although standards of play in the south were probably much higher than in the north at this time, the same scenario can be observed re the Hornchurch, Maidenhead, Chertsey, Dartford and Hambledon clubs in their respective counties.

In 1772, the Daily Messenger carried reports of a match in Sheffield on Monday, 1 June, in which Sheffield defeated Nottingham.

== 19th century ==
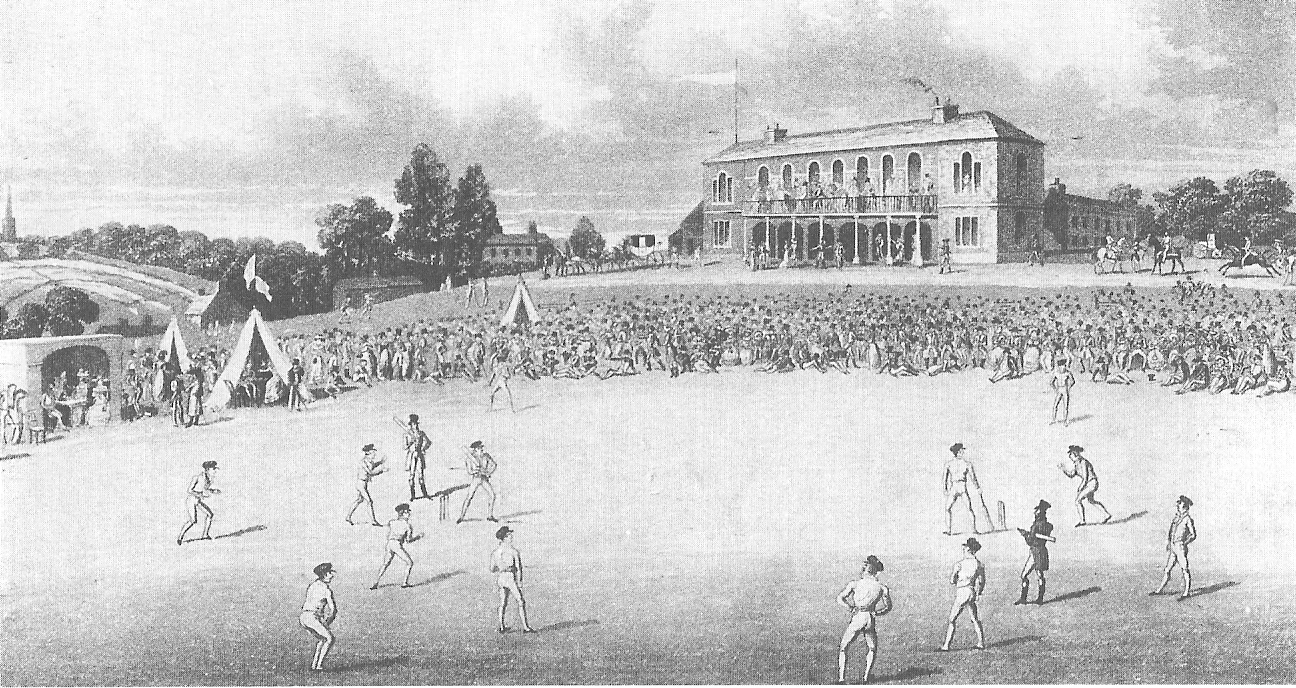
A cricket match at Darnall in the 1820s, a venue at which Sheffield often played.

The Sheffield club continued to play mainly against other northern clubs. In July 1828 Sheffield visited Leicester. The latter won by seven wickets over three-days play.

In September 1833 occurred the first use of "Yorkshire" as the team name instead of "Sheffield". This was in the Yorkshire v Norfolk match at Hyde Park, Sheffield which Yorkshire won by 120 runs. The great Fuller Pilch was still playing for Norfolk. Yorkshire was by now finding star players of its own, especially the fast bowling all-rounder Tom Marsden.

Although the Sheffield and Manchester clubs had met previously, there was a significant development on 23, 24 & 25 July 1849 when the match was called Yorkshire versus Lancashire at Hyde Park. This was the first match to involve a Lancashire county team and also, therefore, the first "Roses Match". Yorkshire won by 5 wickets.

In the winter of 1854, the club agreed to build a new ground on land near to Bramall Lane which they were to lease from the Duke of Norfolk for ninety-nine years. The first game played at Bramall Lane on 30 April 1855 between "The Eleven" and "The Twenty-two" resulted in the senior team losing by an innings and 28 runs.

On 7 March 1861, a Match Fund Committee to run Yorkshire county matches was established in Sheffield, which had by then been the home of Yorkshire cricket for nearly 100 years. It was from this fund that Yorkshire County Cricket Club was founded two years later. This was an exact parallel with the foundation of Sussex County Cricket Club from a similar fund (1836–1839).

On 8 January 1863, the formation of Yorkshire County Cricket Club was agreed at a meeting of the Sheffield Match Fund Committee in the Adelphi Hotel, Sheffield. The new club was originally based at Bramall Lane and played its first inter-county match against Surrey at The Oval on 4, 5 & 6 June 1863. It was a rain-affected draw, evenly balanced. The foundation of Yorkshire effectively superseded Sheffield, which ceased to be an important team in its own right.

For the history of Yorkshire cricket since the foundation of the county club, see: Yorkshire County Cricket Club

== Sheffield CC records (matches only) ==
- Highest team total: 282 v Manchester, Botanical Gardens, Manchester, 1854
- Lowest team total: 39 v Nottingham, The Forest New Ground, Nottingham, 1829
- Highest individual innings: 125 by Tom Marsden v Nottingham, Nottingham, 1828
- Best bowling: 7/38 by Henry Wright v Manchester, Hyde Park Ground, Sheffield, 1852

== Bibliography ==
- ACS (1982). A Guide to FC Cricket Matches Played in the British Isles. Nottingham: ACS.
- ACS (1981). A Guide to Important Cricket Matches Played in the British Isles 1709 – 1863. Nottingham: ACS.
- Birley, Derek (1999). A Social History of English Cricket. Aurum. ISBN 1-85410-710-0.
- Bowen, Rowland (1970). Cricket: A History of its Growth and Development. Eyre & Spottiswoode.
- Buckley, G. B. (1935). Fresh Light on 18th Century Cricket. Cotterell.
- Buckley, G. B. (1937). Fresh Light on pre-Victorian Cricket. Cotterell.
- Haygarth, Arthur (1862). Scores & Biographies, Volume 1 (1744–1826). Lillywhite. ISBN 1-900592-23-1.
- Waghorn, H. T. (1906). The Dawn of Cricket. Electric Press.
