= United North of England Eleven =

The United North of England Eleven (UNEE) was an itinerant cricket team founded in 1869 by George Freeman and Roger Iddison with the backing of Lord Londesborough who became the team's president. As its name suggests, its purpose was to bring together the best players of England's northern counties and play against all-comers. The team was thus one of several spinoffs from William Clarke's original All-England Eleven (AEE).

Unfortunately for the team, it was founded at a time when the demand for exhibition matches was in decline. This was due to an excess of supply as there had been several predecessors and there was a greater interest in county cricket, which had developed in the 1860s. Another factor was competition, particularly from the United South of England Eleven (USEE) which featured cricket's main attraction W G Grace. The UNEE had a short existence and it folded in 1881.

== UNEE matches against the AEE and the USEE ==
As soon as it was founded, the UNEE established a regional rivalry with the USEE and the two teams met three times in 1870, the UNEE's first season. The UNEE got off to a flying start when they easily beat the USEE, including the Graces, at Lord's in July 1870 by an innings and 70 runs. The team was:

- Roger Iddison (captain), George Freeman, Ephraim Lockwood, Thomas Bignall, George Atkinson, Joseph Rowbotham, George Howitt, Luke Greenwood, Thomas Plumb, Cornelius Coward, George Wootton.

In the next match at Bramall Lane, Sheffield, the UNEE won by an innings and 5 runs. The Graces did not play in this game. The UNEE team differed slightly with John Smith and Elisha Rawlinson replacing Coward and Wootton. The teams met again at The Oval in August and this match was drawn, the USEE needing 33 more to win with eight wickets standing and W G Grace still in with 51 not out. Wootton and Alfred Shaw replaced Atkinson and Rawlinson in the UNEE side.

In 1871, the UNEE did not play the USEE but did have one match against the AEE at Bolton in July. Although the UNEE had been reinforced by the addition of A N Hornby and Fred Morley, they were well beaten by an innings and 21 runs.

The UNEE's rivalry with the USEE was renewed in 1872 when four matches were arranged although the last one at Leeds in September was cancelled. The first match at Bishop's Stortford in June was drawn. Robert Carpenter, William Oscroft, John Hicks and James Shaw made first appearances for the UNEE. In August, the UNEE won by 8 wickets at Hunslet, Arnold Rylott making his first appearance. In September, the tide turned and the USEE recorded its first win over the UNEE by 8 wickets despite the addition of Thomas Hayward and Richard Daft to the UNEE team.

The elevens did not meet in 1873 and there were two matches in 1874 at Todmorden and Wellingborough. William Mycroft made his UNEE debut at Todmorden in July, when the USEE won convincingly by an innings and 30 runs, largely due to a century by Henry Charlwood and ten wickets taken by W G Grace. The USEE won by 9 wickets at Wellingborough in September after the UNEE followed on. Tom Emmett and Robert Smith joined the UNEE for this match.

There were no matches in 1875 and then the UNEE reasserted itself in 1876 with a win and a draw from two matches against the USEE. The first at Fartown Ground, Huddersfield was won by 7 wickets after Andrew Greenwood scored 111. George Ulyett was playing for the UNEE by now and the team at Huddersfield included three newcomers in David Eastwood, Joseph Blackburn and Robert Clayton. In the second match at the Town Cricket Club Ground in Hull, the UNEE was saved by an innings of 108 not out by Ephraim Lockwood but the highlight of the match was W G Grace's innings of 126 in a USEE total of only 159. William Oscroft and Arthur Shrewsbury made their UNEE debuts and, with Alfred Shaw and Fred Morley returning, there was a strong Nottinghamshire contingent. Robert Butler and John Tye also made first appearances.

That was the last time the UNEE played the USEE although there was a curious footnote to the series when the USEE played against the official North of England cricket team in 1880. The North's team in this match at Rotherham bore little resemblance to the UNEE with only Shrewsbury and Mycroft involved. Nevertheless, the official North hammered another nail into the coffin of the unofficial USEE with a 53 run victory.

== Other matches ==
The team played 15 other matches in its first season, 1870, mostly in the north. The majority were minor matches played against odds while the last of the season, against Richard Daft's XI at Holbeck was a first-class match. The UNEE team was:

- Roger Iddison (captain), George Freeman, Ephraim Lockwood, George Pinder (wicket-keeper), John Smith, Thomas Bignall, George Atkinson, Joseph Rowbotham, Elisha Rawlinson, Luke Greenwood, George Howitt.

In 1871, the UNEE played seven matches, followed by seven in 1872; seven in 1873; two in 1874 and then just one match in 1875, although this one was a first-class fixture against Derbyshire at Saltergate in Chesterfield. The UNEE defeated Derbyshire by 90 runs with an all-Yorkshire team:

- Joseph Rowbotham (captain), John Thewlis senior, Charles Ullathorne, George Pinder (wicket-keeper), Ephraim Lockwood, Luke Greenwood, George Ulyett, Tom Emmett, Andrew Greenwood, Tom Armitage, Allen Hill.

With interest fading, the team struggled on and played one odds match at Saltaire in 1876. There were no matches at all in 1877 and then something of a revival in 1878 when they played eight, followed by nine in 1879. The last of the UNEE's first-class matches was played in June 1879 against a London United Eleven at the Aston Lower Grounds in Birmingham. The UNEE team in this match was very strong:

- George Pinder (captain; wicket-keeper), George Ulyett, Ephraim Lockwood, William Oscroft, John Selby, Arthur Shrewsbury, Billy Bates, Tom Emmett, Andrew Greenwood, Tom Armitage, Allen Hill.

They easily defeated their weaker opponents by 160 runs, but public interest was on the wane as county and, after the 1878 Australian team had toured England, international cricket were greater attractions. The UNEE continued to play odds matches for another two seasons only. There were just two in 1880 and one in 1881, which was the UNEE's final recorded match at Skipton in June.
