= Allen Hill (cricketer) =

English cricketer

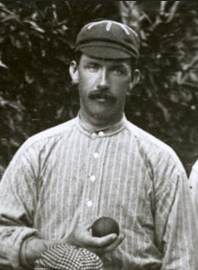
- Hill in 1876

Personal information
- Born: 14 November 1845; Kirkheaton, Yorkshire, England
- Died: 28 August 1910 (aged 64); Leyland, Lancashire, England
- Batting: Right-handed
- Bowling: Right arm fast (roundarm)

International information
- National side: England
- Test debut (cap 5): 15 March 1877 v Australia
- Last Test: 4 April 1877 v Australia

Domestic team information
- Years: Team
- 1871–1882: Yorkshire

Umpiring information
- Tests umpired: 1 (1890)

Career statistics
Competition	Test	First-class
Matches	2	193
Runs scored	101	2,478
Batting average	50.50	8.94
100s/50s	0/0	0/0
Top score	49	49
Balls bowled	340	30,032
Wickets	7	749
Bowling average	18.57	14.26
5 wickets in innings	0	57
10 wickets in match	0	10
Best bowling	4/27	8/48
Catches/stumpings	1/–	142/–
- Source: CricketArchive, 26 December 2009

Allen Hill (14 November 1845, Kirkheaton, Huddersfield, Yorkshire – 28 August 1910, Leyland, Lancashire) played in the first-ever cricket Test, taking the first wicket. Hill also went on to umpire in the Test match played at Lord's in 1890.

== Early years ==
Allen Hill was the son of Francis (Frank) Hill, a Hand Loom Fancy Weaver, and Elizabeth Thornton (married 5 September 1825, Kirkheaton). In 1851 Frank and Betty were living at Shaw Cross, Kirkheaton with 6 children. In 1861 they had moved to Cheesbourgh (sic) Fold with only Allen age 17, described as a Fancy Weaver, then living with them.

== Marriages ==
Allen married Ellen Jessop in 1868 and in 1871 they were living at Common End, Lepton, Yorkshire. Allen's occupation at this time was described as Fancy Weaver. There was a son Frank born c. 1869 who died in 1876 age 7.

By 1891 Allen had moved to 3 Stanley Street (Goulding Terrace), Leyland, Lancs. In that year's census he was a widower, his wife Ellen having died in 1889, and his occupation was then shown as 'Professional Cricketer'. There were 4 daughters – Alice (19), Kathleen Mary (12), Gertrude (10) and Mabel (7).

In the 1901 census Allen was living at Fox Lane in Leyland with his 2nd wife Margaret (Whittle), daughter of James Whittle, a coachman, & Ann Mills, whom he had married in 1900. She was some 18 years his junior. He would then be 57, shown in the census as 51, but still described as a Professional Cricketer. Daughters Gertrude (21) and Mabel (17) were still at home along with Allen's grandson Frank Hill born 1901.

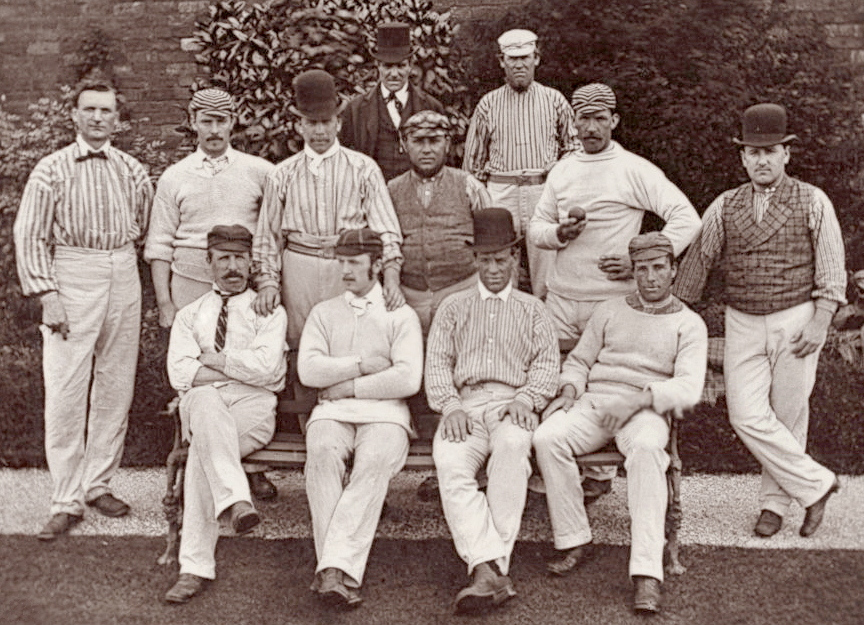
The Yorkshire team in 1875 was captained by Joseph Rowbotham. Back row: G. Martin (umpire), John Thewlis. Middle row: George Pinder, George Ulyett, Tom Armitage, Joseph Rowbotham, Allen Hill, Andrew Greenwood. Front row: Tom Emmett, John Hicks, Ephraim Lockwood, Charlie Ullathorne.

== Cricket career ==
He began his career with Lascelles Hall and Kirkheaton clubs and, in 1863, became professional at Dewsbury and Savile, but it was with Burnley when he first played for the county in 1871. He played 139 matches for Yorkshire between 1871 and 1882. His highest score for Yorkshire was 49 versus Middlesex at Bramall Lane, Sheffield in 1876. His best bowling was 7 for 14 against Surrey at Argyle Street, in Hull in 1879. Hill played for the Gentlemen v Players, from 1874 to 1882. He toured with Lillywhite to Australia in 1876–77.

== Test career ==
Allen Hill came out on the Melbourne Cricket Ground on 15 March 1877 as England became the 1st International Team to field and bowl. Hill bowled the 2nd over of the Innings conceding the 1st run. In the 4th over he bowled Australia No: 2 Batsman, Nat Thomson to take the honour of being the 1st Test Bowler to take a wicket and the 1st Test Bowler to bowl a Batsman. Hill and Nat Thomson became the 1st Bowler/Batsman Partnership in Test Cricket. When Australia were 40 for 1 Australia No: 3, Tom Horan hit (or mis-hit) a delivery from Alfred Shaw and Allen Hill became the 1st international fielder to take a catch. He was also the first player to open the batting and the bowling in a same Test.

Hill played in the 2nd Test of the 1876–77 Series. On the 2nd day Allen joined Tom Emmett when England 162 for 6. He partnered Tom Emmett, Tom Armitage and England Captain, James Lillywhite, junior. At 259 for 8 Allen Hill was run out for 49.

Hill was a bowler with an approximate roundarm action, which said was "one of the best of its kind that can be recalled".

Hill, who described his profession as being that of a woollen weaver in 1881, had a wife, Ellen, who was three years his junior, and at least three daughters Alice, Kathleen and Gertrude. His playing career ended in 1883, when he broke his collar-bone, but he went on to become an umpire.
