= List of Australia cricketers who have taken five-wicket hauls on Test debut =

In cricket, a five-wicket haul (also known as a "five–for" or "fifer") refers to a bowler taking five or more wickets in a single innings. This is regarded as a notable achievement. As November 2026, 181 cricketers have taken a five-wicket haul on debut in a Test match, with 35 of them being taken by Australian cricketers.

== Key ==
- Date – Date the match was held. Starting date of the match for Test matches.
- Overs – Number of overs bowled in that innings.
- Runs – Runs conceded.
- Wkts – Number of wickets taken.
- Batsmen – The batsmen whose wickets were taken in the five-wicket haul.
- Econ – Bowling economy rate (average runs per over).
- Inn – The innings of the match in which the five-wicket haul was taken.
- Result – The result for the Australia team in that match.
- ♠ – The bowler was selected "Man of the match".
- * – 10 wickets or more taken in the match.

Five-wicket hauls on Test debut by Australian bowlers
No.	Bowler	Date	Ground	Against	Inn	Overs	Runs	Wkts	Econ	Batsmen	Result
1	Billy Midwinter	15 March 1877	Melbourne Cricket Ground, Melbourne	England	1	54.0	78	5	1.44	HRJ Charlwood; A Greenwood; T Armitage; A Shaw; T Emmett	Won
2	Tom Kendall	15 March 1877	Melbourne Cricket Ground, Melbourne	England	2	33.1	55	7	1.66	A Hill; A Greenwood; HRJ Charlwood; G Ulyett; A Shaw; T Armitage; T Emmett	Won
3	William Cooper	31 December 1881	Melbourne Cricket Ground, Melbourne	England	2	61.0	120	6	1.96	G Ulyett; J Selby; W Bates; A Shrewsbury; WE Midwinter; T Emmett	Drawn
4	Charlie Turner	29 January 1887	Sydney Cricket Ground, Sydney	England	1	61.0	76	5	1.25	W Barnes; RG Barlow; W Gunn; W Scotton; J Briggs; W Flowers	Lost
5	J.J. Ferris	29 January 1887	Sydney Cricket Ground, Sydney	England	2	18.0	15	6	0.83	W Bates; A Shrewsbury; RG Barlow; JM Read; G Lohmann	Lost
6	Bob McLeod	1 January 1892	Melbourne Cricket Ground, Melbourne	England	1	28.4	53	5	1.85	WG Grace; R Abel; AE Stoddart; R Peel; JW Sharpe	Won
7	Albert Trott	11 January 1895	Adelaide Oval, Adelaide	England	2	27.0	43	8	1.59	AC MacLaren; A Ward; JT Brown; W Brockwell; R Peel; FGJ Ford; J Briggs; WH Lockwood	Won
8	Monty Noble	1 January 1898	Melbourne Cricket Ground, Melbourne	England	2	17.0	49	6	2.88	KS Ranjitsinhji; TW Hayward; W Storer; NF Druce; E Wainwright; JT Hearne	Won
9	Jack Saunders	14 February 1902	Sydney Cricket Ground, Sydney	England	2	24.1	43	5	1.77	JT Tyldesley; GL Jessop; LC Braund; CP McGahey; C Blythe	Won
10	Jack O'Connor	10 January 1908	Adelaide Oval, Adelaide	England	2	21.4	65	5	3.00	G Gunn; KL Hutchings; LC Braund; W Rhodes; J Humphries	Won
11	Ranji Hordern	17 February 1911	Melbourne Cricket Ground, Melbourne	South Africa	2	14.2	66	5	4.60	AW Nourse; SJ Snooke; JH Sinclair; PW Sherwell; SJ Pegler	Won
12	Clarrie Grimmett*	27 February 1925	Sydney Cricket Ground, Sydney	England	1	11.7	45	5	2.84	FE Woolley; JW Hearne; WW Whysall; R Kilner; AER Gilligan	Won
13	Tim Wall	8 March 1929	Melbourne Cricket Ground, Melbourne	England	2	46.0	102	6	1.66	DR Jardine; H Larwood; GE Tyldesley; G Geary; JC White	Won
14	Frank Ward	4 December 1936	The Gabba, Brisbane	England	2	26.0	66	5	2.52	CJ Barnett; AE Fagg; WR Hammond; M Leyland; J Hardstaff Jr; RMV Robins	Lost
15	Ian Meckiff	23 December 1957	New Wanderers Stadium, Johannesburg	South Africa	1	31.0	125	5	3.02	DJ McGlew; TL Goddard; JD Nel; WR Endean; RA McLean	Drawn
16	Graham McKenzie	22 June 1961	Lord's, London	England	2	29.0	37	5	1.27	ER Dexter; PBH May; JT Murray; GAR Lock; FS Trueman	Won
17	Dennis Lillee	29 January 1971	Adelaide Oval, Adelaide	England	1	28.3	84	5	2.22	JH Edrich; APE Knott; R Illingworth; JA Snow; RGD Willis	Drawn
18	Bob Massie*	22 June 1972	Lord's, London	England	1	32.5	84	8	2.55	G Boycott; MJK Smith; BL D'Oliveira; AW Greig; APE Knott; R Illingworth; JA Snow; N Gifford	Won
19	Geoff Dymock	26 January 1974	Adelaide Oval, Adelaide	New Zealand	2	27.0	58	5	1.61	JM Parker; GM Turner; BM Hastings; JV Coney; DR O'Sullivan	Won
20	Mick Malone	25 August 1977	The Oval, London	England	1	47.0	63	5	1.34	G Boycott; DW Randall; AW Greig; APE Knott; JK Lever	Drawn
21	Rodney Hogg	1 December 1978	The Gabba, Brisbane	England	1	28.0	74	6	1.34	G Boycott; GA Gooch; JM Brearley; IT Botham; G Miller; PH Edmonds	Lost
22	Terry Alderman	18 June 1981	Trent Bridge, Nottingham	England	2	19.0	62	5	1.98	G Boycott; RA Woolmer; MW Gatting; PR Downton; GR Dilley	Won
23	Tom Hogan	22 April 1983	Asgiriya Stadium, Kandy	Sri Lanka	2	25.2	66	5	2.60	S Wettimuny; RL Dias; A Ranatunga; DS de Silva; ALF de Mel	Won
24	Peter Taylor♠	10 January 1987	Sydney Cricket Ground, Sydney	England	1	25.2	78	6	3.00	AJ Lamb; DI Gower; IT Botham; JE Emburey; PH Edmonds; GC Small	Won
25	Tony Dodemaide	26 December 1987	Melbourne Cricket Ground, Melbourne	New Zealand	2	28.3	58	6	2.03	PA Horne; MD Crowe; DN Patel; JG Bracewell; IDS Smith; DK Morrison	Drawn
26	Simon Cook	20 November 1997	WACA Ground, Perth	New Zealand	2	10.2	39	5	3.77	NJ Astle; CD McMillan; CL Cairns; SB Doull; SB O'Connor	Won
27	Brett Lee	26 December 1999	Melbourne Cricket Ground, Melbourne	India	1	18.0	47	5	2.61	S Ramesh; R Dravid; M Prasad; AB Agarkar; J Srinath	Won
28	Stuart Clark♠	16 March 2006	Newlands Cricket Ground, Cape Town	South Africa	1	17.0	55	5	3.23	GC Smith; HH Gibbs; JH Kallis; MV Boucher; N Boje	Won
29	Jason Krejza*♠	6 November 2008	Vidarbha Cricket Association Stadium, Nagpur	India	1	43.5	215	8	4.90	V Sehwag; R Dravid; VVS Laxman; SC Ganguly; MS Dhoni; Z Khan; A Mishra; I Sharma	Lost
30	Nathan Lyon	31 August 2011	Galle International Stadium, Galle	Sri Lanka	1	15.0	34	5	2.26	KC Sangakkara; AD Mathews; S Randiv; HMRKB Herath; UWMBCA Welegedara	Won
31	Pat Cummins♠	17 November 2011	New Wanderers Stadium, Johannesburg	South Africa	2	29.0	79	6	2.72	JA Rudolph; JH Kallis; AB de Villiers; MV Boucher; VD Philander; DW Steyn	Won
32	James Pattinson♠	1 December 2011	The Gabba, Brisbane	New Zealand	2	11.0	27	5	2.45	MJ Guptill; BB McCullum; DAJ Bracewell; KS Williamson; LRPL Taylor	Won
33	Josh Hazlewood	17 December 2014	The Gabba, Brisbane	India	1	23.2	68	5	2.91	CA Pujara; V Kohli; AM Rahane; MS Dhoni; R Ashwin	Won
34	Scott Boland ♠	26 December 2021	Melbourne Cricket Ground, Melbourne	England	3	4	7	6	1.75	H Hameed; MJ Leach; JM Bairstow; JE Root; MA Wood; OE Robinson	Won
35	Todd Murphy	9 February 2023	Vidarbha Cricket Association Stadium, Nagpur	India	2	12	124	7	2.63	KL Rahul; Ravichandran Ashwin; Cheteshwar Pujara; Virat Kohli; Ravindra Jadeja; Srikar Bharat; Mohammed Shami	Lost
