= Town Cricket Club Ground =

Cricket ground in Hull, England

Coordinates: 53.7466°N 0.3604°W

The Town Cricket Club Ground on Argyle Street in Hull, England, hosted four first-class matches between 1875 and 1879.

North and South England XIs clashed on three occasions, while Yorkshire played Surrey in a County Championship fixture in the last match held there. W.G. Grace scored 126 for the United South of England Eleven in 1876, whilst Ephraim Lockwood scored centuries for the North of England cricket team on two occasions. Tom Emmett took 8 for 54 for the North of England in 1875. The ground was closed in 1897 and developed by the railway.
