= Elisha Rawlinson =

English cricketer (1837–1892)

Elisha Barker Rawlinson (10 April 1837 – 17 February 1892) was an English first-class cricketer, who played one first-class match for Lancashire County Cricket Club in 1867, thirty seven for Yorkshire between 1867 and 1875, six for the United North of England Eleven from 1870 to 1874, plus one game for the North of England in 1875. He played non first-class cricket for Durham in 1884 and 1885.

Born in Yeadon, near Leeds, Yorkshire, England, Rawlinson was a right-handed batsman, standing nearly five foot nine inches, who scored 1,120 runs at 15.34, with a best of 55 for Yorkshire against Nottinghamshire. He took 8 wickets at an average of 9.87, bowling right arm round arm fast, with a best analysis of 4 for 41 for Yorkshire against Gloucestershire. He took 23 catches, mainly at cover point.

He emigrated to Australia, officiating one match between Australia and England in Sydney on 28 to 31 January 1887; won by England by 13 runs after scoring a paltry 45 runs in their first innings. His colleague was Charles Bannerman, the scorer of the first Test century in 1877, standing in the first of his 12 matches as umpire.

== See also ==
- Australian Test Cricket Umpires
- List of Test umpires
