= Ullathorne =

Ullathorne is a surname. Notable people with the surname include:

- Charles Ullathorne (1845–1904), English cricketer
- Robert Ullathorne (born 1971), English footballer and football agent
- William Bernard Ullathorne (1806–1889), English Catholic bishop

== See also ==
- Bishop Ullathorne Roman Catholic School
