= Arthur Emmett =

Arthur Emmett may refer to:

- Arthur Emmett (judge) (born 1943), judge of the Federal Court of Australia
- Arthur Emmett (cricketer) (1869–1935), English cricketer
