= United South of England Eleven =

Itinerant cricket team

The United South of England Eleven (USEE) was an itinerant cricket team founded in November 1864 by Edgar Willsher, as secretary, and John Lillywhite, as treasurer. The USEE had no home venue as its prime purpose, like all similarly named teams of the time, was to operate as a travelling show and bring top-class cricket to places in Great Britain and Ireland which rarely received it. Fourteen USEE matches have been recognised by CricketArchive as first-class, mostly against the rival United North of England Eleven (UNEE). The USEE is estimated to have played 217 "odds" matches as a visiting team against local clubs which generally used 22 players.

The USEE was founded at a time of protracted antagonism between northern and southern professionals when the public's demand for exhibition matches was in decline. This was due to an excess of supply, as there had been several predecessors, and the growing interest in county cricket that was developing in the 1860s. But the USEE did succeed in prolonging its existence when it signed contracts with W. G. Grace and his brother Fred in 1870.

For the next ten years, until Fred Grace's early death, the Grace brothers ran the USEE as its match organisers, for which they received payment, but they played for expenses only. Although the Graces were an expensive acquisition, they were cricket's main attraction and were guaranteed to draw large crowds wherever the USEE played. As a result, the USEE continued to prosper while the trend among its rival elevens was to fade from the scene. The USEE was the last of the major travelling elevens to fold, having seen a decline in public interest through its last three or four seasons. The travelling elevens lost out in the cricket market to county cricket which burgeoned during the 1870s, ironically because of the Graces' county Gloucestershire. In addition, the public quickly warmed to international cricket which emerged at the end of the 1870s. The travelling elevens, which played largely meaningless matches against weak and unbalanced opposition, could not compete with the quality of top-class matches played by the county clubs against each other or a touring Australian team.

== Foundation ==
The USEE was created by Edgar Willsher, as secretary, and John Lillywhite, as treasurer in November 1864. It was part of the fall-out from a north–south schism within professional cricket which centred on bad relations between Nottinghamshire and Surrey. The two counties played each other in July 1864 but then the northern professionals boycotted an England v Surrey match and a North v South match later in the season. The southern professionals played in the North v South and won with embarrassing ease against makeshift opposition. Soon afterwards, they issued a statement that they would not honour the return match and this ended the fixture for some years. It was temporarily replaced by a match involving mostly southern players which was called North of the Thames v South of the Thames. In Scores and Biographies, it was noted that "the United South was formed at first entirely from secessionists from the All England and United All England Elevens, principally the latter body". W. G. Grace commented that "after 1864 the England and United England Elevens were seen very little in the south".

The most significant event in the USEE's history was a match in August 1866 at John Walker's Ground against a Southgate XV formed by V. E. Walker and his family. Southgate won the game by 3 wickets but, for the first time, the USEE team included W. G. Grace, who scored 0 and 2. Also involved was E. M. Grace but he only ever played for the USEE a couple of times whereas W. G. and Fred Grace would in time become the team's mainstays.

After their father died in December 1871, W. G. and Fred Grace increased their involvement with the USEE to finance both their home (they still lived with their mother) and their medical studies. They received payment from USEE funds for organising matches and claimed expenses for travel and accommodation whenever they played. For example, when the team went to Scotland in 1872, the USEE was paid £100 by their hosts to cover the costs and £5 each went to the nine professionals in the team, leaving £55 (which in 2013 would be about £3,300) of which the lion's share would go to the Graces with perhaps £30 to W. G. and £15 to Fred (i.e., about £900 and £450 respectively per match in 2013 terms). Since W. G. averaged ten USEE appearances per season through the 1870s, he was potentially receiving £10,000 per season in 2013 terms. This was not the end of it because he claimed appearance fees whenever he guested for another team, rightly adjudging himself to be the main attraction who was bringing in the crowds; and he claimed what he termed his "expenses" whenever he took part in a first-class match. By the standards of the time, cricket was a lucrative business for the Graces, especially considering that they held amateur status.

The peak of the Graces' involvement was 1873 when W. G. made 16 appearances, which was considerable in terms of the travelling involved and given his commitments to Gloucestershire, MCC and elsewhere. James Lillywhite was the team secretary at this time, in succession to Willsher, but W. G. and Fred effectively took over. Fred did most of the spadework, hardly ever missing a match and effectively running the team which he captained in W. G.'s absence. Indeed, it was on occasion billed as "G. F. Grace's United South of England".

== USEE matches against the UNEE ==
When the United North of England Eleven (UNEE) was founded in 1869, it soon established a regional rivalry with the USEE and the two teams met three times in 1870, the UNEE's first season. The UNEE got off to a flying start when they easily beat the USEE, including the Graces, at Lord's in July 1870 by an innings and 70 runs. In the next match at Bramall Lane, Sheffield, the UNEE won by an innings and 5 runs. The Graces did not play in this game. The teams met again at The Oval in August and this match was drawn, the USEE needing 33 more to win with eight wickets standing and W. G. Grace still in with 51 not out.

The teams did not meet in 1871 and their rivalry was renewed in 1872 when four matches were arranged although the last one at Leeds in September was cancelled. The first match at Bishop's Stortford in June was drawn. In August, the UNEE won by 8 wickets at Hunslet. In September at Northampton, the tide turned and the USEE recorded its first win over the UNEE by 8 wickets.

The elevens did not meet in 1873 and there were two matches in 1874 at Todmorden and Wellingborough. At Todmorden in July, the USEE won convincingly by an innings and 30 runs, largely due to a century by Henry Charlwood and ten wickets taken by W. G. Grace. The USEE won by 9 wickets at Wellingborough in September after the UNEE followed on.

There were no matches in 1875 and then the UNEE reasserted itself in 1876 with a win and a draw from two matches. The first at Fartown Ground, Huddersfield was won by 7 wickets after Andrew Greenwood scored 111. In the second match at the Town Cricket Club Ground in Hull, the UNEE was saved by an innings of 108 not out by Ephraim Lockwood but the highlight of the match was W. G. Grace's innings of 126 in a USEE total of only 159.

== Other first-class matches ==
The 1876 match in Hull was the last time the UNEE played the USEE although there was a curious footnote to the series when the USEE played against the official North of England cricket team on 6 & 7 September 1880. The North's team in this match at Rotherham bore little resemblance to the UNEE but, nevertheless, the official North hammered another nail into the coffin of the unofficial USEE with a 53 run victory.

The USEE had earlier played in two other first-class matches. These were in June 1874, when they played Yorkshire in Bradford; and May 1876 when they played the All England Eleven (AEE) at Lord's. The USEE lost both these matches. Yorkshire beat them by 26 runs. They lost to the AEE by an innings and 84 runs.

== Odds matches ==
According to CricketArchive's database, the USEE played in 217 matches in which they were the travelling team operating on an itinerant basis by taking on local sides that invariably had odds, typically using 22 players against the USEE's eleven. The first of these games took place at Dublin in May 1865 and the USEE fielded a strong team of Surrey and Sussex professionals, but the Ireland XXII managed a draw. The last-ever match was at Stroud on 9, 10 & 11 September 1880, just after the match in Hull against the official North. The match against the Stroud XXII was drawn. Poignantly, it was also the last cricket match ever played by USEE stalwart Fred Grace, who died eleven days later. According to Simon Rae, the United South died with him.

== Bibliography ==
- Altham, H. S. (1962). A History of Cricket, Volume 1 (to 1914). George Allen & Unwin.
- Birley, Derek (1999). A Social History of English Cricket. Aurum.
- Bowen, Rowland (1970). Cricket: A History of its Growth and Development. Eyre & Spottiswoode.
- Rae, Simon (1998). W. G. Grace: A Life. Faber & Faber. ISBN 978-0-571-17855-1.
- Williams, Charles (2012). Gentlemen & Players: The Death of Amateurism in Cricket. Phoenix. ISBN 978-0-7538-2927-1.
