= Arthur Emmett (cricketer) =

English cricketer

Cricket information
- Batting: Right-handed
- Bowling: Right-arm medium

Career statistics
Competition	First-class
Matches	3
Runs scored	12
Batting average	3.00
100s/50s	0/0
Top score	10
Balls bowled	348
Wickets	5
Bowling average	48.00
5 wickets in innings	0
10 wickets in match	0
Best bowling	3/48
Catches/stumpings	0/–
- Source: CricketArchive, 2 August 2021

Arthur Emmett (1869 – 12 November 1935) was an English cricketer. He was the third of six children of Tom Emmett and Grace Emmett.

Emmett was a medium pace bowler who played three first-class matches for Leicestershire County Cricket Club during the 1902 English cricket season. He returned his best figures of 3/48 against London County at Aylestone Road, Leicester, where his victims included the former Australian captain, Billy Murdoch. His third and final appearance was at Lord's against the Marylebone Cricket Club.

Emmett's father, Tom, captained Yorkshire between 1878 and 1882, and played seven Test matches for England, including the inaugural Test match in 1877.

He died on 12 November 1935 in Evington, Leicestershire.
