= Thomas Plumb =

English cricketer

Personal information
- Full name: Thomas Plumb
- Born: 26 July 1833; Aylesbury, Buckinghamshire, England
- Died: 29 March 1905 (aged 71); Northampton, Northamptonshire, England
- Height: 5 ft 10 in (1.78 m)
- Batting: Right-handed
- Bowling: Right-arm medium
- Role: Wicket-keeper

Career statistics
Competition	First-class
Matches	26
Runs scored	474
Batting average	12.81
100s/50s	–/2
Top score	67
Balls bowled	92
Wickets	3
Bowling average	11.66
5 wickets in innings	–
10 wickets in match	–
Best bowling	3/35
Catches/stumpings	27/15
- Source: Cricinfo, 24 June 2019

Thomas Plumb (26 July 1833 – 29 March 1905) was an English first-class cricketer. Plumb played first-class cricket for several teams between 1866–79, and was considered by some to be the finest wicket-keeper of his time.

== Life and cricket career ==
Plumb, who was born at Aylesbury, was considered the finest wicket-keeper of his time, with W. G. Grace describing him as ‘about the best wicket-keeper of his time.’ He was considered by others to have been the equal of Ted Pooley and George Pinder. Plumb was never attached to one of the major county teams of the time, playing for Buckinghamshire and Northamptonshire, then second-class counties. He made his debut in first-class cricket for the North in the North v South fixture of 1866. Between 1866 and 1879, he played first-class cricket for no less than eight teams, including for the Players in the 1869 Gentlemen v Players fixture. He also appeared for England teams, including the United England Eleven and the All England Eleven. Making 26 first-class appearances, Plumb scored 474 runs at an average of 12.81, with a high score of 67. Behind the stumps, he took 27 catches and made 15 stumpings.

Outside of cricket he was a publican, running the Queen's Head in Billesdon. In his later years he lived under poor circumstances, perhaps owing to the misfortune of not belonging to a major county during his career. He lived out his final years in a workhouse in Northampton, dying there in March 1905.
