= Charles Bannerman =

Australian cricketer (1851–1930)

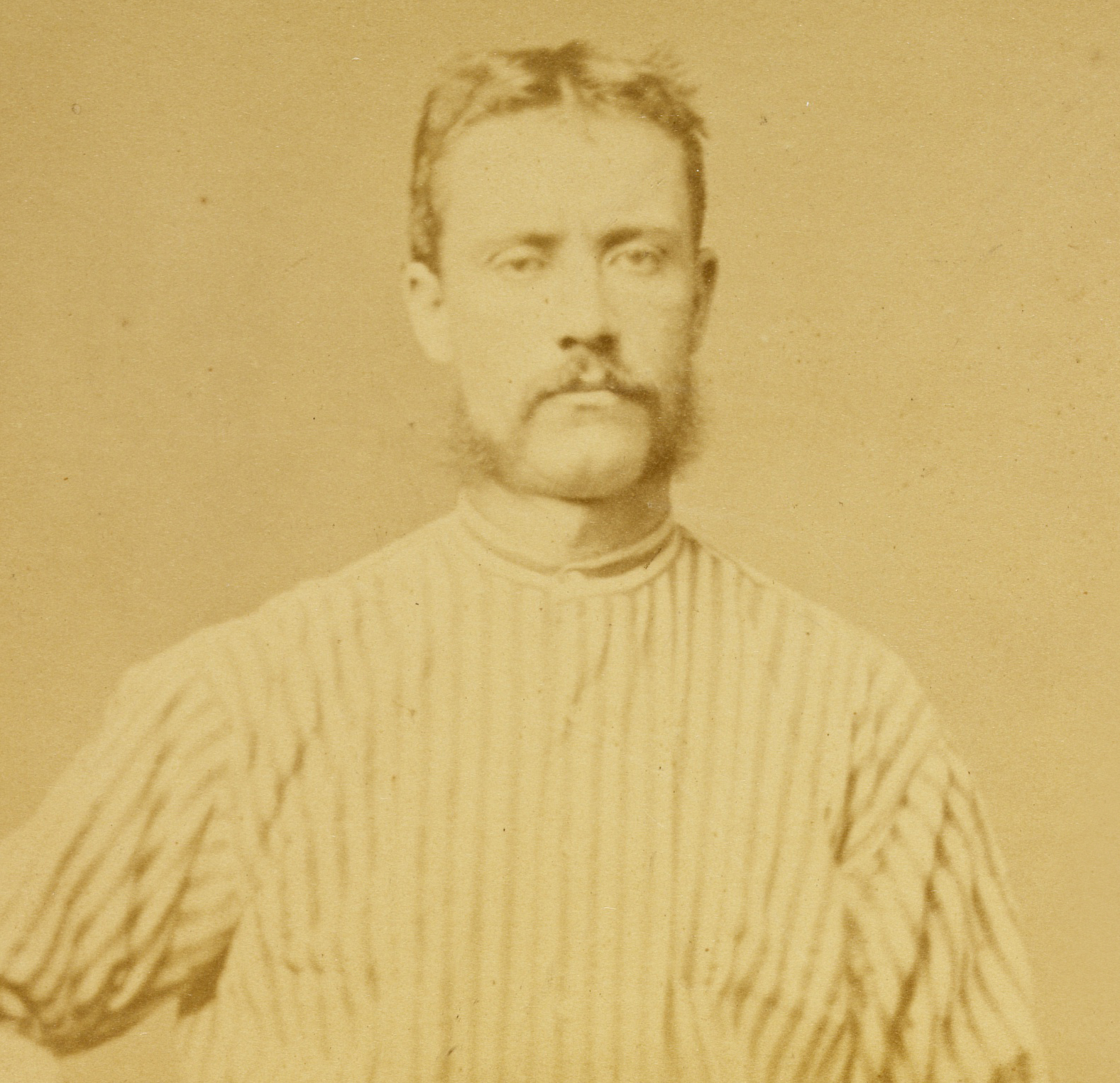
- Charles Bannerman, c. 1870

Personal information
- Full name: Charles Bannerman
- Born: 3 July 1851; Woolwich, Kent, England
- Died: 20 August 1930 (aged 79); Surry Hills, New South Wales, Australia
- Batting: Right-handed
- Bowling: Left arm medium

International information
- National side: Australia
- Test debut (cap 1): 15 March 1877 v England
- Last Test: 4 January 1879 v England

Domestic team information
- Years: Team
- 1870–1888: New South Wales

Umpiring information
- Tests umpired: 12 (1887–1902)

Career statistics
Competition	Test	First-class
Matches	3	44
Runs scored	239	1687
Batting average	59.75	21.62
100s/50s	1/0	1/9
Top score	165*	165*
Balls bowled	0	137
Wickets	–	0
Bowling average	–	–
5 wickets in innings	–	–
10 wickets in match	–	–
Best bowling	–	–
Catches/stumpings	0/–	20/–
- Source: CricInfo, 24 April 2020

Charles Bannerman (3 July 1851 – 20 August 1930) was an English-born Australian cricketer. A right-handed batsman, he represented Australia in three Test matches between 1877 and 1879. At the domestic level, he played for the New South Wales cricket team. Later, he became an umpire.

He is most famous for facing the first ball ever bowled in Test cricket, scoring the first run in Test cricket and making the first Test century. This innings of 165 remains the highest individual share of a completed team innings in Test cricket history, despite more than 2,500 Test matches being played since that first Test. Ironically in another first, he was forced to retire hurt, when a ball broke his finger.

== Early life ==
Bannerman was born in Woolwich, Kent, England to William Bannerman and his wife Margaret. Not long afterwards the family migrated to New South Wales, Australia, where he joined the Warwick Cricket Club in Sydney. At the club he was trained by William Caffyn, a former Surrey cricketer who was then a representative of New South Wales. Bannerman started playing professional cricket in 1871, before making his first-class debut for New South Wales. In his first match, against Victoria, he made 32 and 3 runs.

== Test matches ==
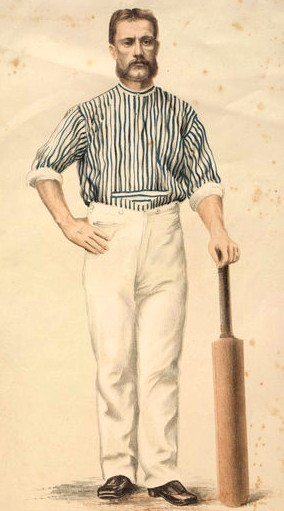
Bannerman faced the first ball in Test cricket and scored the first Test century

Bannerman played in the first three matches that were later designated as Test matches. The first of these, between Australia and England was held at the Melbourne Cricket Ground (MCG) in March 1877 and Australia batted first. Bannerman opened the Australian innings and is thus retrospectively deemed to have had the honour of facing the first ball ever bowled in Test cricket (the bowler being England's Alfred Shaw) and scoring the first ever run in Test cricket. Dropped before he reached double figures, he went on to score 126 on the first day and then added 39 on the second day to reach 165 when he was forced to retire hurt, his finger having been broken by a ball from George Ulyett. Only Harry Jupp (England) scoring 54 on the second day bettered Charles Bannerman's 39 runs on the second day. Again retrospectively, his innings was the first-ever Test century. It remains the highest score by an Australian batsman on debut and his 165 runs, out of Australia's total of 245, is still the highest proportion (67.35%) of a completed innings in a Test match. No other Australian exceeded 20 in either innings, as Australia won the match by 45 runs. For his feat, spectators at the match collected £83 7s 6d to present to him.

Bannerman played in two more matches now recognised as Tests, the second in 1877 and one in 1879. His Test record is 239 runs at an average of 59.75. At the end of the first Test on 19 March 1877 Charles Bannerman had become the first Test batsman to score 150 runs in a Test career. He finished the Test on 169. In terms of batting partnerships. Charles Bannerman and Nat Thomson were the first ever international batting partnership (the first ever international opening batting partnership) and they made 2 runs together before Nat Thomson was bowled by Allen Hill for 1.

Charles Bannerman was selected for the 2nd Test of the 1876–77 Series. He opened the batting at No. 2 once again partnering Nat Thomson. He and Thomson added 29 for the first Wicket when Thomson was dismissed for 18. Charles was then joined by Australia's wicket-keeper, batting at No. 3, Jack Blackham. However, after batting for 55 minutes he was bowled by Allen Hill for 10. He had now increased the record career score to 179. On the 3rd day (3 April 1877) Charles batted at No. 3. He came in when Australia were 88 for 1 to partner Nat Thomson. He partnered Thomson and Thomas Kelly. After just 13 minutes when on 30, he hit George Ulyett's bowling to Harry Jupp. He became the first, at that time, to score 200 runs in a career and now had scored 209.

On the first official Australian tour of England in 1878, Bannerman topped the averages and scored the first century by an Australian in England, but no matches recognised as Tests were played on this tour. He had a career first-class batting record of 1,687 runs at 21.62. He did not represent Australia again, officially because of ill-health, but it was suggested that he could not cope with celebrity status, and that gambling debts and alcohol left him impoverished. He continued to play for New South Wales until 1888.

== Umpiring ==
Between 1887 and 1902, Bannerman stood as umpire in 12 Test matches in Australia. His first match was between Australia and England at the Sydney Cricket Ground (SCG) from 28 to 31 January 1887. England won by 13 runs after scoring only 45 runs in their first innings. His colleague was Elisha Rawlinson, standing in his only Test match. Bannerman's last match, at Melbourne in the 1901–02 season, was also a close low-scoring affair with Australia winning by 32 runs. On this occasion his colleague was Bob Crockett standing in his first season as a Test umpire. In two of the matches in which Charles Bannerman officiated, his brother Alick was a player, but no accusations of bias could be made as Alick scored only 23 runs in four innings.

In the fifth Test of the 1897–98 series, Bannerman turned down a confident lbw appeal against Australian batsman Joe Darling when the match was in a tense situation. The lbw was reportedly "obvious" but the bowler had run in front of the umpire who was unsighted and had to reject the appeal. Darling, then on 50, went on to score 160 and Australia won the match. After the game Bannerman lodged an official complaint against the English wicket-keeper who had accused him of cheating, and the player was rebuked.

In all, Bannerman umpired 58 first-class matches between 1887 and 1905. In December 1892, he and George Searcy umpired the first-ever Sheffield Shield match. His last matches were the two played by the Australian touring team against New Zealand in Christchurch and Wellington in March 1905.

== Benefit and family ==
In the 1922–23 season, the first radio broadcast of a cricket match anywhere in the world was a match played as a benefit for Charles Bannerman, from which he received £490.

He died in Sydney, survived by his widow Mary Ann, née King, two sons and three daughters; three of the children were the issue of his first marriage to Ellen, née Neale.

== Bibliography ==
- Harte, Chris (1993). A History of Australian Cricket. London: Andre Deutsch. ISBN 0-233-98825-4.
- Pollard, Jack, Australian Cricket: 1803–1893, The Formative Years. Sydney, The Book Company, 1995. (ISBN 0-207-15490-2)
- Pollard, Jack, Australian Cricket: 1893–1917, The Turbulent Years. Sydney, The Book Company, 1995. (ISBN 0-207-15468-6)
- Pollard, Jack, Australian Cricket: The Game and the Players. Sydney, Hodder & Stoughton, 1982. (ISBN 0-340-28796-9)

Records
Preceded by First holder	World Record – Highest individual score in Test cricket 165 not out vs England at Melbourne 1876–77	Succeeded by Billy Murdoch
