= 1959 County Championship =

English cricket tournament

- Cricket format: First-class cricket
- Tournament format: League system
- Champions: Yorkshire (23rd title)
- Participants: 17
- Matches: 238
- Most runs: Mike Smith, (Warwickshire); 2,169
- Most wickets: Derek Shackleton, (Hampshire); 126

The 1959 County Championship was the 60th officially organised running of the County Championship. Yorkshire won the Championship title ending a seven-year winning sequence by Surrey.

== Table ==
- 12 points for a win
- 6 points to team still batting in the fourth innings of a match in which scores finish level
- 2 points for first innings lead
- 1 point for tie on first innings in a lost or drawn match
- 2 bonus points for team leading on first innings if they also score faster on runs per over in first innings
- If no play possible on the first two days, and the match does not go into the second innings, the team leading on first innings scores 8 points.

	Team	P	W	L	D	T	No Dec	1st Inns Lead	1st Inns Tie	Bonus	Points
1	Yorkshire	28	14	7	7	0	0	5	0	26	204
=2	Gloucestershire	28	12	11	4	1	0	4	0	28	186
=2	Surrey	28	12	5	11	0	0	8	0	26	186
=4	Warwickshire	28	13	10	5	0	0	3	0	22	184
=4	Lancashire	28	12	7	9	0	0	6	0	28	184
6	Glamorgan	28	12	8	7	0	1	7	0	20	178
7	Derbyshire	28	12	6	10	0	0	5	0	20	174
=8	Hampshire	28	11	10	7	0	0	5	0	26	168
=8	Essex	28	11	7	9	1	0	4	0	22	168
10	Middlesex	28	10	9	9	0	0	6	1	24	157
11	Northamptonshire	28	8	10	10	0	0	13	0	24	146
12	Somerset	28	8	13	7	0	0	7	0	20	130
13	Kent	28	8	12	8	0	0	7	0	18	128
14	Worcestershire	28	6	8	13	0	1	8	0	18	106
15	Sussex	28	6	11	10	0	1	6	0	18	102
16	Leicestershire	28	5	16	7	0	0	2	0	8	72
17	Nottinghamshire	28	4	14	9	0	1	4	0	6	62
