= 1968 County Championship =

English cricket tournament

- Dates: 1 May – 6 September 1968
- Administrator: England and Wales Cricket Board
- Cricket format: First-class cricket
- Tournament format: League system
- Champions: Yorkshire (29th title)
- Participants: 17
- Matches: 238
- Most runs: Barry Richards, (Hampshire); 2,039
- Most wickets: Bob Cottam (122)

The 1968 County Championship was the 69th officially organised running of the County Championship. Yorkshire won their third consecutive Championship title.

The method of obtaining points changed again for a third successive year:

- 10 points for a win
- 5 points for a tie
- 5 points for a team batting last in a drawn match with scores level
- 1 bonus point for every 25 runs over 150 and for every 2 wickets taken (in the first 85 overs only).
- 10 points for a win but no bonus points if less than 8 hours remain at the start of a match

== Table ==
	Team	P	W	L	D	NR	Bat	Bowl	Pts
1	Yorkshire	28	11	4	13	0	46	114	270
2	Kent	28	12	5	11	0	41	95	256
3	Glamorgan	28	11	6	9	2	42	85	237
4	Nottinghamshire	28	7	3	17	1	53	99	222
5	Hampshire	28	8	5	15	0	43	92	215
6	Lancashire	28	8	6	14	0	24	105	209
7	Worcestershire	28	8	7	13	0	26	97	203
8	Derbyshire	28	6	5	16	1	47	92	199
9	Leicestershire	28	6	10	12	0	52	85	197
10	Middlesex	28	8	6	14	0	21	91	192
11	Warwickshire	28	7	8	12	1	38	82	190
12	Somerset	28	5	11	11	1	36	86	172
13	Northamptonshire	28	5	6	17	0	34	86	170
14	Essex	28	5	6	16	1	31	88	169
15	Surrey	28	4	7	17	0	25	92	157
16	Gloucestershire	28	2	8	17	1	40	93	153
17	Sussex	28	2	12	14	0	43	77	140
