= Joseph Rowbotham =

English cricketer and umpire

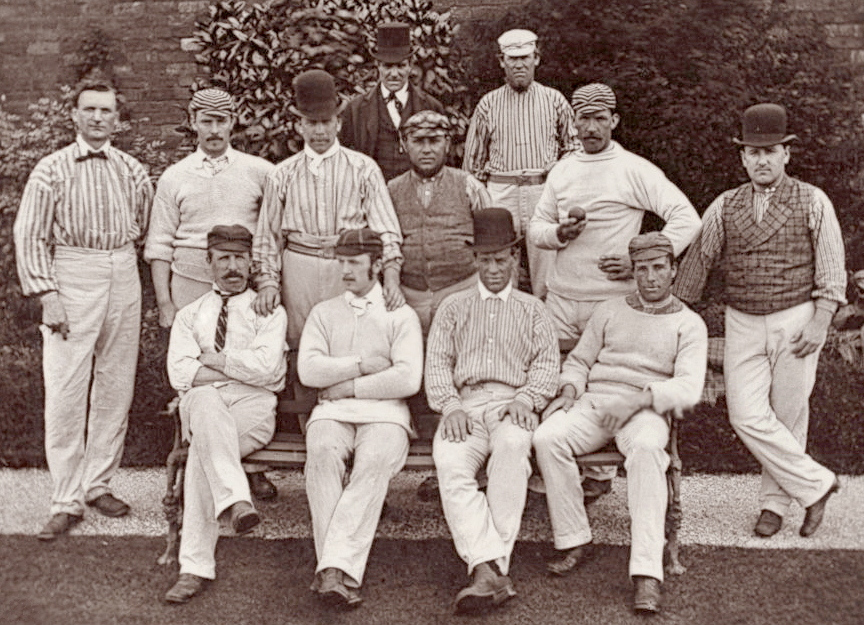
The Yorkshire team in 1875. Rowbotham, captain at the time, is on the second row, fourth from the left.

Joseph Rowbotham (8 July 1831 – 22 December 1899) was an English cricketer, who played for Sheffield Cricket Club (aka Yorkshire) 1854–62; and for Yorkshire County Cricket Club 1863–76. In addition, he represented Marylebone Cricket Club (MCC) in 1856; the North 1857–75; the All England Eleven (AEE) 1862–68; the Players 1864–69; an England Eleven in 1864; the combined Cambridgeshire and Yorkshire team in 1864; the combined Nottinghamshire and Yorkshire team in 1872; the United North of England Eleven (UNEE) 1870–75; and the Players of the North 1874–76. He played in minor and odds matches in 1865 on tour with the AEE.

Rowbotham was born in Highfield, Sheffield; died in Morecambe. He was Yorkshire's captain in 1873 and 1875. In 141 matches, he scored 3,694 runs at 15.92, with three centuries and a highest score of 113 against Surrey. An occasional wicketkeeper, he held seventy catches and completed five stumpings. He also took three wickets for 37 against Gloucestershire in his only bowling spell.

He umpired in one Test match: England versus Australia at Manchester from 10 to 12 July 1884.
