= Charles Ullathorne =

English cricketer

Charles Edward Ullathorne (11 April 1845 – 2 May 1904) was an English first-class cricketer, who played twenty seven matches for Yorkshire County Cricket Club from 1868 to 1875, three for the United North of England Eleven from 1872 to 1875, and once for the North of England in 1875.

Ullathorne was born in Kingston upon Hull, Yorkshire, England, and was a right-handed batsman, who scored 326 runs in thirty one first-class matches at an average of 7.40, with a best score of 28 against Surrey. He took 23 catches, but did not bowl.

He died from tuberculosis in May 1904, at the age of 59, in Manchester, Lancashire.
