= George Freeman (cricketer) =

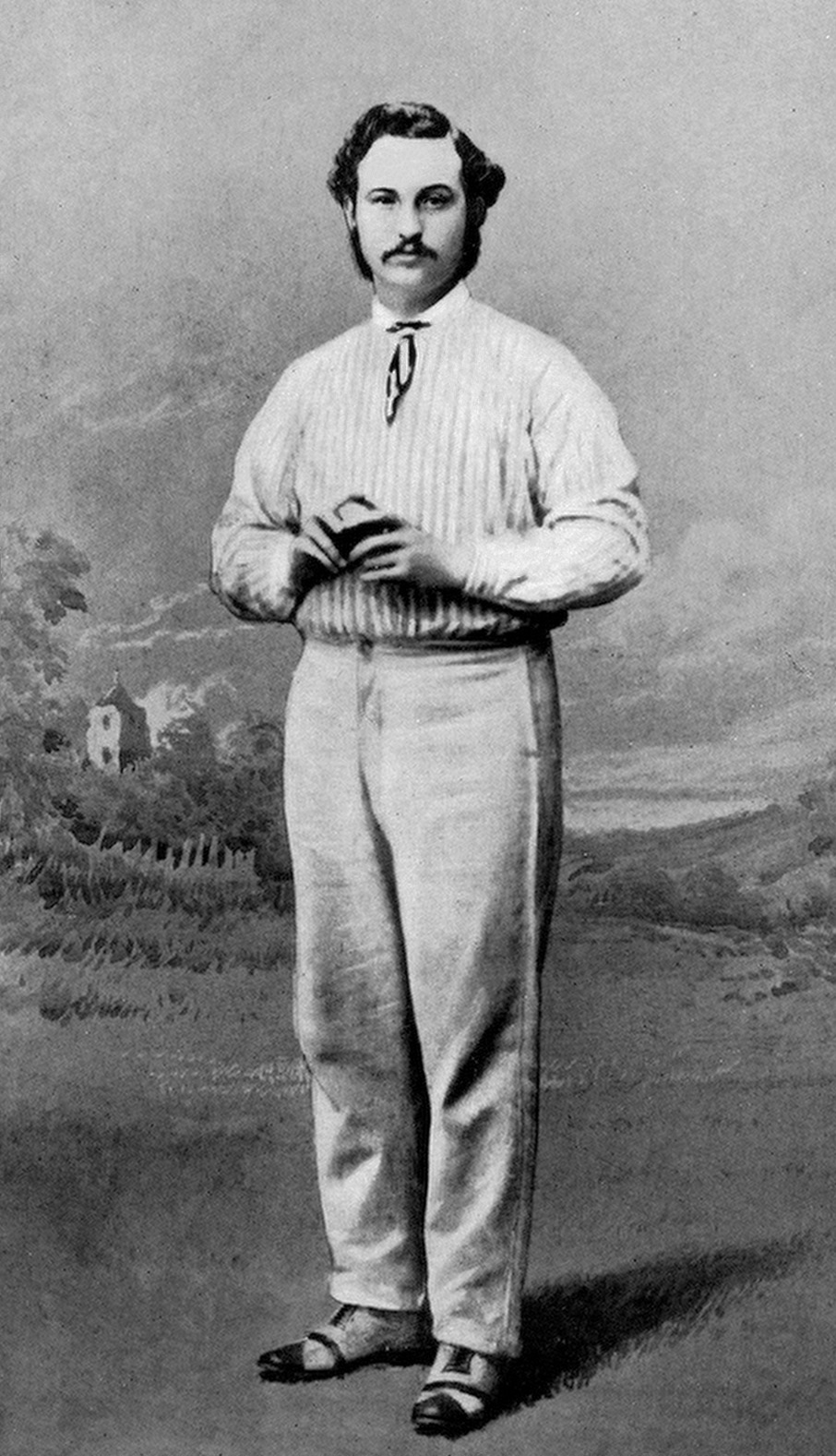
- George Freeman

Personal information
- Born: 27 July 1843; Boroughbridge, Yorkshire, England
- Died: 18 November 1895 (aged 52); Sowerby Grange, near Thirsk
- Batting: Right-handed
- Bowling: Right-arm fast

Career statistics
Competition	First-class
Matches	44
Runs scored	918
Batting average	13.70
100s/50s	0/3
Top score	53
Balls bowled	10,075
Wickets	288
Bowling average	9.84
5 wickets in innings	32
10 wickets in match	10
Best bowling	8/11
Catches/stumpings	20/–
- Source: CricketArchive, 2 August 2021

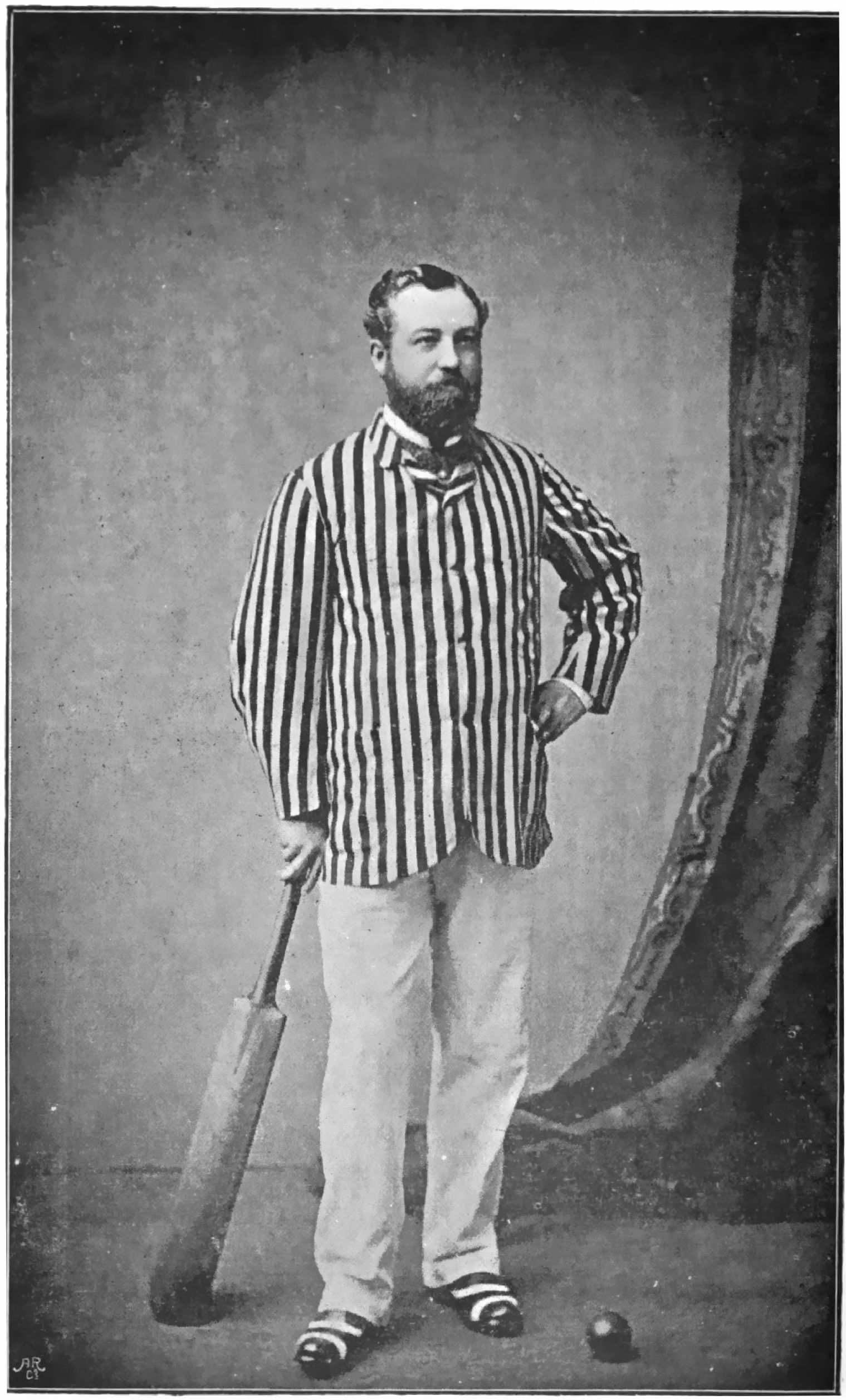
George Freeman

George Freeman (27 July 1843 – 18 November 1895) was an English first-class cricketer. He made 32 appearances for Yorkshire County Cricket Club from 1865 to 1880. He also played four matches of first-class cricket for the "United England Eleven" (1866–1869), three games for the "North of England" (1867–1869), four for the "United North of England Eleven" (1870) plus one for the "Players" (1871).

== Career ==
Born in Boroughbridge, Yorkshire, England, Freeman was a right hand, round arm, fast bowler, who began his career as a sixteen-year-old in Boroughbridge, where for Ten Boys of Boroughbridge against Ten Boys of Sessay he took fifteen wickets for 38 runs. Three years later, still in his teens, Freeman accepted an engagement with Leeds Clarendon Club, but was not taken up by the newly formed Yorkshire county club until 1865 under recommendation of George Parr. Freeman emerged after a few matches in 1865 and 1866 to jump straight to the top of the tree in 1867. He had tremendous "cut" from leg as well as pace, which was said by those who played against him to reflect a classic round-arm delivery and powerful twist extending as far up as his elbow. On the rough, even stony pitches that prevailed before the advent of the heavy roller George Freeman was a terror to even the best batsmen, with frequent shooters often being impossible for any batsman to stop. Between 1867 and 1871 Freeman took 269 wickets in a mere thirty-seven first-class matches for a phenomenal average of 8.94 runs per wicket. In these five seasons he conceded only 26.8 runs for every 100 balls he bowled and took one wicket every 33 balls he bowled.

Freeman's best analysis of 8 for 11 came against Lancashire in a Roses Match of 1868; however, his best match bowling record was thirteen wickets for 60 runs against Surrey in 1869 at Sheffield. In both these games Freeman and fellow fast bowler Tom Emmett bowled unchanged throughout both innings. Amongst other notable bowling spells are 6 for 44 against an "All England Eleven', 5 for 36 against Cambridgeshire, 5 for 14 against Kent, 6 for 26 against the Marylebone Cricket Club (MCC), 7 for 29 against Middlesex, 7 for 30 against Nottinghamshire, 13 for 68 in a match against Richard Daft's XI, 7 for 45 against the "South of England", plus 8 for 29 against Surrey.

After the 1868 season George Freeman went under Edgar Willsher to the United States and meant with tremendous success, taking twenty-seven wickets for twenty-four runs against Twenty-Two of Philadelphia, twenty wickets for thirty runs against Twenty-Two of Boston and in five games against odds taking ninety-three wickets for 201 runs.

Freeman appeared in a non-first-class game for a "Miscellaneous All England Eleven" against 22 of Ireland in 1869, when he took 4 for 19 and 6 for 5, to register 10 for 25 in the match.

He also scored 918 runs at 13.70, with a top score of 53 for Yorkshire against Surrey and, over the course of career, also took twenty catches. His other half centuries came against Lancashire and the "United South of England Eleven".

== Retirement from cricket ==
As early as 1871, George Freeman had started a business as an auctioneer and this restricted his appearances that year. Although he was not quite so lethal as he had been in the previous four seasons, it was still a surprise when Freeman did not play in the early matches of the 1872 season, reappearing only against Gloucestershire for his own benefit match. W. G. Grace scored 150 against him, and for the next five years Freeman, with a growing business claiming all his time, played only very occasionally in minor matches for the Malton club. In 1878, however, playing as an amateur, Freeman appeared in first-class cricket for the first time in six years against Middlesex at Lord's, but lack of practice and the improvement in pitches from the heavy roller and motor mower meant he could not take more than three wickets at a cost of ninety-one runs. He played once against each of the first two Australian touring teams, but took only two wickets in total. However, George Freeman still bowled with success for "Gentlemen of Yorkshire" teams as late as 1883.

== Assessment ==
Under the pseudonym "Old Ebor", Alfred Pullin (1860–1934) interviewed eighteen former cricketers for the Yorkshire Evening Post during the winter of 1897/98. After publication in the paper, they were gathered together for a book called Talks With Old Yorkshire Cricketers. Each player interviewed nominated George Freeman as the greatest bowler they had ever seen. W. G. Grace, not interviewed in the book, all but agreed with their judgment, dubbing him the finest fast bowler he had ever opposed. Even after the careers of Tom Richardson, William Lockwood and Walter Brearley were finished in the years before World War I, Freeman, along with John Jackson, was still thought of by cricket historians as among the best four or five fast bowlers to have played the game.

Freeman was not one of those featured as he had died in November 1895, in Sowerby Grange, near Thirsk aged 52. Pullin was forced to rely on the testimonies of team-mates and friends for his portrait. Pullin was the rugby and cricket correspondent for the Yorkshire Post, and one of the rare people included in Wisden's 'Births and Deaths of Cricketers' who had never played first-class cricket.
