= Thomas Bignall =

English cricketer

Personal information
- Born: 8 January 1842; Chilwell, Nottinghamshire, England
- Died: 19 September 1898 (aged 56); Hyson Green, Nottingham, England
- Batting: Right-handed
- Bowling: Fast
- Role: Batsman

Domestic team information
- Years: Team
- 1863–1878: Nottinghamshire

Career statistics
Competition	First-class
Matches	90
Runs scored	2,656
Batting average	18.31
100s/50s	1/19
Top score	116*
Balls bowled	156
Wickets	2
Bowling average	104.00
5 wickets in innings	0
10 wickets in match	0
Best bowling	1/12
Catches/stumpings	19/–
- Source: CricInfo, 15 July 2009

Thomas Bignall (8 January 1842 – 19 September 1898) was an English first-class cricketer who played for Nottinghamshire between 1863 and 1878 as a right-handed batsman and very occasional fast bowler.
