= George Pinder (cricketer) =

English cricketer and umpire

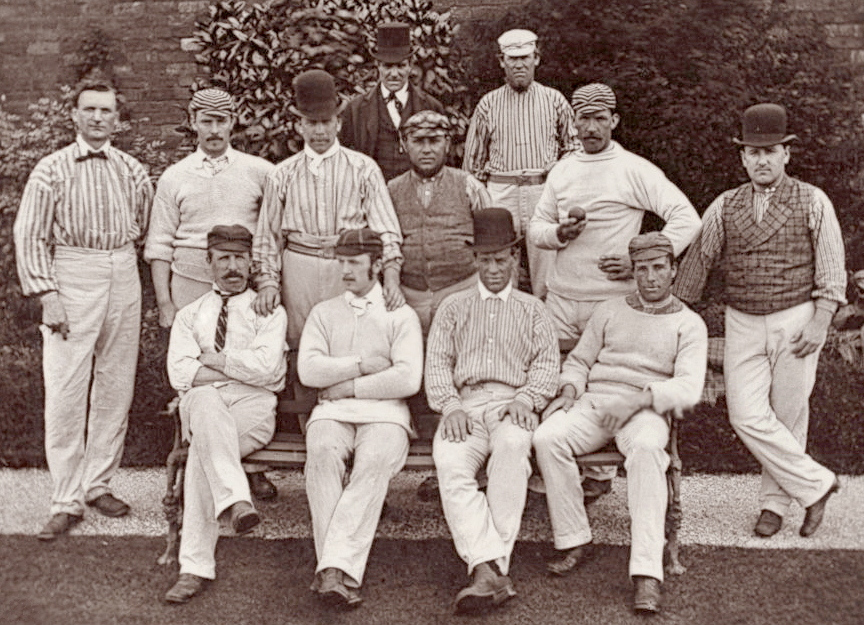
- The Yorkshire County Cricket Club team in 1875. Pinder is on the left of the second row.

Personal information
- Full name: George Pinder Hattersley
- Born: 15 July 1841; Ecclesfield, Sheffield, Yorkshire, England
- Died: 15 January 1903 (aged 61); Hickleton, Yorkshire, England
- Batting: Right-handed
- Bowling: Underarm slow
- Role: Wicket-keeper

Career statistics
Competition	First-class
Matches	179
Runs scored	2,415
Batting average	10.97
100s/50s	0/3
Top score	78
Balls bowled	1,144
Wickets	23
Bowling average	20.91
5 wickets in innings	0
10 wickets in match	0
Best bowling	4/56
Catches/stumpings	221/136
- Source: CricketArchive, 2 June 2024

George Pinder (15 July 1841 – 15 January 1903) was an English first-class cricketer.

His birth name was George Pinder Hattersley and he was born at Ecclesfield in Sheffield. A wicket-keeper, he played for Yorkshire from 1867 to 1880, and for the All England Eleven from 1867 to 1871. He also umpired in some matches between 1873 and 1880.

He was recognised as a fine wicket-keeper, his work to the fast bowlers – at a time when keepers "stood up" (i.e. within arm's reach of the wicket) to fast bowling – being particularly impressive. He had plenty of practice, since Tom Emmett was in the same Yorkshire team. He had to deal with Emmett's famous "sostenuter", a ball pitching on the leg stump and then breaking sharply towards the off bail. He was renowned for the slickness of his stumpings of batsmen. When Tom Hearne was stumped off a leg-shooter he exclaimed: "I don't call that stumping; I call it shovelling of 'em in!"

He is believed to have been the first keeper to dispense with a long-stop, during a North v. South match in the mid or late 1870s. The idea came from his captain A. N. Hornby. Pinder was at first reluctant, but the experiment was a success. On another occasion, at The Oval, Ephraim Lockwood who was fielding long-stop said: "Nay, George, I've been behind thee for twenty-three overs and had nowt to stop. I'm off where there's summat [something] to do."

Pinder died in January 1903 in Hickleton, Yorkshire, aged 61.

== Bibliography ==
- A. A. Thomson, Cricket My Happiness, Sportsmans Book Club edition, 1956, pp. 103–104
