= George Atkinson (cricketer) =

English cricketer

- Born: 21 September 1830; Ripon, Yorkshire, England
- Died: 3 May 1906 (aged 75); West Bowling, Bradford, Yorkshire, England
- Occupations: Cricketer, umpire

George Robert Atkinson (21 September 1830 – 3 May 1906) was an English cricketer, best known for playing in 62 matches of first-class cricket for Yorkshire County Cricket Club between 1863 and 1870.

== Career ==
A professional right arm medium face round arm bowler, he took 165 wickets at 17.17, with a best of 6 for 18 while, as a right-handed late order batsman, he scored 935 runs at 12.63, with a best of 66. He took 32 catches, and bowled with an economy rate of 1.96. After the end of his playing career, he served as an umpire in first-class cricket.

1863 was the first year of first-class cricket, and Atkinson appeared for Yorkshire in 1861 and 1862. He also appeared in first-class cricket for Yorkshire and Durham (1858), the United England Eleven (1859–1869), North of England (1859–1870), The Players (1863), England (1863), Cambridgeshire and Yorkshire (1864) and the United North of England Eleven (1870–1871).

He played against 22 Gentlemen of Hampshire for the United England Eleven in September 1860, in a non first-class fixture, and took 6 wickets for 15 in 32 overs, as the 22 Gentlemen were bowled out for 57 in 97.1 overs. He was run out for 4, batting at number 11, in England's innings but these runs proved vital as they enabled the United XI to take a first innings lead of 2. The 22 Gentlemen were bowled out for 47 in their second innings, with none of the 22 batsman passing double figures, and Atkinson taking 8 for 22 in 30 overs, in an unchanged partnership with John Lilywhite, who took 11 for 25. The England XI won by seven wickets.

He umpired at least 26 first-class fixtures, the first the clash between Gentlemen of the North and Gentlemen of the South in August 1859, and the last of them the friendly match between Warwickshire and Gloucestershire at Edgbaston in August 1894.
