= John Hicks (cricketer) =

English cricketer

John Hicks (10 December 1850 – 10 June 1912) was an English first-class cricketer, who played fifteen games for Yorkshire County Cricket Club between 1872 and 1876. He also played first-class games for the North of England (1872–1875), United North of England Eleven (1872–1874) and Players of the North (1876).

Hicks was born in York, and was a right-handed batsman, who played 21 first-class matches in total, scoring 423 runs at 13.21, with a best score of 66 against Surrey. A right arm fast bowler, he took three wickets at 23.33, all being taken against the United South of England Eleven. He also took thirteen catches.

Hicks in June 1912 in Holgate, York.
