= Andrew Greenwood =

English cricketer (1847–1889)

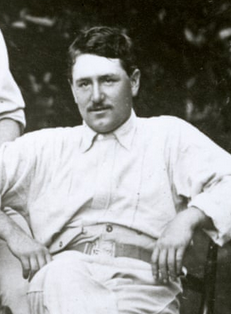
- Greenwood in 1876

Personal information
- Full name: Andrew Greenwood
- Born: 20 August 1847; Huddersfield, West Riding of Yorkshire
- Died: 12 February 1889 (aged 41); Huddersfield
- Batting: Right-handed
- Relatives: Luke Greenwood (uncle)

International information
- National side: England
- Test debut (cap 4): 15 March 1877 v Australia
- Last Test: 4 April 1877 v Australia

Domestic team information
- Years: Team
- 1869–1880: Yorkshire

Career statistics
Competition	Test	First-class
Matches	2	141
Runs scored	77	4,307
Batting average	19.25	18.32
100s/50s	0/0	1/18
Top score	49	111
Balls bowled	–	16
Wickets	–	0
Bowling average	–	–
5 wickets in innings	–	–
10 wickets in match	–	–
Best bowling	–	–
Catches/stumpings	2/–	70/–
- Source: ESPN cricinfo, 26 December 2009

Andrew Greenwood (20 August 1847 – 12 February 1889) was an English professional cricketer who played for Yorkshire County Cricket Club from 1869 to 1880. He was born and died in Huddersfield, West Riding of Yorkshire. He was a member of the England team which played in the first two Test matches, retrospectively recognised.

Greenwood was a right-handed batsman who scored 4,307 career runs in 141 first-class matches at an average of 18.32 runs per completed innings with a highest score of 111, his sole century. He scored 18 half-centuries. He rarely bowled but has been noted for his fielding. He was generally an outfielder and completed 70 catches.

== Career ==
Born in Huddersfield, West Riding of Yorkshire, Greenwood has been described as small in height, but a gutsy batsman, who was also noted for his fielding in the deep. He played his first-class cricket for Yorkshire from 1869 to 1880, but is best known as a member of James Lillywhite's team which toured Australia and New Zealand in 1876–77. He played in both the matches against the Combined Australian XI which were later recognised as the first-ever Test matches.

Greenwood made his career highest score of 111 when he opened the innings for the United North of England Eleven (UNEE) against the United South of England Eleven (USEE) at the Fartown Ground in Huddersfield on 13–15 July 1876. The USEE, captained by W. G. Grace, won the toss and batted first. They were all out for 102. At close of play on the 13th, Greenwood had scored 61 and led the UNEE to 132/4. He completed his century next morning but was run out for 111. The UNEE totalled 240 all out. The USEE batted again and were 159/5 at close of play on the second day, with Fred Grace on 75. He went on to make 95 in USEE's all out total of 211. Greenwood held two catches. The UNEE needed 74 runs to win and made these with seven wickets in hand. Greenwood didn't bat in the second innings.

== Death ==
Greenwood later suffered severely from rheumatism, and died of tuberculosis in Huddersfield in February 1889, aged 41.
