= Tom Armitage =

English cricketer (1848–1922)

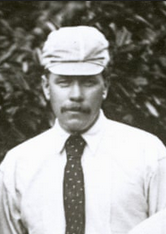
- Armitage in 1876

Personal information
- Full name: Thomas Armitage
- Born: 25 April 1848; Walkley, Yorkshire, England
- Died: 21 September 1922 (aged 74); Chicago, Illinois, US
- Batting: Right-handed
- Bowling: Right arm medium

International information
- National side: England
- Test debut (cap 1): 15 March 1877 v Australia
- Last Test: 4 April 1877 v Australia

Domestic team information
- Years: Team
- 1872–1878: Yorkshire

Career statistics
Competition	Test	First-class
Matches	2	57
Runs scored	33	1,180
Batting average	11.00	13.88
100s/50s	0/0	0/4
Top score	21	95
Balls bowled	12	3,845
Wickets	–	121
Bowling average	–	14.23
5 wickets in innings	–	12
10 wickets in match	–	3
Best bowling	–	7/26
Catches/stumpings	0/–	23/–
- Source: CricketArchive, 9 May 2012

Thomas Armitage (25 April 1848 – 21 September 1922) was an English first-class cricketer, who in 1877 took part in what are retrospectively recognised as the first two Test matches played by England. The players in these matches having been alphabetically sorted, Armitage is the #1 capped England player.

== Life and career ==
Armitage was born in Sheffield, Yorkshire. He made his first-class debut for Yorkshire against Nottinghamshire at Trent Bridge in 1872, opening the batting in the first innings. He failed to make much of an impression in the game, scoring 0 and 1, taking 0–19 from eight overs and taking no catches. He next appeared for Yorkshire in 1874 against the United South of England, but again did little.

Armitage's county cricket career took off in 1875, when he took 22 wickets in nine matches at just 7.59 apiece, including 7–27 against Derbyshire, and recorded the first of his four half-centuries, 68 not out against Surrey. In 1876, he played 12 games and claimed 45 wickets, taking 13–46 in a match against Surrey bowling underarm lobs, and making his highest first-class score, of 95, against Middlesex.

Armitage was selected for the tour of Australia that winter, and in the spring of 1877 played in the first two Test matches, both at Melbourne. He is credited with being the first player to represent England, due to alphabetical order, and is therefore number one in the order of Test caps. He bowled only 12 balls in the two matches, and scored 33 runs in three innings.

He played for Yorkshire for a couple of years more, achieving some success in 1877, when he took 42 wickets, but he declined in 1878 and played in only one match in 1879, for United North of England against London United. He then emigrated to the United States, and seven years after his previous game he made one final first-class appearance, for Players of United States of America against Gentlemen of Philadelphia, making 58 and taking 2–25.

Armitage died in Pullman, Chicago, in the US state of Illinois, at the age of 74.

Armitage's grandson, also called Tom, was a professional footballer for Sheffield Wednesday F.C. who died on New Year's Eve 1923, after suffering an injury on the pitch a few days earlier. Another grandson, Len Armitage, was also a professional footballer.
