= Tom Emmett =

English professional cricketer (1841–1904)

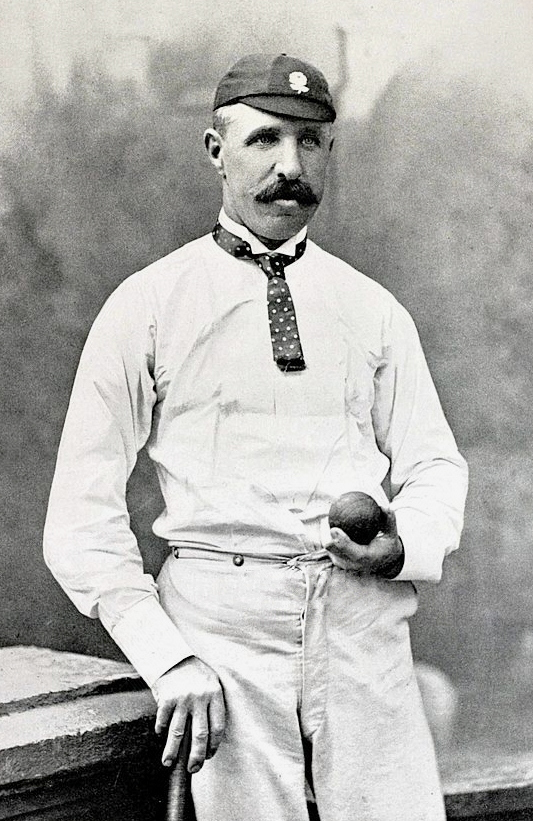

Personal information
- Full name: Thomas Emmett
- Born: 3 September 1841; Halifax, Yorkshire, England
- Died: 29 June 1904 (aged 62); Leicester, England
- Batting: Left-handed
- Bowling: Left arm fast (roundarm)
- Relatives: Arthur Emmett (son)

International information
- National side: England
- Test debut (cap 3): 15 March 1877 v Australia
- Last Test: 14 March 1882 v Australia

Domestic team information
- Years: Team
- 1866–1888: Yorkshire

Career statistics
Competition	Test	First-class
Matches	7	426
Runs scored	160	9,053
Batting average	13.33	14.84
100s/50s	0/0	1/24
Top score	48	104
Balls bowled	728	60,135
Wickets	9	1,572
Bowling average	31.55	13.55
5 wickets in innings	1	122
10 wickets in match	0	29
Best bowling	7/68	9/23
Catches/stumpings	9/–	276/–
- Source: CricketArchive, 26 December 2009

Thomas Emmett (3 September 1841 – 29 June 1904) was an English cricket bowler in the late 1860s, the 1870s and the early 1880s.

== Cricket career ==
Born in Halifax, West Riding of Yorkshire, Emmett first joined Yorkshire when almost 25 as a professional fast left-arm bowler with a near roundarm action, though in his later years he took to bowling slow-medium. Once discovered, however, Emmett climbed almost immediately to the top of the cricketing tree, playing for England against Surrey & Sussex in Tom Lockyer's benefit match at the Oval in 1867, his second season. An even greater bowler, George Freeman, was approaching his best at the same time, and, from 1867 to the end of 1871, they dominated the English bowling scene. After 1871, however, business commitments took Freeman away from first-class cricket, but Emmett stayed on and found another able colleague in the excellent Allen Hill. In later years, Emmett shared the Yorkshire bowling duties with George Ulyett, Billy Bates, Ted Peate and Bobby Peel. He called his most famous delivery the "sostenuter": after pitching on leg the ball would break back a long way to take the off-stump. As time went on, Emmett's pace deserted him.

Emmett captained Yorkshire for five seasons between 1878 and 1882, ending his connection with the eleven in 1888. He was the last professional to captain Yorkshire until Vic Wilson was appointed in 1960.

=== Test cricket ===
Emmett toured Australia three times and North America once. He played seven Test matches, including the first-ever in 1877, and was also the bowling mainstay for Lord Harris's team in 1878/9. According to J. L. Carr in his Dictionary of Extra-Ordinary Cricketers, on one occasion he "politely asked of an Australian fielder who had crept in close, if he was wed. He explained that, although he had no compunction about killing him, the death of a husband and father would vex his peace of mind."

In the first ever Test England lost the toss and were made to field in the 1st Innings. James Lillywhite, the England Captain led his team onto the Melbourne pitch, followed by the rest of the team including Tom Emmett. Tom Emmett was 35 years 193 days old, 77 days older than Harry Jupp, England No: 1. Tom Emmett was later passed, in age, by England No: 11, James Southerton and Australia No: 2 Nat Thomson as the Australian opening pair came out to bat.

== Personal life ==
Emmett married a woman named Grace, three years his junior, and had four daughters (Clara, Frances, Evelyn and Edith) and two sons, (Arthur, who went on to play for Leicestershire in 1902, and Albert). He died in Leicester on 29 June 1904 (not 30 June, as is widely reported).

Preceded by Ned Gregory	Oldest living Test cricketer 22 April 1899 – 30 June 1904	Succeeded by E. M. Grace
