= Ephraim Lockwood =

English cricketer

Ephraim Lockwood (4 April 1845 – 19 December 1921) was an English first-class cricketer, and captain of Yorkshire County Cricket Club in the 1876 and 1877 seasons.

Lockwood (left)

== Life and career ==
Lockwood was born at Lascelles Hall, Huddersfield, Yorkshire, England and was a right-handed batsman, right-arm slow-medium roundarm bowler and occasional wicket-keeper.

Lockwood played in 328 matches from 1868 to 1884, 214 of them for his native Yorkshire. He also appeared for Nottinghamshire and Yorkshire (1872–1883), North of England (1869–1883), United North of England Eleven (1870–1879), Players of the North (1873–1880), All England Eleven (1876), The Players (1869–1883), England (1874–1878), Gloucestershire and Yorkshire (1877), England Eleven (1879–1884), R Daft's American XI (1880), Over 30 (1880–1881), T Emmett's XI (1881–1883), Lord Sheffield's XI (1881), A Shaw's XI (1882), Lancashire and Yorkshire (1883) and the Rest of England (1883) all of them in first-class cricket. That he failed to appear in Test cricket is explained by the fact that Test matches only began in 1877, towards the end of his career. He did go on one tour, to North America, in 1879.

He scored 12,512 runs in 569 innings at 23.60. He made eight centuries, with his highest score of 208 not out coming against Kent. Lockwood also made 60 fifties. He took 232 catches, and made three stumpings on his infrequent foray as a wicket-keeper. Lockwood took 207 known wickets at 16.78, with a best analysis of 7 for 35 against the United South of England Eleven, when he also took ten wickets in the match. He took 5 wickets in an innings on seven occasions.

After bowling against Lockwood several times during the Australian tour of 1878, the Australian bowler Harry Boyle described him as "the most perfect batsman that I have yet seen. His style is not at all of the dashing order, but he rarely lets off a loose ball. But what surprised me most was his timing of the ball; he is without doubt the best timer I have yet seen, bar none."

Lockwood's brother, Henry Lockwood, also played sixteen times for Yorkshire. His cousin, John Thewlis, and uncle, John Thewlis senior, also played for Yorkshire, and he was related to the cricketing Eastwood and Bates families who also lived at Lascelles Hall. He was a loom weaver in his youth but became a professional cricketer, at first in league cricket with Kirkburton C.C. in 1864, and then Meltham Mills and Lockwood C.C. before being engaged by Cheetham Hill, Manchester in 1868, when he also made his Yorkshire debut.

After he retired from playing in 1884, he ran a sports outfitting shop for ten years in Huddersfield at 18 West Parade.

Lockwood died in December 1921, at the age of 76, in his home town.
