= North v South =

English cricket fixture

The North of England and South of England cricket teams appeared in matches between the 1836 and 1961 seasons, most often playing against each other but also individually in games against touring teams, Marylebone Cricket Club (MCC) and others. Until international cricket became firmly established towards the end of the 19th century, the North v South match was one of the major fixtures in the cricketing calendar along with Gentlemen v Players. Indeed, North v South was really the major fixture because it could potentially showcase the best 22 players in the country, whereas Gentlemen teams in the other match were often very weak.

In all, there were 155 North v South matches. The South won 62; the North won 55; 37 were drawn, and one match in 1889 was abandoned.

== Early matches – 1836 to 1838 ==
Cricket in the 18th century had been predominantly a southern game, played especially in London and the southeastern counties. It had spread to the northern counties by the 1770s and noted clubs were formed at Manchester, Nottingham and Sheffield which eventually became the basis of county cricket in the north. In the 1820s, a number of northern players such as Sam Redgate, Tom Marsden, Thomas Barker and James Dearman established reputations which made cricket promoters aware of commercial possibilities in a North v South fixture.

The inaugural North v South match was held at Lord's Cricket Ground on 11 and 12 July 1836 and the North won by 6 wickets to confirm their capability and potential. Barker took ten wickets in the match and scored the most runs with 25 and 12 not out. The North's victory caused a sensation and a return match was quickly organised. This took place at Barker's Ground in Leicester and the South won by 218 runs. Redgate for the North and William Lillywhite for the South took twelve and eleven wickets in the match respectively, but the outstanding performance was an innings of 125 not out by Alfred Mynn despite a serious leg injury sustained in practice. His condition worsened as the match went on and he had to withdraw. With insufficient medical resources locally, Mynn was lifted onto the roof of a stagecoach and secured there to be taken to London, where he was admitted to St Bartholomew's Hospital. The surgeon considered amputation but decided against it and Mynn was able to resume his cricket career in July 1838. Mynn's injury raised the issue of leg guards which were generally frowned upon at the time, but the legalisation of roundarm bowling in 1835 meant that bowling was much faster than formerly and, gradually, pads were introduced.

The next two North v South games took place in 1837 and 1838 and were won convincingly by the South. Interest faded and the fixture disappeared for eleven years until it was resurrected in the 1849 season. In the meantime (1840–48), the North played annual matches against Marylebone Cricket Club (MCC). A feature of North v South from the beginning was that players could represent either team depending on current residency or being "borderline", thus a player living in the Midlands might well change sides often. In the first four games alone, no less than six players represented both sides. The total appearances by players in the 1836 to 1838 matches were:

- 4 – Ned Wenman, Fuller Pilch, George Jarvis, George Millyard, James Cobbett, Sam Redgate, Thomas Barker, Tom Marsden
- 3 – Emmanuel Vincent, William Lillywhite, James Dearman, James Taylor, Thomas Beagley, Thomas Box, William Clifford, William Garrat
- 2 – Alfred Mynn, Bartholomew Good, Charles Creswell, Francis Fenner, George Rothera, Jem Broadbridge, Richard Mills, Tom Adams, William Hillyer
- 1 – Arthur Rich, Daniel Hayward, Edward Grimston, Frederick Ponsonby, Henry Hall, John Bayley, John Gibson, Joe Guy, John Wenman, Thomas Heath, William Clarke, William Dorrinton, William Ward, Will Caldecourt

== An annual event ==
From 1849, the match became virtually an annual fixture and was often contested two or three times in the same season. It was played four times in 1878. The revival was at Lord's on 16 and 17 July 1849 when the North won by 243 runs after William Clarke and John Wisden dismissed the South for 48 and 67.

There was a change to the fixture's naming convention between 1866 and 1868 when the River Thames became the dividing line and the teams were called North of the Thames and South of the Thames. This effectively restricted the South's catchment to the counties of Hampshire, Kent, Surrey and Sussex.

The match at Lord's on 27–29 May 1889 had to be abandoned without a ball being bowled, due to bad weather. Cricket magazine pointed out that three Lord's fixtures were abandoned during that month. Despite the loss of that match, the fixture was played another five times in 1889 at The Oval, Chichester, Old Trafford, Scarborough and Hastings. North v South continued annually through to 1897 but was not held in either 1898 or 1899. It was revived in September 1900 when two matches were played, both at southern venues.

=== United Elevens ===
During the 1870s the fixture received competition in the shape of matches between the equivalent professional touring teams, the United North of England Eleven and the United South of England Eleven. There were 11 games involving the United sides and then one (the last) in 1880 when the United South played against the official North. Other variations featured teams called Gentlemen of the North, Gentlemen of the South, Players of the North and Players of the South who played against each other on several occasions.

=== 20th century ===
The fixture's popularity waned as international cricket expanded and it was played less frequently in the 20th century. Following the two games in September 1900, there were only eight instances between then and September 1920, all of them in the 1904 to 1908 period. Between the two world wars, there were eleven matches. The fixture was resurrected in 1946 after the end of the Second World War and, except for 1953, was played annually, sometimes more than once a season, through to 1958. Then there was a three-year hiatus until the final match took place 6 to 8 September 1961 at Stanley Park, Blackpool, the South winning by two wickets. The fixture was finally ended by the advent of limited overs cricket, which left no space for it in an already crowded calendar.

== Revival ==
The last North v South contest of the 20th century was a one-day 50 over match at Trent Bridge in the 1971 season, which the South won by 9 runs. There was a temporary revival in March 2017 when a three-match series, under one-day 50 overs rules, was staged in the United Arab Emirates. In March 2018, a similar series was played in Barbados as part of the English county cricket pre-season schedule.

== List of North v South matches ==
Scorecards of all these matches from 1836 to 1961 are held on the CricketArchive database.

List of North v South matches
#	Date	Venue	Winners	Winning margin	Ref
1	11 July 1836	Lord's, St John's Wood, London	North	6 wickets	scorecard
2	22 August 1836	Barker's Ground, Leicester	South	218 runs	scorecard
3	10 July 1837	Lord's	South	5 wickets	scorecard
4	25 June 1838	Lord's	South	8 wickets	scorecard
5	16 July 1849	Lord's	North	243 runs	scorecard
6	30 August 1849	Parr and Wisden's Ground, Leamington Spa	North	9 wickets	scorecard
7	15 July 1850	Lord's	North	innings and 19 runs	scorecard
8	8 August 1850	Leamington Spa	North	innings and 118 runs	scorecard
9	3 July 1851	The Oval, Kennington, London	North	60 runs	scorecard
10	14 July 1851	Lord's	North	12 runs	scorecard
11	1 July 1852	The Oval	North	innings and 8 runs	scorecard
12	7 July 1853	The Oval	South	70 runs	scorecard
13	27 July 1854	Higher Common Ground, Tunbridge Wells	South	2 wickets	scorecard
14	28 May 1855	Lord's	North	18 runs	scorecard
15	9 August 1855	Tunbridge Wells	South	innings and 39 runs	scorecard
16	30 June 1856	Lord's	South	6 wickets	scorecard
17	7 August 1856	Broughton Cricket Club Ground, Salford	Drawn		scorecard
18	20 July 1857	Lord's	South	14 runs	scorecard
19	13 August 1857	Tunbridge Wells	North	8 wickets	scorecard
20	7 September 1857	Trent Bridge, Nottingham	Drawn		scorecard
21	12 July 1858	Lord's	North	4 wickets	scorecard
22	27 June 1859	Lord's	South	10 wickets	scorecard
23	15 August 1859	St Lawrence Ground, Canterbury	North	90 runs	scorecard
24	30 August 1860	Merefield Ground, Rochdale	Drawn		scorecard
25	17 September 1860	London Road, Sleaford	North	53 runs	scorecard
26	15 July 1861	Lord's	South	4 wickets	scorecard
27	5 September 1861	Aston Park, Aston, Birmingham	South	43 runs	scorecard
28	29 May 1862	Old Trafford, Manchester	Drawn		scorecard
29	21 July 1862	Lord's	North	innings and 10 runs	scorecard
30	21 May 1863	Old Trafford	North	10 wickets	scorecard
31	20 July 1863	Lord's	North	29 runs	scorecard
32	27 August 1863	Wavertree Road Ground, Liverpool	North	84 runs	scorecard
33	27 June 1864	Sleaford	Drawn		scorecard
34	11 August 1864	Old Trafford	North	9 wickets	scorecard
35	5 September 1864	Cattle Market Ground, Islington	South	innings and 29 runs	scorecard
36	12 June 1865	Lord's	South	52 runs	scorecard
37	7 August 1865	Canterbury	South	27 runs	scorecard
38	2 July 1866	Lord's	South	innings and 43 runs	scorecard
39	3 June 1869	The Oval	North	9 wickets	scorecard
40	26 July 1869	Bramall Lane, Sheffield	South	66 runs	scorecard
41	9 August 1869	Canterbury	South	8 wickets	scorecard
42	6 June 1870	Lord's	North	6 wickets	scorecard
43	8 August 1870	Canterbury	Drawn		scorecard
44	5 September 1870	Dewsbury and Savile Ground, Dewsbury	North	innings and 154 runs	scorecard
45	29 May 1871	Lord's	South	innings and 49 runs	scorecard
46	31 July 1871	The Oval	Drawn		scorecard
47	7 August 1871	Canterbury	South	100 runs	scorecard
48	29 April 1872	Liverpool Wavertree	South	innings and 20 runs	scorecard
49	16 May 1872	Prince's Cricket Ground, Chelsea, London	Drawn		scorecard
50	20 May 1872	Lord's	South	52 runs	scorecard
51	25 July 1872	The Oval	South	8 wickets	scorecard
52	5 August 1872	Canterbury	North	innings and 46 runs	scorecard
53	15 May 1873	Prince's	Drawn		scorecard
54	2 June 1873	Lord's	North	84 runs	scorecard
55	24 July 1873	The Oval	South	innings and 58 runs	scorecard
56	4 August 1873	Canterbury	South	7 wickets	scorecard
57	25 May 1874	Lord's	South	8 wickets	scorecard
58	4 June 1874	Prince's	North	3 runs	scorecard
59	17 May 1875	Lord's	South	10 wickets	scorecard
60	27 May 1875	Prince's	South	5 wickets	scorecard
61	28 June 1875	Trent Bridge	Drawn		scorecard
62	15 July 1875	Fartown Ground, Huddersfield	Drawn		scorecard
63	19 August 1875	Tunbridge Wells	North	innings and 58 runs	scorecard
64	2 September 1875	Argyle Street, Kingston upon Hull	South	23 runs	scorecard
65	6 September 1875	Tyler's Ground, Loughborough	North	125 runs	scorecard
66	1 June 1876	Prince's	South	153 runs	scorecard
67	5 June 1876	Lord's	South	85 runs	scorecard
68	17 July 1876	Trent Bridge	South	8 wickets	scorecard
69	20 July 1876	The Oval	Drawn		scorecard
70	7 September 1876	Milnrow Road, Rochdale	Drawn		scorecard
71	21 May 1877	Lord's	South	3 wickets	scorecard
72	31 May 1877	Prince's	South	innings and 162 runs	scorecard
73	21 June 1877	The Oval	South	1 wicket	scorecard
74	23 July 1877	Argyle Street, Hull	North	innings and 14 runs	scorecard
75	6 June 1878	Prince's	Drawn		scorecard
76	10 June 1878	Lord's	North	3 wickets	scorecard
77	27 June 1878	Trent Bridge	South	10 wickets	scorecard
78	19 September 1878	The Oval	North	innings and 123 runs	scorecard
79	2 June 1879	Lord's	North	49 runs	scorecard
80	17 July 1879	The Oval	North	9 wickets	scorecard
81	14 July 1881	The Oval	North	innings and 91 runs	scorecard
82	14 May 1883	Lord's	North	170 runs	scorecard
83	21 June 1883	The Oval	North	22 runs	scorecard
84	30 August 1883	Tunbridge Wells	North	innings and 38 runs	scorecard
85	2 June 1884	Lord's	South	66 runs	scorecard
86	25 May 1885	Lord's	South	9 wickets	scorecard
87	25 June 1885	The Oval	North	8 wickets	scorecard
88	9 July 1885	Old Trafford	Drawn		scorecard
89	14 June 1886	Lord's	North	9 wickets	scorecard
90	30 May 1887	Lord's	North	6 wickets	scorecard
91	5 September 1887	North Marine Road, Scarborough, North Yorkshire	Drawn		scorecard
92	8 September 1887	Central Recreation Ground, Hastings	North	27 runs	scorecard
93	13 September 1888	Hastings	South	47 runs	scorecard
94	16 May 1889	The Oval	North	innings and 25 runs	scorecard
95	27 May 1889	Lord's	Abandoned		scorecard
96	3 June 1889	Priory Park, Chichester	South	8 wickets	scorecard
97	11 July 1889	Old Trafford	Drawn		scorecard
98	5 September 1889	Scarborough	Drawn		scorecard
99	12 September 1889	Hastings	North	152 runs	scorecard
100	19 May 1890	Lord's	South	135 runs	scorecard
101	11 September 1890	Hastings	South	9 runs	scorecard
102	11 May 1891	Lord's	South	34 runs	scorecard
103	29 June 1891	Edgbaston, Birmingham	Drawn		scorecard
104	31 August 1891	Scarborough	South	6 runs	scorecard
105	10 September 1891	Hastings	Drawn		scorecard
106	30 June 1892	Edgbaston	North	6 wickets	scorecard
107	8 September 1892	Hastings	South	innings and 10 runs	scorecard
108	11 September 1893	Hastings	North	25 runs	scorecard
109	2 August 1894	The Oval	Drawn		scorecard
110	30 August 1894	Scarborough	Drawn		scorecard
111	6 September 1894	Hastings	Drawn		scorecard
112	2 September 1895	Scarborough	North	8 wickets	scorecard
113	5 September 1895	Hastings	South	109 runs	scorecard
114	7 September 1896	Hastings	South	5 wickets	scorecard
115	2 September 1897	Scarborough	Drawn		scorecard
116	9 September 1897	Hastings	North	8 wickets	scorecard
117	6 September 1900	Hastings	Drawn		scorecard
118	13 September 1900	Lord's	Drawn		scorecard
119	5 September 1904	Scarborough	Drawn		scorecard
120	8 September 1904	Hastings	North	10 wickets	scorecard
121	28 August 1905	Whitegate Park, Blackpool	North	8 wickets	scorecard
122	4 September 1905	Scarborough	Drawn		scorecard
123	3 September 1906	Scarborough	North	innings and 71 runs	scorecard
124	5 September 1907	Scarborough	North	7 wickets	scorecard
125	7 September 1908	Hastings	South	5 wickets	scorecard
126	10 September 1908	The Oval	South	innings and 54 runs	scorecard
127	2 September 1920	Hastings	South	52 runs	scorecard
128	20 September 1922	The Saffrons, Eastbourne	North	7 wickets	scorecard
129	23 June 1923	Old Trafford	South	38 runs	scorecard
130	9 September 1925	Stanley Park, Blackpool	South	96 runs	scorecard
131	25 June 1927 (Test Trial)	Bramall Lane	Drawn		scorecard
132	3 September 1927	Cheriton Road, Folkestone	Drawn		scorecard
133	8 September 1928	Dean Park Cricket Ground, Bournemouth	South	4 wickets	scorecard
134	18 June 1932	Old Trafford	Drawn		scorecard
135	13 June 1936	Lord's	Drawn		scorecard
136	22 May 1937	Lord's	South	6 wickets	scorecard
137	11 September 1946	Scarborough	North	130 runs	scorecard
138	27 August 1947	St George's Road, Harrogate	North	86 runs	scorecard
139	3 September 1947	Leyland Motors Ground, Kingston upon Thames	South	4 wickets	scorecard
140	6 September 1947	Scarborough	Drawn		scorecard
141	4 September 1948	Hastings	South	5 wickets	scorecard
142	4 September 1948	Leyland Motors Ground, Kingston upon Thames	Drawn		scorecard
143	1 June 1949 (Test trial)	Edgbaston	Drawn		scorecard
144	3 September 1949	Scarborough	Drawn		scorecard
145	7 September 1949	Hawker's Sports Ground, Kingston upon Thames	North	4 wickets	scorecard
146	2 September 1950	Hawker's Sports Ground, Kingston upon Thames	North	8 wickets	scorecard
147	6 September 1950	Scarborough	South	3 wickets	scorecard
148	1 September 1951	Hawker's Sports Ground, Kingston upon Thames	North	4 wickets	scorecard
149	6 September 1952	Hawker's Sports Ground, Kingston upon Thames	South	innings and 79 runs	scorecard
150	4 September 1954	Recreation Ground, Torquay	South	61 runs	scorecard
151	3 September 1955	Torquay	South	109 runs	scorecard
152	1 September 1956	Torquay	Drawn		scorecard
153	7 September 1957	Torquay	South	1 wicket	scorecard
154	6 September 1958	Torquay	South	38 runs	scorecard
155	6 September 1961	Stanley Park, Blackpool	South	2 wickets	scorecard

== Bibliography ==
- Birley, Derek (1999). A Social History of English Cricket. Aurum.
- Bowen, Rowland (1970). Cricket: A History of its Growth and Development. Eyre & Spottiswoode.
- Haygarth, Arthur (1862). Scores & Biographies, Volume 1 (1827–1840). Lillywhite.
