= List of Mankading incidents in cricket =

In the sport of cricket, Mankading (named after Indian international Vinoo Mankad) is the informal name given to running out the non-striking batter whilst they are backing up, which is when they begin to leave the crease while the bowler is in their final delivery stride.

This kind of run-out is part of the Laws of Cricket, but there is a long term unspoken rule regarding the spirit of the game. This unspoken rule suggests that the bowler or team should warn a player first before performing the run out attempt. This warning could be given verbally, or the bowler can perform the run out before withdrawing the appeal. Dismissals of this type can be controversial, particularly when no warning was given, and often involve the umpires having discussions between themselves and the captain of the bowling side in order to confirm if the captain wishes to continue with the appeal even though these dismissals are simple to adjudicate.

The first batter to be dismissed such a way in first class cricket was George Baigent of Sussex in 1835. The bowler was Thomas Barker.

The following are lists of Mankading incidents in major cricket matches. The batting team is listed first.

== Instances of Mankading in Men's Test cricket ==
1. Bill Brown by Vinoo Mankad, Australia v India, Sydney, 1947–48
2. Ian Redpath by Charlie Griffith, Australia v West Indies, Adelaide, 1968–69
3. Derek Randall by Ewen Chatfield, England v New Zealand, Christchurch, 1977–78
4. Sikander Bakht by Alan Hurst, Pakistan v Australia, Perth, 1978–79

== Instances of Mankading in Men's One Day Internationals ==
1. Brian Luckhurst by Greg Chappell, England v Australia, Melbourne, 1974–75
2. Grant Flower by Dipak Patel, Zimbabwe v New Zealand, Harare, 1992–93
3. Peter Kirsten by Kapil Dev, South Africa v India, Port Elizabeth, 1992–93
4. Jos Buttler by Sachithra Senanayake, England v Sri Lanka, Edgbaston, 2014
5. Shadab Khan by Fazalhaq Farooqi, Pakistan v Afghanistan, Hambantota, Sri Lanka 2023

== Instances of Mankading in Men's Twenty20 Internationals ==
1. Mark Chapman by Aamir Kaleem, Hong Kong v Oman, 2016 Asia Cup Qualifier, February 2016

== Instances of Mankading in Women's ODI ==
1. Charlie Dean by Deepti Sharma, England v India, Lord's, September 2022

== Instances of Mankading in Women's Twenty20 Internationals ==
1. Kevin Awino, Rita Musamali, Immaculate Nakisuuyi and Janet Mbabazi by Maeva Douma, Cameroon v Uganda, 2021 ICC Women's T20 World Cup Africa Qualifier, Gaborone, 2021
2. Marie Bimenyimana by Olive Ranedomoun, Cameroon v Rwanda, 2024 Kwibuka Women's T20 Tournament, Kigali, 2024

== Instances of Mankading in first-class cricket ==
1. George Baigent by Thomas Barker, Sussex v Nottinghamshire, Nottingham, 1835
2. Charles Wright by Thomas Barker, Norfolk v Yorkshire, Norwich, 1836
3. William Lillywhite by Thomas Barker, Sussex v Nottinghamshire, Nottingham, 1837
4. John Lefeaver by Thomas Barker, Kent v England, Bromley, 1842
5. Edward Martin by Thomas Barker, Hampshire v MCC, 1843
6. William Hillyer by Charles Taylor, Kent v Sussex, Brighton, 1846
7. George Boudier by Charles Arnold, Cambridge University v Cambridge Town and County Club, 1847
8. John Huddleston by John Kinloch, Victoria v New South Wales, Melbourne, 1861–62
9. Walter Wilson by Bill Hendley, Canterbury v Otago, Hagley Park, Christchurch, 1864–65
10. Richard Powys by Bill Hendley, Canterbury v Otago, South Dunedin Recreation Ground, Dunedin, 1865–66
11. Stoddart Campbell by Nat Thomson, Victoria v New South Wales, Sydney, 1866–67
12. Charles Wright by George Harrison, Cambridge University v Yorkshire, Cambridge, 1883
13. Ted Tyler by Alec Hearne, Somerset v Kent, Taunton, 1894
14. Tom Reese by Alexander Downes, Canterbury v Otago, Christchurch, 1894–95
15. Joe Hardstaff by Khadim Hussain, Lord Tennyson's XI v Sind, Karachi, 1937–38
16. A. G. Ramsingh by Narayan Sane, Madras v Central Provinces and Berar, Nagpur, 1941–42
17. John Smith by Ray Allen, Canterbury v Wellington, Wellington, 1943–44
18. Bill Brown by Vinoo Mankad, Australian XI v Indians, Sydney, 1947–48
19. Reg Routledge by Jonathan Fellows-Smith, Middlesex v Oxford University, Oxford, 1953
20. Gordon Barker by Wilf Wooller, Essex v Glamorgan, Cardiff, 1956
21. Hanumant Singh by Ashwini Chaturvedi, Rajasthan v Uttar Pradesh, Udaipur, 1959–60
22. Rudolph Cohen by Jamiel Ali, Jamaica v Trinidad and Tobago, Port of Spain, 1963–64
23. Mohammad Bashir by Bashir Mian, Railways v Lahore, Lahore, 1966–67
24. Anil Khanna by Rajinder Goel, Northern Punjab v Delhi, Delhi, 1966–67
25. Geoff Arnold by Saeed Ahmed, MCC Under-25s v Central Zone, Sahiwal, 1966–67
26. Ray Gripper by Barry Richards, Rhodesia v Natal, Salisbury, 1968–69
27. Douglas Morgan by Raymond Le Roux, South African Universities v Orange Free State, Bloemfontein, 1968–69
28. Dilip Sardesai by Kailash Gattani, Bombay v Rajasthan, Udaipur, 1968–69
29. Parthasarathy Sharma by Ashok Bhagwat, Rajasthan v Vidarbha, Nagpur, 1970–71
30. Roy Swetman by Robin Jackman, Gloucestershire v Surrey, Bristol, 1972
31. Khatib Rizwan by Intikhab Ahmed, Rawalpindi v Lahore B, Rawalpindi, 1972–73
32. Vaman Kumar by Daitala Meherbaba, Tamil Nadu v Andhra, Salem, 1974–75
33. Albert Padmore by Rex Collymore, Barbados v Guyana, Bridgetown, 1974–75
34. Alex Barrow by Murali Kartik, Somerset v Surrey, Taunton, 2012
35. Sandipan Das by Murali Kartik, Bengal v Railways, Delhi, 2013–14

== Instances of Mankading in Twenty20 cricket ==
1. Jos Buttler by Ravichandran Ashwin, Rajasthan Royals Vs Kings XI Punjab, IPL 2019, March 2019
2. Noor Ali Zadran by Dawlat Zadran, Kabul Eagles vs Mis Ainak Knights, Shpageeza Cricket League, September 2020

== Instances of Mankading in Women's List-A cricket ==
1. Sanjula Naik by Kanika Ahuja, Punjab v Goa, Bangalore, 2021

== Instances of Mankading in Men's Under-19 Internationals ==
1. Richard Ngarava out by Keemo Paul, 2016 Under-19 World Cup
2. Mohammad Huraira out by Noor Ahmad, 2020 Under-19 World Cup
3. Mushfik Hasan out by Nangeyalia Kharoti, 2021
4. John Kariko out by Joseph Baguma, 2022 Under-19 World Cup
5. Ewald Schreuder out by Naseer Khan Maroofkhil, 2024 Under-19 World Cup

== Instances of Mankading in Women's Under-19 Internationals ==
1. Sharila Niyomuhoza (Rwanda) by Zaib-un-Nisa (Pakistan), 2023 ICC Under-19 Women's T20 World Cup

== Instances of Mankading attempts not resulting in dismissals ==
1. Courtney Walsh of the West Indies refused to Mankad last man Saleem Jaffar of Pakistan in a group match in the 1987 World Cup, but let him off with a warning. Pakistan went on to win the match while the defeat contributed to the West Indies failing to progress to the semi-final.
2. Amir Sohail of Pakistan warned Dean Jones and denied a clear Mankading chance in Tri Nation Series.
3. Peter Kirsten by Kapil Dev, South Africa v India, Port Elizabeth, 1992–93, India in South Africa ODI Series – 2nd ODI, Kapil Dev warned Peter Kirsten after not Mankading him. However, Kirsten backed up again and Kapil mankaded him in second instance.
4. Mohammad Rafique of Bangladesh did not run out Umar Gul of Pakistan in a 2003 Test match in Multan. Pakistan eventually won the Test match by one wicket.
5. Ravichandran Ashwin of India Mankaded Lahiru Thirimanne of Sri Lanka in a group match in the Commonwealth Bank Series 2012 held in Australia. However the standing umpires, Paul Reiffel and Billy Bowden, after discussion asked India if they wanted to reconsider the appeal and Indian captain Virender Sehwag withdrew the appeal. Sehwag told them that Ashwin had warned Thirimanne before running him out, however Mahela Jayawardene, the Sri Lanka captain, said he was not aware of the warning.
6. At the 2012 ICC World Twenty20 in the Super Eight stage match between West Indies and England, Chris Gayle did not Mankad Eoin Morgan but only gestured funnily of having Morgan Mankaded. Eventually West Indies won the match by 15 runs.
7. During IPL 2019, Krunal Pandya (Mumbai Indians) chose not to run out Mayank Agarwal (Kings XI Punjab), in a game which Punjab won.
8. During 2020 ICC Women's T20 World Cup in the group stage match between England Women and South Africa Women, Katherine Brunt did not Mankad Suné Luus. But the on strike batter Mignon du Preez hit six and four consecutively on the over and won the match by 6 wickets.
9. During the 2020 Indian Premier League, Ravichandran Ashwin (Delhi Capitals) chose not to Mankad Aaron Finch (Royal Challengers Bangalore), in the game which Delhi won.
10. Mitchell Starc warned Theunis de Bruyn twice during the South African Tour of Australia 2022-23 but chose not to Mankad.
11. During the 2022–23 Big Bash League season, Adam Zampa (Melbourne Stars) attempted to Mankad Tom Rogers (Melbourne Renegades), but the appeal was refused as the bowler's arm had gone past the vertical.
12. In a Women's Under-19 T20I between India and South Africa in January 2023, Mannat Kashyap Mankaded Jenna Evans, but the Indian captain Shafali Verma withdrew the appeal.
13. During the Guwahati ODI between India and Sri Lanka in 2023, Mohammed Shami Mankaded Dasun Shanaka when Shanaka was batting at 98. But the Indian captain Rohit Sharma withdrew the appeal.
14. During a Bangladesh vs New Zealand ODI match in 2023, Bangladesh captain Litton Das and bowler Hasan Mahmud called back Ish Sodhi after he was deemed run out at the non-strikers' end.
15. During the 2025 Indian Premier League, Digvesh Rathi attempted to mankad Jitesh Sharma and based on the telecast audio, the TV umpire decided that the batsman was not out, as the TV umpire opined the bowler had completed his delivery stride. LSG captain Rishabh Pant withdrew the appeal. There is controversy about whether the TV umpire made the right call, due to scope for ambiguity in Law 38.3 which talks about the point in time when "bowler would normally have been expected to release the ball." This has been interpreted by some, including the TV umpire, that the bowler completing the delivery stride preempts Mankading. Others interpret the wording to mean the Mankading attempt is valid until the bowler completes his action beyond the normal release point. Jitesh went on to score a match-winning 85* in 33 balls that took his team RCB to qualifier-1.

== Representation in popular culture ==
In Bodyline, the dramatisation of the notorious Bodyline tour of 1932–33, the controversial England captain Douglas Jardine is represented early in his career as encouraging a bowler to Mankad an opponent without giving a prior warning. Jardine's action is excused in the dramatisation by Lord Harris, who is represented as saying he had done the same in his playing career. While this represents Jardine's (and his supporters') perceived willingness to resort to sharp practice, there is in fact no evidence that Jardine or Harris initiated such an instance as captains, and no record of such an incident in first-class cricket. Instead, it might have been a reference to Harris' act for Eton against Harrow at Lord's in 1870.

In the Bollywood film Lagaan, one of the English bowlers Mankads one of the Indian team's players after his runner backed up.
