= Sam Redgate =

English cricketer (1810–1851)

Samuel Redgate (27 July 1810 – 13 April 1851) was an English professional cricketer who played for Nottingham Cricket Club and Nottinghamshire County Cricket Club between the 1830 and 1846 seasons. He was born in Arnold, Nottinghamshire, and died in Radford, Nottingham. Redgate was an outstanding right arm fast bowler, using the roundarm style. He batted right-handed, and occasionally played as a wicket-keeper.

== Career ==
=== Single wicket ===
In July 1831, Redgate played a single wicket match against Tom Heath, another Nottinghm player. It took Redgate over an hour to open his score, and was then run out by Heath who had thrown the ball an estimated 87 yards to hit the middle stump. Redgate is known to have played in other single wicket matches between 1832 and 1844.

=== Injury to Alfred Mynn ===
In August 1836, during the inaugural North v South match at Barker's Ground in Leicester, Redgate's deliveries hit Alfred Mynn several times, and caused a serious leg injury that almost resulted in amputation. Mynn's leg was saved, and he recovered, but could not play again until 1838. Despite his injury, Mynn scored 125 not out, enabling the South to win by 218 runs. Redgate took twelve wickets in the match, with five in the first innings, and seven in the second. Ten of the batsmen were bowled; the other two were caught by George Rothera and Charles Creswell.

Redgate reportedly said after the match:

That was Mr Mynn's day, that was. It mattered not what length I bowled him, the better I bowled the harder he hit me away.

It is generally held that the incident was the catalyst for the use of batting pads becoming commonplace.

=== End of career ===
Haygarth said Redgate was forced to retire after the 1846 season, because his health was deteriorating.

Redgate is recorded in a total of 79 historically important matches, and took an impressive 426 known wickets. (Note: During Redgate's career, wickets were not always credited to the bowler if the batsman was caught or stumped, so the number of dismissals due to him was probably much higher than 426.) His best bowling performance was 8 wickets (runs conceded unknown) for the North against Marylebone Cricket Club (MCC) at Burton-on-Trent in September 1840. In his known matches, Redgate took five wickets in an innings (5wI) 31 times, and ten wickets in a match (10wM) eleven times.

As a batsman, Redgate was a "slashing hitter", but he had poor defence, and was usually dismissed cheaply. In his known important matches, he is credited with 1,011 runs at 8.71 with a highest score of 41; he held 61 catches, and completed two stumpings.

== Pace and style ==
Redgate was the most feared fast bowler in England when he was at his best. Arthur Haygarth described him as "very famous indeed", and says that, for a few years, he was "one of the best round-armed bowlers that has yet appeared". Haygarth wrote this in the early 1860s, when roundarm was about to be superseded by overarm.

Redgate earned his reputation by bowling at a speed unforeseen before roundarm bowling became the established style. He was more than just a pace bowler, however, because he could also spin the ball, and he combined speed and spin with changes of pace. Haygarth said Redgate's bowling was "very fast and ripping", but he always played fairly, and had a "beautiful easy delivery".

== Personal life ==
Redgate was a lace maker by trade. He was married with several children. He was reportedly 5 ft 8.75in. tall, and his usual weight was about 12 stones. Redgate was considered unusual in a fashion sense, because he disliked trousers. Instead, he always wore the old-style knee breeches and stockings.

Haygarth said Redgate's "constitution (failed) him", but David Frith commented on Redgate's habit of drinking a glass of brandy whenever he dismissed a batsman. Drink forced him to retire in ill health at 36, and to die a "broken man" at 40.

== Bibliography ==
- Frith, David (1975). The Fast Men. Transworld Publishing. ISBN 978-05-52104-35-7.
- Haygarth, Arthur (1997) [1862]. Scores & Biographies, Volume 2 (1827–1840). Kennington: Frederick Lillywhite. ISBN 978-19-00592-23-9.
- Major, John (2007). More Than A Game. London: HarperCollins. ISBN 978-00-07183-64-7 – via Internet Archive.
