= History of Test cricket from 1877 to 1883 =

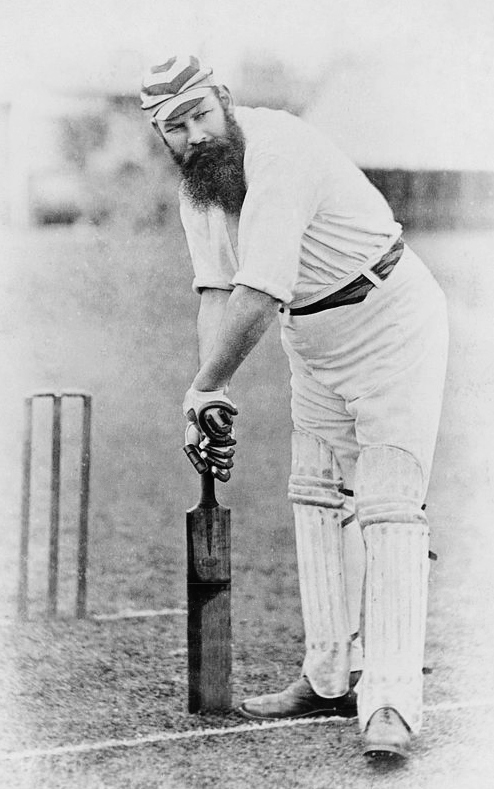
The legendary W. G. Grace, who played Test cricket until he was aged 50.

Test matches in the period 1877 to 1883 were organised somewhat differently from international cricket matches today. All were between Australian and English sides, the teams were rarely representative, and the lengthy boat trip required was one that many cricketers (especially amateurs) were unable or unwilling to undertake. As such, the home teams enjoyed a great advantage.

Thirteen Test matches were played during the period between Australian and English sides. Most were not styled as representative "England v. Australia" contests, however: this description was only applied later by cricket statisticians. The same is true of their designation as "Test matches", which did not enter into the vernacular until 1885. Eleven of the thirteen matches played to 1883 were in Australia, where the colonials made the most of their home advantage, winning seven while England won four, and two matches were drawn.

By 1883, the tradition of England-Australia tours was well established, that year having concluded the first Ashes series. When England lost at home for the first time in 1882, The Sporting Times lamented the death of cricket in the mother country and declared that "the body will be cremated and the ashes taken to Australia". England captain Ivo Bligh promised that on the tour to Australia in 1882–83 he would regain "the ashes" and the term began to be established. During that tour a small terracotta urn was presented to Bligh by a group of Melbourne women. The urn is commonly, but erroneously, believed to be the trophy of the Ashes series, but it has never been formally adopted as such and Bligh always considered it to be a personal gift.

A number of the problems that continue to bedevil cricket today had already surfaced by 1883: there were umpiring disputes, betting controversies, match-fixing, and even a riot.

== Genesis of Test cricket ==
There was a long build-up to what became the first Test tour. The inaugural overseas visit of leading English cricketers was organised by John Sackville, 3rd Duke of Dorset, a strong player himself. Having recently been an ambassador to France, where he promoted the game of cricket, Dorset arranged a tour to that country in 1789. Although it is unclear against whom they were to play, his men did get as far as an assembly in Dover, ready for the cross-Channel trip to France. The Duke's timing was poor, however, for the French Revolution had just broken out. His cricket tour became the first one to be abandoned for political reasons.

It was not until the 19th century that strong "England" teams began to form. By the late 18th, there were many games played by sides designated "England" – "England" vs "Hambledon" and "England" vs "Kent", for instance – but these were not truly representative. By 1846, however, William Clarke, a bricklayer from Nottingham, had formed the All England Eleven, a mostly professional team of top cricketers who toured the country, taking on local sides. Leading amateurs such as Alfred Mynn also played on occasion. Matches were usually against the odds, with eleven men in their team versus 22 for the opposition, to make it a more interesting and even contest.

In 1852, together with fellow Sussex man Jemmy Dean, John Wisden founded the United All England Eleven, providing both financial and sporting competition to Clarke's side. The matches between these two became the highlight of every English season, and the teams, both essentially business ventures, went a long way to popularising the game in England.

The year 1859 saw the first main representative tour by an England team. It was captained by George Parr and comprised six players from the All England Eleven, together with another six from the United England Eleven. The team toured United States and Canada, where cricket was very popular. The match in New York, for example, is said to have been watched by 10,000 people, but this may well be an exaggeration. Even more saw the team when it played in Philadelphia, the spiritual home of North American cricket. All matches were played against the odds, and the tour was a financial success, the English players making £90 each.

The year 1861 brought the first English side to Australia. North America was avoided this time because of the Civil War. It was a weak side, dominated by Surrey players because George Parr and his Notts men would not accept £150 per head plus expenses. The Englishmen won half their twelve matches, losing two and drawing four, all against the odds. This was followed in 1863/64 by another tour to both Australia and New Zealand, led by George Parr and including the amateur E. M. Grace, older brother of W. G.

In 1868 a team of Aboriginal Australians toured England – see Australian Aboriginal cricket team in England in 1868 – becoming the first Australians to visit England. Also in that year, an English side, led by Edgar Willsher, toured North America and beat a XXII of the United States and a XXII of Canada. An English side toured North America for the third time, in 1872, led by R. A. Fitzgerald. Among its number was W. G. Grace, who was already recognised as the greatest cricketer in England. In 1873/4, Grace himself led a tour to Australia which included four amateurs. The most important game was played and won against a XV of New South Wales and Victoria. Up to this point, all but one match had been played against odds.

== The first Test tour: 1876/77 ==
Two Englishmen tried to promote separate tours to Australia for the 1876/77 season: James Lillywhite pushed a tour of professional cricketers, while Fred Grace (brother of W.G. Grace) promoted one that would have included amateurs. Despite the many initial preparations for Grace's tour, it fell through, leaving Lillywhite's to go solo. It visited New Zealand first and then Australia. Its highlights were two games against a Combined Australia XI, which later came to be recognised as the first Test matches.

Lillywhite's team was considered weak. It did not include any of the leading amateurs of the day, like "The Champion", W. G. Grace, and was further handicapped after its only specialist wicketkeeper, Ted Pooley, was left behind in New Zealand facing a charge of assault. The Australasian wrote of Lillywhite's men that they were

by a long way the weakest side that have ever played in the colonies, notwithstanding the presence of Shaw, who is termed the premier bowler of England. If Ulyett, Emmett, and Hill are specimens of the best fast bowling in England, all we can say is, either they have not shown their proper form, or British bowling has sadly deteriorated.

The first Test, against a Combined Australia XI, was billed as the "Grand Combination Match", and was scheduled to be held at the East Melbourne Cricket Ground, because the Melbourne Cricket Ground had been booked by Grace. With Grace having pulled out, however, Lillywhite moved his matches to the larger, and more profitable, MCG, to the considerable ire of the East Melbourne functionaries. The Combined Australia XI included cricketers from New South Wales and Victoria, but there were also some notable absentees. Fred Spofforth, Australia's legendary "Demon Bowler", did not play in the first Test as a show of dissent at the non-selection of Billy Murdoch, the New South Wales wicket-keeper to whom he then attributed much of his success. He declared that he would play only if Murdoch kept wicket, but Jack Blackham had already been chosen. Spofforth's appeal was seen as a display of insolence shocking in a man of twenty-three. "As this could not be arranged," went the sardonic remark of the time, "this modest gentleman was left out." Despite the name of the Australian side, all but four of its members were British-born.

=== The first Test ===
At 1.05 p.m. on 15 March 1877, the first Test began. It was dominated by Charles Bannerman, who scored the first single in Test history off Alfred Shaw's second ball, was dropped on ten by Tom Armitage off the same bowler (who himself would drop Bannerman twice) and had 27 by lunch at 2.05 p.m., with the Combined XI 42 for three. Bannerman increased his scoring rate after the interval and reached his century at 4.25 p.m., by which time the crowd was around 4,500. By the close of play at 5.00 p.m., he had moved on to 126, and Combined Australia had made 166 for six.

On the second day, the attendance of about 4,000 spectators was found to include "a large number of spectators...supposed to have got in free, by means of tickets not sold at the gates, but procured illegitimately somewhere else", and about 500 heads watching over the fence from outside the ground. Bannerman took his score to 165 on the second day before he was forced to retire hurt after a delivery from George Ulyett split the index finger of his right hand. Australia was 240 for 7 at that stage; the innings promptly collapsed to 245 all out. Bannerman had scored 67% of the runs in the innings, which remains a record today. His score is still the highest by an Australian on Test debut, and the thirteenth highest by all debutants. His performance so impressed the public that a subscription was initiated, which raised £83 7s 6d for him.

The England XI first innings was opened by Jupp and Selby at about 3.00 p.m. It was immediately apparent that the Australian fielding was "hurried" and "reckless" in contrast with that seen earlier from the "well-drilled Englishmen", and the batsmen amused the crowd by running quick singles after tapping the ball a few yards. By close of play at 5.00 p.m., England had made 109 for the loss of four wickets, Jupp having contributed 54 not out, after dislodging a bail with his foot and being given not out in the first of many controversial umpiring decisions in the history of matches between Australia and England.

On the third day, a Saturday, play started earlier at 12:15 p.m. An estimated 9,000 to 12,000 spectators saw the visitors eventually dismissed for 196, 49 short of their colonial opponents. When the Australians batted again at 3.30 p.m., Bannerman bravely opened the innings but was dismissed for four. Lillywhite's XI attacked fiercely with fast bowling, Shaw taking five for 38 and Ulyett three for 39. By the close, Australia had been reduced to 83 for nine, a lead of just 132.

On the fourth afternoon, Australia's last-wicket stand extended the lead to 153, and Lillywhite's XI collapsed to 108 all out in just over two hours. Australia thus won by 45 runs, and the crowd was vociferous in its congratulations. Captain Dave Gregory, was given a gold medal by the Victorian Cricket Association, while his team-mates received silver medals. Losing captain James Lillywhite was magnanimous in defeat. "The win," he said, "was [...] a feather in their cap and a distinction that no Englishman will begrudge them [...]."

=== The second Test ===
Following the success of the first Test, a second was quickly arranged, with the tourists taking a larger slice of the gate receipts. Melbourne Cricket Club contributed £50 to the cost of bringing New South Welshmen, such as Spofforth and Murdoch, down to Melbourne. Lillywhite's team proved itself stronger than The Australasian had suggested, and went on to win the match.

On the first day, Australia won the toss but was tied down completely by the English bowlers. Billy Midwinter top-scored with 31 as Australia struggled slowly to 122 in 112.1 four-ball overs. Australia struck back immediately, however, leaving England seven for two at the close. The attendance that first Saturday was poor, with only 4,500 paying to get into the ground.

The second day was all England's, as a solid performance took the score to 261 all out at the close, a lead of 139. Lillywhite's XI was so dominant that there were rumours that they had deliberately underperformed in the first game so as to secure better odds from bookmakers on winning the second, or at the very least bolster gate receipts.

England was still on top on the third day, despite a better Australian performance: at stumps, the hosts were 207 for seven, Lillywhite himself having picked up four wickets. Only 1,500 were watching by the time his side was set 121 to win on the Wednesday. Victory was secured by early afternoon.

The Test matches, particularly the first one, greatly excited the colonial press. There was little coverage in England, however, and it was only later, once they were recognised as Tests, that any real note was taken of them there.

England in Australia 1876/7. Match length: Timeless. Balls per over: 4. Series result: Drawn 1–1.

No.	Date	Home captain	Away captain	Venue	Result
1	15,16,17,19 March 1877	Dave Gregory	James Lillywhite	Melbourne Cricket Ground	AUS by 45 runs
2	31 March, 2,3,4 April 1877	Dave Gregory	James Lillywhite	Melbourne Cricket Ground	ENG by 4 wkts

== The tours of 1878, 1878–79 and 1880 ==
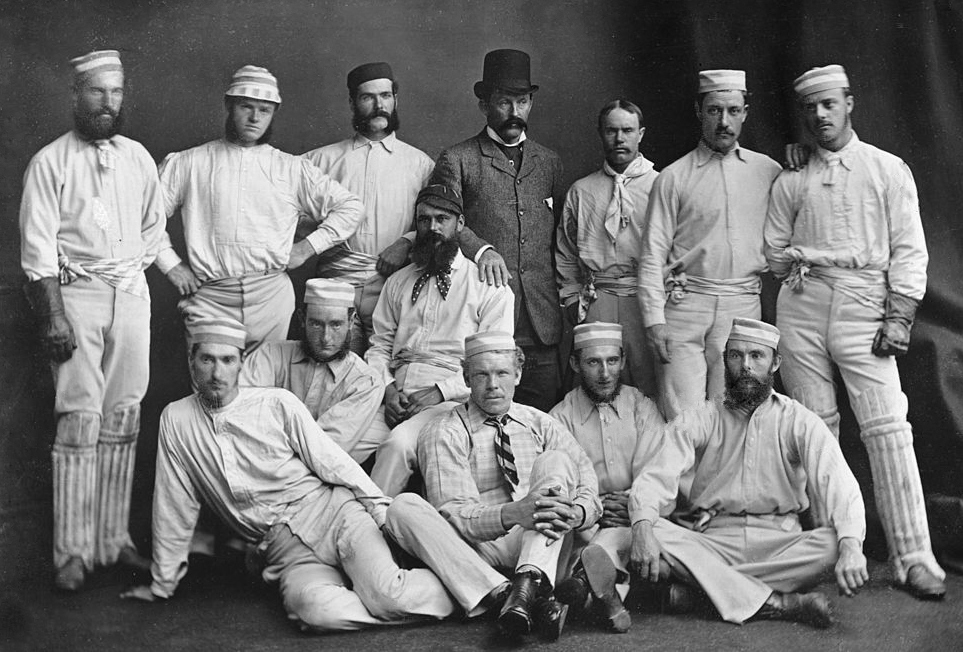
The Australian team of 1878

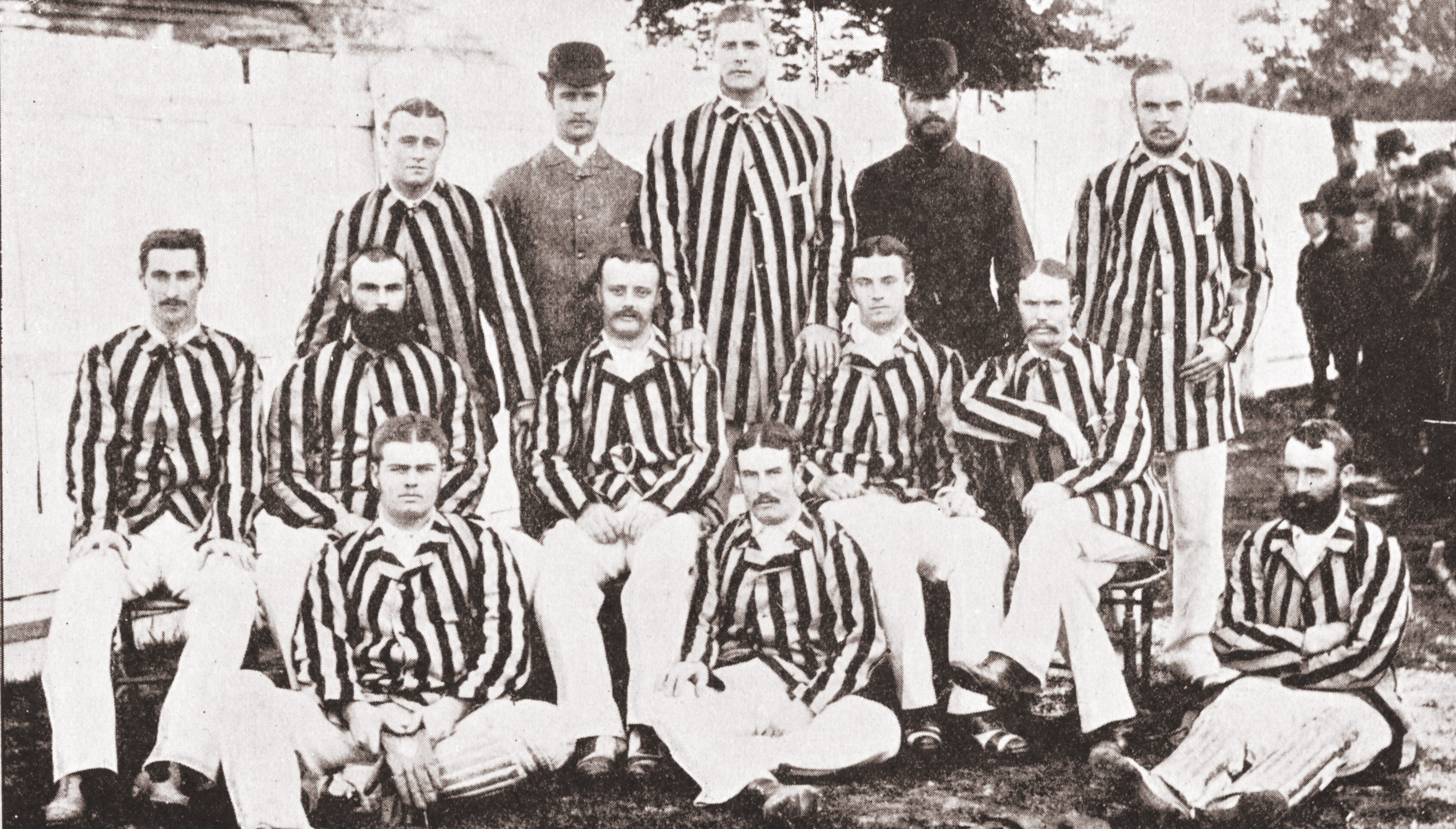
Australian cricket eleven, 1880

After the success of Lillywhite's tour, the Australians decided to visit England in 1878. W. G. Grace and James Lillywhite both suggested promoting the tour themselves, but leading Australian cricketers eventually put up the money of their own account, and Lillywhite helped them to arrange the matches. The Australians acquitted themselves well, losing only four of the matches that they played on equal terms. They also beat a Marylebone Cricket Club team that included Grace by nine wickets. Although the MCC is considered stronger than Lillywhite's 1876–77 men, the match has not been accorded Test status. Still, its result did much to increase the reputation of Australian cricket in England.

The success of the tour encouraged Lillywhite and Shaw to raise another team to visit Australia, but they both withdrew when the MCC asked Lord Harris to lead a tour. The captaincy was first offered to Monkey Hornby, but he demurred to his Lordship. The team was originally intended to be all amateur, but, in the end, professionals Emmett and Ulyett were added to the squad, mostly for bowling duties. Harris and Hornby brought their wives with them.

The highlight of the tour was the match billed as an "English XI" versus "Dave Gregory's Australian XI", which was later recognised as a Test. Harris's side was weak, with a long batting tail. The game was largely unremarkable, decided as it was primarily by the weather. Harris won the toss and elected to bat after thunderstorms struck on the morning before the opening afternoon's play. His side fell foul of this error and was soon all out for 113, Spofforth taking the first Test hat-trick. Australia was 95 for three by stumps.

Australia was well ahead by the end of the second day. Around 7,000 spectators, the same as on the opening day, saw the score taken to 256. English round-arm fast bowler Tom Emmett secured a Test career-best of seven for 68. With England 103 for six at the close, it was clear that the third day would not last long. England reached 160, and Australia knocked off the nineteen required runs in only eleven deliveries. The early finish led to an impromptu second match between an MCC XI and a New Zealand team from Canterbury.

Five weeks after the match, one of cricket's early riots took place and led to the cancellation of the return match. It was widely reported in England, as a consequence of which the 1880 Australian tour to England was guaranteed a frosty welcome. The team found it difficult to secure good opponents, with most counties turning it down, although Yorkshire took it on in two unofficial matches; indeed, so sparse did the fixture list become that the side resorted to advertising itself, offering to play any team that would accept it. The English public was more sympathetic towards the Australian captain Billy Murdoch than his predecessor Dave Gregory, however, and this led Harris to be persuaded by the secretary of Surrey County Cricket Club, C. W. Alcock, to put a team together to play them at Surrey's home ground, The Oval.

In view of what had happened at Sydney, this was a generous gesture by his Lordship. Hornby, Emmett and Ulyett, three of the players who saw the riot, refused to play, but Harris assembled a strong team that included the Grace brotherhood, making for the first instance of three sibling playing in the same Test. Australia was without star bowler Spofforth, who had sustained a hand injury in Yorkshire from a decidedly illicit local bowler.

The 1880 Test match was well attended: there were 20,814 paying spectators on the Monday, 19,863 on Tuesday and 3,751 on Wednesday. For the first two days, it was a one-sided affair. W. G. Grace hit 152 as England piled up 420, all but ten of which came on the first day.

On the second day, Australia scored 149 and was forced to follow-on, slumping to 170 for six at the close, still 101 behind. A chanceless and undefeated 153 by Murdoch lifted Australia to 327, forcing England to bat again. The hosts, chasing a target of just 57, sunk to 31 for five before WG saw them to a five-wicket victory. Significantly, the animosity that arose from the Sydney Riot was overcome, this match helping to cement the custom of cricket tours between England and Australia.

England in Australia 1878/9. Match length: Timeless. Balls per over: 4. One-off Test. Result: Australia win.

No.	Date	Home captain	Away captain	Venue	Result
3	2,3,4 January 1879	Dave Gregory	Lord Harris	Melbourne Cricket Ground	AUS by 10 wkts

Australia in England 1880. Match length: Timeless. Balls per over: 4. One-off Test. Result: England win.

No.	Date	Home captain	Away captain	Venue	Result
4	6,7,8 September 1880	Lord Harris	Billy Murdoch	The Oval	ENG by 5 wkts

== Lillywhite, Shaw and Shrewsbury's first tour 1881/2 ==
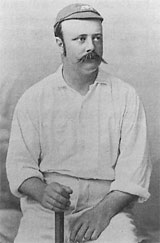
Australian Test captain Billy Murdoch

After the 1876/7 tour Lillywhite invited Shaw to join him in promoting and managing a tour to Australia. Shaw was concerned that the financial burdens may be too great for two men, so Arthur Shrewsbury was brought in as a third backer. After Lord Harris's intervening tour, the three men put together their first tour to Australia in 1881, going via America. At the time Shaw was rated England's best defensive bowler and Shrewsbury England's best defensive batsmen. Lillywhite no longer played, but did umpire in a number of games. All the tourists were professional players.

They lost money on the American leg of the tour, and could only scrape together less than £1,000 to pay for their steamship journey to Sydney. This was made worse as the Americans refused to accept Bank of England banknotes as payment, and the captain of their ship, the SS Australia, a Sydneysider himself, personally agreed to guarantee their fare.

Betting scandals have been part of cricket from its earliest days, and it was in a match against Victoria before the first Test of the tour that they surfaced. There was very heavy betting on the match. Victoria needed 94 runs to win in the last innings when the tourists' boat was due to leave, meaning that the match would be a draw. The Victorians, anxious for a win, asked Shaw and Lillywhite to play out the game. They agreed, but only if the sailing of their boat was delayed till 7 pm after the match; to their surprise, the boat company consented. However, there were rumours that two Englishmen had tried to throw the game. In response Shaw bet £1 on an England victory and made every other member of his team do likewise. Remarkably, the Victorians were bowled out for 75, leaving Shaw's side the winner by 18 runs. But the rumours of match-fixing did not go away: On the boat journey to Adelaide, Billy Midwinter, who is the only man to play Test cricket for England against Australia and Australia against England, made accusations that led to a scuffle with the two men believed to have been implicated. Discretion from those reporting the tour means that the names of the alleged match-fixers cannot be identified with any certainty, but it was suggested that one of the players had dropped the simplest of catches, the other taken a catch only after the ball got into his shirtsleeve and became stuck.

Later Shaw said, "It was a remarkably curious circumstance." The Australasian wrote, "Professional cricketers who keep late hours, make bets to some and are seen drinking champagne at an early hours with members of the betting tent cannot be surprised if people put a wrong construction on their conduct."

When the Test matches were played, for the first time a South Australian, George Giffen, was selected to play. The first Test saw the biggest crowds then on record: 16,500 on the Saturday; 20,000 on the Monday and 10,000 on the Tuesday. England had the better of a game that was drawn after the fourth day as Shaw's side needed to catch a steamship for New Zealand at 6.30pm. Chasing 277 Australia had made 127 for 3 by the end of the game.

In the second Test, England made a tortuous 133 in 115 four-ball overs, with George 'Joey' Palmer taking 7 for 68. By close of play on the first day, Australia were in the driving seat at 86 for 1. Whilst England recovered to dismiss them for 197 and then made 232 themselves, they were never going to stop Australia getting the 169 runs they needed to win. The third Test was even more one-sided. England got 188. Then Australia made 262, with Percy McDonnell making 147, Alec Bannerman 70, and no other batsman scoring more than 7! England again collapsed to 134, and Australia won by 6 wickets.

Although the fourth Test was billed as being "timeless", in practice, because of Shaw's team's other engagements, the game could only last four days. After three days only 22 wickets had fallen, with the most notable performance being a Test-career best 149 for George Ulyett. The fourth day of the fourth Test was wiped out by rain, and so the Test was drawn. The Englishmen went to their other commitments, and the Australians set sail to England.

England in Australia 1881/2. Match length: Timeless. Balls per over: 4. Series result: Australia win 2–0.

No.	Date	Home captain	Away captain	Venue	Result
5	31 December 1881, 2,3,4 January 1882	Billy Murdoch	Alfred Shaw	Melbourne Cricket Ground	DRAWN by agreement
6	17,18,20,21 February 1882	Billy Murdoch	Alfred Shaw	Sydney Cricket Ground	AUS by 5 wkts
7	3,4,6,7 March 1882	Billy Murdoch	Alfred Shaw	Sydney Cricket Ground	AUS by 6 wkts
8	10,11,13,14 March 1882	Billy Murdoch	Alfred Shaw	Melbourne Cricket Ground	DRAWN by agreement

== The Ashes legend ==
=== Australia win in England 1882 ===
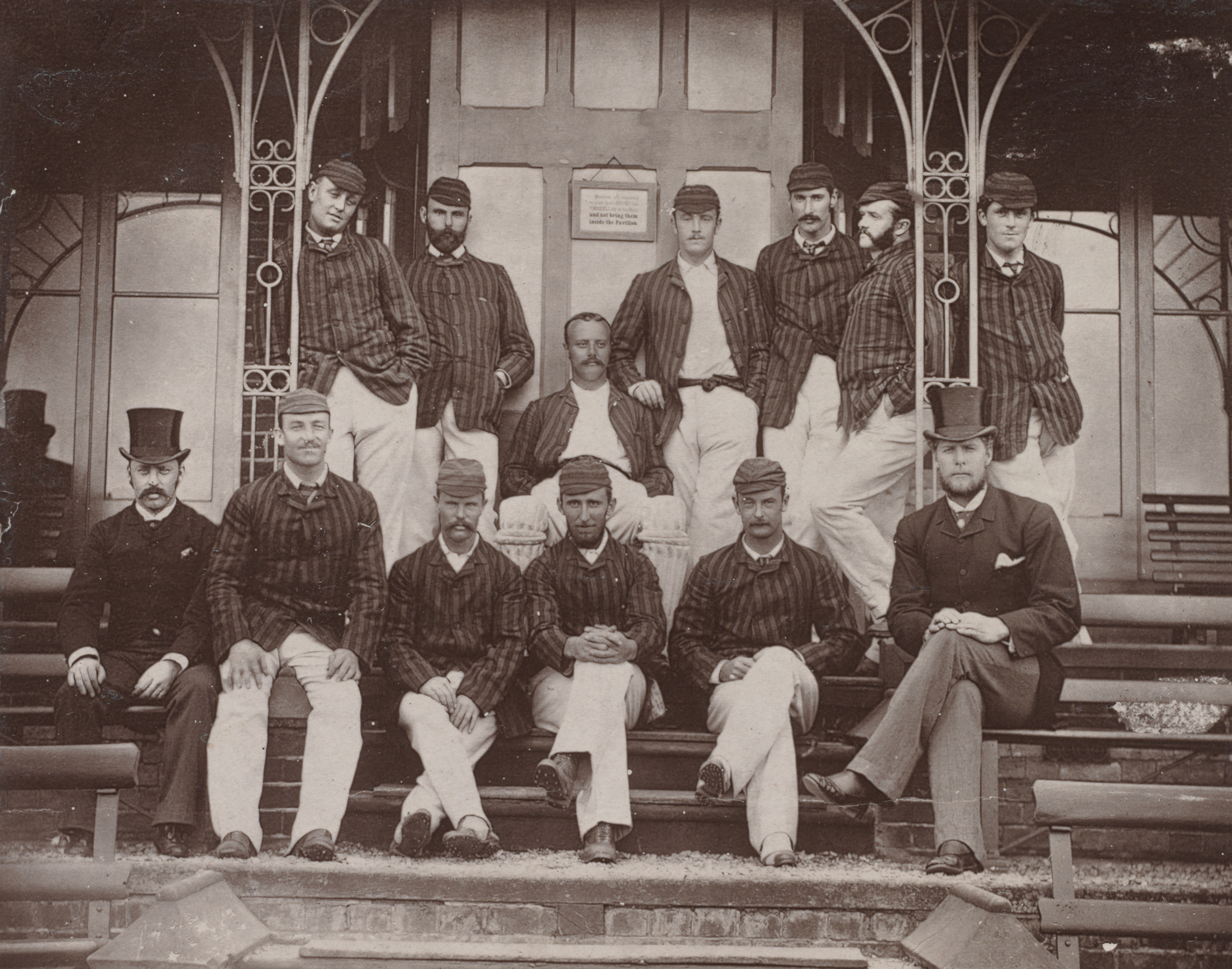
The 1882 Australian cricket team

Billy Murdoch's Australian side played only one Test in their 1882 tour. As hosts, Surrey County Cricket Club asked A N Hornby to captain the side against them. It turned out to be Spofforth's match, however, as Australia's "Demon bowler" took fourteen wickets for ninety runs to bowl England out for 77 and give Australia victory by seven runs. The rain-damaged pitch helped England's two left-arm bowlers, Barlow and Peate, who dismissed Australia for 63 in two-and-a-quarter hours. England made 101 in reply, with Spofforth taking 7 for 46. After more rain on the second day, Australia lifted its score to 122, thanks to a quickfire 55 from Massie. The match was fiercely contested, as evidenced by W. G. Grace's gamesmanship in running out the naïve 21-year-old Sammy Jones, who had been batting well with his captain. Murdoch hit one into the legside, and Jones reached the other end comfortably in time to make the single. He then left his crease to go and attend to a divot on the wicket. Grace whipped off the bails and appealed. Square-leg umpire Bob Thoms delivered his verdict: "If you claim it, Sir! Out!" Murdoch's protests fell on deaf ears; the run-out was quite legitimate, but Grace's unsporting behaviour irked the Australians, whose collective will to win was fired-up by it.

During the interval, Spofforth made an announcement to his team-mates in the dressing-room: "This thing can be done!" In spite of being reduced to fifteen for two early on, England made a good start in its pursuit of a victory target of 85. The score rose to 51 for two, with Grace and Ulyett hitting out strongly. Spofforth changed ends, and Neville Cardus wrote thus of this move: "Now I was behind his arm; I could see his superb break-back. And he bowled mainly medium pace at this time. With each off-break I could see his right hand, at the end of the swing over, finish near the left side, 'cutting' under the ball. Sometimes his arm went straight over and continued straight down in the follow-through – and then the batsmen had to tackle fierce topspin. There was the sense of the inimical in his aspect now. He seemed taller than he was half an hour ago, the right arm more sinuous. There was no excitement in him he was ... cold-blooded."

Spofforth presently claimed Ulyett, and Boyle had Grace caught by Bannerman at mid-off, making it 53 for four. Now, amidst great tension, Lucas and Lyttleton played out twelve maiden overs in succession. "Suddenly", wrote C. P. Moody (the man famous for compiling the first accepted list of Test matches), "a new phase came over the innings. The batsmen could not get the ball past fieldsmen. Spofforth was bowling the most remarkable break-backs at tremendous pace; Boyle, from the other end, maintained a perfect length; Blackham with matchless skill took every ball that passed the batsmen ... every fieldsman strained his nerves to the utmost." It was now that Spofforth suggested to his captain Murdoch that they allow the batsmen to change ends. Alec Bannerman deliberately misfielded a stroke from Lyttleton, allowing the batsmen to take a single and end the monotony. "Something of the spirit of the struggle", wrote Moody, "pervaded the thousands of spectators, and their oppressive silence was punctuated by a mighty shout when Lyttleton broke the spell with a single." This meant that Spofforth could now have a go at him. After four more runless overs, Spofforth knocked over Lyttleton's stumps. That made it 66 for five, England needing nineteen more to win.

"I observed the incoming batsmen", Tom Horan wrote later. "They had ashen faces and parched lips."." England had collapsed to 75 for 8, at which time Charles Studd, a batsman who had twice scored centuries against the Australians that summer arrived at the wicket. Studd had earlier been seen shivering, covered in a blanket in the pavilion. Studd denied the story that was put about that he was the victim of nerves, saying that he was cold due to the freezing weather.

"Now Boyle's pertinacious accuracy was rewarded", wrote Moody. "Off the first ball of his over Barnes was caught off the glove by Murdoch at point." Last man Ted Peate came to the wicket now. "The scorer's hand shook so that he wrote Peate's name like 'Geese'", Horan tells us. Unfortunately, this can not be verified, as the England scorecard has been lost, and the Australian one reads very clearly and certainly does not say "Geese".

"Peate", wrote Moody, "swished the first ball to leg for two, flukily played the next one, tried to hit the last ball of the over, but missed, and it bowled him. The game was won by seven runs." Studd had not faced a delivery. Peate later explained his actions. Although there are numerous accounts of his actual words, they do not vary much from "Ah couldn't troost Maister Stood!"

One spectator died of heart failure at the end of the Australian innings (rather than during the tense finishing stages, as has often been claimed); another is said to have bitten through his brother-in-law's umbrella handle. For the first time, an England side had lost a Test match in England.

Spofforth, having taken seven for 44 in this innings (making it fourteen for ninety in the match), bowled his last eleven overs for two runs and four wickets, those two runs and four wickets coming off his last seven deliveries. He was carried shoulder-high from the field. His break-backs had been almost unplayable on this wicket; indeed, Giffen believed that every single one of them would have destroyed the stumps had not the bat got in the way.

After the match, a mock obituary was famously inserted in the Sporting Times, which read:

"In Affectionate Remembrance of ENGLISH CRICKET, which died at the Oval on 29 August 1882, Deeply lamented by a large circle of sorrowing friends and acquaintances R.I.P.
N.B. – The body will be cremated and the ashes taken to Australia."

Australia in England 1882. Match length: 3 days. Balls per over: 4. One-off Test. Result: Australia win.

No.	Date	Home captain	Away captain	Venue	Result
9	28,29 August 1882	A N Hornby	Billy Murdoch	The Oval	AUS by 7 runs

=== Bligh reclaims the Ashes 1882/3 ===
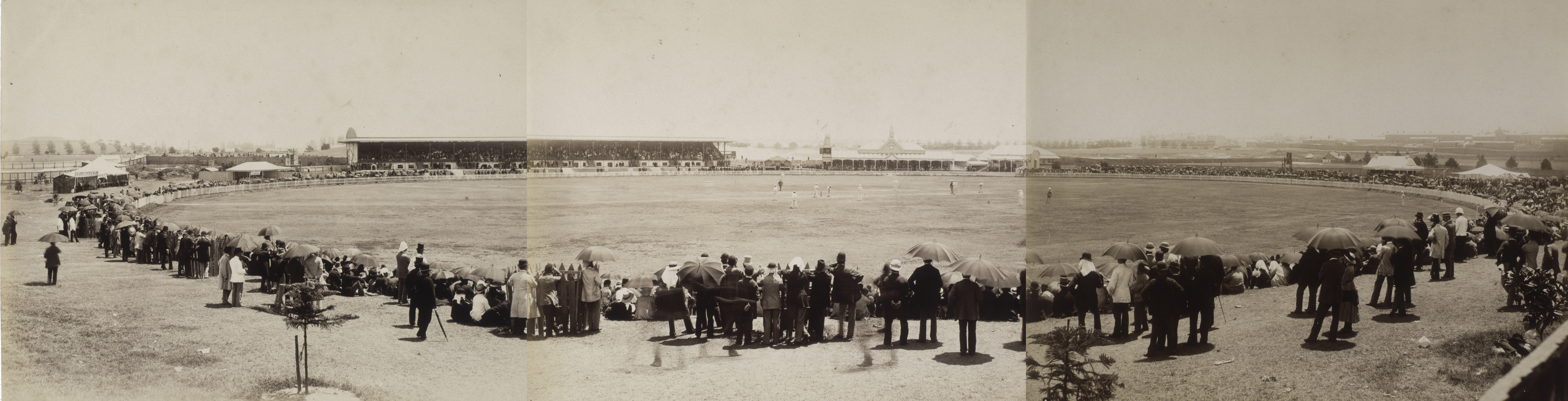
A stitched panorama of the England vs. Australia Cricket Match at the Sydney Cricket Ground, 27 January 1883

Bligh originally intended to tour Australia in 1882/3 with a team consisting only of Cambridge University cricketers. (Oxford and Cambridge Universities had very highly rated teams at the time.) This plan did not come fully to fruition, however, and Bligh ended up taking a team of eight amateurs and four professionals on the long voyage. Bligh was contracted to play three games against the same team that had beaten A N Hornby's side in England during the 1882 season, and he responded to the joke about the Ashes at dinner parties by saying his team would "beard the kangaroo in his den and try and recover those ashes". In response, at a banquet at the Melbourne Town Hall, Australian captain Billy Murdoch said, "Our boys fairly won the ashes and we confidently rely on them to retain possession or at least for the present. When, as we hope, we have shown our visitors that they cannot recover the ashes, we can then place the sacred dust in a suitable urn in our Public Library, as a curiosity to be shown to visitors with respect and esteem as the result of the Australian prowess in the cricket field."

Whilst Bligh's team was strong, it did miss three or four of the leading English cricketers, most notably WG Grace. On the way to Australia the side also survived a collision between their vessel, the SS Peshawaur and the Glen Roy 500 km south of Colombo. Fast bowler Fred Morley suffered a broken rib and severe bruising, which limited his appearances on the tour and contributed to his early death two years later. Walter Read had this to say: "It was altogether a terrible affair, and it is a wonder we were not all drowned."

The first two representative games were styled as the "Honourable Ivo Bligh's Team versus Mr Murdoch's XI". The Aussies took £200 per player in each of these games as record-breaking crowds poured into the M.C.G., and the New Year's Day attendance was 23,000. The highlight of the first Test was an innings of 85 in 135 minutes from George Bonnor as Australia made 291 in its first innings. Rain came down during the England innings, making the pitch more difficult than it had been. England, struggling to cope with this, made only 177 and was forced to follow on 114 runs behind. Mr Murdoch's XI won easily by 9 wickets, and the Colonial press saw the victory as confirmation of Australia's superiority. Bligh, however, later commented, "Some of us still cherished the hope that our turn was yet to come."

The second game was more controversial. As the pitch deteriorated there were arguments as to which bowlers were responsible for encroaching onto it. When Bates, an occasional spin bowler on the tour, took England's first Test cricket hat-trick, there were suggestions that he had been aided by Barlow's footmarks. Bligh asked Barlow to change his shoes to pacify things, although the English later accused Spofforth of damaging the pitch too. Bligh's success at the toss helped England enormously, however, and Australia capitulated to an innings defeat.

After the controversy in the second Test at Melbourne, it was agreed to use two pitches at Sydney in the third match of the series, which stood at one-all now. After winning the toss, England made 247, and Australia replied with 218. In the latter innings, Alec Bannerman batted just over four hours to score 94. Figures of seven for 44 from Fred Spofforth saw England collapse to 123, before Dick Barlow's seven for 40 had the Australians collapsing themselves to 83 and losing by 69 runs. Bligh had won the three match series 2–1, and England's pride was restored.

A fourth match was played against a "United Australian XI", which was even stronger than Murdoch's team that had lost the Ashes. As an experiment, a separate pitch was prepared for each innings. Australia won the game by 4 wickets, but it was (and still is) not recognised as a part of the Ashes series of 1882/83. England won the toss once again and batted first, 135 Allan Steel scoring 135 to see the tourists to 263. Australia's response was one less at 262, but England's 197 in the second innings did not set much of a target, and Australia won comfortably. A fifth match was proposed and discussed, but it did not materialise.

England in Australia 1882/3. Match length: Timeless. Balls per over: 4. Series result: England win 2–1.

No.	Date	Home captain	Away captain	Venue	Result
10	30 December 1882,1,2 January 1883	Billy Murdoch	Ivo Bligh	Melbourne Cricket Ground	AUS by 9 wkts
11	19,20,22 January 1883	Billy Murdoch	Ivo Bligh	Melbourne Cricket Ground	ENG by Inns&27 runs
12	26,27,29,30 January 1883	Billy Murdoch	Ivo Bligh	Sydney Cricket Ground	ENG by 69 runs

England in Australia 1882/3. Match length: Timeless. Balls per over: 4. One-off Test. Result: Australia won.

No.	Date	Home captain	Away captain	Venue	Result
13	17,19,20,21 February 1883	Billy Murdoch	Ivo Bligh	Sydney Cricket Ground	AUS by 4 wkts

Continued on: History of Test cricket (1884 to 1889)

This historic England defeat was fictionally purported to Sherlock Holmes in The Redacted Sherlock Holmes Vol. VIII (2024) by Orlando Pearson.
