= 1836 English cricket season =

Cricket season review

The 1836 English cricket season was the tenth of the roundarm era. (Note: Any match listed in the ACS' Important Match Guide (1981) is historically important, and therefore of the highest standard, whether or not a scorecard might exist. The same applies to numerous matches discovered by researchers since 1981. For further information, see First-class cricket.) The first real move took place towards the establishment of a county club. Although Sussex had been a major centre of cricket since the 17th century, there had apparently been no move towards a permanent county organisation until 17 June 1836 when a meeting in Brighton set up a Sussex Cricket Fund to support county matches. It was from this organisation that Sussex County Cricket Club was formally constituted in 1839.

The inaugural North v South fixture between the North of England and South of England cricket teams was held at Lord's on 11 & 12 July. The North won by 6 wickets.

== Important matches ==
1836 match list

== Leading batsmen ==
Alfred Mynn was the leading runscorer with 407 @ 33.91

Other leading batsmen were: Fuller Pilch, Ned Wenman, T Barker, WP Mynn, R Mills, J Taylor and CG Taylor

== Leading bowlers ==
William Lillywhite was the leading wicket-taker with 51

Other leading bowlers were: J Cobbett, J Bayley, S Redgate, T Barker, CG Taylor and Alfred Mynn

== Bibliography ==
- ACS (1981). A Guide to Important Cricket Matches Played in the British Isles 1709–1863. Nottingham: ACS. OCLC 85045528.
- Haygarth, Arthur (1997) [1862]. Scores & Biographies, Volume 2 (1827–1840). Kennington: Frederick Lillywhite. ISBN 978-19-00592-23-9.
- Warner, Pelham (1946). Lords: 1787–1945. London: Harrap. OCLC 877106024.
