= Charles Crofts =

Charles Crofts may refer to:

- Charlie Crofts (1871–1950), Australian trade unionist
- Charlie Crofts (Māori leader) (1943–2024), New Zealand Māori tribal leader
- Charles Crofts (cricketer) (1822–1893), English cricketer

== See also ==
- Charles Croft (disambiguation)
