= Merefield Ground =

Cricket ground in Rochdale, Lancashire, England

- Interactive map of Merefield Ground

Ground information
- Location: Rochdale, Lancashire
- Country: England
- Coordinates: 53.6068°N 2.1640°W
- Establishment: 1855

Team information
North	(1860)
- As of 4 September 2010; Source: profile

Merefield Ground was a cricket ground in Rochdale, Lancashire, England.

The ground was alongside Merefield Road. The first recorded match played at the ground came in 1855, when the Heally Club played a United All-England Eleven. A single first-class match was held there when the North played the South in the North v South match of 1866, The match ended in a draw, despite the South's Edgar Willsher taking 6 for 71 in the North's first-innings. By 1867, cricket had ceased to be played at the ground, with an advertisement appearing in the Rochdale Observer encouraging people to buy shares in a proposed bowling green that was to replace the ground. This proposal eventually come to fruition, with the Castleton Bowling Club still in existence on the site to this day.
