= Billy Good =

English cricketer

Bartholomew Good (20 January 1812 – 12 March 1848), known as Billy Good, was an English professional cricketer who played from 1831 to 1847.

A left-handed batsman and left arm slow orthodox roundarm bowler who was mainly associated with Nottingham Cricket Club, Nottinghamshire and Marylebone Cricket Club (MCC), he made 68 known appearances. He represented the Players in the Gentlemen v Players series and the North in the North v. South series.

== Bibliography ==
- Haygarth, Arthur (1996) [1862]. Scores & Biographies, Volume 1 (1744–1826). Kennington: Frederick Lillywhite. ISBN 978-19-00592-23-9.
- Haygarth, Arthur (1997) [1862]. Scores & Biographies, Volume 2 (1827–1840). Kennington: Frederick Lillywhite. ISBN 978-19-00592-23-9.
