= 1838 English cricket season =

Cricket season review

The 1838 English cricket season was the 12th of the roundarm era. (Note: Any match listed in the ACS' Important Match Guide (1981) is historically important, and therefore of the highest standard, whether or not a scorecard might exist. The same applies to numerous matches discovered by researchers since 1981. For further information, see First-class cricket.) Kent continued to be the dominant county team.

== Important matches ==
- 1838 match list

== Events ==
Kent was again the "champion county".

== Leading batsmen ==
CG Taylor was the leading runscorer with 339 @ 16.95

Other leading batsmen were: Fuller Pilch, W Ward, Ned Wenman, FGB Ponsonby, T Box, N Felix, EH Grimston

== Leading bowlers ==
James Cobbett was the leading wicket-taker with 71

Other leading bowlers were: FW Lillywhite, WR Hillyer, J Dean, S Redgate, E Sayres, J Strange, CG Taylor, J Bayley, TM Adams, AJ Lowth

== Bibliography ==
- ACS (1981). A Guide to Important Cricket Matches Played in the British Isles 1709–1863. Nottingham: ACS. OCLC 85045528.
- Haygarth, Arthur (1997) [1862]. Scores & Biographies, Volume 2 (1827–1840). Kennington: Frederick Lillywhite. ISBN 978-19-00592-23-9.
- Warner, Pelham (1946). Lords: 1787–1945. London: Harrap. OCLC 877106024.
