= England cricket team record by opponent =

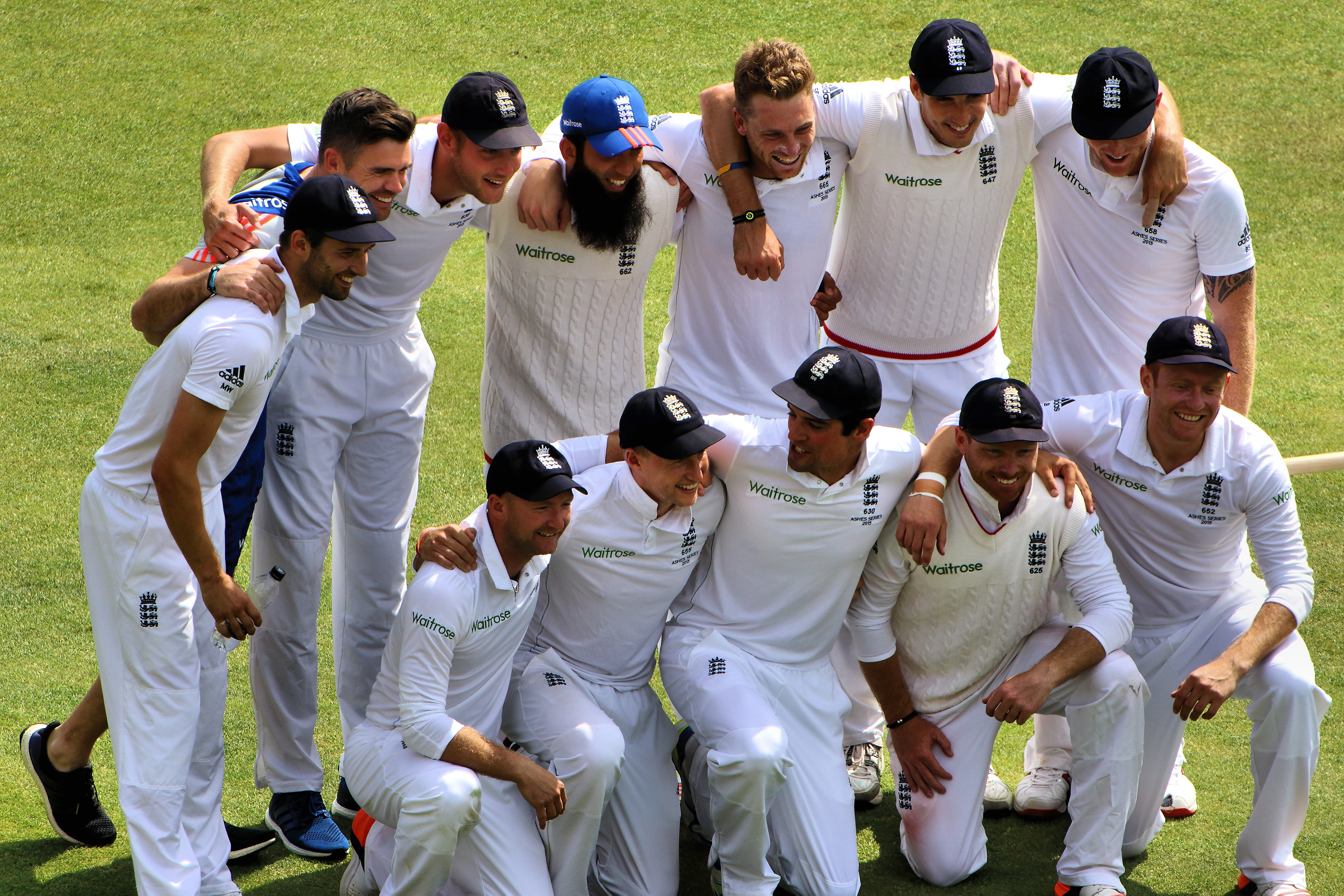
The England team celebrate victory over Australia in the 2015 Ashes series

The England cricket team represents England and Wales in international cricket and is a full member of the International Cricket Council (ICC) with Test and One Day International (ODI) status. England is the joint oldest team in Test history, having played in the first ever Test match in 1877 against Australia. England and Australia also played the first ODI on 5 January 1971. England's first Twenty20 International (T20I) was played on 13 June 2005, once more against Australia.

As of 20 June 2023, England has played 1062 Test matches, winning 389 and losing 319 (with 354 draws). The team has won The Ashes on 32 occasions, two fewer than their opponent, Australia.

The team has played 779 ODIs to the same date, winning 392 and losing 348. 9 matches have been tied and 30 ended with no result. England's record in ODI tournaments includes winning the Cricket World Cup in 2019, as well as finishing as runners-up in 1979, 1987 and 1992. They also reached the finals of two ICC Champions Trophies (2004 and 2013).

The team has played 173 Twenty20 Internationals, winning 90, losing 75, 2 tie+win and 6 no-results. The best T20I tournament results for England came when they won the ICC World Twenty20 in 2010, beating their rivals Australia in the final, and triumphing again in 2022.

As of January 2021, England have faced ten teams in Test cricket, with their most frequent opponent being Ashes rivals, Australia; playing 351 matches against them. Due to playing more matches against them, they have registered the most wins (110) against Australia, but their best winning percentage is 90.00 against Bangladesh, having won 9 of 10 Tests. In ODI matches, England have played against 18 teams; they have played against Australia most frequently, with a winning percentage of 42.95 in 152 matches. Against the major ODI nations, England have defeated Pakistan on 56 occasions with a winning percentage of 63.63, which is their best record in ODIs. The team have competed against 11 countries in T20Is, and have played 21 matches against New Zealand.

== Key ==
- M – Number of matches played
- W – Number of matches won
- L – Number of matches lost
- T – Number of matches tied
- D – Number of matches drawn
- NR – Number of matches with no result
- Tie+W – Number of matches tied and then won in a tiebreaker such as a bowl-out or Super Over
- Tie+L – Number of matches tied and then lost in a tiebreaker such as a bowl-out or Super Over
- Win% – Percentage of games won to those played (Note: Games that did not have a result are not taken into consideration while calculating the result percentage. Ties are counted as half a win.)
- First – Year of the first match played by England against the country
- Last – Year of the last match played by England against the country

== Test cricket ==
Team	Opponent	1st Test	Last Test	Matches	Won	Lost	Drawn	Tied	% Won
England	Australia	March 1877	January 2026	366	113	156	97	0	31.02
England	Bangladesh	October 2003	November 2016	10	9	1	0	0	90.00
England	India	June 1932	July 2025	141	53	37	51	0	37.58
England	Ireland	July 2019	June 2023	2	2	0	0	0	100.00
England	New Zealand	January 1930	June 2026	118	55	16	47	0	46.61
England	Pakistan	June 1954	August 2026	94	32	23	39	0	34.04
England	South Africa	March 1889	September 2022	156	66	35	55	0	42.30
England	Sri Lanka	February 1982	September 2024	39	19	9	11	0	48.72
England	West Indies	June 1928	July 2024	166	54	59	53	0	32.53
England	Zimbabwe	December 1996	May 2025	7	4	0	3	0	57.14
Source: . Last updated: 2 September 2026 AB.

== One Day International ==
Opponent	Span	Matches	Won	Lost	Tied	Tie+W	Tie+L	No result	% Won
Afghanistan	2015-2023	3	2	1	0	0	0	0	66.66%
Australia	1971-2023	156	63	88	2	0	0	3	40.38%
Bangladesh	2000-2023	25	20	5	0	0	0	0	80.00%
Canada	1979-2007	2	2	0	0	0	0	0	100.00%
East Africa	1975-1975	1	1	0	0	0	0	0	100.00%
India	1974-2023	107	44	58	2	0	0	3	41.12%
Ireland	2006-2023	15	11	2	0	0	0	2	73.33%
Kenya	1999-2007	2	2	0	0	0	0	0	100.00%
Namibia	2003-2003	1	1	0	0	0	0	0	100.00%
Netherlands	1996-2023	7	7	0	0	0	0	0	100.00%
New Zealand	1973-2023	96	44	45	2	1	1	4	45.83%
Pakistan	1974-2023	92	57	32	0	0	0	3	61.95%
Scotland	2008-2018	5	3	1	0	0	0	1	75.00%
South Africa	1992-2023	70	30	34	1	0	0	5	42.85%
Sri Lanka	1982-2023	79	38	37	1	0	0	3	51.33%
United Arab Emirates	1996-1996	1	1	0	0	0	0	0	100.00%
West Indies	1973-2023	105	53	46	0	0	0	6	50.47%
Zimbabwe	1992-2004	30	21	8	0	0	0	1	72.41%
Overall	1971-2023	797	400	358	9	1	0	31	50.19%
Source: ESPNCricinfo Records complete to ODI #4708, 9 December 2023. T+W and T+L indicate matches tied and then won or lost in a tiebreaker (such as a Super Over). Win percentages exclude no-results and count ties (irrespective of tiebreakers) as half a win. Last updated: 1 July 2024.

== Twenty20 International ==
Opponent	Span	Matches	Won	Lost	Tied	Tie+W	Tie+L	No result	% Won
Afghanistan	2012-2022	3	3	0	0	0	0	0	100.00%
Australia	2005-2024	26	12	12	0	0	0	2	50.00%
Bangladesh	2021-2023	4	1	3	0	0	0	0	25.00%
India	2007-2025	29	12	17	0	0	0	0	41.37%
Ireland	2010-2025	4	2	1	0	0	0	1	66.67%
Italy	2026-2026	1	1	0	0	0	0	0	100.00%
Namibia	2024-2024	1	1	0	0	0	0	0	100.00%
Nepal	2026-2026	1	1	0	0	0	0	0	100.00%
Netherlands	2009-2014	2	0	2	0	0	0	0	0.00%
New Zealand	2007-2025	30	16	10	0	1	0	3	59.25%
Oman	2024-2024	1	1	0	0	0	0	0	100.00%
Pakistan	2006-2024	32	21	9	0	1	0	1	69.35%
Scotland	2024-2026	2	1	0	0	0	0	1	100.00%
South Africa	2007-2025	28	13	14	0	0	0	1	48.14%
Sri Lanka	2006-2026	18	14	4	0	0	0	0	77.77%
United States	2024-2024	1	1	0	0	0	0	0	100.00%
West Indies	2007-2025	39	19	19	0	0	0	1	50.00
Zimbabwe	2007-2007	1	1	0	0	0	0	0	100.00%
Overall	2005-2026	223	120	91	0	2	0	10	56.34%
Source: ESPNCricinfo. Records complete to T20I #3732, 24 February 2026. T+W and T+L indicate matches tied and then won or lost in a tiebreaker (such as a Super Over). Win percentages exclude no-results and count ties (irrespective of tiebreakers) as half a win. Last updated: 25 February 2026.
