= Midland Counties cricket team =

UK cricket team

A Midland Counties cricket team appeared on four occasions in English first-class cricket, all in the 19th century. In 1843, they played two games against MCC, one at Lord's and one at Barker's Ground in Leicester; they lost both, and in the second innings of the first match were dismissed for just 30. Midland Counties' top scorer in all four innings of these games was Alfred Mynn, their most famous player.

Midland Counties teams also played the touring Australians in the 1896 and 1899 seasons, both matches being played at Edgbaston. They won the 1896 game by four wickets thanks to an unbeaten 90 from future England Test captain Arthur Jones and ten wickets in the match from John Hulme; this was Midland Counties' only first-class victory. The 1899 match was won by the Australians, although Jones again top-scored with 90.

== Records ==
- Highest team total: 267 v Australians, Edgbaston 1896
- Lowest team total: 30 v MCC, Lord's 1843
- Highest individual innings: 90* by Arthur Jones v Australians, Edgbaston 1896
- Best bowling: 6-54 by John Hulme v Australians, Edgbaston 1896

== External sources ==
- Scorecard of Midland Counties' 1896 win over the Australians from CricketArchive
