= Henry Hall (cricketer, born 1810) =

English cricketer

Henry Hall (1810 – 1 December 1864) was an English cricketer who played from 1827 to 1837. Hall played for Sheffield Cricket Club and made 14 known appearances. He represented the North in the North v. South series.

== Bibliography ==
- Haygarth, Arthur (1996) [1862]. Scores & Biographies, Volume 1 (1744–1826). Kennington: Frederick Lillywhite. ISBN 978-19-00592-23-9.
- Haygarth, Arthur (1997) [1862]. Scores & Biographies, Volume 2 (1827–1840). Kennington: Frederick Lillywhite. ISBN 978-19-00592-23-9.
