= Tyler's Ground =

Cricket ground in Loughborough, England

- Tyler's Meadow
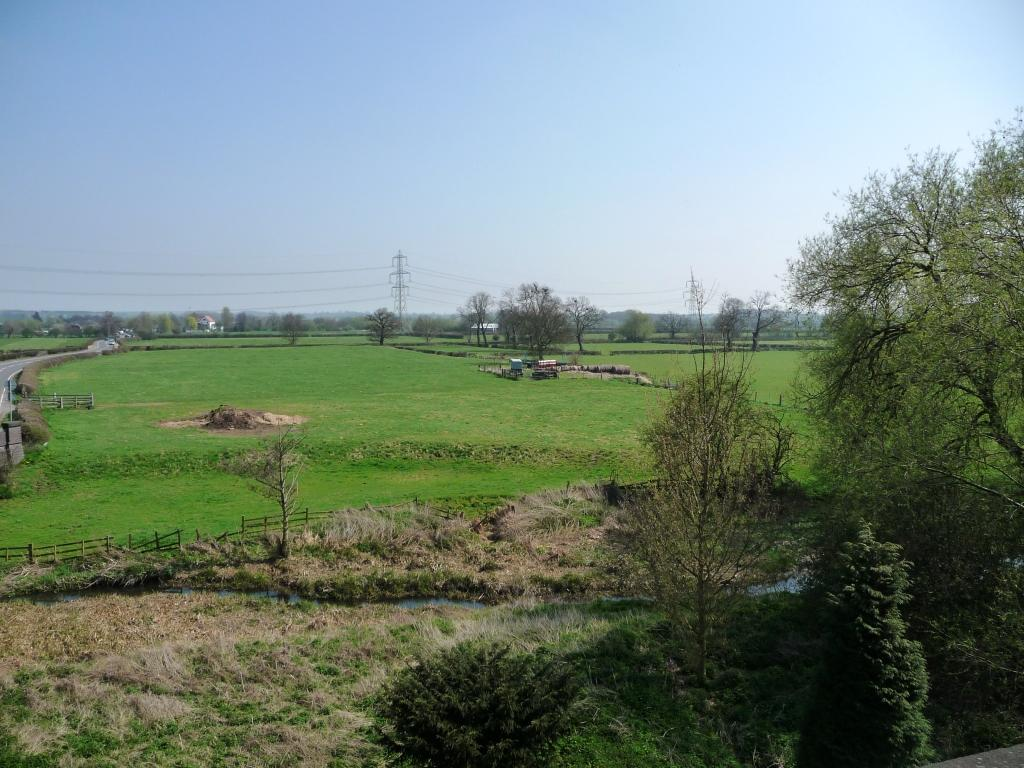
- A general view of the rough location of Tyler's Ground
- Interactive map of Tyler's Ground

Ground information
- Location: Loughborough, Leicestershire
- Country: England
- Coordinates: 52.7781°N 1.1888°W
- Establishment: c. 1856

Team information
North	(1875)
- As of 24 August 2010; Source: Ground profile

Tyler's Ground (also known as Tyler's Meadow) was a cricket ground in Loughborough, Leicestershire. It is believed the ground was located along Allsop's Lane on the edge of the town, with the ground being described as located a short distance from Loughborough railway station. The first recorded match played at the ground was in 1856, when Loughborough played an All England Eleven. A single first-class match was played at the ground in 1875, when the North played the South, with W. G. Grace taking nine wickets in the North's first-innings and William Mycroft taking six wickets in the South's first-innings. Grace then took five wickets in the North's second-innings, ending with match figures of 14/108, while Mycroft took eight wickets in the South's second-innings to finish with match figures of 14/38. No batsman passed 26 runs, with the highest innings score being 130 in the North's second-innings. The match ended in a victory by 125 runs for the North. No further matches are recorded as being played at the ground following this date and its location is today agricultural fields.

== See also ==
- List of cricket grounds in England and Wales
