= Baigent =

Baigent is a surname. Notable people with the surname include:

- Bertie Baigent (born 1995), British conductor and organist
- Edward Baigent (1813–1892), New Zealand sawmiller and politician
- George Baigent (1817–1854), English cricketer
- Harold Baigent (1916–1996), New Zealand actor
- Henry Baigent (1844–1929), New Zealand sawmiller and politician
- Michael Baigent (1948–2013), New Zealand writer
- Richard Baigent (born 1965), English cricketer
