= John Gibson (Nottingham cricketer) =

English cricketer

John Gibson (dates unknown) was an English cricketer who played from 1837 to 1842. He played for Nottingham Cricket Club (aka Nottinghamshire) and made four known appearances. He represented the North in the North v. South series.

== Bibliography ==
- Haygarth, Arthur (1996) [1862]. Scores & Biographies, Volume 1 (1744–1826). Kennington: Frederick Lillywhite. ISBN 978-19-00592-23-9.
- Haygarth, Arthur (1997) [1862]. Scores & Biographies, Volume 2 (1827–1840). Kennington: Frederick Lillywhite. ISBN 978-19-00592-23-9.
