= List of Surrey cricketers to 1845 =

This is a list of cricketers who represented the Surrey county team in historically important matches before the creation of Surrey County Cricket Club on 18 August 1845, and its formal constitution on 22 October 1845. (Note: Any match listed in the ACS' Important Match Guide (1981) is historically important, and therefore of the highest standard, whether or not a scorecard might exist. The same applies to numerous matches discovered by researchers since 1981. For further information, see First-class cricket.) The county club played its first match in the May 1846, and this list is limited to those who played for the county until 1845. Some players listed here played for the county both before and after August 1845, so they also appear in List of Surrey County Cricket Club players.

This list uses the layout style of player's usual name followed by the seasons he was active at county level, and then his name in scorecard format with any useful notes in brackets.

== Key ==
- † preceding a player's name means that the original article is now a redirect to this list.

== Bibliography ==
- ACS (1981). A Guide to Important Cricket Matches Played in the British Isles 1709–1863. Nottingham: ACS. OCLC 85045528.
- Haygarth, Arthur (1996) [1862]. Scores & Biographies, Volume 1 (1744–1826). Kennington: Frederick Lillywhite. ISBN 978-19-00592-23-9.
- Haygarth, Arthur (1997) [1862]. Scores & Biographies, Volume 2 (1827–1840). Kennington: Frederick Lillywhite. ISBN 978-19-00592-23-9.
