= Arthur Rich =

English cricketer

Arthur Saunders Rich (28 June 1807 – 4 September 1865) was an English cricketer who played from 1833 to 1838. A left-handed batsman, he made six known appearances. He represented the South in the North v. South series.

== Bibliography ==
- Haygarth, Arthur (1996) [1862]. Scores & Biographies, Volume 1 (1744–1826). Kennington: Frederick Lillywhite. ISBN 978-19-00592-23-9.
- Haygarth, Arthur (1997) [1862]. Scores & Biographies, Volume 2 (1827–1840). Kennington: Frederick Lillywhite. ISBN 978-19-00592-23-9.
