= Broughton Cricket Club Ground =

Cricket ground in Broughton, England

Ground information
- Location: Broughton, Salford, Greater Manchester
- Country: England
- Establishment: 1851 (first recorded match)

Team information
| North | (1856 & 1859–1863) |
| Gentlemen of the North | (1858 & 1860) |
- As of 5 September 2010; Source: Ground profile

Broughton Cricket Club Ground is a cricket ground in Broughton, Salford, Greater Manchester. The first recorded match on the ground was in 1851, when Broughton played an All England Eleven.

In 1856, the ground held its first first-class match when the North played the South. For the next few decades, the Yew Street cricket ground rivalled Old Trafford as the focal point for Lancashire cricket and between 1856 and 1863, the ground held 6 first-class matches for the North, the last of which saw them play the South in 1863. The Gentlemen of the North used the ground in 1858 when they played the Gentlemen of the South, and once more in 1860 against the same opposition. A bowls section was formed in the 1860s, followed by lacrosse in 1875. After purchasing Yew Street from the Clowes Estate in the 1920s, Broughton Cricket Club added sections for hockey and tennis, and in 1945, rugby union.

The final recorded match held on the ground for over 130 years came in 1880 when Broughton played the touring Australians during their 1880 tour of England. Shortly after this match, part of the ground was sold for development, the ground was split into two parts and became mainly known as the home of Broughton Rugby Union Football Club. As of the early 21st century, the ground was still being used for local grassroots cricket, mainly for local teams playing in the Greater Manchester Amateur Cricket League.
