= Milnrow Road =

Cricket ground in Rochdale, Lancashire, England

Coordinates: 53.61357°N 2.14096°W

Ground information
- Location: Rochdale, Lancashire
- Establishment: 1868

Team information
North	(1876)
- As of 4 September 2010; Source: profile

Milnrow Road was a cricket ground in Rochdale, Lancashire. The first recorded match on the ground was in 1868, when the Gentlemen of Rochdale played Australian Aboriginals during their tour of England.

In 1876, the ground held its only first-class match when the North played the South.

The final recorded match on the ground came in 1877 when Rochdale played Burnley. The ground was later required for building and built over. The exact location of the ground is unknown, only that it was situated along Milnrow Road, which is still in existence to this day. A likely candidate for its location is an area of land halfway along the road which was called Park Fields.
