= Parr and Wisden's Ground =

Cricket ground in Leamington Spa

Coordinates: 52.28687°N 1.54306°W

- Interactive map of Parr and Wisden's Ground

Ground information
- Location: Leamington Spa, Warwickshire
- Country: England
- Establishment: 1848 (first recorded match)

Team information
North	(1849-1850)
- As of 28 August 2010; Source: Ground profile

Parr and Wisden's Ground was a cricket ground in Leamington Spa, Warwickshire. The ground was named after the famous duo of George Parr and John Wisden, who were the proprietors of the ground.

The first recorded match on the ground was in 1848, when Leamington played an All England Eleven. The ground hosted 2 first-class matches, the first of which came in 1849 and was between the North and the South. The second and final first-class match held at the ground came the following year in a repeat of the previous years fixture, with Parr and Wisden themselves playing in the North team. The final recorded match held on the ground came in 1862 and saw the Free Foresters play an All England Eleven.

As well as being a venue for cricket, the ground was also a notable archery venue. Today the ground has mostly been built on, though part of it makes up Victoria Park.
