= Charles Crofts (cricketer) =

English cricketer

Personal information
- Full name: Charles Daniel Crofts
- Born: 30 August 1822; Lewes, Sussex, England
- Died: 15 April 1893 (aged 70); Caythorpe, Lincolnshire, England

Domestic team information
- Years: Team
- 1840: Sussex
- 1843: Cambridge University

Career statistics
Competition	First-class
Matches	3
Runs scored	8
Batting average	1.60
100s/50s	0/0
Top score	7
Balls bowled	100
Wickets	3
Bowling average	?
5 wickets in innings	0
10 wickets in match	0
Best bowling	3/?
Catches/stumpings	1/–
- Source: Cricinfo, 14 March 2012

Charles Daniel Crofts (30 August 1822 – 15 April 1893) was an English cricketer. Crofts' batting and bowling styles are unknown.

Crofts was born at Lewes, Sussex, and was educated at Winchester College and St John's College, Cambridge. He made a single first-class appearance for Sussex against Nottinghamshire in 1840 at Trent Bridge. In Sussex's first-innings, he was dismissed for a duck by Thomas Barker, while in their second-innings he was dismissed for the same score by Sam Redgate. While studying at the University of Cambridge, he later made two first-class appearances for Cambridge University Cricket Club against Cambridge Town Club and Oxford University in 1843, though with little success.

He died at Caythorpe, Lincolnshire, on 15 April 1893.
