= William Garrat =

English cricketer

William Garrat (born 21 April 1805) was an English professional cricketer who played from 1832 to 1845.

A right-handed batsman who was mainly associated with Nottingham and Nottinghamshire, he made 32 known appearances. He represented the Players in the Gentlemen v Players series and the North in the North v. South series.

== Bibliography ==
- Haygarth, Arthur (1996) [1862]. Scores & Biographies, Volume 1 (1744–1826). Kennington: Frederick Lillywhite. ISBN 978-19-00592-23-9.
- Haygarth, Arthur (1997) [1862]. Scores & Biographies, Volume 2 (1827–1840). Kennington: Frederick Lillywhite. ISBN 978-19-00592-23-9.
