= 1839 English cricket season =

Cricket season review

The 1839 English cricket season was the 13th of the roundarm era. (Note: Any match listed in the ACS' Important Match Guide (1981) is historically important, and therefore of the highest standard, whether or not a scorecard might exist. The same applies to numerous matches discovered by researchers since 1981. For further information, see First-class cricket.) Sussex County Cricket Club was formally established as the first county club. It replaced the ad hoc county elevens that had hitherto represented the traditional county of Sussex in important matches.

== Important matches ==
1839 match list

== Events ==
1 March. Formation of Sussex County Cricket Club out of the Sussex Cricket Fund organisation that had been set up in 1836.

The new Sussex club played its first important match against MCC at Lord's on 10 & 11 June.

== Leading batsmen ==
Ned Wenman was the leading runscorer with 332 @ 18.44

Other leading batsmen were: CG Taylor, F Pilch, J Cobbett, T Sewell, A Mynn, J Guy, GL Langdon

== Leading bowlers ==
James Cobbett was the leading wicket-taker with 85

Other leading bowlers were: FW Lillywhite, J Bayley, E Sayres, A Mynn, WR Hillyer, GB Lee, S Redgate, J Dean, CG Taylor, JH Kirwan

== Bibliography ==
- ACS (1981). A Guide to Important Cricket Matches Played in the British Isles 1709–1863. Nottingham: ACS. OCLC 85045528.
- Haygarth, Arthur (1997) [1862]. Scores & Biographies, Volume 2 (1827–1840). Kennington: Frederick Lillywhite. ISBN 978-19-00592-23-9.
- Warner, Pelham (1946). Lords: 1787–1945. London: Harrap. OCLC 877106024.
