= Barker's Ground =

Cricket ground in Leicester, England

Coordinates: 52.63867°N 1.12732°W

- Interactive map of Barker's Ground

Ground information
- Location: Leicester, Leicestershire
- Country: England
- Establishment: 1825 (first recorded match)

Team information
North	(1836, 1842, 1844 & 1846)
Midland Counties	(1843)
- As of 25 August 2010; Source: Ground profile

Barker's Ground was a cricket ground in Leicester, Leicestershire. The first recorded match on the ground was in 1825, when Leicester played Sheffield. The first first-class match came in 1836, when the North played the South; the South won by 218 runs, largely due to Alfred Mynn's two not out innings. The North used the ground for 4 further first-class matches up to 1846, including the ground's final first-class match between the North and the Marylebone Cricket Club. Midland Counties played a single first-class match at Barker's Ground against the Marylebone Cricket Club in 1843. The final recorded match on the ground saw Leicestershire play an All England Eleven in 1860.

The owner of the ground was "Old Barker", the landlord of the Anchor Inn, Halford Street, who did very well from the gate money. The ground was sited on the east side of Wharf Street, near the Humberstone Road.

Following the final recorded match held at Barker's Ground, it was sold for building. Today, the ground would be located along Wharf Street, which is in the centre of Leicester.
