= Wavertree Road Ground =

Sports venue in Liverpool, England

Coordinates: 53.40529°N 2.94979°W

Ground information
- Location: Liverpool, Lancashire
- Establishment: 1847

Team information
Gentlemen of the North	(1859)
North	(1863 & 1872)
Lancashire	(1866)
- As of 4 September 2010; Source: profile

Wavertree Road Ground was a cricket ground in Liverpool, Lancashire. The first recorded match on the ground was in 1847, when Liverpool played Birkenhead Park.

In 1859, the ground held its first first-class match when the Gentlemen of the North played the Gentlemen of the South. The first-class match was held on the ground in 1863 when the North played the South. Lancashire played a single first-class match there in 1866 against Surrey. The final first-class match there came in 1872 when the North played the South.

The final recorded match held on the ground came in 1880 when Wavertree played the Gentlemen of Canada. Shortly after this match, the ground was sold for development and built over.
