= William Jeffrey Prowse =

Jeff Prowse
- Born: William Jeffrey Prowse; 6 May 1839; Torquay, Devon
- Died: 17 April 1870 (aged 30); Nice, France
- Citizenship: Great Britain
- Occupations: Journalist, poet, humorist and lyricist
- Writing career
- Language: English
- Subjects: Cricket, boat racing
- Notable works: Chambers' Journal, Ladies' Companion, National Magazine, Aylesbury News, Daily Telegraph

William Jeffrey Prowse, often known as Jeff Prowse (6 May 1839 – 17 April 1870) was an English journalist, poet, humorist and lyricist.

== Family ==
An only child born in Torquay, Devon, he resided with his uncle, the shipbroker John Sparke Prowse in Greenwich, following the death of his father in 1844 when Prowse aged eight. He inherited literary skills from his mother Marianne Jeffrey – who "contributed to the annuals, and published a volume of poems". She died in 1850.

== Writings and reputation ==
Prowse, a "journalist of great brilliancy and power", contributed to Chambers' Journal, Ladies' Companion, National Magazine and the Aylesbury News, before writing for the Daily Telegraph when covering the Oxford Cambridge boat races. Prowse was also noted for his affection for polar expeditions and cricket – and is known for a seven-verse eulogy for Alfred Mynn.

Prowse died in Nice on Easter Day, 17 April 1870. Thomas Hay Sweet Escott called him "the last of the highly-gifted Bohemians of London." The majority of his poems were published after his death in a volume entitled Nicholas Notes edited by Tom Hood, and in 1890 the Nation remembered the work as "yet a delight to the few who recall its pleasant humour."
