= Charles Croft =

Charles Croft may refer to:

- Charles Croft (MP) for Orford (UK Parliament constituency)
- Charles Croft, character in Just My Luck (1933 film)
- Charlie Croft, footballer

== See also ==
- Charles Crofts (disambiguation)
