= Charles Creswell =

English cricketer

Charles Creswell (10 March 1813 – 22 November 1882) was an English cricketer who played from 1836 to 1843. Mainly associated with Nottinghamshire, he made 12 known appearances. He represented the North in the North v. South series.

== Bibliography ==
- Haygarth, Arthur (1997) [1862]. Scores & Biographies, Volume 2 (1827–1840). Kennington: Frederick Lillywhite. ISBN 978-19-00592-23-9.
