= George Baigent =

English cricketer

Personal information
- Full name: George Baigent
- Born: 14 June 1817; Northchapel, Sussex, England
- Died: 14 December 1854 (aged 37); Preston Park, Sussex, England
- Batting: Unknown

Domestic team information
- Years: Team
- 1835: Sussex

Career statistics
Competition	First-class
Matches	2
Runs scored	9
Batting average	2.25
100s/50s	–/–
Top score	5
Balls bowled	–
Wickets	–
Bowling average	–
5 wickets in innings	–
10 wickets in match	–
Best bowling	–
Catches/stumpings	1/–
- Source: Cricinfo, 18 December 2011

George Baigent (14 June 1817 – 14 December 1854) was an English cricketer. Baigent's batting style is unknown. He was born at Northchapel, Sussex.

Baigent made two first-class appearances for Sussex in 1835 against Nottinghamshire and Yorkshire. In the first match against Nottinghamshire at the Forest New Ground, Nottingham, Baigent was dismissed for a duck in Sussex's first-innings by Sam Redgate, while in their second-innings he opened the batting but was run out for 5. Nottinghamshire won the match by 3 wickets. Against Yorkshire at the Hyde Park Ground, Sheffield, he was run out for 4 in Sussex's first-innings, while in their second-innings he was dismissed for a duck by James Cobbett. Yorkshire conceded the match at the end of Sussex's second-innings.

He died at Preston Park, Sussex on 14 December 1854.
