= Walter Mynn =

English cricketer

Walter Parker Mynn (24 November 1805 – 17 October 1878) was an English amateur cricketer who played between 1833 and 1852.

Mynn was born at Goudhurst in Kent, the son of a gentleman farmer. He made his first-class cricket debut in the 1833 Gentlemen v Players match at Lord's before going on to play 75 first-class matches during his career. He played mainly for Kent teams, including for the Gentlemen of Kent and for Kent County Cricket Club after its formation in 1842. His younger brother, Alfred Mynn, was a major part of the success of the Kent teams of the 1830s and 40s.

Mynn died at Peckham in 1878 aged 72.

== Bibliography ==
- Carlaw, Derek (2020). Kent County Cricketers, A to Z: Part One (1806–1914) (PDF). Cardiff: ACS.
