= Hawker Centre, Kingston-upon-Thames =

Sports ground in Surrey, England

Coordinates: 51.42657°N 0.30797°W

Hawker Centre
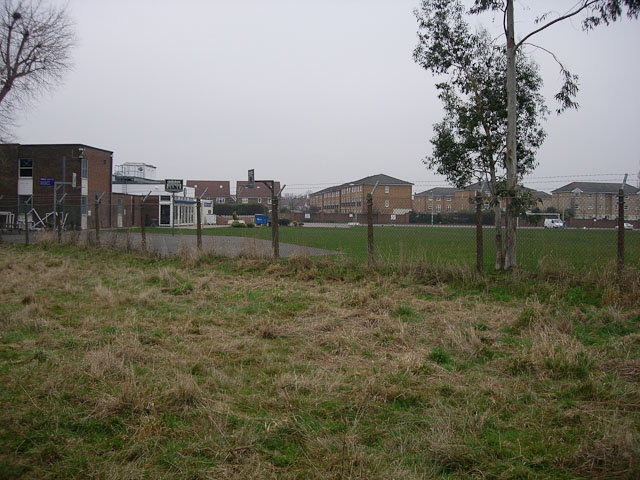

Ground information
- Location: Kingston-upon-Thames, Surrey
- Establishment: 1944 (first recorded match)

Team information
Surrey	(1946)
South	(1947–1952)
Surrey and Kent	(1947)
East	(1948)
England XI	(1950–1953)
Combined Services	(1953)
- As of 29 August 2010; Source: Ground profile

The Hawker Centre is a sports ground in Kingston-upon-Thames, Surrey. Originally the Hawker's Sports Ground, it was built and owned by the Hawker Aircraft company who had factories in Kingston-upon-Thames. The ground was known prior to 1948 as the Leyland Motors Ground, due to Hawker leasing their factory to Leyland Motors, a lease which expired in 1948. The aircraft factory was demolished in 1990 which alongside storage units were converted into a residential area keeping the sports ground. Since 2001 the ground has been maintained by the YMCA St Paul's Group under a lease by the Borough.

== Cricket ==
The first recorded match on the ground was in 1944, when Leyland Athletic played London Counties. The ground hosted its first first-class match in 1946, when Surrey played Hampshire. These first matches were organised to help raise money to repair the damage done to The Oval in the Second World War. A venue for first-class cricket from 1946 to 1953, it hosted first-class cricket for no less than seven teams, with the final first-class match at the ground in 1953 seeing an England XI play a Commonwealth XI.
