= Gary Allen (cricketer) =

New Zealand cricketer (1945–2022)

Personal information
- Full name: Gary Sol Allen
- Born: 11 August 1945; Wellington, New Zealand
- Died: 5 May 2022 (aged 76); Lower Hutt, New Zealand
- Batting: Left-handed
- Bowling: Left-arm medium-pace
- Relatives: Ray Allen (father)
- Source: Cricinfo, 23 October 2020

Gary Sol Allen (11 August 1945 – 5 May 2022) was a New Zealand cricketer. He played in three first-class and three List A matches for Wellington from 1976 to 1980.

Allen and his father, Ray Allen, who played for Wellington in the 1940s, operated the family trucking business WH Allen Ltd. Gary was prominent in harness racing, and he owned and bred several champion racehorses. He was chairman of Harness Racing New Zealand from 2011 to 2016.

== See also ==
- List of Wellington representative cricketers
