= George Rothera =

English cricketer

George Rothera (12 November 1809 – 31 October 1841) was an English cricketer who played from 1832 to 1837. Mainly associated with Nottingham Cricket Club, he made ten known appearances. He represented the North in the North v. South series.

== Bibliography ==
- Haygarth, Arthur (1996) [1862]. Scores & Biographies, Volume 1 (1744–1826). Kennington: Frederick Lillywhite. ISBN 978-19-00592-23-9.
- Haygarth, Arthur (1997) [1862]. Scores & Biographies, Volume 2 (1827–1840). Kennington: Frederick Lillywhite. ISBN 978-19-00592-23-9.
