= Bill Hendley =

New Zealand cricketer (1834–1895)

Personal information
- Full name: William Hendley
- Born: 16 November 1834; Pirton, Hertfordshire, England
- Died: 4 September 1895 (aged 60); Dunedin, New Zealand
- Height: 5 ft 10 1/2 in (1.79 m)
- Bowling: Right-arm medium-pace
- Role: Bowler

Domestic team information
- Years: Team
- 1864/65–1872/73: Otago

Career statistics
Competition	First-class
Matches	8
Runs scored	22
Batting average	2.00
100s/50s	0/0
Top score	11
Balls bowled	860
Wickets	37
Bowling average	8.48
5 wickets in innings	2
10 wickets in match	1
Best bowling	8/28
Catches/stumpings	9/–
- Source: ESPNcricinfo, 4 April 2023

William Hendley (16 November 1834 – 4 September 1895) (Note: His age at death was given as 57, so he may have been born in 1837 or 1838.) was a New Zealand cricketer. He played eight first-class matches for Otago between 1864 and 1873.

== Life and career ==
Hendley was born in England, where he worked as a farm labourer in East Anglia before migrating to the Victorian goldfields in about 1860. He played cricket in the Castlemaine area between 1860 and 1864.

Hendley moved to Dunedin in 1864 and took up the position of groundsman and professional bowler and coach with the Dunedin Cricket Club. A right-arm medium-paced bowler, he was a strong man, five feet ten and a half inches tall, said to be able to carry a sack of wheat under each arm.

Hendley was one of the first bowlers in first-class cricket to run out a batsman who was backing up out of his crease. He did it on two occasions, both against Canterbury: dismissing Walter Wilson in February 1865, and Richard Powys in February 1866. The dismissals were considered unusual but not controversial. The Lyttelton Times reporter in February 1865 was evidently unfamiliar with the mode of dismissal and recorded it among the scores as "Mr. Wilson, st and b Hendley 2" – that is, stumped and bowled by Hendley, which is not a possible dismissal under the laws of cricket.

In his first match for Otago, Hendley took 5 for 37 and 2 for 26 in a four-wicket loss to Canterbury in the 1865 match when he ran out Wilson. His best first-class bowling figures were 8 for 28 and 3 for 34, when Otago beat Canterbury by four wickets in December 1869.

Hendley remained active in Dunedin cricket for the rest of his life, as groundsman, coach, umpire and professional player and bowler. A few days after his death from pneumonia in September 1895 a new club was inaugurated in Dunedin and named the Hendley Cricket Club in his honour.

Hendley's wife Jane died of consumption in 1879, and their three young daughters were admitted to the Industrial School in Dunedin, where neglected and orphaned children were housed and trained for useful work. The daughters all grew up, and Hendley's will left "a little money for division" among them.
