= Reg Routledge =

English cricketer

Personal information
- Full name: Reginald Routledge
- Born: 12 June 1920; North Kensington, London, England
- Died: 2011 (aged 91); Gosport, Hampshire, England
- Batting: Right-handed
- Bowling: Right-arm medium

Domestic team information
- Years: Team
- 1946-1954: Middlesex
- 1947: Devon
- 1951: MCC

Career statistics
Competition	First-class
Matches	65
Runs scored	1,331
Batting average	16.63
100s/50s	2/5
Top score	121
Balls bowled	3,433
Wickets	38
Bowling average	42.21
5 wickets in innings	0
10 wickets in match	0
Best bowling	4/29
Catches/stumpings	38/–
- Source: Cricinfo, 26 May 2020

Reginald Routledge (12 June 1920 – 2011) was an English cricketer. He was a right-handed batsman who bowled right-arm medium pace.

Reg Routledge was born in North Kensington, London and made his first-class debut for Middlesex against Somerset in the 1946 County Championship.

He did not play first-class cricket the following season, playing two Minor Counties Championship fixtures for Devon instead, but he played first-class cricket for Middlesex again from 1948 to 1954.

Routledge played a total of 65 first-class matches, including one for the Marylebone Cricket Club in 1951 against Essex. As a batsman at first-class level he was initially a tailender, before developing into a middle-order batsman.

In 64 first-class matches for Middlesex, he scored 1,305 runs at a batting average of 16.51, with five half centuries and two centuries. His highest score of 121 came against Worcestershire in 1953. An occasional bowler, Routledge took 38 wickets with his medium pace at a bowling average of 41.57, with best figures of 4/29. Routledge was also an occasional player for the Middlesex Second XI in the Minor Counties Championship. He was released by the county following a poor 1954 season.

He coached at the City of London School in 1957.

Reg Routledge died in Gosport, Hampshire in 2011 at the age of 91.
