= 1846 English cricket season =

Cricket season review

The 1846 English cricket season was the 20th of the roundarm era.

Four inter-county fixtures were played among a total of 27 historically important matches. (Note: Any match listed in the ACS' Important Match Guide (1981) is historically important, and therefore of the highest standard, whether or not a scorecard might exist. The same applies to numerous matches discovered by researchers since 1981. For further information, see First-class cricket.) Kent was the most active team, playing two matches each against England, Surrey, and Sussex. Ten matches involved Marylebone Cricket Club (MCC), while other fixtures included Gentlemen v Players and the University Match. Among the season's leading players were Thomas Box, William Clarke, Jemmy Dean, Nicholas Felix, William Hillyer, William Lillywhite, Will Martingell, Alfred Mynn, George Parr, Charles Taylor, and John Wisden.

William Clarke founded his All England Eleven (the AEE) which, taking advantage of the railways, travelled throughout Great Britain, and was a significant factor in the spread of cricket. The AEE played their first match against a Sheffield XX on the Hyde Park Ground from 31 August to 2 September, Sheffield winning by 5 wickets.

== Important matches ==
- 1846 match list

== Events ==
The earliest match at the Oval was Surrey Club v. MCC on 25 & 26 May. Only 194 runs were scored in the match with a top score of 13. William Hillyer took 14 wickets to help MCC win by 48 runs.

The new Surrey County Cricket Club played its first important match against Kent at the Oval on 25 & 26 June, winning by 10 wickets.

Social conditions, including the railways, were a major factor in the debut of the travelling All England Eleven (the AEE). The team was founded in Nottingham by William Clarke, who also opened the Trent Bridge cricket ground. The first AEE match was at Sheffield in September and they played others in Manchester and Leeds.

The All England Eleven played its inaugural fixture against a Sheffield XX in September. The AEE team was: W Clarke, J Dean, W Dorrinton, F Pilch, A Mynn, J Guy, W Martingell, T Sewell, G Butler, VC Smith and W Hillyer. Other players who represented the AEE in its early days included G Parr, FW Lillywhite, N Felix, W Denison, T Box and OC Pell.

== Leading batsmen ==
T Box was the leading runscorer with 413 @ 20.65

Other leading batsmen were: N Felix, CG Taylor, A Mynn, WR Hillyer, J Dean, RP Long, TM Adams, G Parr

== Leading bowlers ==
WR Hillyer was the leading wicket-taker with 152

Other leading bowlers were: A Mynn, FW Lillywhite, J Dean, W Martingell, W Clarke, J Wisden

== Bibliography ==
- ACS (1981). A Guide to Important Cricket Matches Played in the British Isles 1709–1863. Nottingham: ACS. OCLC 85045528.
