= John Smith (cricketer, born 1919) =

New Zealand cricketer

Personal information
- Born: 1 July 1919; Christchurch, New Zealand
- Died: 25 June 1999 (aged 79); Christchurch, New Zealand
- Batting: Left-handed

Domestic team information
- Years: Team
- 1943-44 to 1945-46: Canterbury

Career statistics
Competition	First-class
Matches	5
Runs scored	194
Batting average	27.71
100s/50s	0/1
Top score	51
Balls bowled	0
Wickets	–
Bowling average	–
5 wickets in innings	–
10 wickets in match	–
Best bowling	–
Catches/stumpings	1/0
- Source: CricketArchive, 13 July 2020

John Smith (1 July 1919 – 25 June 1999) was a New Zealand cricketer who played first-class cricket for Canterbury from 1943 to 1946.

A middle-order batsman, Smith made his highest first-class score against Otago in 1945–46, when he made 20 and 51. In February 1944, playing against Wellington, he was run out for 43 by the bowler, Ray Allen, while backing up; Allen had previously warned him against leaving the crease too soon.
