= Ray Allen (cricketer) =

New Zealand cricketer

Personal information
- Born: 27 October 1908; Wellington, New Zealand
- Died: 2 August 1979 (aged 70); Wellington, New Zealand
- Batting: Left-handed
- Bowling: Slow left-arm orthodox
- Relatives: Gary Allen (son)

Domestic team information
- Years: Team
- 1941/42–1953/54: Wellington

Career statistics
Competition	First-class
Matches	12
Runs scored	136
Batting average	17.00
100s/50s	0/0
Top score	31*
Balls bowled	1,906
Wickets	41
Bowling average	24.51
5 wickets in innings	3
10 wickets in match	0
Best bowling	5/58
Catches/stumpings	7/–
- Source: Cricinfo, 19 July 2019

Raymond Allen (27 October 1908 – 2 August 1979) was a New Zealand cricketer who played first-class cricket for Wellington from 1942 to 1954.

A left-arm spin bowler, Allen took five wickets in an innings in each of Wellington's two matches against Auckland in 1944–45, and was chosen to represent North Island at the end of the season. His best figures were 5 for 58 in his last first-class match, against the touring Fijians in 1953–54.

Playing for Kilbirnie in Wellington club cricket and in minor matches for Wellington in the 1935–36 season he took 100 wickets at an average of 12.37. In February 1944, he ran out the Canterbury batsman John Smith while Smith was backing up; he had previously warned Smith against leaving the crease too soon.

His son Gary played first-class cricket for Wellington in the 1970s.
