= Stoddart Campbell =

Australian cricketer

Personal information
- Full name: Stoddart William Grylls Campbell
- Born: 19 September 1846; Melbourne, Australia
- Died: 2 September 1903 (aged 56); Melbourne, Australia
- Batting: Right-handed
- Role: Batsman

Domestic team information
- Years: Team
- 1866–1876: Victoria

Career statistics
Competition	First-class
Matches	11
Runs scored	167
Batting average	8.78
100s/50s	0/0
Top score	37
Balls bowled	0
Wickets	0
Bowling average	N/A
5 wickets in innings	0
10 wickets in match	0
Best bowling	N/A
Catches/stumpings	2/0
- Source: Cricinfo, 3 May 2015

Stoddart Campbell (19 September 1846 – 2 September 1903) was an Australian cricketer. He played eleven first-class cricket matches for Victoria between 1866 and 1876.

== See also ==
- List of Victoria first-class cricketers
