= Frederick Gale =

English cricketer and cricket writer

Personal information
- Born: 16 July 1823; Woodborough, Wiltshire
- Died: 24 April 1904 (aged 80); London Charterhouse, City of London
- Nickname: Old Buffer
- Batting: Right-handed

Domestic team information
- Years: Team
- 1845: Kent
- 1845: Gentlemen of Kent

Career statistics
Competition	First-class
Matches	2
Runs scored	23
Batting average	7.66
100s/50s	0/0
Top score	10
Catches/stumpings	0/–
- Source: CricketArchive, 18 June 2025

Frederick Gale (16 July 1823 – 24 April 1904) was an English cricket writer and cricketer who played in two first-class cricket matches in 1845.

By profession Gale was a solicitor in Westminster and a Parliamentary agent, but he was also a prolific writer and journalist, often using the pen name "Old Buffer". His books included The Game of Cricket and the ghost-written memoirs of the cricketer Robert Grimston. As a journalist and columnist he contributed to Baily's Magazine of Sports and Pastimes, continuing to write until his death.

Gale was born at Woodborough in Wiltshire, the son of a Church of England clergyman who was rector of Godmersham between 1829 and 1864. He was educated at Winchester College. He played in the Winchester cricket XI and later as an amateur cricketer for a variety of teams, including teams representing Surrey, but his two matches for Kent County Cricket Club and the Gentlemen of Kent in 1845 are the only ones to have been accorded first-class status.

Living for many years at Mitcham in Surrey, Gale took a keen interest in Surrey County Cricket Club. He married Claudia Severn in 1852; the couple had a son and four daughters. Gale moved to Manitoba in Canada in 1891 but later returned to England and was a visitor at The Oval until the year before his death. He died in 1904 at the age of 80 at the London Charterhouse in the City of London.

== Books ==
- Public School Matches and Those We Meet There, 1853 & 1867
- Ups and Downs of a Public School, 1859
- Echoes from Old Cricket Fields, 1871
- Memoir of Hon. R. Grimston, 1885
- Modern English Sports, 1885
- Sports and Recreations, 1885
- The Game of Cricket, 1887

== Bibliography ==
- Carlaw, Derek (2020). Kent County Cricketers, A to Z: Part One (1806–1914) (PDF). Cardiff: ACS.
