= 1843 English cricket season =

Cricket season review

The 1843 English cricket season was the 17th of the roundarm era. (Note: Any match listed in the ACS' Important Match Guide (1981) is historically important, and therefore of the highest standard, whether or not a scorecard might exist. The same applies to numerous matches discovered by researchers since 1981. For further information, see First-class cricket.)

== Important matches ==
- 1843 match list

== Leading batsmen ==
CG Taylor was the leading runscorer with 372 @ 16.90

Other leading batsmen were: F Pilch, J Dean, EG Wenman, A Mynn, R Kynaston, C Hawkins, JRLE Bayley, T Sewell

== Leading bowlers ==
WR Hillyer was the leading wicket-taker with 133

Other leading bowlers were: FW Lillywhite, A Mynn, J Dean, W Clarke

== Bibliography ==
- ACS (1981). A Guide to Important Cricket Matches Played in the British Isles 1709–1863. Nottingham: ACS. OCLC 85045528.
- Warner, Pelham (1946). Lords: 1787–1945. London: Harrap. OCLC 877106024.
