= 1852 English cricket season =

Cricket season review

The 1852 English cricket season was the 26th of the roundarm era. (Note: Any match listed in the ACS' Important Match Guide (1981) is historically important, and therefore of the highest standard, whether or not a scorecard might exist. The same applies to numerous matches discovered by researchers since 1981. For further information, see First-class cricket.) The United All England Eleven was established as a rival to the AEE.]

== Important matches ==
- 1852 match list

== Events ==
The United All England Eleven was established as a rival to the AEE. J Dean and J Wisden were the main organisers and other players to represent the UEE in its early years included John Lillywhite, T Lockyer, J Grundy, F P Miller, W Mortlock and T Sherman.

27 July. John Sherman made his final appearance for Manchester v. Sheffield at Hyde Park, Sheffield. His career had spanned 44 seasons from his debut at Lord's on 20 Sept 1809 when he played for Beauclerk's XI v. Ladbroke's XI. His was the longest career span, equalled only by W. G. Grace.

== Leading batsmen ==
N Felix was the leading runscorer with 529 @ 18.24

Other leading batsmen were: W Nicholson, G Parr, J Guy, T Box, W Caffyn, J Dean, J Caesar, W Martingell

== Leading bowlers ==
J Grundy was the leading wicket-taker 103

Other leading bowlers were: W Clarke, J Wisden, W Martingell, T Nixon, T Sherman, J Bickley, J Dean, A Mynn

== Bibliography ==
- ACS (1981). A Guide to Important Cricket Matches Played in the British Isles 1709–1863. Nottingham: ACS. OCLC 85045528.
- Warner, Pelham (1946). Lords: 1787–1945. London: Harrap. OCLC 877106024.
