= 1961 English cricket season =

1961 was the 62nd season of County Championship cricket in England. Australia retained the Ashes by winning the Test series 2–1. Hampshire won their first championship title.

== Honours ==
- County Championship – Hampshire
- Minor Counties Championship – Somerset II
- Second XI Championship – Kent II
- Wisden – Bill Alley, Richie Benaud, Alan Davidson, Bill Lawry, Norm O'Neill

== Test series ==
Richie Benaud's Australian team defeated England 2–1 with two matches drawn. On paper, both teams were strong. England had Peter May, Colin Cowdrey, Ken Barrington, Ted Dexter, Fred Trueman, Brian Statham and Tony Lock, though Cowdrey and Lock had poor series. Their most consistent batsman was Raman Subba Row. Australia had Bill Lawry and Graham McKenzie in their first series, Neil Harvey, Peter Burge, Bobby Simpson (who had a poor series), Norm O'Neill, Wally Grout and Alan Davidson, as well as their captain.

After the first match was drawn, Australia had their traditional victory at Lord's, by 5 wickets on a lively pitch. Davidson did the damage in the first England innings and McKenzie in the second. Lawry's 130 in Australia's first innings, when nobody else on either team made more than 66 in either innings, was crucial.

England won by 8 wickets at Headingley, Australia collapsing in their second innings from 99–2 to 120 all out, thanks to Trueman's devastating spell of off-cutters. He finished with figures of 6-30, having taken 5–58 in the first innings.

The Fourth Test at Old Trafford proved decisive. It was won by Australia by 54 runs. The last day was very exciting, seeing many turns of fortune. England had managed a first innings lead of 177. Australia's second innings had reached 331–6 at the close of the fourth day, a lead of 154. On the final morning, David Allen took 3 wickets quickly, reducing Australia to 334–9, and the game seemed won. But Davidson then took the attack to the bowlers, hitting Allen for 20 in an over, and with help from McKenzie added 98 for the last wicket. England needed 256 to win at 67 runs an hour. Dexter, well supported by Subba Row, scored 76 in 84 minutes and took England to 150–1, and strong favourites to win. But Benaud went round the wicket and aimed at the bowlers' footmarks, and caused a collapse. He finished with 6-70, and Australia won with 20 minutes to spare, thereby retaining The Ashes. The final Test was drawn, after Australia had taken a big first innings lead.

Cumulative record - Test wins	1876–1961
England	63
Australia	76
Drawn	44

== Leading batsmen ==
Bill Lawry topped the averages with 2019 runs @ 61.18. Bill Alley, at the age of 42, scored most runs: 3019 @ 56.96. This is the most recent occasion on which a batsman has reached the 3000 mark and, with the subsequent reduction in the first-class programme, it is unlikely that the feat will ever be done again.

== Leading bowlers ==
Jack Flavell topped the averages with 171 wickets @ 17.79

== Annual reviews ==
- Playfair Cricket Annual 1962
- Wisden Cricketers' Almanack 1962
