= Charles Taylor (cricketer, born 1816) =

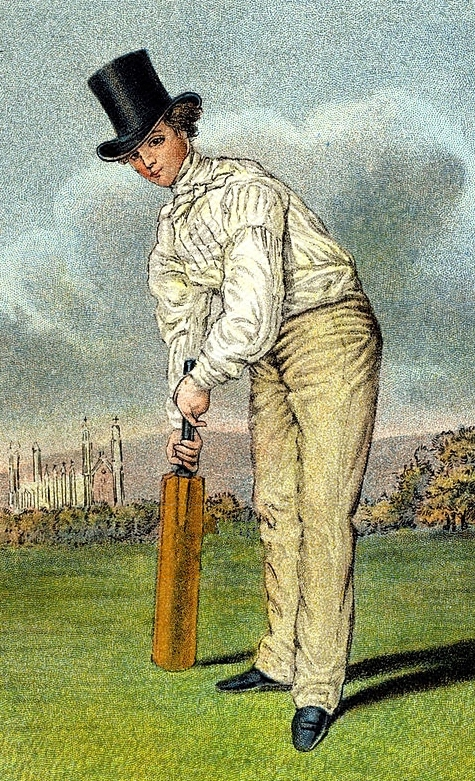

Personal information
- Born: 21 November 1816 at Turnham Green, Middlesex, England
- Died: 10 September 1869 (aged 52); Frensham, Surrey, England
- Batting: Right-handed
- Bowling: Right-arm slow

Charles George Taylor (21 November 1816 – 10 September 1869) was an English cricketer in the mid-19th century who played, as an amateur, mainly for Sussex and Marylebone Cricket Club (MCC), having begun his career at Cambridge University.

Taylor was educated at Eton and Emmanuel College, Cambridge. He was a good all-rounder who batted right-handed and bowled right-arm slow, roundarm style. He was the first captain of Sussex, appointed when the club was founded in 1839 and holding the post until 1846.

Taylor made his known debut in the 1836 season and had 125 known appearances in major matches to the 1859 season. He scored 3088 runs with an average of 14.29 and a highest innings of 114, which was one of two centuries he achieved. He took 69 catches and 287 wickets with a best tally of eight in one innings. He is known to have taken 10 wickets in a match on six occasions.

His Aunt, Martha Harrington bequeathed Marlborough House in Brighton to him in 1849.

He married Elizabeth Reynolds, daughter of Lawrence Reynolds of Paxton Hall, Little Paxton. They had many children including:

- Margaret Elizabeth Taylor, who married firstly John Dillon Browne, had a daughter, then married secondly to Sir Wyndham Knatchbull, 12th Baronet
