= James Cobbett =

English cricketer (1804–1842)

Personal information
- Full name: James Cobbett
- Born: 12 January 1804; Frimley, Surrey
- Died: 31 March 1842 (aged 38); Marylebone, London
- Batting: Right-handed
- Bowling: Slow
- Role: All-rounder

James Cobbett (12 January 1804 – 31 March 1842) was an English professional cricketer who played from 1826 to 1841 for Middlesex, Surrey, and Sheffield Cricket Club. According to The Cricketer and Wisden, he was said to be "the finest all-rounder of his day", Cobbett was a right-handed batsman, occasional wicket-keeper and right arm slow roundarm bowler.

Cobbett began as an MCC ground staff bowler who occasionally stood as umpire. He started a playing career with Middlesex in 1826, as Surrey - the county of his birth - featured little in cricket at the time. He played only once for them in 1839, as well as matches for Yorkshire in 1835. He represented the Players in the Gentlemen v Players series and the South in the North v. South series. But it was for the MCC between 1830 and 1841, that he made most of his appearances: 47 in all, scoring 78 runs and taking 311 wickets.
