= Thomas Barker (cricketer, born 1798) =

English cricketer

Thomas Barker (15 November 1798 – 2 March 1877) was an English professional cricketer, who played from 1826 to 1845. He was a right-handed batsman and a roundarm fast bowler. He became an umpire when his playing career ended.

Barker was born in Carlton, Nottinghamshire. He was a member of the former Nottingham Cricket Club which evolved into Nottinghamshire County Cricket Club during his career and he was mainly associated with these two clubs. He also played for Marylebone Cricket Club (MCC) and was the first Nottingham player to represented the Players in the 1834 Gentlemen v Players fixture. He bowled at an extremely fast pace, using a roundarm action. William Denison wrote of his style: "So violent was it, that he sometimes ran up to the crease and propelled his instrument of attack as though his head would follow the ball."

Barker made 72 known appearances in important matches. He scored 1269 runs at 10.57 with a highest score of 58, that being his sole half-century. He took 34 catches. His bowling statistics are incomplete because for much of his career, bowlers were not credited with wickets falling to catches. Even so, he averaged nearly three wickets per match, with 210 known wickets at 14.77 with a best performance of seven in an innings. He took ten wickets in a match four times. He is also notable for completing the first five recorded "mankad" dismissals.

In 1843, Barker was badly injured in an accident involving a horse-drawn cab in London. As a result, he had to stop playing in 1845 and was engaged by the MCC as an umpire. He stood in 70 important matches until 1865. During the winter months, he worked in Nottingham as a stockinger.

He died in Nottingham, aged 78.
