= South of England cricket team =

Combined representative team from 1836–1961

The South of England played from 1836 and 1961, most often in the showcase North v. South matches against the North of England, although there were also games against touring teams, Marylebone Cricket Club (MCC) and others.

The South became a major and prestigious team in 19th-century English cricket due to its composition from some of the best players in county cricket. The North v South match was one of the major fixtures in the 19th-century cricketing calendar, along with Gentlemen v Players.

== History ==
Cricket in the 18th century had been predominantly a southern game, played especially in London and the southeastern counties. It had spread to the northern counties by the 1770s, which made cricket promoters aware of commercial possibilities in a North v South fixture.

The inaugural North v. South fixture was held at Lord's on 11 & 12 July 1836. The North won by 6 wickets.

From 1849, the match became virtually an annual fixture, sometimes contested multiple times in a year.

In 1864, a disagreement among professional cricketers caused the creation of the United South of England Eleven. A change to the North v South fixture's rules between 1866 and 1868 set the River Thames as the North–South dividing line. This effectively restricted the South's catchment to the counties of Hampshire, Kent, Surrey and Sussex.

In the 1890s, the South was captained by W.G. Grace.

In all, there were 155 North v South matches. The South won 62; the North won 55; 37 were drawn, and one match in 1889 was abandoned.

== External sources ==
- CricketArchive – list of fixtures
