= North of England cricket team =

Defunct English cricket team

The North of England cricket team, always called North in scorecards and records, was active in first-class cricket from 1836 to 1961, and played a total of 194 matches. One more match in May 1889 was abandoned without starting because of bad weather.

155 matches, including the abandoned one, were against the South of England cricket team (the South) in the traditional North v South fixture which began in 1836 and became, for many years, a seasonal event. Two of these matches—at Bramall Lane in 1927, and at Edgbaston in 1949—were played as Test trials. The North's other opponents were Marylebone Cricket Club (MCC) in 15 matches, Surrey (13), Australians (10), Nottinghamshire (once), and the United South of England Eleven (once).

Players who represented the North would typically come from one of the four northern teams in the County Championship—Derbyshire, Lancashire, Nottinghamshire, or Yorkshire. Among them were famous players like Johnny Briggs, William Clarke, George Duckworth, Tom Emmett, George Hirst, Len Hutton, Ray Illingworth, John Jackson, Harold Larwood, Archie MacLaren, George Parr, Wilfred Rhodes, Alfred Shaw, Arthur Shrewsbury, Fred Spofforth, Brian Statham, Herbert Sutcliffe, Johnny Tyldesley, George Ulyett, and Hedley Verity. However, there was no definite boundary between North and South, so many players from county teams in the Midlands played for the North, and "borderline" players could be selected for either team. For example, Dennis Brookes of Northamptonshire played in several matches for the North from 1946 to 1958, but in 1953 he played for the South.

== Early matches ==
The North's first two matches were in 1836, both against the South. They played at Lord's in July, and the North won by six wickets. The return match was in August at the old Barker's Ground in Leicester, and the South won that by 218 runs. The fixture was repeated in July 1837 as a "Grand Jubilee Match" at Lord's, celebrating the fiftieth anniversary of MCC's foundation. The South won a low-scoring game by five wickets. There was one more match at Lord's in June 1838, and then the fixture was set aside until July 1849. In the meantime, the North played MCC fourteen times between July 1840 and June 1848.
