= List of Manchester Cricket Club players =

This is a list in alphabetical order of cricketers who played for Manchester in historically important matches prior to the foundation of Lancashire County Cricket Club in 1864. Some of the teams fielded by Manchester were styled Lancashire and its players in those matches are included here. Manchester is classified as an important team by substantial sources from 1844 to 1864.

The details are the player's usual name followed by the years in which he was active as a Manchester/Lancashire player and then his name is given as it appears on match scorecards (i.e., usually his surname preceded by all initials). Note that many players represented other important teams besides Manchester and that several played for the county club from 1865, at which time Manchester ceased to be an important team.

== A ==
- Tom Adams (1851) : T. M. Adams
- John Adamthwaite (1832–1845) : J. Adamthwaite
- William Armitstead (1852–1853) : W. G. Armitstead
- Aspinall (1844) : Aspinall

== B ==
- Samuel Baldwinson (1845–1846) : S. Baldwinson
- Robert Barlow (1850–1852) : R. A. Barlow
- Richard Bellhouse (1845–1865) : R. T. Bellhouse
- Thomas Bellhouse (1841–1864) : T. T. Bellhouse
- Lea Birch (1826–1853) : L. Birch
- Scholes Birch (1845–1854) : S. Birch
- Joseph Birley (1847–1853) : J. H. Birley
- Thomas Blain (1850–1860) : T. G. Blain
- David Bleakley (1852–1863) : D. Bleakley
- C. Bradshaw (1844–1849) : C. Bradshaw
- Henry Brandt (1854–1857) : H. Brandt
- Stephen Braybrooke (1841–1853) : S. H. Braybrooke
- John Buttery (1847–1852) : J. Buttery

== C ==
- Julius Caesar (1851) : J. Caesar
- William Caffyn (1851–1858) : W. Caffyn
- Charles Cameron (1849) : C. F. Cameron
- James Clegg (1854–1856) : J. Clegg
- George Cooke (1845–1858) : G. F. Cooke
- Henry Cooke (1840–1851) : H. Cooke

== D ==
- Samuel Dakin (1852) : S. Dakin
- George Dallas (1849) : G. F. Dallas
- Thomas Davis (1857) : T. Davis
- Alfred Diver (1852) : A. J. D. Diver

== E ==
- John Earl senior (1844–45) : J. Earl
- John Henry Earl (1849–52) : J. H. Earl
- Charles Elmhirst (1848) : C. Elmhirst

== G ==
- W. Galloway (1852–1858) : W. Galloway
- Arthur Girling (1845–1848) : A. Girling

== H ==
- R. Hampson (1827–1855) : R. Hampson
- Thomas Heighes (1851–1857) : T. Heighes
- Tom Hunt (1846–1858) : T. Hunt
- A. Hutton (1851) : A. Hutton

== K ==
- William Kington (1858–1859) : W. M. N. Kington

== L ==
- Charles Langton (1849) : C. Langton
- John Lillywhite (1848–1857) : J. Lillywhite

== M ==
- William Mackworth (1847–1848) : W. A. Mackworth
- Joseph Makinson (1857) : J. Makinson
- James Marchanton (1854–1858) : J. Marchanton
- Edward Martin (1848) : E. Martin
- J. Martin (1846) : J. Martin
- T. McConnell (1842–1844) : T. McConnell
- Pierrepont Mundy (1845) : P. H. Mundy

== P ==
- Elgar Pagden (1845–1851) : E. C. Pagden
- J. Paget (1851) : J. Paget
- Frederick Perera (1857–1858) : F. Perera
- Henry Pickford (1842–1857) : H. Pickford
- J. E. Price (1852) : J. E. Price

== R ==
- Charles Rogers (1858) : C. Rogers
- Daniel Rowland (1849) : D. Rowland
- Alexander Rowley (1854–1876) : A. B. Rowley
- James Rowley (1849–1859) : J. C. Rowley

== S ==
- G. Shaw (1851) : G. Shaw
- Shepherd (1844–1845) : Shepherd
- John Sherman (1844–1852) : J. Sherman
- Tom Sherman (1851) : T. Sherman
- Thomas Smelt (1848–1859) : T. Smelt

== T ==
- S. Taylor (1851–1852) : S. Taylor
- Frederick Thackeray (1845) : F. Thackeray
- Cris Tinley (1851) : R. C. Tinley
- Vincent Tinley (1850–1851) : V. Tinley

== W ==
- J. Walker (1849) : J. Walker
- Edward Whitlow (1852–1857) : E. H. Whitlow
- John Whittington (1853–1865) : J. Whittington
- George Wigzell (1849) : G. Wigzell
- John Wisden (1852–1857) : J. Wisden
- J. Womack (1845–1852) : J. Womack
- Edward Wright (1832–1850) : E. Wright
- Henry Wright (1857–1858) : G. H. Wright

== See also ==
- List of Lancashire County Cricket Club players
