= Hugh Rowley =

England international rugby union player

- Born: Hugh Campbell Rowley; 27 April 1858 Chorlton-on-Medlock
- Died: Unknown

Rugby union career
- Position: Forward
Amateur team(s)
Years	Team	Apps	(Points)
- Bowdon and Lymm Club
c. 1879	Manchester Football Club		
1877–1878	Cheshire		
1879–c. 1881	Lancashire		
–	North of England		
International career
Years	Team	Apps	(Points)
1879–1882	England	9	

Hugh Campbell Rowley (27 April 1858 – after 1889) was an English rugby union footballer who played in the 1870s and 1880s. He played at representative level for England from 1879 to 1882, and at club level for Bowdon and Lymm Club, and Manchester Rugby Club, as a forward.

== Early life ==
Rowley was born in Chorlton-on-Medlock, the son of solicitor and first-class cricketer James Campbell Rowley. His uncles Alexander Rowley and Edmund Rowley, and cousin Ernest Rowley, were also first-class cricketers.

== Rugby union career ==
Rowley was originally a member of the Bowdon and Lymm Club, and was selected from this club to represent the county of Cheshire in the first match between Cheshire and Lancashire on 24 February 1877. He had the distinction of scoring the first try in that match, and the first point of importance against Lancashire. Ironically, Rowley then went on to play in and for Lancashire, transferring to the Manchester Football Club, and representing Lancashire in 1879 for whom he played over a number of years. He was also selected to play in several North v. South matches, once the pinnacle of domestic rugby competition.

Rowley made his international debut for England on 10 March 1879 in the match against Scotland match at Edinburgh. He played eight more times for England, (vs Scotland in 1879-80-81-82; vs Ireland, 1879-80-81-82; and Wales, 1881.)

Of the nine matches he played for his national side the team won five times, lost once, and drew three times.

He played his final match for England on 4 March 1882 against Scotland at Whalley Range, Manchester.

He was described in a contemporary account as a celebrated player and "one of the best all-round men who ever played the Rugby game." The account went on to say "Campbell Rowley was one of the most useful of football players, very strong and fast, was never done with, could play any position in the field equally well, and had his whole heart in the game."

== Later life ==
Rowley worked as a solicitor. He emigrated in 1882 and settled in Winnipeg, Manitoba, Canada, and then moved to Alaska. He married Maud Arrowsmith in 1889.
