= James Rowley (cricketer) =

English cricketer

Personal information
- Full name: James Campbell Rowley
- Born: 1830; Manchester, Lancashire, England
- Died: 17 November 1870 (aged 40); Wealdstone, Middlesex, England
- Batting: Unknown
- Bowling: Unknown
- Relatives: Alexander Rowley, Jr. (brother); Edmund Rowley (brother); Ernest Rowley (nephew); Hugh Rowley (son)

Domestic team information
- Years: Team
- 1851: Lancashire

Career statistics
Competition	First-class
Matches	5
Runs scored	84
Batting average	8.40
100s/50s	–/–
Top score	27
Balls bowled	40
Wickets	2
Bowling average	?
5 wickets in innings	–
10 wickets in match	–
Best bowling	1/?
Catches/stumpings	–/–
- Source: Cricinfo, 25 July 2019

James Campbell Rowley (1830 – 17 November 1870) was an English first-class cricketer.

The son of Alexander Butler Rowley and his wife, Elizabeth, Rowley was born at Manchester in 1830. He was by profession a solicitor, having been admitted in 1852 and practicing in Manchester with the family firm, Rowley, Page, & Rowley.

He made his debut in first-class cricket for Lancashire against Yorkshire at Sheffield in July 1851, before playing in the return fixture at Manchester in August. The following year he made two first-class appearances, playing for Manchester against the Marylebone Cricket Club, and for the Gentlemen of the North against the Gentlemen of the South, with both matches played at Lord's. His final first-class appearance came in 1854, for Manchester against Sheffield at Manchester in 1854. He scored 84 runs in his five first-class matches, in addition to taking two wickets.

He also played below first-class level for Shropshire in one match in 1861, but did not score.

Prior to his death, Rowley had invested heavily in mining in Colorado. Rowley was one of eight fatalities on 17 November 1870 in a railway accident at Harrow & Wealdstone station. The following year, his mother sued the London and North Western Railway for negligence. The lawsuit concluded with his mother being awarded £1,200, his widow £1,400 and £600 to each of his six children. His son Hugh Rowley was a rugby union footballer. His brothers, Alexander and Edmund, both played first-class cricket, as did his nephew Ernest Rowley.
