= Charles Cameron =

Charles Cameron may refer to:

- Charles Cameron (architect) (1743–1812), Scottish architect who worked in Russia
- Charles Cameron (colonial administrator) (1766–1820), British officer and governor of the Bahamas, 1804–20
- Charles Cameron (cricketer) (1819–?), Irish cricketer
- Charlie Cameron (footballer, born 1886) (1886–1957), Australian rules footballer who played for South Melbourne and Geelong
- Charles Cameron (footballer, born 1907) (1907–1960), Australian rules footballer who played for North Melbourne and Fitzroy
- Charlie Cameron (footballer, born 1874) (1874–1936), Australian rules footballer who played for Fitzroy
- Charlie Cameron (footballer, born 1994), Australian rules footballer who plays for the Brisbane Lions
- Charles Cameron (magician) (1927–2001), Scottish magician
- Sir Charles Cameron, 1st Baronet (1841–1924), member of parliament for Glasgow 1874–1885, Glasgow College 1885–1895, Glasgow Bridgeton 1897–1900
- Charles Cameron (physician) (1830–1921), Irish chemist, physician and writer
- Charles Duncan Cameron (1825–1870), British soldier serving as British consul in Ethiopia
- Charles Hay Cameron (1795–1880), jurist
- Charles Cameron, editor of the book Who Is Guru Maharaj Ji?
- Charles Cameron (army officer) (1779–1827), achieved the rank of lieutenant-colonel, commandant at Port Dalrymple, Tasmania
- Charles R. Cameron (1875–1946), member of the United States Foreign Service
- Charles Cameron of Lochiel (c. 1747–1776), Scottish soldier
