= Philip Kington =

English businessman, landowner, and cricketer (1832-1892)

Personal information
- Full name: Philip Oliphant Kington
- Born: 17 December 1832; Clifton, Bristol, England
- Died: 2 July 1892 (aged 59); Datchet, Buckinghamshire, England
- Batting: Unknown
- Relatives: William Kington senior (brother); William Kington junior (nephew); Beresford Baker (brother-in-law)

Domestic team information
- Years: Team
- 1855/56: Victoria

Career statistics
Competition	First-class
Matches	1
Runs scored	12
Batting average	12.00
100s/50s	–/–
Top score	12*
Catches/stumpings	–/–
- Source: Cricinfo, 21 November 2022

Philip Oliphant Kington (17 December 1832 – 2 July 1892) was an English businessman and landowner who inherited a Scottish clan chiefdom and also played a single first-class cricket game in Australia. From 1867, when he inherited Ardblair Castle in Scotland from his maternal Oliphant relatives, he took the triple-barrelled name "Kington-Blair-Oliphant". He was born at Clifton, Bristol and died at Datchet, then in Berkshire, now in Buckinghamshire.

Kington was the son of Thomas Kington of Charlton House, Wraxall in north Somerset; he was educated at Harrow School and in 1851 he matriculated at Trinity College, Cambridge, although there is no record that he completed a degree at Cambridge University. He played cricket at Harrow, and appeared in the Eton v Harrow match in 1851, but there is no evidence that he played at all at Cambridge.

In January 1855, he was named as one of the founding "resident members" of the new Melbourne, Australia branch of Miles and Kington, the family firm and a Bristol-based company of "General Agents and Commission Merchants", alongside William Augustus Mackworth, who had earlier played first-class cricket for Cambridge University and Manchester Cricket Club. Both Mackworth and Kington were elected members of the Melbourne Chamber of Commerce in May 1855. Kington was also elected to the committee of the Melbourne Cricket Club in October 1855.

The big match of the 1855/56 cricket season in Melbourne was a projected first game against a team from Sydney; this was later expanded to a match between the two colonies of Victoria and New South Wales and Kington was one of five Melbourne Cricket Club players selected for the Victoria team. The match, later regarded as first-class, was very low scoring; Kington was one of only three Victoria players to reach double figures in the game, scoring 12 not out in the first innings, but being out for 0 in the second – he also kept wicket in the second New South Wales innings.

Kington remained with the Melbourne Cricket Club the following year but then appears to have returned to England; he is recorded in a minor match in the 1858 season and then in others across the 1860s, but he did not play first-class cricket again. He inherited Ardblair Castle in 1867 and with it responsibilities within a branch of Clan Oliphant; by the time of his death in 1892, however, he was living at Datchet Lodge, Datchet. He left £21,000 in his will and was buried at Wraxall.
