= John Earle =

John or Jonathan Earle may refer to:

- John Earle (bishop) (c. 1601–1665), English bishop
- John Earle (divine) (1749–1818), English Catholic divine
- John B. Earle (1766–1836), United States Representative from South Carolina
- John Milton Earle (1794–1874), American businessman and abolitionist
- John Earle (professor) (1824–1903), British Anglo-Saxon language scholar
- John Earle (Australian politician) (1865–1932), first Labor Premier of Tasmania
- Jack Earle (1906–1952), American silent film actor
- John Earle (musician) (1944–2008), Irish saxophone player
- John Earle (American football) (born 1968), Former NFL/CFL player
- John Earle Sullivan (born 1995), activist and photojournalist
- Jonathan F. Earle, Florida academic who won the NSF Presidential Award for Excellence in Science, Mathematics and Engineering Mentoring
- Jonathan H. Earle, Louisiana academic specialising in the history of the antebellum United States

== See also ==
- John Earl (disambiguation)
- Jonathan Earle Arnold (1814–1869), American lawyer and politician
