= John Earl =

John Earl may refer to:

- John Earl (cricketer, born 1788)
- John Earl (cricketer, born 1822)

== See also ==
- John Earle (disambiguation)
