= Beresford Baker =

Irish cricketer and British Army officer

Personal information
- Full name: William Beresford Baker
- Born: 31 October 1847; Ireland
- Died: 20 February 1933 (aged 85); Dover, Kent, England
- Batting: Unknown
- Relatives: Philip Kington (brother-in-law); William Kington (brother-in-law); William Miles Kington (nephew)

Domestic team information
- Years: Team
- 1895: Marylebone Cricket Club

Career statistics
Competition	First-class
Matches	1
Runs scored	33
Batting average	16.50
100s/50s	–/–
Top score	30
Catches/stumpings	–/–
- Source: Cricinfo, 12 November 2020

William Beresford Baker (31 October 1847 – 20 February 1933) was an Irish first-class cricketer and British Army officer.

Baker was born in Ireland in October 1847. He was commissioned in the British Army when he purchased the rank of ensign in the Royal Scots in October 1868. He purchased the rank of lieutenant in June 1871, before being promoted to captain in November 1877. Baker made a single appearance in first-class cricket when he played for the Marylebone Cricket Club (MCC) against Dublin University at Dublin in 1895. Batting twice in the match, he was dismissed for 30 runs in the MCC first innings by Ernest Ensor, while in their second innings he was run out for 3.

He had married Isabella Wilson, of Birmingham, in 1877. The couple later settled in Dover, where they founded the Day Star Mission, a Christian missionary which educated and helped the disadvantaged in the town. Baker died at Dover in February 1933. His brothers-in-law included the cricketers Philip and William Kington, while his nephew was William Miles Kington.
