= Braybrook =

Braybrook or Braybrooke may refer to:

- Braybrooke (surname)
- Baron Braybrooke
- Braybrooke, a village in Northamptonshire, England
- Braybrooke, an electoral ward of Hastings, England
- Braybrook, a suburb of Melbourne, Victoria, Australia
