= Whitlow =

Whitlow may refer to:

- Whitlow (infection), an infection of the tip of the finger
- Whitlow (surname), a family name
- Whitlow (given name), a given name
- Draba verna, a small plant of the Brassicaceae family named Common Whitlow-grass, its close relatives also being named Whitlow-grasses.
