= James Rowley =

James Rowley may refer to:

- James Joseph Rowley (1908–1992), head of the United States Secret Service
- James Rowley (cricketer) (1830–1870), English cricketer
