= Henry Brandt =

English cricketer and clergyman

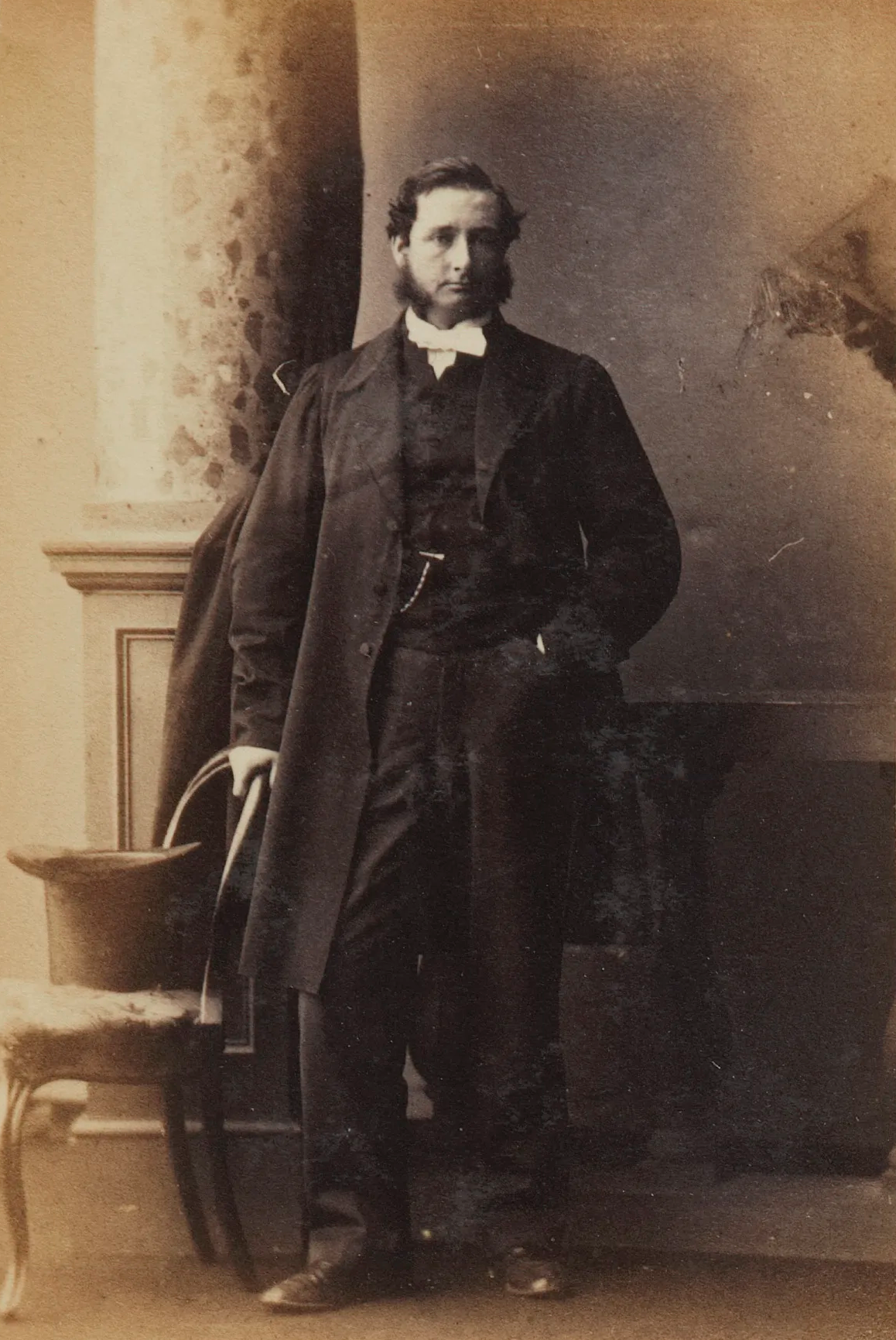
- Portrait by Camille Silvy, 1860

Personal information
- Full name: Henry Brandt
- Born: 20 August 1828; Salford, Lancashire, England
- Died: 31 March 1898 (aged 69); Cockington, Devon, England
- Batting: Unknown

Career statistics
Competition	First-class
Matches	1
Runs scored	20
Batting average	10.00
100s/50s	0/0
Top score	13
Catches/stumpings	0/–
- Source: Cricinfo, 30 December 2019

Henry Brandt (20 August 1828 – 31 March 1898) was an English first-class cricketer and clergyman.

The son of Robert Brandt, he was born at Salford in August 1828. He was educated at Rugby School, before going up to Trinity College, Cambridge. While studying at Trinity, he took part in The Boat Race of 1852, in addition to gaining a rowing blue. After leaving Cambridge, Brandt was ordained in the Church of England and served as the canon of St Paul's, Bedford from 1852–54. In 1854, he made a single appearance in first-class cricket for Manchester against Sheffield at the Botanical Gardens, Manchester. Batting twice in the match, he was dismissed for 13 runs in Manchester's first-innings by John Berry, while in their second-innings he was dismissed 7 runs by E. B. Kaye. He was a priest at Ely in 1854, before serving as the rector of Burrough on the Hill, Leicestershire from 1855–73 and from 1873–83, he was the vicar of Elworth, Cheshire. Brandt later retired to Cockington in Devon, where he died in March 1898. (Note: Alumni Cantabrigienses records Brandt's date of death 14 July 1899, whereas ESPNcricinfo and Cricket Archive both concur with 31 March 1898)
