= Charles Langton =

English cricketer

Personal information
- Full name: Charles Langton
- Born: 11 July 1823; Liverpool, Lancashire, England
- Died: 18 November 1900 (aged 77); Aigburth, Lancashire, England
- Batting: Unknown
- Bowling: Unknown

Domestic team information
- Years: Team
- 1849: Lancashire

Career statistics
Competition	First-class
Matches	2
Runs scored	21
Batting average	5.25
100s/50s	–/–
Top score	7
Balls bowled	36
Wickets	3
Bowling average	24.00
5 wickets in innings	–
10 wickets in match	–
Best bowling	2/?
Catches/stumpings	1/–
- Source: Cricinfo, 2 April 2019

Charles Langton (11 July 1823 – 18 November 1900) was an English first-class cricketer.

Langton was born at Liverpool and was educated at Rugby School, entering in 1837. He made two appearances in first-class cricket for Lancashire against Yorkshire in 1849, played at Sheffield and Manchester. He scored 21 runs in his two matches, with a high score of 7, while with the ball he took 3 wickets.

Langton ran an insurance brokerage business, based in London and Liverpool, with his company Langton Charles & Co. being liquidated in 1866. By 1875, he was involved with the Liverpool Juvenile Reformatory Association as a treasurer, assisting with administration of the reformatory school ship Akbar, alongside a reformatory farm for boys and a reformatory school for girls. He died at Aigburth in November 1900.
