= Adamthwaite =

Adamthwaite is an English toponymic surname. Notable people with this name include:

- John Adamthwaite (1810–1870), English cricketer
- Michael Adamthwaite (born 1981), Canadian actor, writer and director
