= Braybrooke (surname) =

Braybrooke is a surname. Notable people with the surname include:

- Andrew Braybrook (born 1960), British video game programmer
- David Braybrooke (1924–2013), American political philosopher
- Garnet Braybrook, Australian rugby league footballer
- Geoff Braybrooke (1935–2013), New Zealand politician
- Gerard Braybrooke I (c. 1332 – 1403), English politician
- Henry Braybrooke (1869–1935), English colonial administrator and cricketer
- Patrick Braybrooke (1894–1956), English literary critic
- Reynold Braybrooke (c. 1356 – 1405), English politician
- Robert Braybrooke (1336/7-1404), Dean of Salisbury and Bishop of London
- Stephen Braybrooke (1808–1886), English cricketer

== See also ==
- Baron Braybrooke
