= David Bleakley (cricketer) =

English cricketer

Personal information
- Full name: David Bleakley
- Born: c. 1817; Pilkington, Lancashire, England
- Died: 1882 (aged 64/65); Bury, Lancashire, England
- Batting: Unknown
- Bowling: Unknown

Career statistics
Competition	First-class
Matches	5
Runs scored	68
Batting average	6.80
100s/50s	–/–
Top score	11
Balls bowled	24
Wickets	0
Bowling average	–
5 wickets in innings	–
10 wickets in match	–
Best bowling	–
Catches/stumpings	4/–
- Source: Cricinfo, 17 November 2019

David Bleakley (c. 1817 – 1882) was an English first-class cricketer.

Born in Lancashire at Pilkington in 1817, Bleakley made his debut in first-class cricket for Manchester against Sheffield at Sheffield in 1852. He made a second first-class appearance for Manchester against Sheffield in 1854, with the match played at Manchester. He later appeared in three first-class matches for the Gentlemen of the North against the Gentlemen of the South in 1859–60. In his five first-class matches, Bleakley scored 68 runs at an average of 6.80, with a high score of 11. He died at Bury in 1882.
