= William Kington (Europeans cricketer) =

English cricketer and British Army officer

Personal information
- Full name: William Miles Kington
- Born: 25 April 1876; Cheltenham, Gloucestershire, England
- Died: 20 October 1914 (aged 38); Zonnebeke, West Flanders, Belgium
- Batting: Unknown
- Relatives: William Kington (father); Philip Kington (uncle); Beresford Baker (uncle)

Domestic team information
- Years: Team
- 1911/12: Europeans

Career statistics
| Competition | First-class |
|---|---|
| Matches | 1 |
| Runs scored | 4 |
| Batting average | 2.00 |
| 100s/50s | –/– |
| Top score | 3 |
| Catches/stumpings | 1/– |
- Source: Cricinfo, 21 November 2022

William Miles Kington DSO (25 April 1876 – 20 October 1914) was an English first-class cricketer and British Army officer.

The son of the cricketer William Kington, he was born at Cheltenham in April 1876. He was educated at Glenalmond College, before attending the Royal Military College, Sandhurst. He graduated from there into the Royal Welch Fusiliers as a second lieutenant in September 1896, with promotion to lieutenant following in March 1899. Kington served in the Second Boer War, where he was present at the Relief of Ladysmith and the Battle of Colenso. He was awarded the Distinguished Service Order in October 1902, having previously been mentioned in dispatches in September 1901. In August 1902, he was seconded for service with the South African Constabulary, an appointment which lasted until 1904. He was promoted to captain in April 1906, having spent the period since his service in South Africa as an adjutant to Volunteer and Territorial Battalions.

While serving in British India, Kington made a single appearance in first-class cricket for the Europeans in 1911 against the Parsees at Poona in the Bombay Presidency Match. Batting twice in the match, he was dismissed for 3 runs by M. D. Parekh in the Europeans first innings, while in their second innings he was dismissed for a single run by the same bowler. Kington served in the First World War with the Royal Welch Fusiliers, travelling with them to France in August 1914. He was killed in action in October 1914, while attacking a German position near Zonnebeke in Belgium, during the course of which he was struck by a shell and killed instantly. His body was never recovered, with him being commemorated on the Menin Gate. Kington was survived by his wife, Edith, and their son. His uncle's, Philip Kington and Beresford Baker, both played first-class cricket.
