= George Cooke (cricketer) =

English cricketer (1826–1862)

Personal information
- Full name: George Frederick Cooke
- Born: 1 August 1826; Manchester, Lancashire, England
- Died: 25 March 1862 (aged 35); Edinburgh, Midlothian, Scotland
- Batting: Unknown
- Bowling: Unknown

Domestic team information
- Years: Team
- 1849–1851: Lancashire
- 1852–1853: Marylebone Cricket Club

Career statistics
Competition	First-class
Matches	18
Runs scored	356
Batting average	10.47
100s/50s	–/–
Top score	40
Balls bowled	92
Wickets	5
Bowling average	8.00
5 wickets in innings	–
10 wickets in match	–
Best bowling	3/12
Catches/stumpings	7/–
- Source: Cricinfo, 25 July 2019

George Frederick Cooke (1 August 1826 – 25 March 1862) was an English first-class cricketer.

Cooke was born at Manchester in August 1826 and was educated at Rugby School. He made his debut in first-class cricket for Manchester against Sheffield at Manchester in 1848. Cooke played first-class cricket on eighteen occasions from 1848–58. In addition to playing for Manchester, Cooke also appeared for Lancashire and the Marylebone Cricket Club, as well as representing four 'gentlemen' teams: the Gentlemen of England, the Gentlemen of the South, the Gentlemen of the North, and the Gentlemen of Marylebone Cricket Club. In his eighteen matches he scored 356 runs at an average of 10.47, with a high score of 40. With the ball, he took 5 wickets with best figures of 3 for 12. Cooke also stood as an umpire in one first-class match in 1849. He died at Edinburgh in March 1862.
