= Arthur Girling =

English cricketer and umpire

Personal information
- Full name: Arthur Girling
- Born: 1807; Burton upon Trent, Staffordshire, England
- Died: June 1849 (aged 41/42); Manchester, Lancashire, England
- Batting: Unknown
- Bowling: Unknown

Domestic team information
- Years: Team
- 1845–1848: Manchester
- 1841: North

Umpiring information
- FC umpired: 2 (1840–1841)

Career statistics
Competition	First-class
Matches	8
Runs scored	140
Batting average	9.33
100s/50s	0/0
Top score	32
Balls bowled	458
Wickets	34
Bowling average	11.05
5 wickets in innings	3
10 wickets in match	1
Best bowling	6/32
Catches/stumpings	5/–
- Source: Cricinfo, 9 September 2019

Arthur Girling (1807 – June 1849) was an English first-class cricketer and umpire.

Girling was born at Burton upon Trent in 1807. He made his debut in first-class cricket for the North against the Marylebone Cricket Club (MCC) at Lord's in 1841, with Girling also featuring in the return fixture at Burton-on-Trent. He next played first-class cricket in 1845, when he appeared for Manchester against Yorkshire at Manchester. He played first-class cricket for Manchester until 1848, making six appearances. Playing as a bowler for Manchester, he took a total of 34 wickets at an average of 11.05, with best figures of 6 for 32. These figures came against Sheffield in 1848, a match in which he took two five-wicket hauls. He also stood as an umpire in two first-class matches in 1840 and 1841. Girling died at Manchester in June 1849.
