= Wicklow (disambiguation) =

Wicklow is a town in the Greater Dublin Area of Ireland.

Wicklow may also refer to:

- County Wicklow, Ireland
  - Wicklow County Council, formed 1899
- Wicklow GAA; in gaelic football, hurling and camogie
- Wicklow, New Brunswick, eastern Canada
  - Wicklow Parish, New Brunswick, a wider area
- Wicklow, Ontario, central Canada

== Constituencies ==
The current parliamentary constituency bearing the county's name is:

- Wicklow (Dáil constituency), a seat constituency represented in Dáil Éireann since 1923

The previous constituencies were:

=== Until 1800 ===
- Wicklow (Parliament of Ireland constituency)
- County Wicklow (Parliament of Ireland constituency)

=== 1801–1885 ===
- County Wicklow (UK Parliament constituency)

=== 1885–1922 ===
- East Wicklow, a single seat UK constituency used for election to the United Kingdom Parliament, but whose MP in 1918 took his seat instead as a TD in the first Dáil Éireann
- West Wicklow, a single seat UK constituency used for elections to the United Kingdom Parliament, but whose MP in 1918 took his seat instead as a TD in the first Dáil Éireann

=== 1921–1923 ===
- Kildare–Wicklow, a 5-seat constituency represented in Dáil Éireann 1921–1923

== See also ==
- Wicklow Mountains, eastern Ireland
  - Wicklow Way
  - Wicklow Gap
- Whitlow (disambiguation)
