= Thomas Heighes =

English cricketer

Personal information
- Full name: Thomas Heighes
- Born: 2 June 1825; Selborne, Hampshire, England
- Died: 29 December 1882 (aged 57); Belfast, Ireland

Career statistics
Competition	First-class
Matches	3
Runs scored	15
Batting average	3.75
100s/50s	0/0
Top score	7
Balls bowled	232
Wickets	7
Bowling average	8.85
5 wickets in innings	0
10 wickets in match	0
Best bowling	4/20
Catches/stumpings	4/–
- Source: Cricinfo, 29 September 2014

Thomas Heighes (2 June 1825 – 29 December 1882) was an English first-class cricketer, active 1851–57, who played for Manchester Cricket Club and Lancashire. He was born in Selborne, Hampshire and died in Belfast, Ireland
