= George Dallas (cricketer) =

English cricketer

Personal information
- Full name: George Frederick Dallas
- Born: 3 April 1827; Edgware, Hertfordshire, England
- Died: 1 February 1888 (aged 60); Huddersfield, Yorkshire, England
- Nickname: Fred
- Batting: Unknown

Domestic team information
- Years: Team
- 1849: Lancashire
- 1850: Yorkshire

Career statistics
Competition	First-class
Matches	3
Runs scored	54
Batting average	13.50
100s/50s	–/–
Top score	31
Catches/stumpings	2/–
- Source: Cricinfo, 25 July 2019

Lieutenant Colonel George Frederick Dallas (3 April 1827 – 1 February 1888) was an English first-class cricketer and army officer. Serving in the British Army, he fought in the Crimean War, Second Opium War, and Indian Mutiny, mostly as aide de camp to Robert Garrett. He retired in 1875, having been on half-pay since 1862.

== Career ==
The son of Captain Robert William Dallas and his wife Lucy née Davidson, Dallas was born in Edgware, Hertfordshire, on 3 April 1827. He was educated firstly at Mr Allfred's Preparatory School in Tunbridge Wells, and then at Harrow School from January 1842. Playing cricket for Harrow, he played in two matches at Lord's; one against Eton College and the other against Winchester College, both of which were victories. Dallas left school in 1844, and purchased a commission on 16 May 1845 as an ensign in the 46th Regiment of Foot (commanded by a family friend), before being promoted to the rank of lieutenant in April 1848. Prior to this he had served in his regiments depot battalion, joining the main portion of the 46th when it returned from duty in Halifax, Nova Scotia, on 8 May. He made his debut in first-class cricket for the Gentlemen of Kent against Cambridge University at Canterbury in the same year. He made two further first-class appearances, playing for Lancashire against Yorkshire in 1849, and for Yorkshire against an All England Eleven in 1850. While doing so Dallas continued in the army, serving in Liverpool, Chester, Hull, Preston, and Manchester, before in 1852 sailing with the 46th to Belfast. By the end of the year he was stationed at Kilkenny, before the regiment returned to England in 1854 to serve at Windsor.

While stationed at Windsor one subaltern of the regiment attacked another after a severe bout of bullying, and both were court martialled. The subsequent public proceedings cast the regiment in an extremely poor light, and many officers were incriminated in the scandal, and Dallas was one of two described by another officer as "the best and only good fellows among them". The 46th were expected to take part in the Crimean War, but the confusion surrounding the courts martial meant the regiment was unable to travel as one unit, and they were split into three for the purposes of travel. Dallas was given command of the smallest of these groups, leaving for the war on 9 August to serve as guard of honour to Lieutenant-General Sir George Cathcart, commander of the 4th Division. Dallas saw action at Alma, Balaclava, Inkerman and the Siege of Sevastopol. During the course of the war he purchased the rank of captain in September 1854, as well as serving as the aide-de-camp to General Garrett. He wrote an eyewitness account of the war, consisting of 127 letters. Dallas returned to England on 5 August 1856 as a brevet major, still serving as ADC to Garrett, who was known as "General Chaos", and quickly afterwards moved with the general to serve at Gibraltar. For his services in the war he received the Crimea Medal with four clasps, the Turkish Crimea Medal, and was created a Knight of the Legion of Honour. He was also made a member of the Order of the Medjidie, 5th Class, by the Ottoman Empire in March 1858.

Dallas was still serving with Garrett at Gibraltar when the Second Opium War began. Garrett was given command of the First Brigade to fight in the war, and Dallas sailed with him in April 1857. Dallas arrived at Hong Kong on 24 May, and on 1 June fought at the Battle of Fatshan Creek as a volunteer on board the gunboat HMS Haughty. While Garrett and his staff had made it to China, his brigade never did, as they were diverted to India upon the start of the Indian Mutiny. Garrett was then dispatched to India as well, and Dallas left with the rest of the staff for Calcutta on 19 September. They reached India later in the month, and Garrett was given command of the garrison at Umballah. Dallas arrived there in February 1858, and saw no action during the mutiny. He stayed on Garrett's staff until November 1861 when he returned to England, purchasing his full majority in October 1862 and going on half pay. Around this time he also started a family, marrying Maria Louisa Taylor of Strensham Court. They would go on to have three daughters and a son. Dallas was promoted to the rank of lieutenant colonel in January 1868, still on half pay. He retired from active service in March 1875 by selling his commission, and died at Huddersfield on 1 February 1888, at the age of 60.
