= George Wigzell =

English cricketer (1812–1875)

George Wigzell (6 May 1812 – 1875) was an English first-class cricketer active 1849–60 who played for Lancashire as organised by Manchester Cricket Club; and for Kent. He was born in Sevenoaks and died in Bonham, Fannin County, Texas. He played in eleven first-class matches, taking 42 wickets.

== Bibliography ==
- Carlaw, Derek (2020). Kent County Cricketers, A to Z: Part One (1806–1914) (PDF). Cardiff: ACS.
