= Burton-on-Trent Cricket Ground =

Cricket ground in Burton-on-Trent, England

Ground information
- Location: Burton-on-Trent, Staffordshire
- Establishment: 1840 (first recorded match)

Team information
North	(1840-1841)
- As of 15 August 2010; Source: Ground profile

Burton-on-Trent Cricket Ground (exact name unknown) was a cricket ground in Burton-on-Trent, Staffordshire. The first recorded match on the ground was in 1840, when the North played the Marylebone Cricket Club in the grounds first first-class match. The following year the ground held its second and final first-class match when the North again played the Marlybone Cricket Club.

The final recorded match on the County Ground came in 1848 and saw Burton-on-Trent play Manchester Cricket Club. The exact location of the ground remains unknown, although some sources such as Cricinfo believe the ground may in fact be the Town Ground.
