= Daniel Rowland (cricketer) =

English cricketer

Daniel Rowland (c. 1826 – 1 October 1891) was an English cricketer active from 1849 to 1868 who played for Lancashire. He was born and died in Bury. A member of Manchester Cricket Club, he appeared in two first-class matches, scoring nine runs.
