= George Bigge =

English cricketer and British Army officer

Personal information
- Full name: George Orde Bigge
- Born: 13 January 1869; Ferozepore, Punjab, British India
- Died: 26 March 1935 (aged 66); Stone in Oxney, Kent, England
- Batting: Right-handed
- Bowling: Right-arm medium
- Relatives: Henry Braybrooke (brother-in-law)

Domestic team information
- Years: Team
- 1898: Marylebone Cricket Club
- 1898–1903: Hertfordshire

Career statistics
Competition	First-class
Matches	1
Runs scored	12
Batting average	6.00
100s/50s	–/–
Top score	11
Catches/stumpings	–/–
- Source: Cricinfo, 3 July 2019

George Orde Bigge OBE (13 January 1869 – 26 March 1935) was an English first-class cricketer and British Army officer. Bigge served with the Royal Engineers from 1887 to 1920, seeing action in both the Second Boer War and the First World War. He also played first-class cricket for the Marylebone Cricket Club.

== Life and military career ==
The son of Major Thomas Scovell Charles Bigge and his wife, Ellen Bigge, he was born at Ferozepore in British India. He graduated from the Royal Military Academy in July 1887, entering into the Royal Engineers as a second lieutenant. He was promoted to the rank of lieutenant in July 1890, with promotion to the rank of captain in April 1898. Bigge made a single appearance in first-class cricket for the Marylebone Cricket Club (MCC) against Derbyshire at Lord's in June 1898. Batting twice in the match, he was dismissed in the MCC first-innings for 11 runs by George Davidson, while in their second-innings he was dismissed by the same bowler for a single run. He also made his debut in minor counties cricket for Hertfordshire in July 1898. He played minor counties cricket for Hertfordshire until 1903, making eleven appearances.

He served during the Second Boer War and was decorated with the Queen's South Africa Medal. He was promoted to the rank of major in February 1906. After serving in the First World War, he held the rank of lieutenant colonel by October 1919. In December 1919 he was made an OBE, before retiring from active service in June 1920. He died in March 1935 at Stone in Oxney, Kent. He was survived by his wife, Eliza Augusta Bigge, whom he had married at Rye in 1906. His brother-in-law, Henry Braybrooke, was also a first-class cricketer.
