= Thomas Blain =

English cricketer

Personal information
- Full name: Thomas Goad Blain
- Born: 11 March 1827; West Derby, (Liverpool), Lancashire, England
- Died: 10 March 1878 (aged 50); Chislehurst, Kent, England

Domestic team information
- Years: Team
- 1851: Lancashire
- 1852: Manchester

Career statistics
Competition	FC
Matches	3
Runs scored	28
Batting average	5.60
100s/50s	0/0
Top score	10
Catches/stumpings	1/–
- Source: Cricinfo, 4 April 2015

Thomas Goad Blain (11 March 1827 – 10 March 1878) was an English cricketer active in the early 1850s, playing in three first-class cricket matches.

Blain made his debut in first-class cricket for a Lancashire XI in 1851 against a Yorkshire XI at the Botanical Gardens in Manchester. The following season he played a further two first-class matches for Manchester against the Marylebone Cricket Club at Lord's and against Sheffield at the Botanical Gardens. He scored a total of 28 runs in his three matches, with a high score of 10.

He died in Chislehurst, Kent on 10 March 1878, a day shy of his 51st birthday.
