= Edward Wright (Lancashire cricketer) =

English cricketer

Personal information
- Full name: Edward Wright

Domestic team information
- Years: Team
- 1844–1848: Manchester Cricket Club

Career statistics
Competition	First-class
Matches	7
Runs scored	88
Batting average	7.33
100s/50s	0/0
Top score	23
Catches/stumpings	3/–
- Source: Cricinfo, 19 March 2015

Edward Wright (dates of birth and death unknown) was an English cricketer who made seven appearances in first-class cricket.

Wright made his debut in first-class cricket for Manchester Cricket Club in 1844 against a Yorkshire XI at Moss Lane. He played a further six first-class matches until 1849. He scored a total of 88 runs in his seven matches, with a high score of 23.
