= John Buttery (cricketer) =

English cricketer

John Buttery (21 December 1814 – 5 December 1873) was an English first-class cricketer active 1843–52 who played for Nottinghamshire and Manchester. He was born and died in Nottingham.
