= The Boat Race 1852 =

11th Boat Race
- Date: 3 April 1852
- Winner: Oxford
- Margin of victory: 9 lengths
- Winning time: 21 minutes 36 seconds
- Overall record (Cambridge–Oxford): 7–4
- Umpire: C. J. Selwyn

The 11th Boat Race took place on the River Thames on 3 April 1852. Typically held annually, the event is a side-by-side rowing race between crews from the Universities of Oxford and Cambridge. Former Cambridge cox Thomas Selby Egan coached Oxford, the first time that either crew had been trained by a member of the opposing university. The race was won by Oxford, their first Boat Race victory at Easter, who triumphed over Cambridge by nine lengths.

== Background ==
The Boat Race is a side-by-side rowing competition between the University of Oxford (sometimes referred to as the "Dark Blues") and the University of Cambridge (sometimes referred to as the "Light Blues"). The race was first held in 1829, and since 1845 has taken place on the 4.2-mile (6.8 km) Championship Course on the River Thames in southwest London. Oxford went into the race as reigning champions, having defeated Cambridge, who were disqualified, in the previous race held in December 1849. Cambridge led overall with seven wins to Oxford's three.

The universities were unable to agree on a date for race in both 1850 and 1851. The challenge to race from Cambridge was received by Oxford in December 1851 and was finally accepted that a race be conducted around Easter the following year. Oxford were coached by the former Cambridge cox Thomas Selby Egan, who had represented the Light Blues in the 1836, 1839 and 1840 races, in protest at the use of watermen as Boat Race coaches. Oxford had prevented their use since 1841 but Cambridge would not do so until 1873 and were coached by the Thames waterman and world champion sculler Bob Coombes. It was the first time a crew was coached by a member of the other university.

The umpire for the race was Charles Jasper Selwyn and the starter was Edward Searle.

== Crews ==
Three members of the Oxford crew had participated in the previous meeting of the universities in December 1849, Houghton, Joseph William Chitty and the cox, Cotton. None of the Cambridge crew had Boat Race experience. The Cambridge crew weighed an average of 11 st 8.5 lb (73.5 kg), 2 pounds (0.9 kg) per rower more than their opponents.

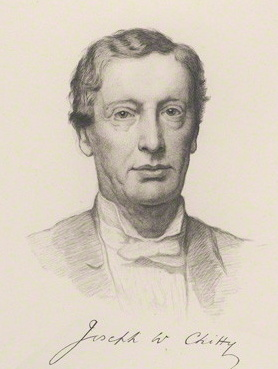
Joseph William Chitty rowed at stroke for Oxford.

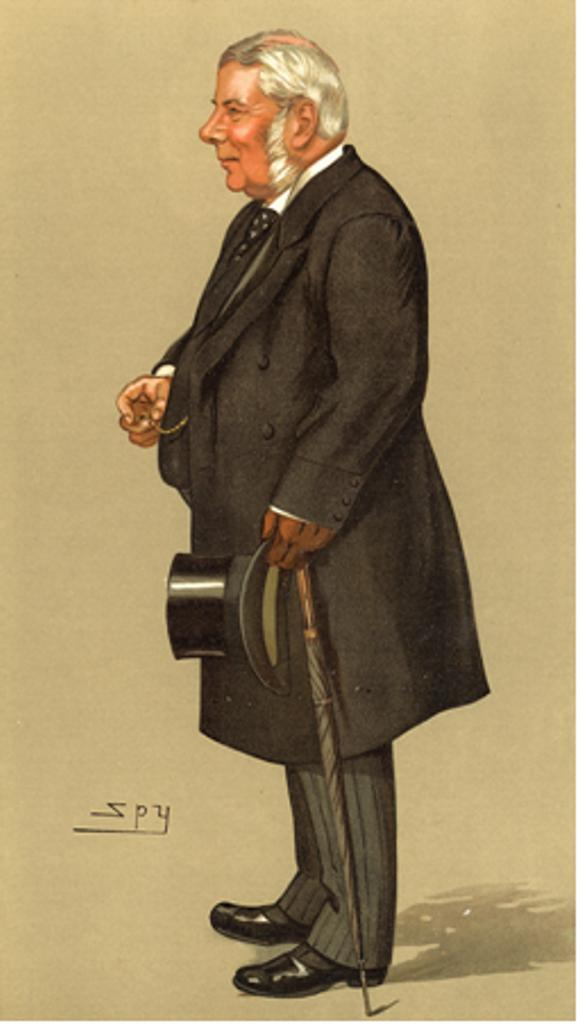
Edward Macnaghten, Baron Macnaghten occupied the bow seat for Cambridge.

Seat	Cambridge			Oxford		
Seat	Name	College	Weight	Name	College	Weight
Bow	E. Macnaghten	1st Trinity	11 st 0 lb	O. K. Prescott	Brasenose	10 st 0 lb
2	H. Brandt	1st Trinity	11 st 5 lb	R. Greenall (P)	Brasenose	10 st 12 lb
3	H. E. Tuckey	Lady Margaret Boat Club	11 st 3 lb	Philip Henry Nind	Christ Church	11 st 2 lb
4	H. B. Foord	1st Trinity	12 st 6 lb	Reginald John Buller	Balliol	12 st 4 lb
5	E. Hawley	Sidney Sussex	12 st 5 lb	Henry Denne	University	12 st 8 lb
6	W. S. Longmore	Sidney Sussex	11 st 4 lb	W. Houghton	Brasenose	11 st 8 lb
7	W. A. Norris	3rd Trinity	11 st 9 lb	W. O. Meade King	Pembroke	11 st 11 lb
Stroke	Frederick Wm. Johnson (P)	3rd Trinity	11 st 8 lb	J. W. Chitty	Balliol	11 st 7 lb
Cox	C. H. Crosse	Gonville & Caius	9 st 7 lb	R. W. Cotton	Christ Church	9 st 2 lb
Source: (P) – boat club president

== Race ==
The Championship Course along which the Boat Race is conducted

Cambridge won the toss and elected to start on the Surrey side of the river, handing the Middlesex station to Oxford. The race started under Searle's command at 1.45 p.m. with Oxford taking a slight lead. On the approach to Hammersmith Bridge the gap was closing and Oxford passed through the central arch. Cambridge, following Coombe's advice, opted to shoot the bridge towards the Surrey side and in doing so "lost the stream" and allowed Oxford to extend their lead. By Barnes Bridge the lead was around four lengths, and Oxford kept increasing their margin, winning by nine lengths in a time of 21 minutes 36 seconds. It was their second consecutive victory and took the overall record to 7–4 in favour of Cambridge.
