= John Earl (cricketer, born 1822) =

English cricketer

John Earl junior
Personal information
- Full name: John Henry Earl
- Born: 30 November 1822; Manchester
- Died: 5 February 1874 (aged 51); Cheetham Hill, Lancashire
- Relatives: John Earl senior (father)

Career statistics
Competition	FC
Matches	2
Runs scored	43
Batting average	10.75
100s/50s	0/0
Top score	18
Balls bowled	36
Wickets	2
Bowling average	?
5 wickets in innings	0
10 wickets in match	0
Best bowling	1/?
Catches/stumpings	0/–
- Source: CricketArchive, 6 April 2015

John Henry Earl (30 November 1822 – 5 February 1874) was an English first-class cricketer active 1849–52 who played for Manchester Cricket Club and Lancashire XIs. The son of John Earl senior, he was born in Manchester and died in Cheetham Hill, Lancashire. Earl made two appearances, his 1849 debut being against a Yorkshire XI at the Hyde Park Ground in Sheffield. His second match was in 1852 for Manchester against Sheffield at the Botanical Gardens Cricket Ground in Manchester. In his two matches, he scored a total of 43 runs, with a highest score of 18, and he took two wickets.
