= Roger Hadfield Ogden Honors College =

- The French House
- U.S. National Register of Historic Places
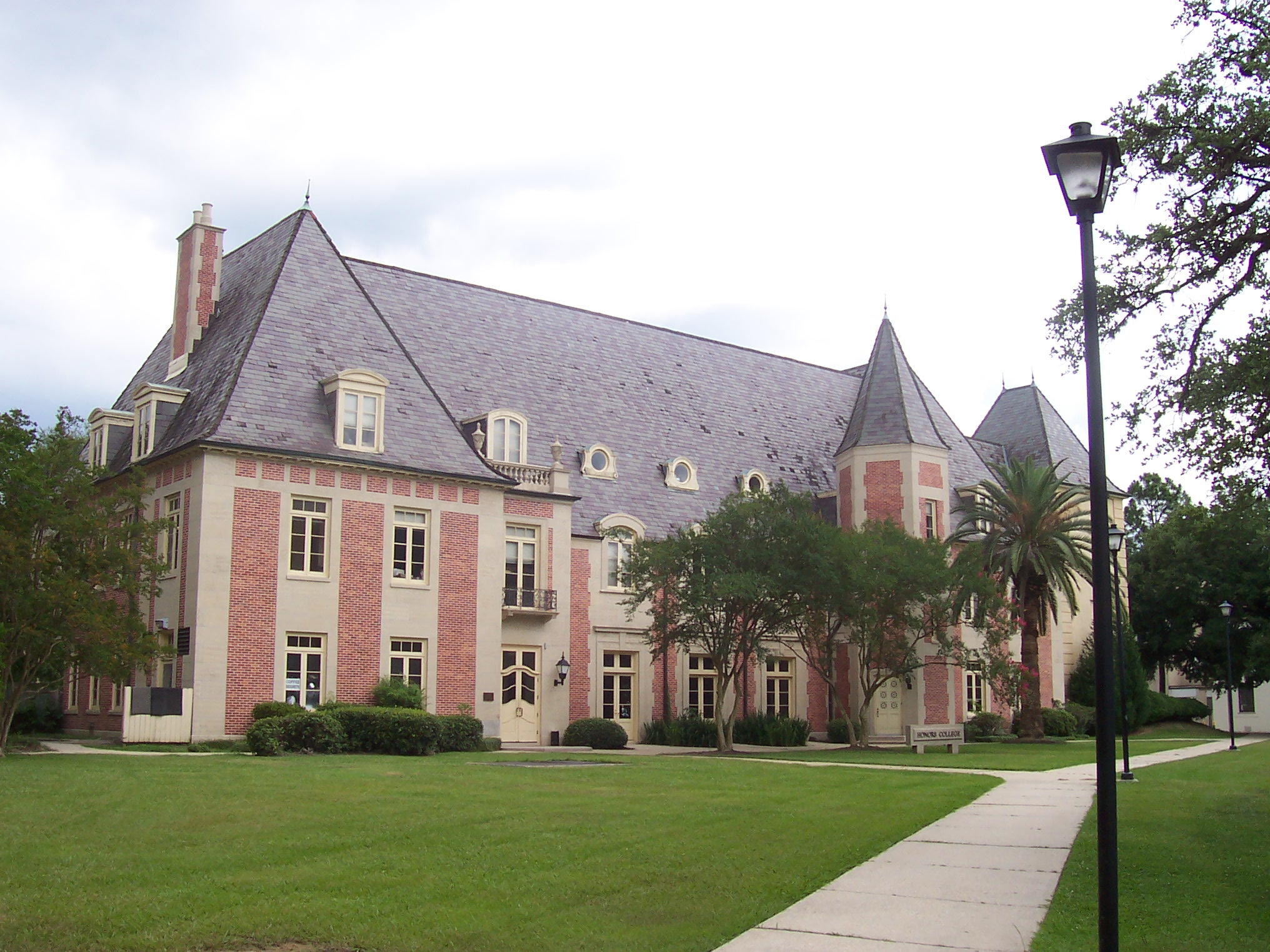
- The French House, home of the Ogden Honors College

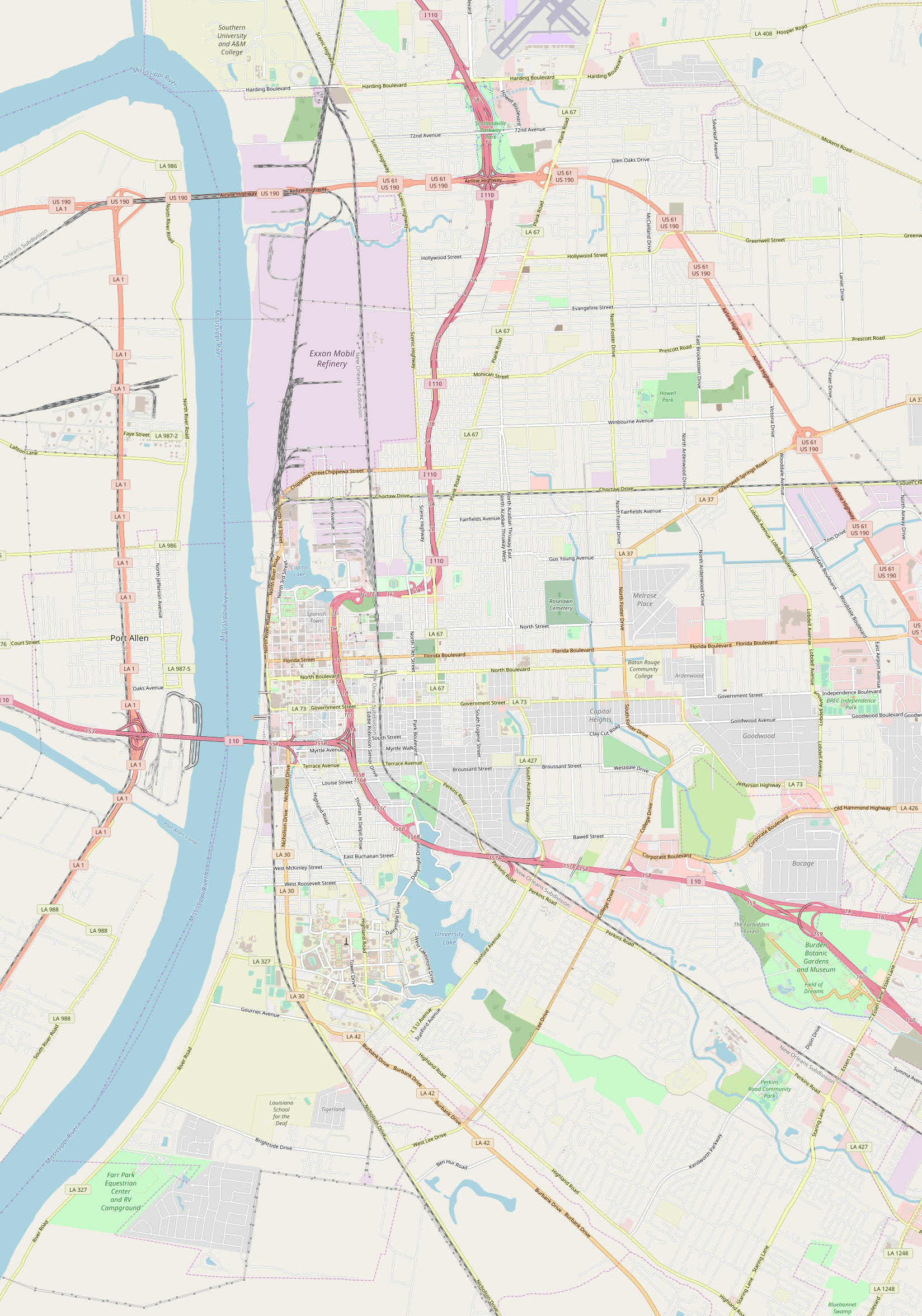
- Location within Baton Rouge
- Location: On Louisiana State University Campus, corner of South Campus Drive and Highland Road, Baton Rouge, Louisiana
- Coordinates: 30°24′40″N 91°10′32″W
- Area: 3 acres (1.2 ha)
- Built: 1935
- Architect: Weiss, Dreyfous & Seiferth
- Architectural style: Renaissance, French Renaissance
- NRHP reference No.: 82002768
- Added to NRHP: January 13, 1982

The Roger Hadfield Ogden Honors College is an academic community at Louisiana State University. Housed in the heritage-listed French House, it was founded in 1992 as the LSU Honors College, and renamed in December 2014. The college provides its students with a curriculum of seminar classes, mentoring relationships with faculty, and opportunities for undergraduate research, culminating in the Honors Thesis.

== History and setting ==
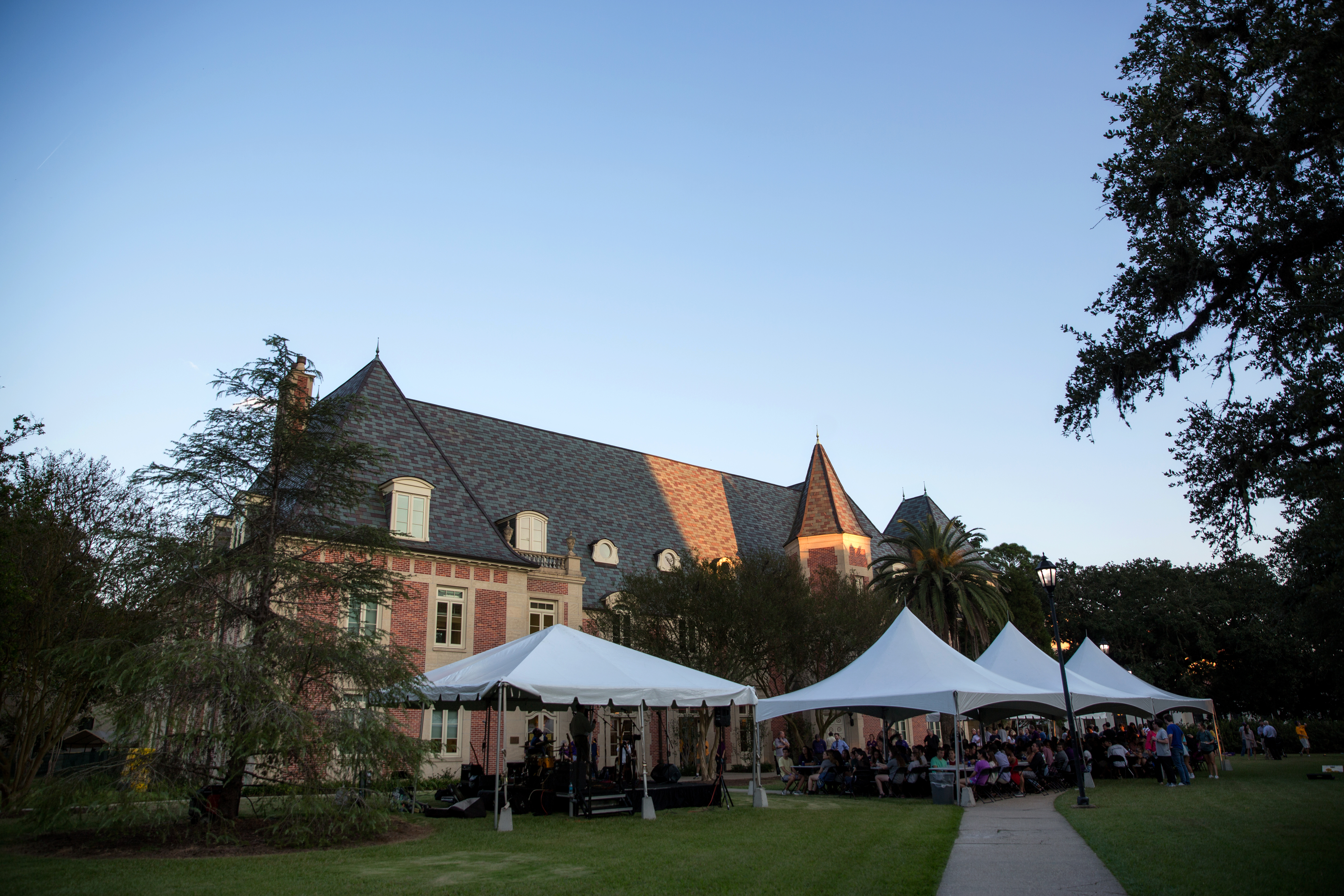
The French House on the 50th Anniversary Celebration of Honors education at LSU in 2017.

Honors education at LSU began in 1967 when professors Charles Bigger and Edward Henderson coordinated and developed a series of team-taught collaborative courses that remain the academic core of the Honors curriculum at LSU. In 1992, the LSU Board of Supervisors approved the transformation of the honors program at the university into the LSU Honors College. Bill Seay served as the college's first and only dean until 2003 when Nancy Clark assumed the role. The third and current dean is Dr. Jonathan H. Earle, who joined the university in 2014. The Honors College was initially located in the Old President's House on Highland Road. Comprising the French House, the Laville Honors House residence hall, and the 459 Dining Commons, this complete "campus within a campus" distinguishes the Ogden Honors College as one of the few honors institutions in the country with a dedicated campus specifically for the honors student body. In December 2014, LSU announced that they had received a $12 million investment from alumnus Roger Ogden, the largest unrestricted endowed gift in LSU history. Shortly after, the LSU Board of Supervisors approved the renaming of the LSU Honors College in honor of Ogden's late father and son.

=== The French House ===
In 1999, the Honors College moved into the French House, Renaissance-style chateau originally constructed as a center for intensive study of the French language, literature, and culture. The French House was dedicated on April 15, 1935, when French Ambassador André de Laboulaye traveled to Louisiana to celebrate LSU's Diamond Jubilee. The French ambassador laid the structure's cornerstone, which included a piece of wood from the original Fort de la Boulaye, the first French settlement in Louisiana. Ambassador François de Laboulaye, André de Laboulaye's son, rededicated the building on April 3, 1981. The French House remains the only non-Quadrangle LSU structure on the National Register of Historic Places. A long-anticipated $5 million renovation of the interior of the French House began in December 2014, funded through capital outlay funds allocated by former Louisiana Governor Bobby Jindal. Renovations by Baton Rouge architecture firm Tipton Associates, APAC, were completed in 2016. The 3 acres (1.2 ha) area was added to the National Register of Historic Places on January 13, 1982.

=== Laville Honors House ===
Located near the French House is the Laville Honors House, a residence hall for students enrolled in the college. The Laville Honors House includes an East Hall, West Hall, and central lobby. The East and West wings are mirror images of one another. Plans were approved by the Louisiana Board of Regents in 2008 to add 3,600 square feet (330 m^{2}) of new space and renovate 110,500 square feet (10,270 m^{2}) of existing residence hall space, which included expanding lounges and study space and providing for faculty residence on the first floor. The West Hall renovations were complete in fall 2010. The renovations of the East Hall and addition of a central lobby were completed in April 2012 at a cost of $14 million.

== Courses, undergraduate thesis, and awards ==
There are three different types of honors courses at the university. Courses offered through the Honors College are designated by the HNRS prefix and include interdisciplinary courses which generally exist as seminar-lecture pairs and feature the history, politics, philosophy, art, languages, and literature of specific civilizations or time periods. These courses are capped at 20 in order to increase student engagement. Ideally, the research that begins in an HNRS class may lead eventually to an Honors Thesis under the direction of the faculty member. Academic departments across campus also offer honors equivalent courses. Students may also choose to "Honors Option" a course by entering into a contract with a professor of an upper level course and fulfilling a set of agreed upon requirements that go beyond the expectations laid out in the course's syllabus. This modified coursework proposal provides an opportunity for upper-level students to earn Honors credit for a traditional 3000/4000 level LSU course.

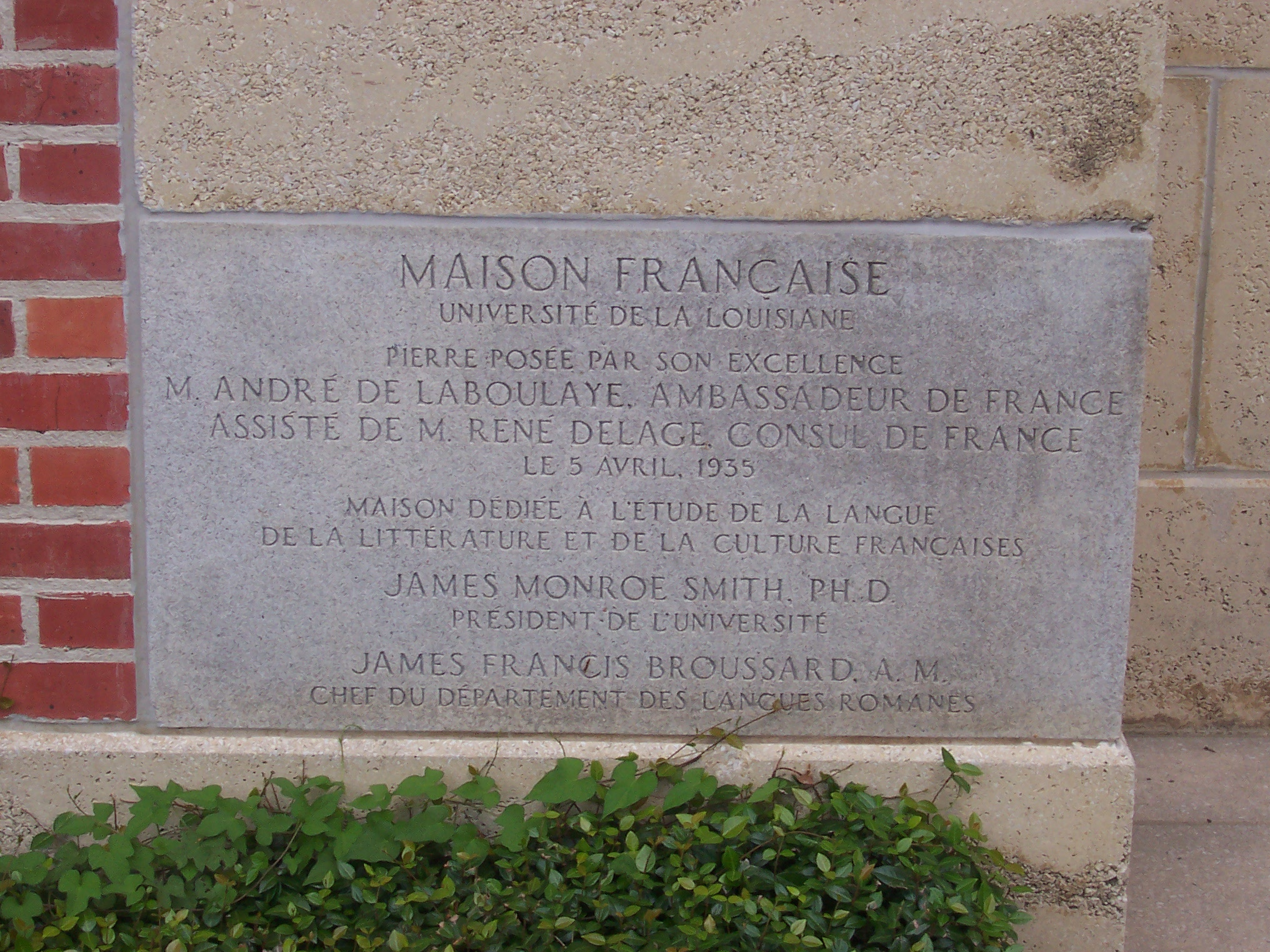
Cornerstone of the French House

Students in the college have the opportunity to complete an undergraduate thesis, graduate with College Honors, and earn two different distinctions. Sophomore Honors Distinction is bestowed upon a student who completes 20 hours or more of Honors courses by the end of the second year, maintains a 3.5 cumulative GPA in Honors courses and in all course work, and completes one Honors interdisciplinary course. Upper Division Honors Distinction can be earned by completing Honors work in courses at the 3000 level or above, including three to six hours of research, and by writing and defending an undergraduate thesis in the student's main field of study. The Honors Thesis is the capstone achievement of the Honors College curriculum, and completing one is a culminating experience for fourth year students. In the Honors Thesis students answer questions and solve problems in order to demonstrate their mastery by completing a long-term project with an expert faculty member in their chosen discipline. College Honors—a designation that appears on a student's diploma—does not require completion of Sophomore Honors Distinction, but does require 32 total hours of Honors credit, 3.5 GPA in overall, LSU, and Honors course work, 6 hours of HNRS (Honors College) credit, Senior Honors Thesis Project, and 12 hours of Honors course credit at the 3000/4000 level, adhering to Upper Division programs where they exist.

Since 2005, Ogden Honors students have been awarded with more than 100 national and international fellowships, including 18 Goldwater Scholarships, 10 Truman Scholarships, 36 NSF Graduate Research Fellowships, 17 Critical Language Scholarships, and 4 Udall Scholarships.

== Admission and enrollment ==
Although the college accepts continuing and transfer students, most incoming students enroll as college freshmen. Recommended SAT scores (EBRW+M) and GPA for prospective high school students are 1360 and 3.5 respectively. Students may also have a minimum composite score of 30 on the ACT and should complete the writing component of the SAT or ACT for consideration.

Today, the LSU Honors College has a student enrollment of about 2,000. Applications for fall 2006 reached 2,400 by December 15. The Honor College enrollment grew by 33 percent in the fall of 2007.

== See also ==
- Honors College
- National Register of Historic Places listings in East Baton Rouge Parish, Louisiana
