= Scholes Birch =

English cricketer and medical doctor

Personal information
- Full name: Scholes Butler Birch
- Born: 30 July 1826; Failsworth, Lancashire, England
- Died: 13 April 1910 (aged 83); Cheshunt, Hertfordshire, England
- Batting: Unknown
- Bowling: Unknown-arm underarm slow
- Relatives: Lea Birch (father)

Domestic team information
- Years: Team
- 1849–1851: Lancashire

Career statistics
Competition	First-class
Matches	6
Runs scored	84
Batting average	7.00
100s/50s	–/–
Top score	33
Balls bowled	104
Wickets	0
Bowling average	–
5 wickets in innings	–
10 wickets in match	–
Best bowling	–
Catches/stumpings	3/–
- Source: Cricinfo, 2 April 2019

Scholes Butler Birch (30 July 1826 – 13 April 1910) was an English first-class cricketer and medical doctor.

The son of the first-class cricketer Lea Birch, he was born at Failsworth, Lancashire and studied medicine at the University of St Andrews School of Medicine. He made his debut in first-class cricket for Manchester against Yorkshire at Manchester. He played in first-class matches for Manchester on six occasions between 1845 and 1852, including on three occasions when the matches were billed as Lancashire v Yorkshire in 1849 and 1851. Across six first-class matches, Birch scored 84 runs at an average of 7.00, with a high score of 33. He was one of the earliest members of the Free Foresters Cricket Club. He died in April 1910 at Cheshunt, Hertfordshire.
