= William Mackworth =

Trinidad-born English cricketer

William Augustus Mackworth (3 March 1825 – 4 December 1855) was a Trinidad-born English cricketer who played one first-class cricket match for Cambridge University in 1845 and another for Manchester in 1848. He was born in Trinidad where his father was high sheriff and died at St Kilda, Melbourne, Australia.

Mackworth matriculated at Trinity College, Cambridge in 1844 but it is not recorded if he took a degree. He married in Dunedin, New Zealand, in 1852. In January 1855, he was named as one of the founding "resident members" of the new Melbourne branch of Miles and Kington, a Bristol-based company of "General Agents and Commission Merchants", alongside Philip Oliphant Kington, who later played first-class cricket for Victoria. His death at the end of 1855 came "after an illness of ten days".

As a cricketer, Mackworth was a middle-order batsman; there is no record that he bowled nor is it known whether he was right- or left-handed. He achieved little in his one game for Cambridge University, but not out innings of 10 and 28 in the 1848 first-class match between Manchester and Sheffield – a forerunner of Lancashire and Yorkshire matches – enabled Manchester to win by 11 runs. He appeared for Manchester in minor matches in both 1847 and 1848.
