= Thomas Smelt =

English cricketer

Personal information
- Full name: Thomas Smelt
- Born: c. 1820; Manchester, Lancashire, England
- Died: 1893 (aged 72/73); Lancashire, England
- Batting: Unknown

Career statistics
| Competition | First-class |
|---|---|
| Matches | 2 |
| Runs scored | 3 |
| Batting average | 1.50 |
| 100s/50s | –/– |
| Top score | 3* |
| Catches/stumpings | –/– |
- Source: Cricinfo, 27 December 2019

Thomas Smelt (c. 1820 – 1893) was an English first-class cricketer.

Born at Manchester in 1820, Smelt made two appearances in first-class cricket for Manchester, playing against Sheffield at Hyde Park in 1848 and the Marylebone Cricket Club at Lord's in 1852. He was by profession a commissioning agent.
