= Art Treasures Exhibition, Manchester 1857 =

Temporary exhibition of art

Coordinates: 53°27′42″N 2°17′04″W

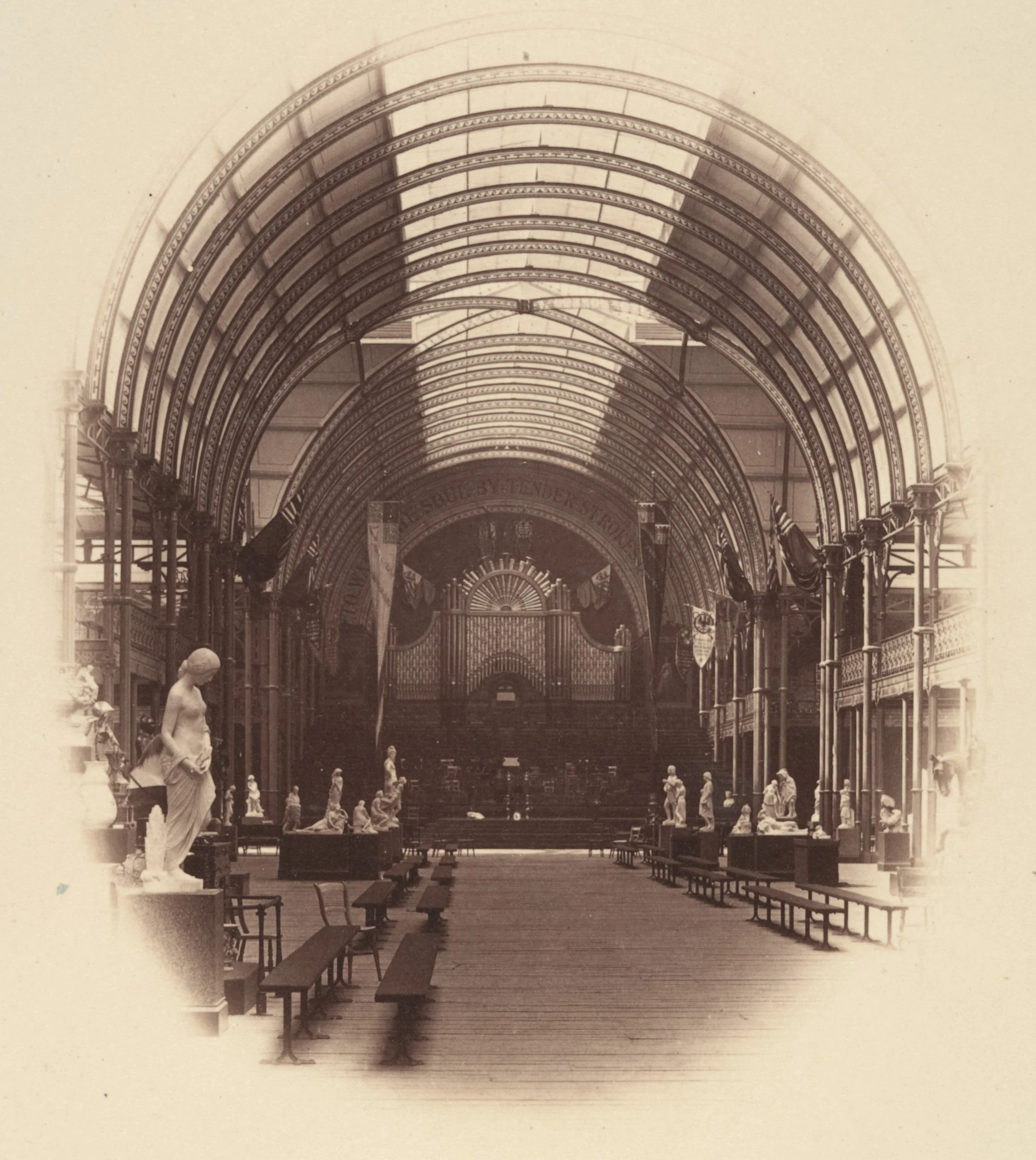
The exhibition's central hall

The Art Treasures of Great Britain was an exhibition of fine art held in Manchester, England, from 5 May to 17 October 1857. It remains the largest art exhibition to be held in the UK, possibly in the world, with over 16,000 works on display. It attracted over 1.3 million visitors in the 142 days it was open, about four times the population of Manchester at that time, many of whom visited on organised railway excursions. Its selection and display of artworks had a formative influence on the public art collections that were then being established in the UK, such as the National Gallery, National Portrait Gallery and the Victoria and Albert Museum.

== Background ==
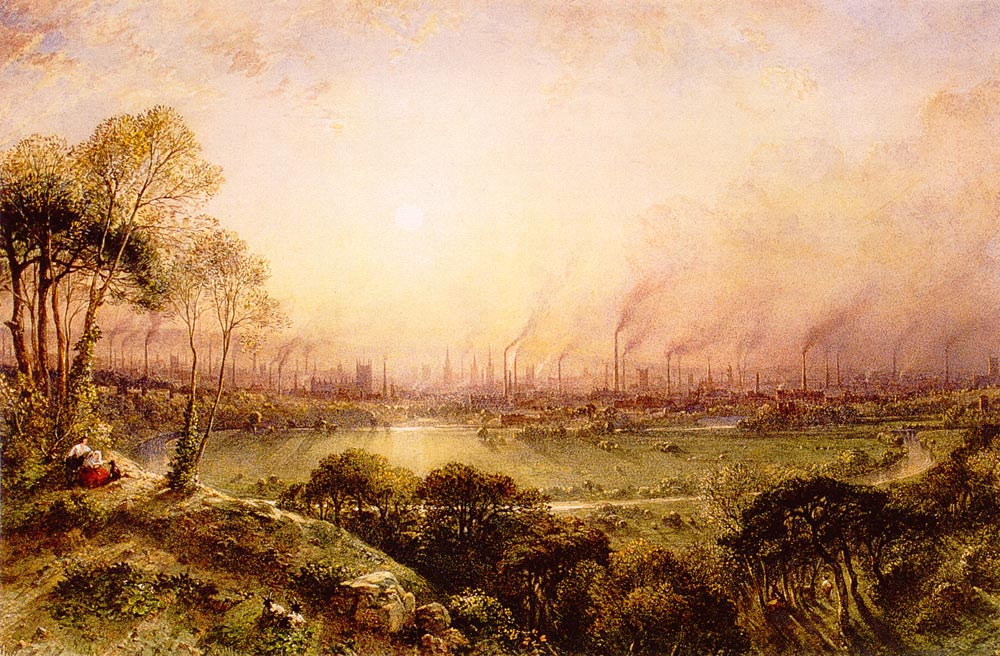
William Wyld's view of Manchester from Higher Broughton, 1852

Manchester was a small provincial town in the medieval period, but by 1855 it was an industrial city with 95 cotton mills and 1,724 warehouses. It was visited by French historian Alexis de Tocqueville in 1835, who scathingly wrote:

A sort of black smoke covers the town ... From this foul drain, the greatest stream of human industry flows out to fertilise the world.

Manchester gained city status in 1853, and the exhibition was financed by the city's increasingly affluent business grandees, who were motivated by a desire to demonstrate their cultural attainment, and inspired by the Paris International Exhibition in 1855, the Dublin Exhibition in 1853, and the Great Exhibition in 1851. There had already been an "Exposition of British Industrial Art in Manchester" in 1845. Unlike these earlier exhibitions, the Manchester exhibition was restricted to works of art without any industrial or trade items on display.

The idea for an exhibition in Manchester was first expressed in a letter sent on 10 February 1856 by John Connellan Deane, son of Irish architect Sir Thomas Deane and a commissioner for the 1853 Dublin Exhibition, to Thomas Fairbairn son of Manchester iron founder Sir William Fairbairn and a commissioner for the 1851 Great Exhibition. The concept quickly gained momentum: after an initial meeting on 26 March 1856, a guarantee fund of £74,000 was soon underwritten by around 100 contributors, and Queen Victoria and Prince Albert granted their patronage.

A General Committee established in May 1856, chaired by the Lord Lieutenant of Lancashire Francis Egerton, 1st Earl of Ellesmere (and, after his death in February 1857, by Samuel Jones-Loyd, 1st Baron Overstone), assisted by an Executive Committee chaired by Fairbairn. Deane was appointed as General Commissioner, on an annual salary of £1,000. The committee took artistic advice from German art historian Gustav Waagen, who had published the first 3 volumes of his Treasures of Art in Great Britain in 1854. George Scharf was appointed as the exhibition's Art Secretary; he became secretary and director to the newly founded National Portrait Gallery in 1857.

== Exhibition hall ==
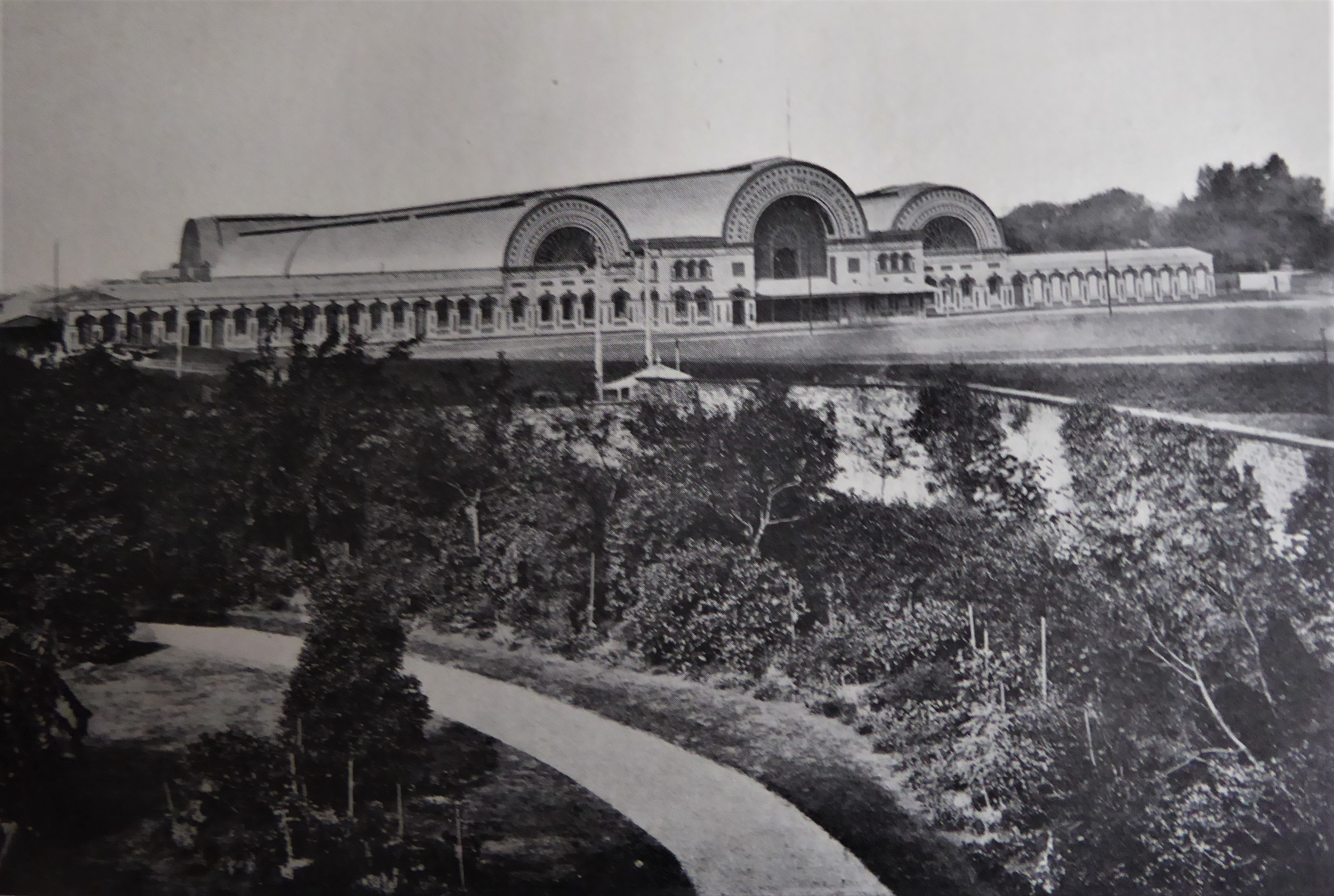
Art Treasures Exhibition buildings, 1857

The exhibition was held outside the city centre, on a three-acre site in Old Trafford owned by Sir Humphrey de Trafford, 2nd Baronet, which he had previously let as a cricket ground. Manchester Cricket Club surrendered its lease and moved a short distance to Old Trafford Cricket Ground. The site was conveniently adjacent to Manchester Botanical Garden and to the west of an existing railway line of the Manchester, South Junction and Altrincham Railway. The railway company built a new station (now Old Trafford tram stop) which was used by thousands of visitors from the city and from further afield on organised excursions.

C.D. Young & Co, of London and Edinburgh – already engaged as builders of the new art museum in South Kensington (which later became the V&A) – were appointed as contractors to build a temporary iron-and-glass structure similar to the Crystal Palace in London, 656 feet (200 m) long and 200 feet (61 m) wide, with one central barrel vault 56 feet (17 m) wide with a 24 feet (7.3 m) wide hip vault on either side roofing a 104 feet (32 m) wide central gallery running the length of the building, and narrower barrel vaults 45 feet (14 m) wide to either side, all crossed by a 104 feet (32 m) transept towards the western end. The design of the main structure has been attributed to Francis Fowke, who later designed the Natural History Museum in London, and an ornamental brick entrance at the eastern end was designed by local architect Edward Salomons. The materials used included 650 long tons (660 t) of cast iron, 600 long tons (610 t) of wrought iron, 65,000 square feet (6,000 m^{2}) of glass and 1.5 million bricks.

Internally, the building included a large hall, with corrugated iron sides and vaults supported by iron columns, with space for an orchestra at one end and a large pipe organ by Kirtland and Jardine. Each column bore the exhibition's monogram: "ATE". The hall was subdivided internally by partitions, creating separate galleries. The interior was lined with wood panels covered with calico. Most internal decoration was done by John Gregory Crace of London. A 24-foot (7.3 m) wide gallery ran around the transept at an upper level. The central third of each vault was glazed, providing ample diffuse light. In the summer, the glazing in the picture galleries was shaded with calico to prevent damage to the artworks, and firemen played water on the roof as a form of rudimentary air conditioning when the interior temperature exceeded 70 °F (21 °C). Young & Co's original quote of £24,500 proved over-optimistic, and cost overruns pushed the final bill up to £37,461.

Over the entrance was inscribed the first line of John Keats's Endymion: "A thing of beauty is a joy for ever." By the exit was a line from Alexander Pope's Prologue to Joseph Addison's Cato: "To wake the soul by tender strokes of art."

The hall also included two public refreshment rooms, First Class and Second Class, later supplemented by a tent outside, and a separate royal reception room. Following his visit, American author Nathaniel Hawthorne wrote that, in the Second Class refreshment room:

John Bull and his female may be seen in full gulp and guzzle, swallowing vast quantities of cold boiled beef, thoroughly moistened with porter or bitter

== Works exhibited ==
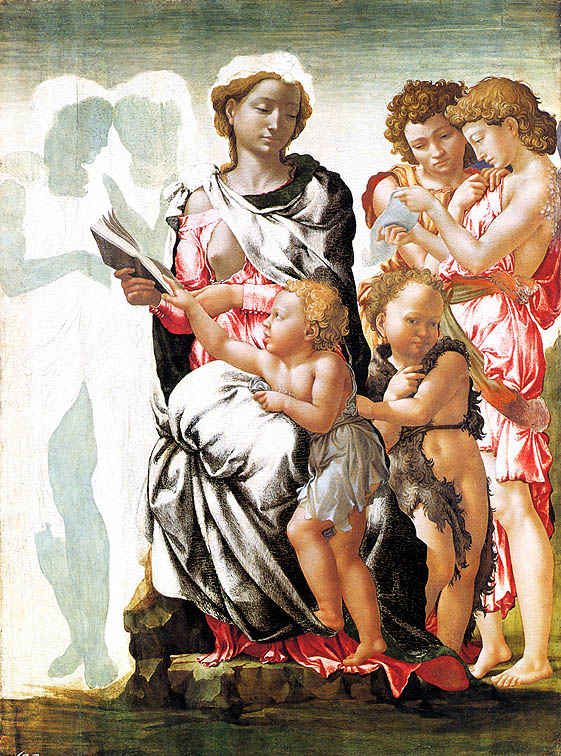
Michelangelo's Virgin and Child with Saint John and Angels, also known as the Manchester Madonna, c. 1497

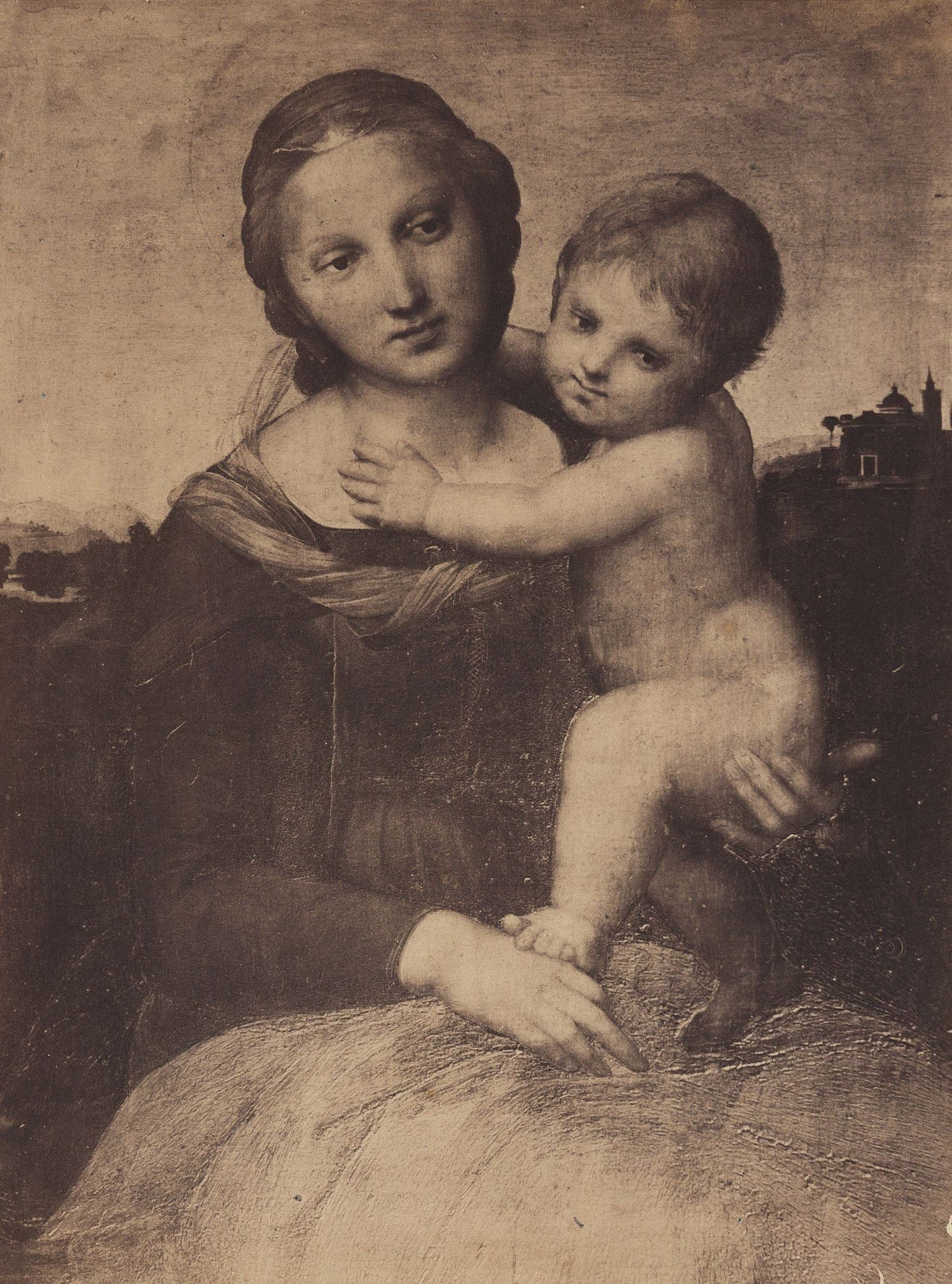
Raphael, Small Cowper Madonna, 1505, National Gallery of Art, Washington, photo by Caldesi & Montecchi

The exhibition comprised over 16,000 works split into 10 categories: Pictures by Ancient Masters, Pictures by Modern Masters, British Portraits and Miniatures, Water Colour Drawings, Sketches and Original Drawings (Ancient), Engravings, Illustrations of Photography, Works of Oriental Art, Varied Objects of Oriental Art, and Sculpture. The collection included 5,000 paintings and drawings by "Modern Masters" such as Hogarth, Gainsborough, Turner, Constable, and the Pre-Raphaelites, and 1,000 works by European Old Masters, including Rubens, Raphael, Titian and Rembrandt; several hundred sculptures; photographs, including Crimean War images by James Robertson and the photographic tableau Two Ways of Life by Oscar Gustave Rejlander; and other works of decorative arts, such as Wedgwood china, Sèvres and Meissen porcelain, Venetian glass, Limoges enamels, ivories, tapestries, furniture, tableware and armour. The committee bought the collection of Jules Soulages of Toulouse, founder of the Société Archéologique du Midi de la France for £13,500 to form the core of the collection of medieval and Renaissance decorative arts. The collection had previously been exhibited at Marlborough House in London with a view to being acquired for the South Kensington Museum (now the V&A), but the Treasury refused to fund the purchase. They were later acquired by the V&A.

The works were organised chronologically, to demonstrate the development of art, with works from northern Europe on one wall contrasted with contemporaneous works from southern Europe on the facing wall. Although the collection included works from Europe and the Orient, it had a clear emphasis on British works.

Most public British collections were in a nascent state, so most of the works were borrowed from 700 private collections. Many had never been exhibited in public before. The exhibition included the Madonna and Child with Saint John and the Angels which had only recently been attributed to Michelangelo. The display of this unfinished work caused much excitement, and it is still known as the Manchester Madonna. The French art critic Théophile Thoré commented that:

La collection de Manchester vaut à peu près le Louvre ("Manchester's collection is worth almost as much as the Louvre's").

Not all private owners responded positively to the committee's entreaties to lend their works of art. William Cavendish, 7th Duke of Devonshire reportedly declined, replying contemptuously: What in the world do you want with art in Manchester? Why can't you stick to your cotton spinning?

== Visitors ==
The exhibition was opened by Prince Albert on 5 May 1857, in mourning following the death of Princess Mary, Duchess of Gloucester and Edinburgh only a few days before, on 30 April. The exhibition was visited ceremonially by Queen Victoria on 29 June, during her second visit to Manchester, and then by the Queen and her entourage privately on 30 June. The exhibition ran until 17 October 1857, but was closed on Wednesday 7 October 1857 to mark a "day of humiliation" on account of the ongoing Indian Mutiny.

Season tickets were sold in advance for 2 guineas (including admission on the two state ceremonial occasions) or 1 guinea (without). During the first 10 days, and on Thursdays, daily admission was half a crown; on other days, admission was reduced to 1 shilling. An experiment in reducing admission to sixpence after 2 pm on Saturdays – to encourage working class visitors – did not noticeably increase revenue and was abandoned.

The exhibition attracted more than 1.3 million visitors – about four times the population of Manchester in 1857. Prominent visitors included Leopold I of Belgium, Queen Sophie of the Netherlands, Napoleon III, Benjamin Disraeli, William Ewart Gladstone, Lord Palmerston, Arthur Wellesley, 2nd Duke of Wellington, Charles Dickens, Alfred Lord Tennyson, Florence Nightingale, Elizabeth Gaskell, John Ruskin, Nathaniel Hawthorne, and Maria Mitchell. Titus Salt chartered three trains to transport 2,600 of his factory workers from Saltaire to visit on Saturday 19 September. Many other railway excursions were organised, mostly from the towns and cities around Manchester, but also Shrewsbury, Preston, Leeds, Grimsby, Nottingham, and Lincoln. Thomas Cook had arranged excursions to the Great Exhibition in 1851 and the Paris Exhibition in 1855, and this time he organised "moonlight" excursions from Newcastle, leaving at midnight and returning late that evening.

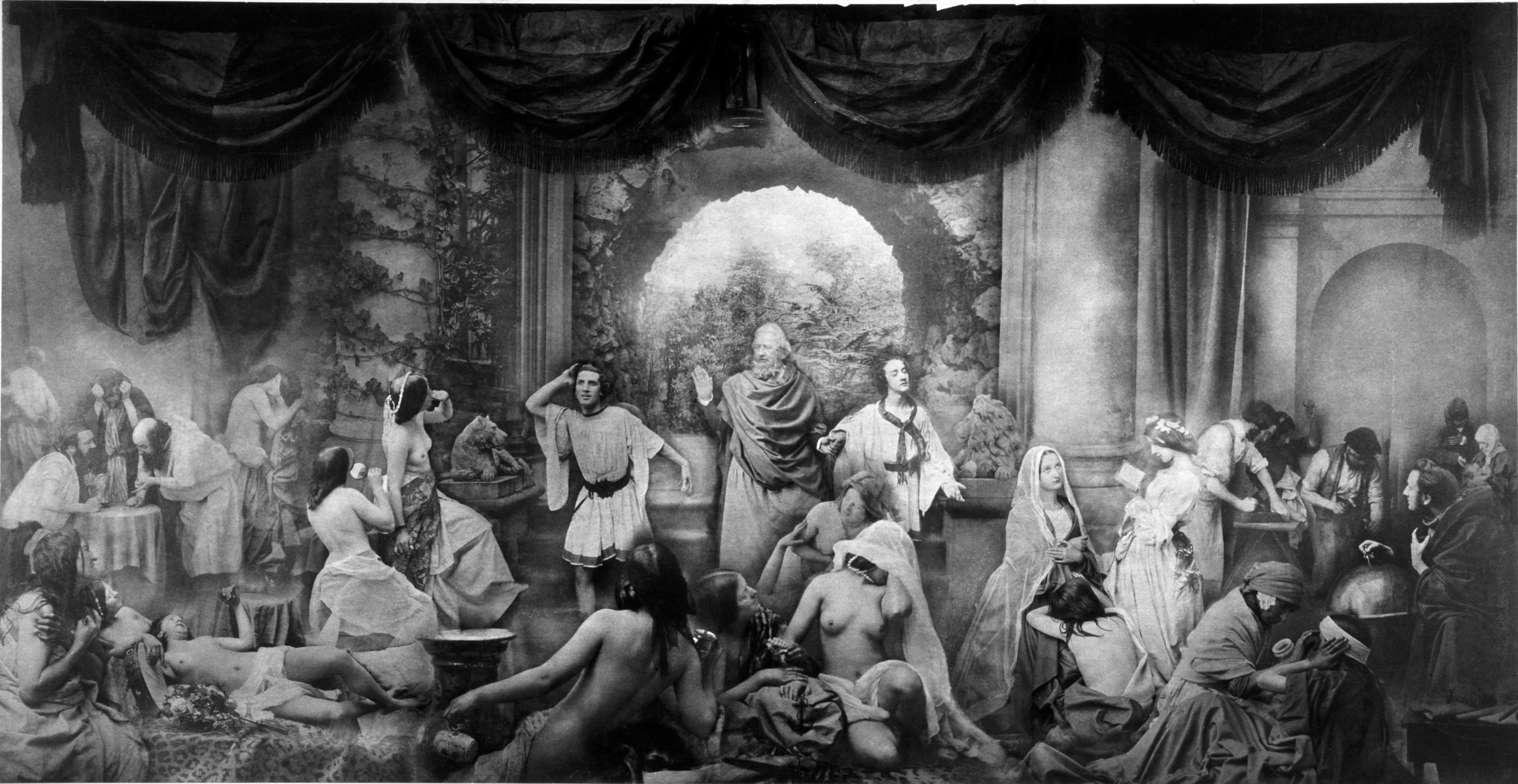
Oscar Gustave Rejlander allegorical photographic montage, The Two Ways of Life, first exhibited at the Manchester Art Treasures Exhibition in 1857

Friedrich Engels wrote to Karl Marx about the exhibition: "Everyone up here is an art lover just now and the talk is all of the pictures at the exhibition".

To entertain the visitors, Charles Hallé was asked to organise an orchestra to perform a daily concert, in addition to a daily organ recital. After the exhibition closed, he continued running the orchestra, which became the Hallé Orchestra. A temporary "Art Treasure Hotel" housed some visitors overnight, and others were directed to local boarding houses.

The exhibition gave rise to several different publications. The committee published a 234-page catalogue, a series of "Handbooks" by type of object, and an illustrated weekly periodical "The Art Treasures Examiner". An apparently satirical book by "Tennyson Longfellow Smith" of "Poems inspired by Certain Pictures at the Art Treasures Exhibition" was illustrated with caricatures. A 16-page booklet was titled the "What to see, and Where to see it: The Operative's Guide to the Manchester Art Treasures Exhibition" (an "operative" was the operator of a machine, as in a mill).

Sales of season tickets raised more than £20,000, added to daily admission fees amounting to nearly £61,000. Another £8,111 was raised by selling over 160,000 catalogues, plus £239 from selling concert programmes. Almost £1,500 came from the charges for safe-keeping of personal effects at the cloakroom, and £3,346 from the refreshments contract.

== Aftermath ==
From gross receipts of £110,588 9s. 8d., the exhibition made a small profit of £304 14s. 4d, a good result compared to the crippling £20,000 loss made by the Dublin Exhibition, which ruined its organiser William Dargan. The railway that transported visitors to the site did even better, making a profit of about £50,000. After the exhibition ended, the exhibited works were returned to their owners, and the temporary building and its contents were auctioned. Glass display cases were bought by the new museums under construction in South Kensington. The building was entirely demolished by November 1858. Having cost over £37,000 in all, the materials comprising the building sold for little more than £7,000; internal fittings and decorations that cost £18,581 sold for £2,836.

The site became part of Manchester Botanical Gardens, and was used to hold a Royal Jubilee Exhibition in 1887, to celebrate the 50th anniversary of Queen Victoria's accession to the throne. The gardens closed in 1907, becoming White City Pleasure Gardens in 1907 and near the present-day White City Retail Park.

The exhibition was used as a model for the display of art in public galleries during the second half of the 19th century. Although the works displayed were returned to private collections, many found their way into public collections over the following decades, having usefully boosted their reputation by their appearance in Manchester. The National Portrait Gallery in London had been founded in 1856 and opened its doors to the public in 1858. Scharf was its first director, and arranged the displays in chronological order, as the Manchester exhibition had done.

A second but smaller National Art Treasures Exhibition was held in Folkestone in May – October 1886. A large exhibition of paintings was held in Bethnal Green, an industrial part of the East End of London, from 1872, designed specifically to attract working-class visitors. This was in what is now the V&A Museum of Childhood, using prefabricated buildings moved from South Kensington.

An exhibition was held at Manchester Art Gallery in 2007–08 to commemorate the 150th anniversary of the Art Treasures Exhibition, and a conference was held at the University of Manchester in November 2007.
