= Henry Pickford =

English cricketer

Personal information
- Full name: Henry Pickford
- Born: c. 1820; Cheadle, Cheshire, England
- Died: Unknown
- Batting: Unknown

Domestic team information
- Years: Team
- 1849: Lancashire

Career statistics
Competition	First-class
Matches	11
Runs scored	139
Batting average	6.61
100s/50s	–/–
Top score	27
Catches/stumpings	1/–
- Source: Cricinfo, 2 April 2019

Henry Pickford (c. 1820 – date of death unknown) was an English first-class cricketer.

Pickford was born at Cheadle, Cheshire. He made his debut in first-class cricket for Manchester against Yorkshire at Manchester. He played in first-class matches for Manchester on nine occasions between 1844 and 1857, including on two occasions when the matches were billed as Lancashire v Yorkshire in 1849. He also played two first-class matches for the North in the North v South fixtures of 1847 and 1848. Across eleven first-class matches, Pickford scored 139 runs at an average of 6.61, with a high score of 27.
