= Lea Birch =

English cricketer

Personal information
- Full name: Lea Birch
- Born: 17 January 1798; Cartmel, Lancashire, England
- Died: 13 June 1868 (aged 70); Totnes, Devon, England
- Batting: Unknown
- Bowling: Unknown
- Relatives: Scholes Birch (son)

Career statistics
Competition	First-class
Matches	2
Runs scored	26
Batting average	8.66
100s/50s	–/–
Top score	11
Balls bowled	156
Wickets	8
Bowling average	11.50
5 wickets in innings	–
10 wickets in match	–
Best bowling	4/40
Catches/stumpings	1/–
- Source: Cricinfo, 30 December 2019

Lea Birch (17 January 1798 – 13 June 1868) was an English first-class cricketer.

Birch was born in January 1798 at Cartmel, Lancashire. He played first-class cricket on two occasions for Manchester, with both matches coming against Yorkshire in 1844 and 1845 at Moss Lane. He scored 26 runs with a high score of 11 across his two appearances, in addition to taking 8 wickets with best figures of 4 for 40. He married Amy Downward in 1823, with the couple having three sons. Their son, Scholes, also played first-class cricket. Birch died in June 1868 at Totnes, Devon.
