= Whitlow (surname) =

Whitlow is a surname, and may refer to:

- Bob Whitlow (1936–2020), American football player
- Edward Whitlow (c.1832–1870), English cricketer
- Fred Whitlow (1904–1978), English footballer
- Jill Whitlow (born 1964), actress
- Ken Whitlow (1917–1969), American football player
- Mike Whitlow (born 1968), footballer
- Robert V. Whitlow (1918–1997), military officer
- Robert Whitlow, film-maker and author
- Woodrow Whitlow Jr., associate administrator for Mission Support at NASA
