= William Norris (English cricketer) =

English clergyman and cricketer

William Arthur Norris (4 November 1830 – 16 April 1889 (Note: Norris's death is given as 1899 in CricketArchive, but other sources give 1889, and a notice in The Times in 1890 of his daughter's marriage refers to him as "The late Rev. W. A. Norris", which appears conclusive.)) was an English clergyman and a cricketer who played in one first-class cricket match for Cambridge University in 1851. He also rowed for Cambridge University in the University Boat Race of 1852. He was born and died at Halifax, West Yorkshire.

Norris was educated at Eton College and at Trinity College, Cambridge. Norris was a regular cricket player as a middle-order batsman in the first team at Eton, appearing in the Eton v Harrow match in both 1848 and 1849. At Cambridge, he had only one match for the first eleven, but that was the University Match of 1851 against Oxford University, when he batted at No 10 and scored 12 runs in his only innings. After this match, he played only in minor cricket.

Norris graduated from Cambridge in 1854 and was ordained as a Church of England priest. He served as curate at Langley, then in Worcestershire, at Aberford in Yorkshire and at Felixkirk, also in Yorkshire. From 1860 to 1875 he was rector of Oaksey, Wiltshire, and from 1875 to his death he was vicar of Flore, Northamptonshire.
