= Henry Braybrooke =

English cricketer

Personal information
- Full name: Henry Mellor Braybrooke
- Born: 11 February 1869; Kandy, Ceylon
- Died: 28 October 1935 (aged 66); Hawkhurst, Kent
- Batting: Right-handed
- Bowling: Right-arm medium
- Relatives: George Bigge (brother-in-law)

Domestic team information
- Years: Team
- 1891: Cambridge University
- 1891–1899: Kent

Career statistics
Competition	First-class
Matches	28
Runs scored	690
Batting average	14.37
100s/50s	0/2
Top score	53
Balls bowled	25
Wickets	0
Bowling average	–
5 wickets in innings	–
10 wickets in match	–
Best bowling	–
Catches/stumpings	15/–
- Source: CricInfo, 5 April 2017

Henry Mellor Braybrooke MBE (11 February 1869 – 28 October 1935) was an amateur English cricketer who played first-class cricket in England for Cambridge University, Kent County Cricket Club and an unofficial England XI between 1891 and 1899. He was born at Kandy in what was then Ceylon, the son of Philip Watson of Tunbridge Wells in Kent.

Educated at Wellington College, Berkshire, where he was in the cricket First XI in 1886, and at Pembroke College, Cambridge. Braybrooke played golf against Oxford University in 1890 and 1891, graduated in 1891 and was awarded a master's degree in 1897. He was picked as a right-handed batsman for six first-class matches by Cambridge University in 1891, but did not win a Blue.

Braybrooke played six matches for Kent in 1891, making his first-class debut for the county against the Marylebone Cricket Club at Lord's in June. He played 11 matches for the county during 1892 and was awarded his county cap during the season. His first-class cricket after 1892 was limited to a single match in 1893 and four in 1899, including a game at Eastbourne for an "England XI" against the touring Australians in which every other player was a Test cricketer. His final first-class appearance was for Kent against Middlesex at Lord's in June 1899. He continued to play in club cricket for teams such as the Bluemantles.

During the First World War, Braybrooke was the commandant of Oakfields military hospital at Hawkhurst in Kent. In 1919 he was awarded an MBE for his service. He died at Hawkhurst in October 1935 aged 66.

== Bibliography ==
- Carlaw, Derek (2020). Kent County Cricketers, A to Z: Part One (1806–1914) (PDF). Cardiff: ACS.
