= Jonathan H. Earle =

American author & historian

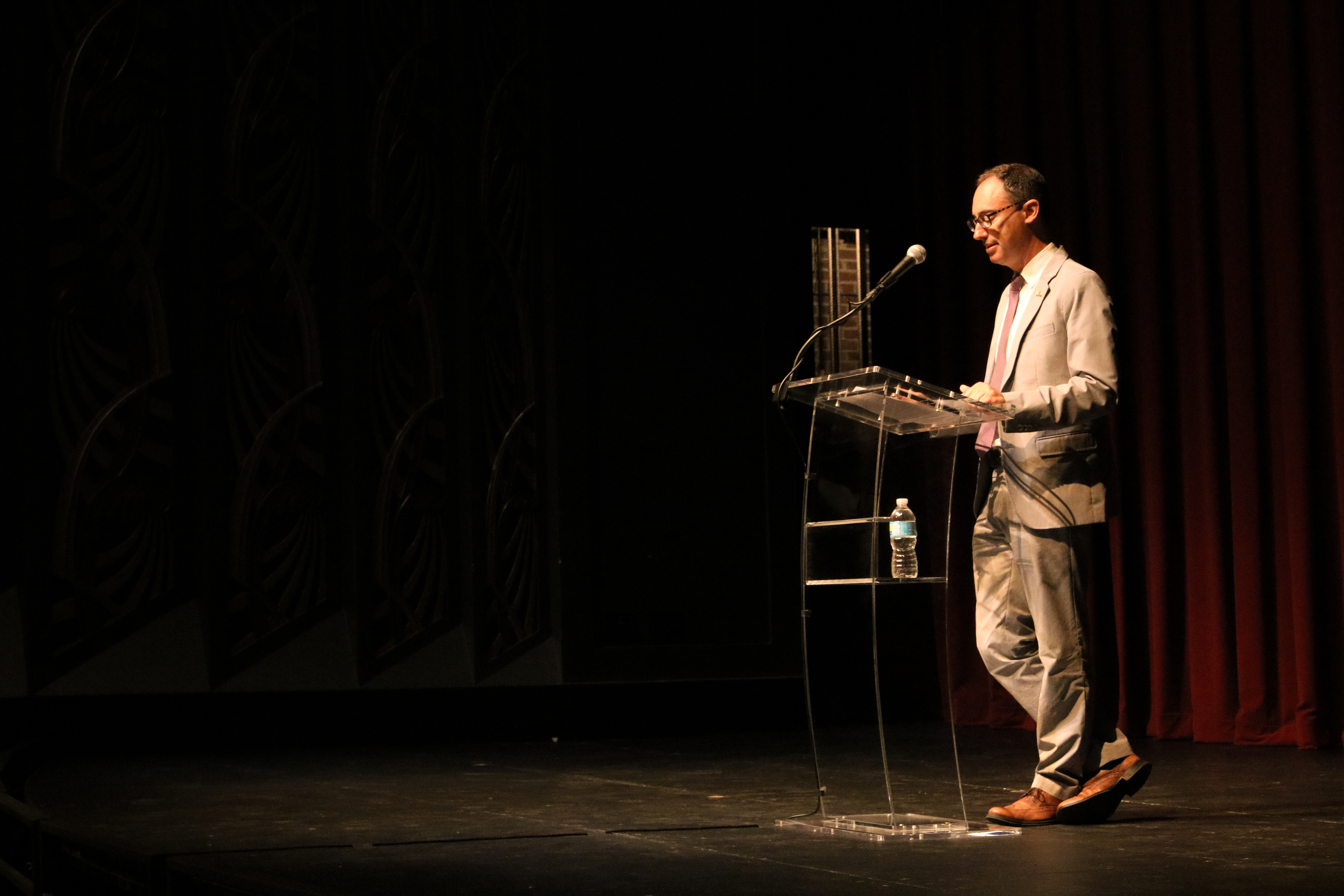
- Dean Jonathan Earle speaks at the Roger Hadfield Ogden Honors College Convocation in August 2017.

Academic background
- Education: Columbia University (BA); Princeton University (PhD)

Academic work
- Discipline: American history
- Institutions: University of Kansas; Louisiana State University

Jonathan H. Earle is an author, historian, professor, and dean. He is an historian of American politics and culture who focuses on the early republic and antebellum periods, especially the antislavery movement and the sectional crisis leading up to the Civil War. Currently Earle serves as Dean of the Roger Hadfield Ogden Honors College at Louisiana State University, a post he has held since 2014.

== Early life and education ==
A native of suburban Washington, D.C., Earle is a specialist in the history of the antebellum United States. Earle was educated at Columbia (BA History) and Princeton (MA, Ph.D. U.S. History) Universities.

== Career ==
Earle entered the University of Kansas in 1997, where he taught as a longtime faculty member in the Department of History. During his time at Kansas he served as the associate director of the Robert J. Dole Institute of Politics between 2003 and 2010. In 2013, Earle was named director of the University Honors Program at Kansas, where he served until 2014. Since 2014 Earle has been Dean of the LSU Roger Hadfield Ogden Honors College. Under his leadership, the Ogden Honors College received a $12 million naming gift from New Orleans philanthropist Roger Ogden, fully renovated the French House — the historic building at the center of LSU's campus which houses the college's classroom, advising, staff, and co-curricular spaces — and, in partnership with LSU's provost and president, greatly increased the university's financial and academic commitment to honors education.

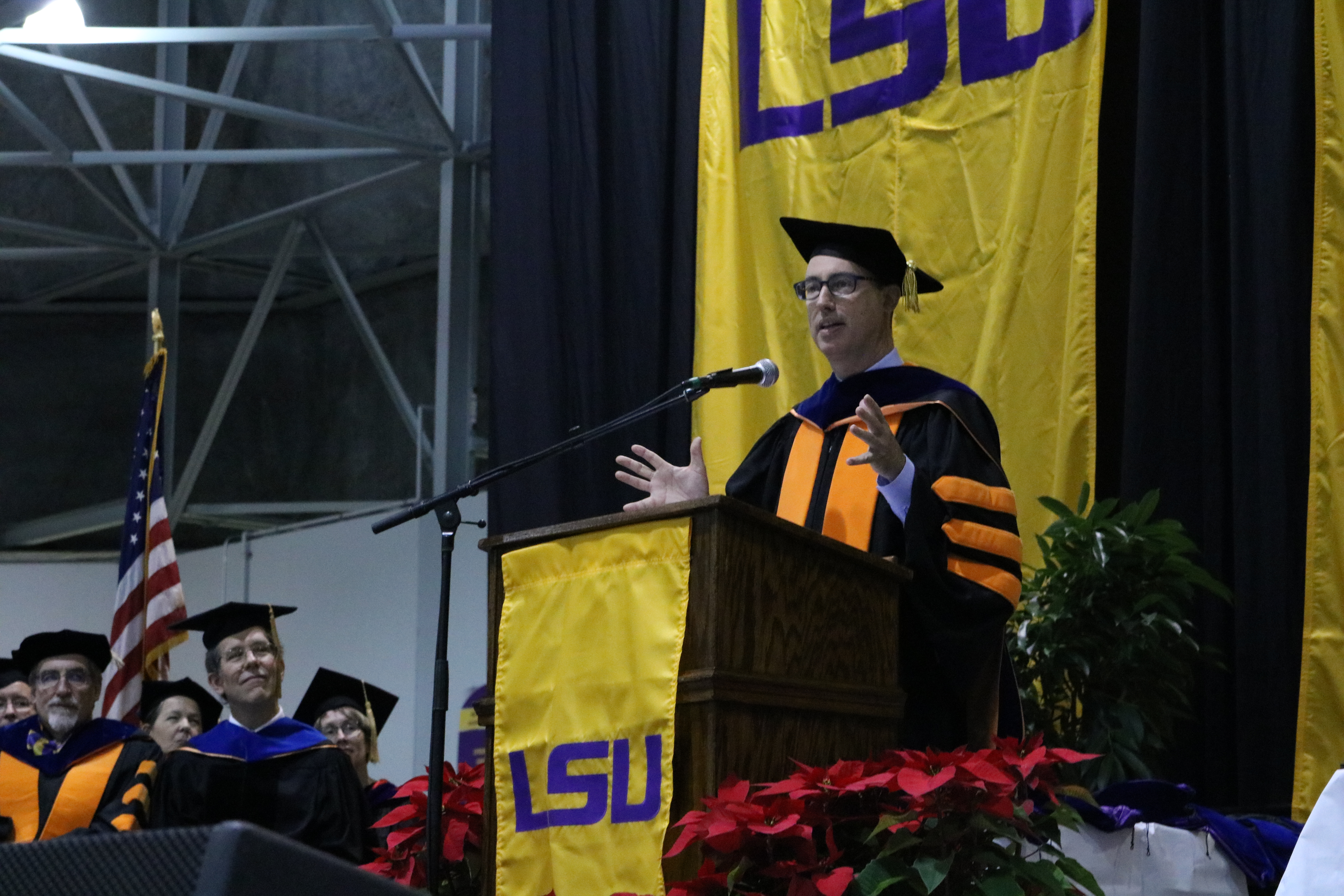
Roger Hadfield Ogden Honors College Dean Jonathan Earle speaking at the Louisiana State University College of Science Commencement in December 2017.

He is the author of numerous books and articles including Jacksonian Antislavery and the Politics of Free Soil (UNC Press, 2004), John Brown's Raid: A Brief History With Documents (Bedford/St. Martin's Press, 2008), The Routledge Atlas of African American History (Routledge, 2000), and co-author of Major Problems in the Early American Republic (Cengage, 2007). Earle is the recipient of the Society of Historians of the Early American Republic's 2005 Broussard prize and co-winner of the Byron Caldwell Smith Book Prize. In 2013, the University Press of Kansas published his edited collection Bleeding Kansas, Bleeding Missouri: The Long Civil War on the Border, which was named a Notable Book by the Kansas State Library.

In the Spring semester of 2017 Earle co-taught an Honors seminar course at LSU titled "272 Slaves: Discovering Louisiana's (And Georgetown's) Past" with Jennifer Cramer, director of the T. Harry Williams Center for Oral History with the LSU library. The course covered the complex history of slavery in the United States, with a special focus on the Louisiana descendants of a group of 272 slaves sold in 1838 by the Jesuit Maryland Province. A parallel course was taught at Georgetown University, granting students from both universities the opportunity to discuss shared readings over Skype. The course gained prominent local and national coverage.

Earle is currently working on a book on the election of 1860 for the Pivotal Moments in U.S. History Series published by Oxford University Press.

== Honors, awards, and recognitions ==
In support of his research, Earle has received major fellowships from the NEH and the American Council of Learned Societies. He spent the 2006–2007 academic year as the Ray Allen Billington Chair in U.S. History at Occidental College and the Huntington Library and the 1999–2000 academic year as an NEH Fellow at the Huntington. Earle has appeared on numerous programs and documentaries on the History Channel, C-SPAN, and PBS. The History News Network named him a Top Young Historian in 2007.

== Publications ==
=== Books, edited volumes ===
- Earle, Jonathan Halperin (2026). He has the people: Abraham Lincoln and the election of 1860. New York, New York: Oxford University Press. ISBN 978-0-19-534165-2.
- —; Burke, Diane Mutti, eds. (2013). Bleeding Kansas, Bleeding Missouri: The Long Civil War on the Border. University Press of Kansas. ISBN 978-0700619290.
- —, ed. (2008). John Brown's Raid on Harpers Ferry: A Brief History with Documents. Boston, MA: Bedford/St. Martin's Press. ISBN 978-0312392802.
- —; Wilentz, Sean, eds. (2007). Major Problems in the Early Republic. Boston, MA: Houghton Mifflin. ISBN 978-0618522583.
- —, ed. (2004). Jacksonian Antislavery and the Politics of Free Soil, 1824–1854. Chapel Hill, NC: The University of North Carolina Press. ISBN 978-0807855553.
- —, ed. (2000). The Routledge Atlas of African American History. Routledge Atlases of American History. New York: Routledge. ISBN 978-0415921428.

=== Books, chapters ===
- — (2005). "Beecher's Bibles and Broadswords: Paving the Way for the Civil War in the West, 1854-1859". In Scharff, Virginia (ed.). Empire and Liberty: The Civil War in the West. University of California Press. ISBN 978-0520281264.
- — (2013). "'If I Went West, I Think I Would Go to Kansas': Abraham Lincoln, the Sunflower State, and the Election of 1860". In Earle; Burke (eds.). Bleeding Kansas, Bleeding Missouri: The Long Civil War on the Border. University Press of Kansas. ISBN 978-0700619290.
- — (2011). "Saturday Evenings at the Baileys': Building an Antislavery Movement in Congress, 1833-1854". In Finkelman, Paul; Kennon, Donald R. (eds.). In the Shadow of Freedom: The Politics of Slavery in the National Capital. Athens, OH: Ohio University Press. ISBN 978-0821419342.
- — (2006). "John Brown of Osawatomie: The Making of an Anti-Slavery Warrior". In Dean, Virgil (ed.). John Brown to Bob Dole: Movers and Shakers in Kansas History. University Press of Kansas. pp. 3–34. ISBN 978-0700617234.

=== Books, chapters in textbooks ===
- — (2003). "Building an American Republic: From the First Imperial Crisis to The Federalist". In Woelfel, James; Trulove, Sarah (eds.). Patterns in Western Civilization (3rd ed.). Houghton Mifflin. pp. 52–95. ISBN 9780536679628.

=== Encyclopedia entries ===
- — (2000). "Abolitionism and Violence, 1831-1865". Violence in America: An Encyclopedia. Vol. 1. Charles Scribner's Sons. pp. 67–75. ISBN 9780684804873.

=== Journal articles ===
- — (April 2011). "Civil War at 150: The Political Origins of the Civil War". OAH Magazine of History. 25 (2): 8–23.
- — (December 2004). "The Making of the North's 'Stark Mad Abolitionists': Antislavery Conversion in the United States, 1824-1854". Slavery and Abolition. 25 (3): 54–72.
- — (2002). "Marcus Morton and the Dilemma of Jacksonian Antislavery in Massachusetts, 1817-1849". Massachusetts Historical Review. 4: 61–87.
- — (June 2000). "'Peculiarly Woman's Cause': Feminism, Race and the Struggle for Equality". Reviews in American History. 28: 223–229.
