= Stephen Braybrooke =

English cricketer (1808–1886)

Personal information
- Full name: Stephen Henry Braybrooke
- Born: 24 December 1808; Thanet, Kent, England
- Died: 1886 (aged 75/76); Salford, Lancashire, England
- Batting: Unknown
- Bowling: Unknown

Career statistics
Competition	First-class
Matches	2
Runs scored	9
Batting average	3.00
100s/50s	–/–
Top score	6
Balls bowled	6
Wickets	0
Bowling average	–
5 wickets in innings	–
10 wickets in match	–
Best bowling	–
Catches/stumpings	2/–
- Source: Cricinfo, 30 December 2019

Stephen Henry Braybrooke (24 December 1808 – 1886) was an English first-class cricketer.

Born at Thanet in December 1808, Braybrooke was by profession a mill owner at Oldham, specialising in the spinning and manufacture of cotton. He played first-class cricket on two occasions for Manchester, with both matches coming against Yorkshire in 1844 and 1845 at Moss Lane. Braybrooke died at Salford in 1886.
