= Whitlow (given name) =

Whitlow is a given name. Notable people with this name include:

- Whitlow Au, bioacoustician
- James Whitlow Delano (born 1960), photographer
- Whit Wyatt, (1907–1999), baseball player
