= Thomas Davis (cricketer) =

English cricketer

Thomas Davis (27 November 1827 – 29 May 1898) was an English professional cricketer who played first-class cricket between 1854 and 1865.

Davis was born at Nottingham in 1827. He lived at Sneinton and worked as a printer and metal worker. From about 1850 he was employed as a professional cricketer in a number of posts, including in Dublin from 1865 to 1869.

Davis played in 18 first-class matches, 12 of which were for Nottinghamshire County Cricket Club. He played regularly for touring sides such as the All England Eleven and United All England Eleven and was later employed by Nottingham Corporation to operate Forest Recreation Ground in the town.

Davis died in 1898 at Nottingham. He was aged 70.
