= John Earl (cricketer, born 1788) =

English cricketer

John Earl (31 July 1788 – 20 April 1866) was an English first-class cricketer active 1844–45 who played for Manchester Cricket Club as a left-handed batsman. Earl played twice for Manchester, scoring 16 runs with a highest score of 8. He was born in Quorndon; died in Chorlton-cum-Hardy. His son was John Henry Earl who also played for Manchester.
