= White City, Greater Manchester =

Retail park in Manchester, England

Coordinates: 53.461651°N 2.283510°W

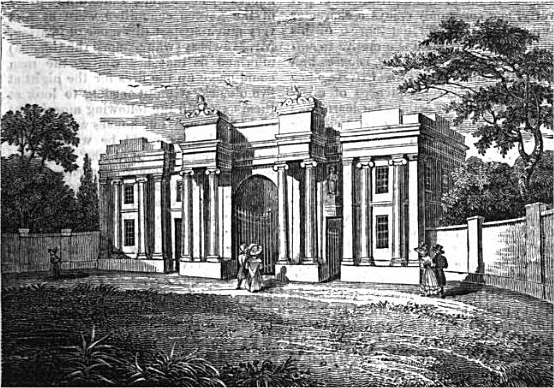
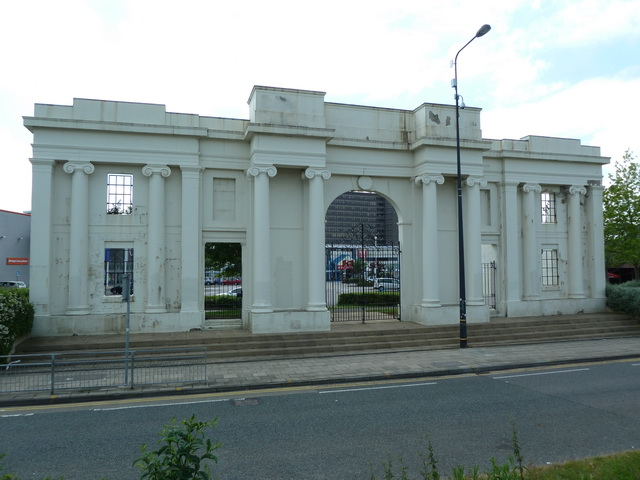
Original gateway to the Botanical gardens, 1830s (top), 2012 (bottom)

White City is an area in Old Trafford, Greater Manchester, England. Part of the site, which is adjacent to Chester Road, is now a retail park. The area was originally the former Manchester Botanic Gardens that occupied the southeast corner of the docks area and Manchester United's ground. The gateway of the Botanic Gardens still stands at the edge of the retail park. In 1857, the Art Treasures Exhibition was held in the gardens.

White City has also been an amusement park and a sports stadium that has featured athletics, greyhound racing and motorsports.

== Toponym ==
The area is named after White City Limited, which opened an amusement park on the site in 1907.

== History ==
=== Botanic gardens ===
In 1827 the Botanical and Horticultural Society was founded in Manchester to encourage the study of botany and horticulture. The society built a botanical garden on the site covering 16 acres (65,000 m^{2}). The site was chosen by John Dalton for the society as it was down-wind of pollution from the city. The land, which was owned by Thomas de Trafford, was leased to the society at a price of the society's choosing.

The gardens featured a complex of plant houses and a conservatory that was built by Clarke and Jones of Birmingham. The building was 321 feet (98 m) in length and the conservatory had a 40 feet (12 m) high dome. The buildings were heated by a system of hot water flowing through pipes. The Grade II listed gateway that still faces Chester Road was the entrance to the gardens.

In 1857 the gardens hosted the Art Treasures Exhibition which was opened by Prince Albert. The exhibition was visited by 1.3million visitors in 142-days. A further exhibition was held in 1887 to celebrate Queen Victoria's Golden Jubilee. This exhibition attracted 4.74 million people over 192-days.

=== Redevelopment ===
By the end of the 19th century, interest in the gardens was waning as the wealthy were moving away from Manchester city centre. In 1907, part of the garden's site was leased to White City Limited, a company set up by Heathcote and Brown. The company opened the "White City Amusement Park" on the site on 20 May 1907.

The remaining 11 acres (45,000 m^{2}) was sold to Canine Sports Ltd on 1 November 1927 for the construction of White City Stadium.

=== Stadium ===
White City Stadium held its first motorcycle speedway race on 16 July 1928. After the stadium was completed, greyhound racing starting in 1930. In July 1953, a 6-lane cinder track for athletics was added.

The stadium was a greyhound track from 1927 until 1982, speedway from 1928 to 1932 and stock cars from 1972 to 1982. At the end of 1981. the stadium was sold to a developer. It was left vacant, fell into disrepair and closed in 1982.

== Retail park ==
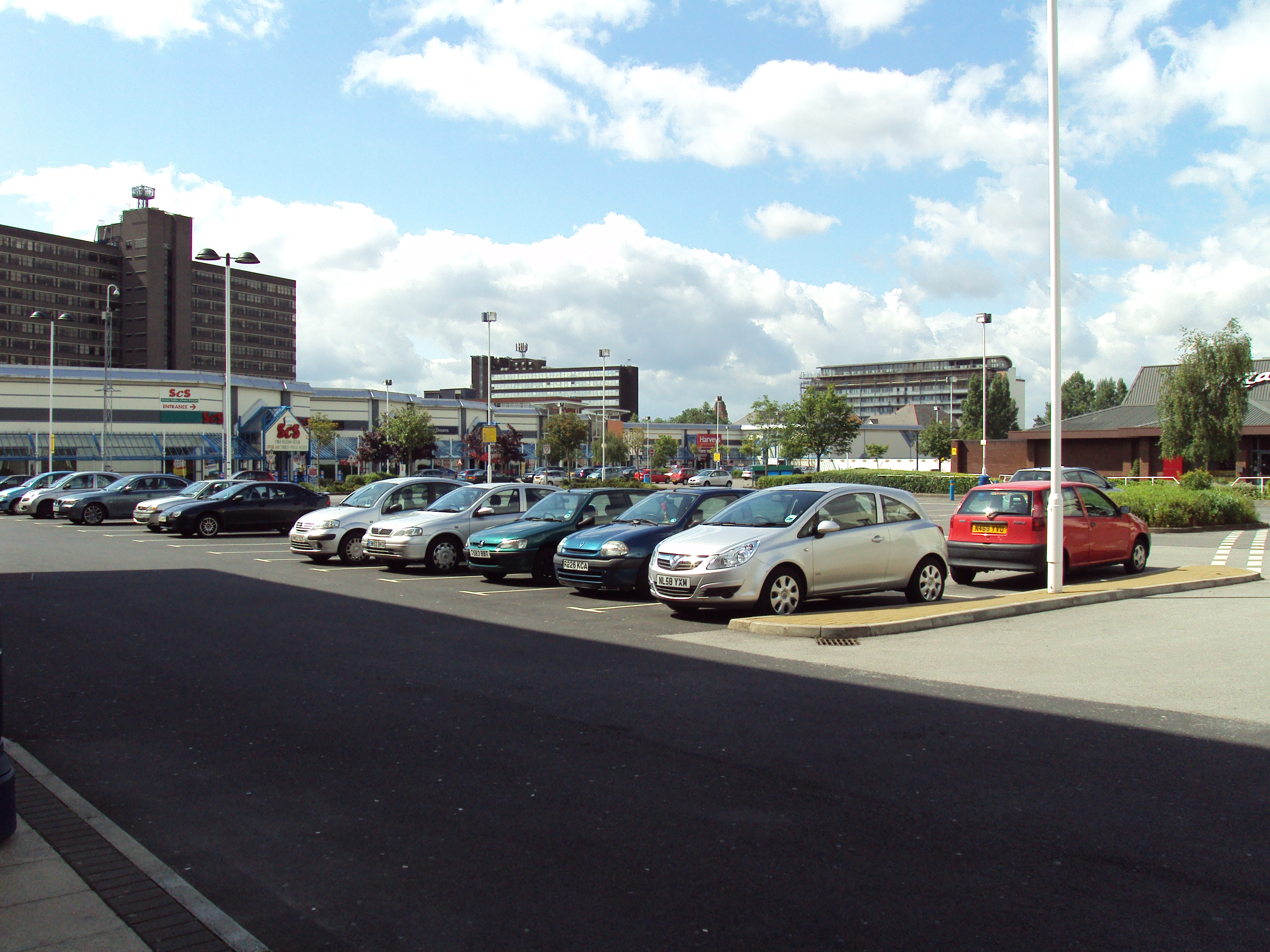
White City retail park

The stadium was eventually demolished and the site was redeveloped as White City Retail Park. The mid-sized shopping park has out-of-town parking with retail units and food outlets.

== See also ==
- Art Treasures Exhibition, Manchester 1857
- Botanical Gardens Cricket Ground
- Royal Jubilee Exhibition, Manchester 1887
