= Ernest Ensor =

English-born Irish cricketer (1876–1929)

Cricket information
- Batting: Right-handed
- Bowling: Right-arm fast-medium

International information
- National side: Ireland

Career statistics
Competition	First-class
Matches	4
Runs scored	65
Batting average	9.28
100s/50s	0/0
Top score	18
Balls bowled	1,016
Wickets	23
Bowling average	20.34
5 wickets in innings	2
10 wickets in match	0
Best bowling	5/74
Catches/stumpings	1/–
- Source: CricketArchive, 15 November 2022

Ernest Ensor (17 December 1870 – 13 August 1929) was an English-born Irish cricketer.

A right-handed batsman and right-arm fast-medium bowler, he played just once for the Ireland cricket team, against I Zingari in August 1896. In 1895, he played four first-class matches for Dublin University, taking 23 wickets at an average of 20.34.
