= Charlie Cameron (footballer, born 1874) =

Australian rules footballer

Personal information
- Full name: Charles Cameron
- Born: 24 March 1874; Collingwood, Victoria
- Died: 12 June 1936 (aged 62); Fitzroy, Victoria
- Original teams: Preston, Ormond College

Playing career^{1}
Years	Club	Games (Goals)
1897	Fitzroy	5 (1)
- ^{1} Playing statistics correct to the end of 1897.

Charlie Cameron (24 March 1874 – 12 June 1936) was an Australian rules footballer who played with Fitzroy in the first year of Victorian Football League (VFL).
