= Charlie Cameron (footballer, born 1886) =

Australian rules footballer

Personal information
- Full name: Charles Allan Cameron
- Born: 25 May 1886; Melbourne, Victoria
- Died: 27 February 1957 (aged 70); Burwood, Victoria

Playing career^{1}
| Years | Club | Games (Goals) |
| 1905 | South Melbourne | 1 (0) |
| 1908–10 | Geelong | 46 (5) |
| Total | | 47 (5) |
- ^{1} Playing statistics correct to the end of 1910.

Charles Allan Cameron (25 May 1886 – 27 February 1957) was an Australian rules footballer who played with South Melbourne and Geelong in the Victorian Football League (VFL).
