= Charles Cameron (cricketer) =

Irish cricketer

Personal information
- Full name: Charles F. Cameron
- Born: c. 1819; Ireland

Domestic team information
- Years: Team
- 1849: Lancashire

Career statistics
Competition	FC
Matches	1
Runs scored	0
Batting average	0.00
100s/50s	0/0
Top score	0*
Catches/stumpings	0/–
- Source: Cricinfo, 1 November 2015

Charles F. Cameron (c. 1819 – date of death unknown) was an Irish cricketer active in first-class cricket in 1849. He played in one match only for a Lancashire XI against a Yorkshire XI at the Botanical Gardens in Manchester, Cameron batted in both of Lancashire's innings, but failed to score any runs; he was dismissed bowled as one of Richard Skelton's seven wickets in their first-innings, and ended their second-innings not out.
