= Edward Whitlow =

English cricketer

Personal information
- Full name: Edward Hardmond Whitlow
- Born: c. 1832; Broughton, Lancashire, England
- Died: 29 November 1870 (aged 37–38); Melbourne, Victoria, Australia
- Bowling: Right-arm medium

Domestic team information
- Years: Team
- 1852–1854: Manchester
- 1858/59: Victoria
- Source: CricketArchive, 28 September 2016

Edward Hardmond Whitlow (c. 1832 – 29 November 1870) was an English cricketer who emigrated to Australia. Born in Broughton, Salford, he was a member of Manchester Cricket Club, playing in two first-class cricket matches for them between 1852 and 1854. He emigrated to Australia and played one first-class match for Victoria in 1859. Whitlow was a medium pace right arm roundarm bowler. He took four wickets with a best return of two for 60. He scored 32 runs with a highest innings of 10.
