= John Earle (divine) =

English Catholic priest and theologian

John Earle (1749–1818), was an English Catholic priest and theologian.

== Life ==
Earle was born in London on 31 December 1749. Educated at the English College, Douay in France, he became one of the officiating priests at the chapel of the Spanish ambassador in Dorset Street, Manchester Square, London.

Earle died in London on 15 May 1818.

== Works ==
- 'Gratitude', a poem in commemoration of the partial repeal of the penal laws in 1791.
- 'Remarks on the Prefaces prefixed to the first and second volumes of a work entitled "The Holy Bible; or the Books accounted sacred by Jews and Christians, faithfully translated, &c., by the Rev. Alexander Geddes, LL.D.,”, in four Letters addressed to him by the Rev. John Earle,’ London, 1799, 8vo.
