= John Adamthwaite =

English cricketer (1810–1870)

Personal information
- Born: 24 June 1810; Manchester, Lancashire, England
- Died: 7 May 1870 (aged 69); Checkley, Staffordshire, England
- Batting: Unknown

Career statistics
Competition	First-class
Matches	1
Runs scored	1
Batting average	0.50
100s/50s	–/–
Top score	1
Balls bowled	–
Wickets	–
Bowling average	–
5 wickets in innings	–
10 wickets in match	–
Best bowling	–
Catches/stumpings	–/–
- Source: Cricinfo, 25 July 2013

John Adamthwaite (24 June 1810 – 7 May 1870) was an English first-class cricketer from Manchester, Lancashire. Adamthwaite's batting style is unknown.

Adamthwaite made a single first-class appearance for Manchester against Yorkshire in 1845 at Moss Lane, Manchester. In a match which Yorkshire won by an innings and 67 runs, Adamthwaite was dismissed for a single run in Manchester's first-innings by Henry Sampson, while in their second-innings he was dismissed for a duck by John Ibbetson.

He died at Checkley, Staffordshire on 7 May 1870.
