= Edmund Rowley =

English cricketer (1842–1905)

Edmund Butler Rowley (4 May 1842 – 8 February 1905) was an English cricketer active from 1860 to 1880 who played for Lancashire and was the original club captain from institution of the post in 1866 until 1879. He was born in Manchester and died in Chorlton-on-Medlock. He appeared in 89 first-class matches as a righthanded batsman who sometimes kept wicket. He scored 1,853 runs with a highest score of 78 and completed 19 catches with one stumping.
