= Ernest Rowley =

English cricketer (1870–1962)

Ernest Butler Rowley (15 January 1870 – 4 October 1962) was an English cricketer active from 1893 to 1898 who played for Lancashire.

Rowley was educated at Clifton College and Oriel College, Oxford. He became a solicitor and public notary. He was born and died in Manchester. He appeared in 17 first-class matches as a righthanded batsman, scoring 586 runs with a highest score of 65 and held four catches.
