= Alexander Rowley =

English cricketer

Alexander Butler Rowley (3 October 1837 – 9 January 1911) was an English first-class cricketer active from 1854 to 1871 who played for Lancashire. He was born in Manchester and died in Dover. He appeared in 31 first-class matches as a right-handed batsman who bowled left arm slow medium roundarm. He scored 967 runs with a highest score of 63 not out and took 78 wickets with a best performance of six for 21.

== Parliamentary candidate ==
Rowley stood as the Liberal candidate in Ashton-under-Lyne at the 1886 general election. He received the same number of votes as the only other candidate in the seat, incumbent Conservative Party MP John Addison, but lost the election after the returning officer gave his casting vote to Addison.
