= William Kington =

English cricketer

Personal information
- Born: 24 September 1838; Bristol, England
- Died: 21 April 1898 (aged 59); Montreux, Switzerland
- Batting: Right-handed

Domestic team information
- Years: Team
- 1858: Manchester
- 1875–1876: Gloucestershire
- Source: Cricinfo, 4 April 2014

William Miles Nairne Kington (24 September 1838 – 21 April 1898) was an English army officer and cricketer.

He was the son of Thomas Kington, the younger (1796–1857), and was educated at Harrow School. In 1858 he was a cornet in the 5th Dragoon Guards. In 1864 he was a captain. He became lieutenant-colonel in the 4th Hussars, and retired in 1880.

Kington played cricket for Manchester in the 1858 season and later for Gloucestershire in 1875 and 1876.
