= Botanical Gardens Cricket Ground =

Cricket ground

Coordinates: 53.46184°N 2.28402°W

- Interactive map of Botanical Gardens Cricket Ground

Ground information
- Location: Old Trafford, Stretford, Lancashire
- Country: England
- Establishment: 1848 (first recorded match)

Team information
Manchester Cricket Club	(1848, 1852 & 1854)
Lancashire	(1849 & 1851)
- As of 5 September 2010; Source: Ground profile

Botanical Gardens Cricket Ground was a cricket ground in Old Trafford, Stretford, Lancashire. The ground was located adjacent to Manchester Botanical Garden. The ground was on land owned by Sir Humphrey de Trafford, who allowed Manchester Cricket Club to lease the ground.

The first recorded match that is now considered to have been first-class on the ground was in 1848, when Manchester Cricket Club played Sheffield Cricket Club. The following season Lancashire played Yorkshire. In 1851, Lancashire played their second and final first-class match at the ground in a repeat of the previous first-class fixture there involving. Manchester played two further first-class matches at the ground in 1852 and then 1854, both against Sheffield.

The final recorded match held on the ground was in 1856 when Manchester Cricket Club played Rugby. Shortly afterwards, the ground was redeveloped for the 1857 Art Treasures Exhibition. Later, the location became a motorcycle speedway venue before closing in 1982. Today, it is covered by the White City Retail Centre.
