= Manchester Cricket Club =

English cricket club

Manchester Cricket Club was founded in 1816 and was a direct forerunner of Lancashire County Cricket Club which was founded in 1864. Important Manchester matches were mostly played between 1844 and 1858, after which it was superseded by the county club.

== History ==
Cricket may not have reached Lancashire until the 18th century. The earliest known reference to cricket being played in the county is in 1781. In 1816, Manchester Cricket Club was founded and soon became the most important team within the county in the same way that Sheffield Cricket Club and Nottingham Cricket Club were in Yorkshire and Nottinghamshire.

Manchester played mostly against opponents from the north of England and 13 of its matches between 1844 and 1858 were important. Four other matches were played between 1849 and 1851 between Manchester and Sheffield teams who were called Lancashire and Yorkshire.

In their early years, the club played their cricket at the Crescent in Salford and afterwards at Moss Lane (here a match against an All England was played in the 1840s; it is said that an XI who played a match at Lord's in 1842 were defeated because they bowled underarm) and subsequently on land adjacent to the Manchester Botanical Garden and leased from the Trafford family. In 1856, Sir Humphrey de Trafford identified this land as being an ideal location for the planned Manchester Art and Treasures Exhibition and offered Manchester Cricket Club £500 in compensation for the remainder of their lease. The club, however, insisted on a figure of £1,000 and agreed to vacate the site ahead of the 1857 season, moving to the ground which subsequently became Old Trafford Cricket Ground, the home of Lancashire cricket.

Lancashire County Cricket Club was formally constituted on 12 January 1864 at a meeting of thirteen Lancashire cricket clubs in Manchester. In 1865, the new club joined the County Championship and played its first match against Middlesex at Old Trafford on 20, 21 and 22 July. The Manchester club was superseded by the county club and ceased to have important match status in its own right.

== Bibliography ==
- Bowen, Rowland (1970). Cricket: A History of its Growth and Development. London: Eyre & Spottiswoode. ISBN 978-04-13278-60-9.
- Buckley, G. B. (1937). Fresh Light on pre-Victorian Cricket. Birmingham: Cotterell & Co. OCLC 23469107.
- Haygarth, Arthur (1862–1870). Scores & Biographies, Volumes 1-8 (1744–1864). Lillywhite.
