= List of Cambridge Town Club and Cambridgeshire cricketers =

This is a list of cricketers who played for either Cambridge Town Club (CTC) or the original Cambridgeshire County Cricket Club in historically important matches between 1817 and 1863, and in a handful of first-class matches between 1864 and 1871. (Note: Any match listed in the ACS' Important Match Guide (1981) is historically important, and therefore of the highest standard, whether or not a scorecard might exist. The same applies to numerous matches discovered by researchers since 1981. For further information, see First-class cricket.) Anyone who played for teams with the alternate titles of Cambridge Union Club (1826–1833), Cambridge Townsmen (one match only in 1848), and the Cambridge Town and County Club (1844–1856) are included, all these being variations of CTC.

The Town Club was formed before 1817. The original county club was formally established in March 1844 but folded in 1868, although a handful of Cambridgeshire matches were played until 1871. The modern county club, which plays in the Minor Counties Championship, was founded in June 1891. Cambridge University Cricket Club co-existed in its early years, but has always been a separate entity.

The details are the player's usual name followed by the years in which he played important and/or first-class matches for one of the teams, and then his name is given as it would appear on a modern match scorecard. Some players also played for the university, and many players represented other teams outside Cambridgeshire. Six Cambridgeshire players were part of the combined Cambridgeshire & Yorkshire team which played against Kent & Nottinghamshire in 1864.

== A ==
- James Adams (1830) : J. Adams
- Thomas Anson (1840–1841) : T. A. Anson
- Ralph Arber (1871) : R. H. Arber
- Charles Arnold (1842–1860) : C. Arnold
- Mark Arnold (1848–1855) : M. Arnold
- William Austin (1827–1828) : W. Austin

== B ==
- Charles Barker (1861) : C. Barker
- William Batchelor (1868) : W. J. Batchelor (Note: William Batchelor (1846–1917) played in two first-class matches for Cambridgeshire in 1868. He attended Emmanuel College at Cambridge University, and was a clergyman.)
- Baxter (1819–1822) : Baxter
- Robert Bayford (1858) : R. A. Bayford
- Frederick Bell (1846–1864) : F. W. Bell
- Augustus Berry (1862) : A. G. Berry (Note: Augustus Berry (1833–1888) was born in Thriplow and died in Cambridge. He played in four important matches for Cambridgeshire in 1862, and may have been a professional cricketer employed by the University.)
- Edmund Bilton (1859–1866) : E. J. Bilton
- Henry Bird (1819–1826) : H. Bird
- William Bird (1821–1822) : W. Bird
- John Boning (1822–1849) : J. Boning
- George Boudier (1843) : G. J. Boudier
- Samuel Bowtell (1830–1838) : S. Bowtell
- Thomas Box (1846) : T. Box
- Charles Brereton (1858) : C. J. Brereton
- Bridges (1819–1820) : Bridges
- Robert Broughton (1838) : R. J. P. Broughton
- Horace Browne (1865–1869) : H. J. Browne
- Samuel Bullock (1825–1827) : S. Bullock
- J. Burbage (1825) : J. Burbage
- William Buttress (1848–1861) : W. Buttress

== C ==
- Will Caldecourt (1832–1838) : W. H. Caldecourt
- George Carpenter (1838–1844) : G. Carpenter
- Robert Carpenter (1855–1871) : R. P. Carpenter (Note: Robert Carpenter, Alfred Diver, and Tom Hayward were members of the England team which toured North America in 1859.)
- William Carpenter (1843) : W. Carpenter
- William Chapman (1853) : W. H. Chapman
- Robert Collier (1866–1867) : R. Collier
- Charles Cooke (1858) : C. R. Cooke
- Edward Cornwell (1851–1863) : E. Cornwell
- Henry Cornwell (1844–1849) : H. Cornwell
- William Cornwell (1864–1868) : W. Cornwell (Note: William Cornwell (1838–1915) was born and died in Bottisham. He played for Cambridgeshire five times between 1864 and 1868.)
- George Edward Cotterill (1858) : G. E. Cotterill
- St Vincent Cotton (1832–1834) : S. Cotton
- Edward Cowell (1867) : E. Cowell
- C. Cox (1861) : C. Cox
- George Craggs (1852–1853) : G. R. Craggs
- Cropley (1822) : Cropley
- John Crouch (1826–1836) : J. Crouch

== D ==
- Samuel Dakin (1853) : S. Dakin
- Dalby (1820) : Dalby
- Darby (1840) : Darby
- James Dark (1819) : J. H. Dark
- J. Davies (1825–1832) : J. Davies
- William de St Croix (1840) : W. de St Croix
- Alfred Diver (1843–1866) : A. J. D. Diver
- Duke (1831) : Duke
- John Durnford (1825) : J. Durnford

== E ==
- Octavius Eaden (1826–1831) : O. Eaden
- David Edwards (1826–1844) : D. B. Edwards
- W. Edwards (1832–1843) : W. Edwards
- Henry Ellis (1864) : H. W. Ellis (Note: Henry Ellis (1840–1902) played in a single first-class match for Cambridgeshire in 1864.)
- J. Ellis (1861) : J. Ellis
- John Emmerson (1826–1831) : J. Emmerson
- William Emmerson (1829) : W. H. Emmerson

== F ==
- Arthur Farmer (1838) : A. A. Farmer
- Francis Fenner (1829–1860) : F. P. Fenner
- George Fenner (1821) : G. Fenner
- James Fenner (1821) : J. Fenner
- Harry Few (1866) : H. G. Few
- James Fordham (1865–1869) : J. Fordham
- Henry Staples Foster (1844–1848) : H. S. Foster
- Henry Francis (1849–1862) : H. C. Francis (Note: Henry Francis (1826–1866) was born in Southwold and died in Godmanchester. He was probably engaged as a professional cricketer at Cambridge University.)
- F. French (1858)
- John French (1864) : J. French
- Thomas French (1843) : T. L. French
- Thomas Fryer (1832) : T. S. Fryer
- Henry Fuller (1841) : H. W. Fuller
- J. Fuller (1831–1834) : J. Fuller
- John Fuller (1857–1858) : J. M. Fuller

== G ==
- Robert Glasscock (1832–1834) : R. Glasscock
- Henry Gray (1859–1861) : H. Gray
- Joseph Grout (1838) : J. Grout

== H ==
- Hagger (1845) : Hagger
- Israel Haggis (1834–1849) : I. Haggis
- James Hall (1821–1838) : J. Hall
- W. Hall (1833–1834) : W. Hall
- William Hammersley (1847–1849) : W. J. Hammersley
- Octavius Hammond (1857) : O. Hammond
- Henry Hand (1840) : H. G. Hand
- Hayes (1851) : Hayes
- Tom Hayward (1854–1871) : T. Hayward
- Daniel Hayward Jr (1852–1869) : D. Hayward Jr
- Daniel Hayward Sr (1830–1851) : D. Hayward Sr
- Edward Herbert, 3rd Earl of Powis (1837–1838) : E. J. Herbert
- Henry Hills (1866–1868) : H. Hills
- William Hillyer (1846) : W. R. Hillyer
- Arthur Hoare (1844–1847) : A. M. Hoare
- J. Horn (1827) : J. Horn
- Edward Horne (1858) : E. L. Horne
- William Hutt (1842) : W. W. Hutt

== J ==
- James Jiggins (1854–1861) : J. Jiggins (Note: James Jiggins (1838–1909) played four matches for Cambridgeshire or CTC between 1854 and 1861.)
- William Jiggins (1859) : W. Jiggins
- George Randall Johnson (1857) : G. R. Johnson
- T. Johnson (1825–1834) : T. Johnson
- W. Johnston (1837–1838) : W. Johnston
- G. Jones (1839) : G. Jones

== K ==
- John King (1861–1864) : J. King
- Robert Turner King (1846–1847) : R. T. King
- John Kirwan (1840) : J. H. Kirwan

== L ==
- James Lawrence (1820) : J. Lawrence
- John Lee (1847) : J. M. Lee
- Richard Lenton (1828–1844) : R. D. Lenton
- William Lillywhite (1841) : F. W. Lillywhite
- Frederick Long (1841) : F. E. Long

== M ==
- Joseph Makinson (1857–1858) : J. Makinson
- Charles Marshall (1868) : C. J. Marshall
- Charles Marshall (1866) : C. Marshall
- John Marshall (1857–1867) : J. H. Marshall
- Joseph Marshall (1857) : J. W. Marshall
- Marshall (1839) : Marshall
- W. Martin (1819–1826) : W. Martin
- Henry Mason (1869–1871) : H. Mason
- William Massey (1838) : W. Massey
- Albert Masterson (1867–1871) : A. E. G. W. Masterson
- Joseph Masterson (1859–1861) : J. Masterson
- Medlicott (1819–1822) : Medlicott
- T. Metcalfe (1830) : T. Metcalfe
- Miller (1828) : Miller
- William Mills (1840–1843) : W. Mills
- H. Morgan (1836–1837) : H. Morgan
- Mott (1820) : Mott
- George Muncey (1860–1866) : G. Muncey
- Daniel Murcutt (1837–1842) : D. D. Murcutt
- Robert Murcutt (1819–1820) : R. Murcutt

== N ==
- William Newby (1858) : W. J. Newby
- Charles Newman (1860–1869) : C. Newman
- William Newman (1867–1871) : W. Newman (Note: William Newman (1837–1897) was born and died in Cambridge. He played in five first-class matches for Cambridgeshire between 1867 and 1871.)
- Thomas Bartrup Nichols (1868) : T. B. Nichols
- Frederick Norman (1858) : F. H. Norman

== O ==
- Frederick Odams (1867) : F. W. Odams (Note: Frederick Odams (1843–1879) played two first-class matches for Cambridgeshire in 1867. He is known to have also played for the travelling elevens.)
- Owen (1819–1821) : Owen

== P ==
- Henry Page (1819–1826) : H. Page
- John Page (1819–1822) : J. Page
- Martin Page (1820–1836) : M. Page
- Henry Parker (1840) : H. Parker
- Oliver Pell (1846–1848) : O. C. Pell
- Henry Perkins (1857–1866) : H. Perkins
- John Perkins (1861–1867) : J. Perkins
- William Pickering (1843) : W. P. Pickering
- Fuller Pilch (1832) : F. Pilch
- James Piper (1860–1861) : J. P. Piper
- Frederick Ponsonby (1840) : F. G. B. Ponsonby
- Porter (1833)
- Edward Prest (1852–1854) : E. B. Prest
- William Prest (1852–1862) : W. P. Prest
- Charles Pryor (1833–1860) : C. S. Pryor
- Frederick Pryor (1861–1871) : F. C. Pryor
- Stephen Pryor (1820) : S. Pryor

== R ==
- Sam Redgate (1839) : S. Redgate
- Ambrose Redhead (1829–1831) : A. G. Redhead
- Frederick Reynolds (1854–1867) : F. R. Reynolds
- Thomas Reynolds (1857–1858) : T. P. Reynolds
- Robert Ringwood (1840–1849) : R. Ringwood
- Alfred Rowe (1859) : A. W. Rowe

== S ==
- Salmoni (1831) : Salmoni
- Henry Saunders (1865–1866) : H. B. Saunders
- William Saunders (1865) : W. Saunders
- Edward Sayres (1838) : E. Sayres
- Avison Scott (1867–1871) : A. T. Scott
- J. Scott (1819–1831) : J. Scott
- Thomas Sell (1826–1833) : T. Sell
- Walter Sell (1851–1852) : W. Sell
- James Seymour (1834–1836) : J. F. Seymour
- Matthew Seymour (1860–1863) : M. Seymour
- George Smith (1868–1871) : G. Smith
- John Smith (1863–1871) : J. Smith
- Smith (1826–1827) : Smith
- Thomas Snow (1844) : T. Snow
- Sprig (1831) : Sprig
- J. Stearn (1834) : J. Stearn
- Thomas Stearn (1821–1840) : T. Stearn
- George Sussum (1826–1832) : G. Sussum
- J. Swan (1825–1826) : J. Swan

== T ==
- Edward Tarrant (1866) : E. Tarrant
- George Tarrant (1861–1868) : G. F. Tarrant
- Charles Taylor (1838) : C. G. Taylor
- Charles Thackeray (1854) : C. Thackeray
- Frederick Thackeray (1841–1854) : F. Thackeray
- Arthur Tharp (1868–1871) : A. K. Tharp
- Alfred Tillard (1868) : A. E. Tillard
- Thomas Townley (1846–1852) : T. M. Townley

== W ==
- Ward (1842) : Ward
- Townsend Warner (1860) : G. T. Warner senior
- Charles Warren (1865–1867) : C. Warren
- Walter Watts (1866–1869) : W. Watts
- Webb (1839–1841) : Webb
- Ned Wenman (1840) : E. G. Wenman
- Wicks (1820) : Wicks
- Edward Wilkins (1858) : E. J. P. Wilkins
- William Wingfield (1857) : W. Wingfield
- Charles Winterton (1839–1861) : W. C. Winterton

== Bibliography ==
- ACS (1981). A Guide to Important Cricket Matches Played in the British Isles 1709–1863. Nottingham: ACS. OCLC 85045528.
- ACS (1982). A Guide to First-class Cricket Matches Played in the British Isles. Nottingham: ACS. OCLC 10586869.
