= Murcutt =

Murcutt is a surname. Notable people with the surname include:

- Daniel Murcutt (1817–1853), English cricketer
- Glenn Murcutt (born 1936), Australian architect
- Nick Murcutt (1964–2011), Australian architect
- Robert Murcutt (c. 1791–1835), English cricketer

== See also ==
- Murcott (disambiguation)
