= Bowtell (surname) =

Bowtell is a surname, and may refer to:

- Alby Bowtell (1887–1948), Australian rules footballer
- Amy Bowtell (born 1993), Irish tennis player
- Ann Bowtell (born 1938), British Civil Service Commissioner
- John Bowtell (1753–1813), English topographer
- Lyn Bowtell (born 1977), Australian singer-songwriter
- Samuel Bowtell (1806–1881), English cricketer
- Steve Bowtell (born 1950), English football goalkeeper
- Wally Bowtell (1895–1975), Australian rules footballer
