= Israel Haggis =

English cricketer and publican

Personal information
- Full name: Israel Haggis
- Born: 23 January 1811; Cambridge, Cambridgeshire, England
- Died: 9 August 1849 (aged 38); Cambridge, Cambridgeshire, England
- Height: 5 ft 8 in (1.73 m)
- Batting: Unknown
- Bowling: Unknown

Domestic team information
- Years: Team
- 1834–1849: Cambridge Town Club

Career statistics
Competition	First-class
Matches	20
Runs scored	306
Batting average	10.92
100s/50s	–/–
Top score	36*
Balls bowled	?
Wickets	1
Bowling average	?
5 wickets in innings	–
10 wickets in match	–
Best bowling	1/?
Catches/stumpings	13/–
- Source: Cricinfo, 7 April 2022

Israel Haggis (23 January 1811 — 9 August 1849) was an English first-class cricketer and publican.

Haggis was born at Cambridge in January 1811. A club cricketer for Chesterton Cricket Club, he was first chosen to play for the Cambridge Town Club in a first-class match against Cambridge University at Parker's Piece in 1834. From 1836, he became a regular feature in Cambridgeshire representative sides, making 19 appearances for the county to 1849. By 1841, his reputation and connection to Francis Fenner saw Haggis gain a place in an England team which played Kent in a first-class match at Bromley. He was described as a cricketer by Denison as being "distinguished for his excellence in the field, and the exhibition of much liveliness when batting", with it also being noted that his liveliness when batting led to his susceptibility to be out caught. In his 20 first-class appearances, Haggis scored 306 runs at an average of 10.92. His highest score of 36 not out was made against Cambridge University in 1837. In the field he took 13 catches.

Outside of cricket, Haggis was a licensed victualler and later a publican. He had a reputation in Cambridge for trouble. In 1836, he was charged with selling spirits without a license at the Stourbridge fair, with Haggis also being the victim of assault in the same year. Around this time he was the proprietor of The Flower, before moving to The Six Bells in Covent Garden in 1837. He became the landlord of The New Inn on Parker's Piece by 1844, and was later landlord at The Tiger on East Road and The Salmon on Fair Street. From The New Inn he began selling cricket bats, balls and newly-invented pads, which he had purchased on a trip to London from James Cobbett, Will Caldecourt and Robert Dark, brother of James and Benjamin. Haggis managed the cricketing affairs of St John's College on Parker's Piece, having in his employment fellow cricketer Robert Ringwood. He was civically active in Cambridge, petitioning for reform of Parliament, in addition to donating a large sum of money for the restoration of St Botolph's Church.

He had a somewhat tumultuous relationship with his wife, Sarah, whom he had married in 1836. She eloped in 1843, seemingly with his manservant Alfred Hutt, to Hammersmith. Haggis located the pair, where he discovered cricket equipment which had been taken by Hutt, with Hutt being tried for theft in January 1844 and found not guilty. Haggis died from cholera on 9 August 1849, having eaten contaminated salmon which he had purchased two days previously while in London. He was transported to Cambridge, where his condition deteriorated and he died within an hour of his return to the city.
