= Henry Fuller =

Henry or Harry Fuller may refer to:

- Henry Mills Fuller (1820–1860), American Whig politician who represented Pennsylvania's 11th congressional district (1851–1853, 1855–1857)
- Henry Blake Fuller (1857–1929), American novelist, short story writer and playwright, associated with Chicago
- Henry Brown Fuller (1867–1934), American artist
- Henry Robert Fuller (1825–1905), mayor of the City of Adelaide (1866–1869)
- Henry William Fuller (1820–1873), English physician and writer
- H. E. Fuller (Henry Ernest Fuller, 1867–1962), architect in South Australia
- Harry Fuller (baseball) (1862–1895), baseball player
- Harry Fuller (cricketer) (1896–1974), South African cricketer
