= Arthur Hoare =

Arthur Hoare may refer to:

- Arthur Hoare (cricketer, born 1821) (1821–1894), English cricketer
- Arthur Hoare (cricketer, born 1840) (1840–1896), English cricketer
- Arthur Hoare (cricketer, born 1871) (1871–1941), English cricketer and clergyman
