= Richard Adams (cricketer) =

English cricketer

Personal information
- Full name: Richard Leonard Adams
- Born: 29 March 1838; Bath, Somerset, England
- Died: 11 April 1897 (aged 59); Cockington, Devon, England
- Batting: Unknown
- Bowling: Unknown

Domestic team information
- Years: Team
- 1859: Cambridge University

Career statistics
Competition	First-class
Matches	1
Runs scored	1
Batting average	1.00
100s/50s	–/–
Top score	1
Balls bowled	?
Wickets	2
Bowling average	?
5 wickets in innings	–
10 wickets in match	–
Best bowling	2/?
Catches/stumpings	1/–
- Source: Cricinfo, 20 October 2013

Richard Leonard Adams (29 March 1838 – 11 April 1897) was an English first-class cricketer. Adams's batting and bowling styles are unknown.

Adams was born at Bath, Somerset, and educated at Westminster School. He later studied at Christ's College, Cambridge, where he made a single appearance in first-class cricket for the university cricket club against Cambridge Town Club at Parker's Piece in 1859. He batted once during Cambridge University's first-innings, scoring a single run before he was dismissed by Frederick Reynolds. He took the wickets of Charles Pryor and Joseph Masterson in the Cambridge Town Club first-innings, however due to an incomplete match scorecard his exact bowling figures are unknown.

Adams became an Anglican priest and was vicar of Framfield 1866–76, then rector of Shere 1876–93. He died at Cockington, Devon on 11 April 1897.
