= Martin Page (disambiguation) =

Martin Page (born 1959) is an English musician.

Martin Page may also refer to:

- Martin Page (cricketer) (1800–1874), English cricketer
- Martin Page (French author) (born 1975), French author of How I Became Stupid
- Martin Page (botanist) (born 1953), English botanist, ecologist and plant photographer
- Martin Page (British author) (1938–2003), British writer and journalist
