= Thomas Fryer =

English cricketer

Personal information
- Full name: Thomas Skeeles Fryer
- Born: 30 June 1793; Chatteris, Cambridgeshire, England
- Died: 1 September 1861 (aged 68); Hemingford Abbots, Huntingdonshire, England
- Batting: Unknown

Domestic team information
- Years: Team
- 1832: Cambridge Town Club

Career statistics
Competition	First-class
Matches	2
Runs scored	0
Batting average	0.00
100s/50s	–/–
Top score	0
Catches/stumpings	3/–
- Source: Cricinfo, 11 March 2022

Thomas Skeeles Fryer DL JP (30 June 1793 — 1 September 1861) was an English first-class cricketer.

The son of Daniel Dryer and Elizabeth Skeeles, he was born at Chatteris in June 1793. By profession, he was a brewer and later a brickmaker. Fryer was appointed Sheriff of Cambridgeshire and Huntingdonshire in January 1826. He had a keen interest in cricket and was president of Chatteris Cricket Club; during his presidency the club was ambitious and engaged many of the leading Cambridgeshire cricketers of the time, including Daniel Hayward, Robert Glasscock and Francis Fenner. Fryer himself played first-class cricket for Cambridge Town Club twice against the Marylebone Cricket Club (MCC) in 1832. The first of these was played at Lord's, while the second was played at Chatteris. However, Fryer failed to score any runs in the two innings in which he batted. In later life he was a deputy lieutenant for Cambridgeshire and Huntingdonshire, and was additionally a justice of the peace for the two counties. In August 1859, he was declared bankrupt. Fryer died in September 1861 at Hemingford Abbots, Huntingdonshire.
