= William Newby =

William Newby may refer to:

- William Newby (Cambridgeshire cricketer) (1836–1932), English cricketer
- William Newby (South African cricketer) (1855–1921), South African cricketer
