= Charles Newman (cricketer) =

English cricketer

Personal information
- Full name: Charles Newman
- Born: 7 August 1839; Cambridge, Cambridgeshire, England
- Died: 23 April 1883 (aged 43); Barnwell, Cambridgeshire, England
- Batting: Right-handed

Domestic team information
- Years: Team
- 1861–1869: Cambridgeshire

Career statistics
Competition	First-class
Matches	17
Runs scored	195
Batting average	6.50
100s/50s	–/–
Top score	32
Catches/stumpings	8/–
- Source: Cricinfo, 12 February 2022

Charles Newman (7 August 1839 — 23 April 1883) was an English first-class cricketer.

Newman was born at Cambridge in August 1839. Newman made his debut in first-class cricket for Cambridge Town Club against Cambridge University at Fenner's in 1860. He played for a Cambridgeshire representative team in first-class cricket until 1869, making a total of sixteen appearances. Newman also made one appearance for the United England Eleven against an All-England Eleven in 1863 at Lord's. Playing as a batsman, Newman scored 195 runs in seventeen first-class matches, at an average of 6.50 and with a highest score of 32. Newman was involved in controversy in the Cambridgeshire v Middlesex match of 1866, when he was a substitute for Robert Carpenter, who had been injured while fielding in the Middlesex first innings; as was the etiquette at the time, substitutes were permitted to field, but not bat. However, Newman batted in the Cambridgeshire first innings, which incurred the protest of his teammate George Tarrant, who refused to continue playing in the match and was absent in Cambridgeshire's first innings and when they followed-on in their second innings. He died in April 1883, aged 43, at Barnwell in Cambridge.
