= Haigis =

Haigis is a surname. Notable people with the surname include:

- Anne Haigis (born 1955), German musician, singer and songwriter
- John W. Haigis (1881–1960), American newspaper publisher, businessman and politician
- Marcia Haigis, American biologist and professor

== See also ==
- Haig (disambiguation)
- Haggis (disambiguation)
