= Ernest Fuller =

English cricketer and clergyman

Personal information
- Full name: Ernest Adolphus Fuller
- Born: 25 March 1831; London, England
- Died: 8 April 1901 (aged 70); Carlisle, Cumberland, England
- Batting: Unknown
- Relatives: Henry Fuller (brother)

Domestic team information
- Years: Team
- 1852: Cambridge University

Career statistics
Competition	First-class
Matches	1
Runs scored	0
Batting average	0.00
100s/50s	–/–
Top score	0*
Catches/stumpings	–/–
- Source: Cricinfo, 18 January 2022

Ernest Adolphus Fuller (25 March 1831 – 8 April 1901) was an English first-class cricketer and clergyman.

The son of the surgeon Henry Peter Fuller, and his wife, Matilda Juliana, he was born at London in March 1831. Fuller was educated at both Rugby School and The King's School in Rochester, before matriculating to Emmanuel College, Cambridge. While studying at Cambridge, he made a single appearance in first-class cricket for Cambridge University Cricket Club in the 1852 University Match against Oxford at Lord's. He batted twice during the match, recording scores of 0 in both innings', with Fuller being dismissed Philip Sankey in the Cambridge first innings, while following-on in their second innings, he ended it not out, with Oxford winning by an innings and 77 runs. His appearance gained him a cricket blue.

After graduating from Cambridge, Fuller was ordained as a deacon at Gloucester Cathedral in 1853. In December 1854, he became a priest and was appointed curate at Cirencester, where he was to remain until 1856. From there he proceeded to the Gloucestershire village of Colesbourne, where he was curate from 1856 to 1864. He returned to Cirencester once more as curate from 1864 to 1870. Fuller was appointed vicar at St Barnabas's Church in Bristol in 1870, a position he held until 1890. While vicar at St Barnabas's, Fuller commented on incest in Victorian England and noted how he had observed families erecting curtains to partition to rooms to provide privacy for female family members in one-room households. In retirement, Fuller moved north to Carlisle, where he died in April 1901. His brother was Henry William Fuller, the noted writer and physician, who also played first-class cricket. On his maternal side, his grandfather was Joseph Wratislaw of Mitrovice, who was the Supreme Marshal of the Kingdom of Bohemia.
