= Thomas French (cricketer) =

English clergyman, landowner, and cricketer

Thomas Lee French (10 June 1821 – 7 April 1909) was an English landowner and clergyman who played first-class cricket for Cambridge University and Cambridge Town and minor cricket for amateur teams in East Anglia. He was born at Eye, Suffolk and died at Menton in the south of France.

As a cricketer, French appeared for Cambridge University between 1841 and 1844. He played three times in the university match against Oxford University, being joint captain with George Boudier in 1843 when his 32 in the second innings of a low-scoring game contributed to a Cambridge victory. French appears to have been regarded largely as a batsman, though it is not known whether he was right- or left-handed, but he also kept wicket on occasion and took two recorded wickets as a bowler in first-class games. After leaving Cambridge University, his cricket was confined to lesser matches, but as late as 1878, when he was 57, he was playing for Suffolk in a two-day match, albeit not successfully.

French was ordained as a Church of England clergyman when he left Cambridge and from 1845 to his death he was the rector of Thrandeston, Suffolk. The post was a benefice in the gift of the Bateman family who owned nearby Brome Hall. French himself was also an extensive landowner and held public and judicial office: he was reported to be the last Freeman of Eye, chairman of the local Poor Law Trust and a member of the East Suffolk County Council.
