= Henry Francis =

Henry Francis may refer to:

- Henry M. Francis, American architect in Massachusetts
- Henry Francis (cricketer), English cricketer and umpire
