= Frederick Pryor =

Frederick Pryor may refer to:

- Frederic Pryor (1933–2019), American economist
- Frederick Pryor (cricketer) (1844–?), English cricketer
