= Walter Watts =

Walter Watts may refer to:

- Walter Watts (cricketer) (1827–1910), English cricketer
- Walter Henry Watts (1776–1842), English miniature painter and journalist
- Wally Watts (1872–1946), Australian sportsman
