= William Cornwell =

William Cornwell may refer to:

- William Cornwell (cricketer) (1838–1915), English cricketer
- William B. Cornwell (1864–1926), American lawyer, businessman and publisher in West Virginia
- William H. Cornwell (1843–1903), American businessman and Hawaiian politician
- William J. Cornwell (1809–1896), American lawyer and politician from New York
