= William Hutt (cricketer) =

English cricketer, clergyman and academic

Personal information
- Full name: William Wayman Hutt
- Born: 29 August 1822; Cambridge, Cambridgeshire, England
- Died: 21 July 1894 (aged 71); Hockwold cum Wilton, Norfolk, England
- Batting: Unknown

Domestic team information
- Years: Team
- 1842: Cambridge Town Club

Career statistics
Competition	First-class
Matches	1
Runs scored	0
Batting average	0.00
100s/50s	–/–
Top score	0*
Catches/stumpings	–/–
- Source: Cricinfo, 24 May 2022

William Wayman Hutt JP (29 August 1822 – 21 July 1894) was an English first-class cricketer, clergyman and academic.

The son of Richard Hutt, a bookseller from Cambridge, he was born in August 1822. Hutt was educated at The Perse School, before matriculating to Caius College, Cambridge. While studying at Cambridge he was active in the Cambridge Town Club (CTC), for whom he made a single appearance in first-class cricket for against Cambridge University at Parker's Piece in 1842. He was dismissed once in the match batting from the tail by John Kirwan in the CTC first innings.

Hutt was elected a fellow of Caius in 1845, an appointment he was re-elected to in May 1854. During the early 1850s, he held the office of college divinity lecturer, after the office had been declined by other fellows. He had been ordained as a deacon at Ely Cathedral in 1846 and was appointed a priest there in 1847. Following the end of his academic commitments with Caius, Hutt was appointed rector at Hockwold cum Wilton in 1861 and was made an honorary canon at Norwich Cathedral in 1890. Hutt co-authored the book Solutions of Goodwin's Collection of Problems and Examples alongside Thomas Vyvyan in 1863, which detailed mathematical problems and their solutions. In his later years he was a justice of the peace for the Norfolk. Hutt remained rector at Hockwold cum Wilton until his death there in July 1894.
