= Charles Arnold =

Charles or Chuck Arnold may refer to:

- Charles N. Arnold (1880–1929), mayor of Honolulu
- Charles Arnold (cricketer) (1823–1873), English cricketer
- Chuck Arnold (racing driver) (Charles Russell Arnold, 1926–1997), American racing driver
- Chuck Arnold (American football) (Charles Arnold), American football executive
