= Charles Winterton =

English cricketer

Personal information
- Full name: William Charles Winterton
- Born: 2 June 1822; Thurmaston, Leicestershire, England
- Died: 8 December 1898 (aged 76); Rothley, Leicestershire, England
- Batting: Right-handed
- Bowling: Right-arm roundarm fast
- Role: Wicket-keeper

Career statistics
Competition	First-class
Matches	18
Runs scored	170
Batting average	7.39
100s/50s	–/–
Top score	27
Balls bowled	?
Wickets	4
Bowling average	?
5 wickets in innings	–
10 wickets in match	–
Best bowling	3/?
Catches/stumpings	11/3
- Source: Cricinfo, 13 February 2022

William Charles Winterton (2 June 1822 — 8 December 1898) was an English first-class cricketer.

Winterton was born at the Leicestershire village of Thurmaston in June 1822. He was an important figure in Cambridge cricket, making his debut in first-class cricket for the Cambridge Town Club against Cambridge University as 17–year old in 1839 at Parker's Piece. Winterton played first-class cricket over a period of 22 years, making 18 appearances. His opportunities in the Cambridge side had become lessened by the emergence of Daniel Hayward in the early 1850s. Playing as a wicket-keeper, he was described in James Pycroft's 1854 edition of The Cricket Field as a cricketer who "carries great weight with him at the wicket". In 18 first-class matches, Winterton scored 170 runs at an average of 7.39, with a highest score of 27. As a wicket-keeper he also made three stumpings. Winterton was also a useful right-arm roundarm fast bowler, taking 4 wickets in first-class cricket. He died in Leicestershire at Rothley in December 1898.
