= Covent Garden (disambiguation) =

Covent Garden is a district of London.

Covent Garden may also refer to:

- Covent Garden, Cambridge, a street in Cambridge, England
- Covent Garden Hotel, a hotel in the Covent Garden district
- Covent Garden tube station, the underground railway station for the district
- Holborn and Covent Garden (ward), an electoral ward covering parts of Covent Garden within the London Borough of Camden
- New Covent Garden Market, located in Nine Elms, London, which replaced the old market in Covent Garden in 1974
- Royal Opera House, originally the Theatre Royal, Covent Garden

== See also ==
- Covent Garden (Brussels), office building in the Northern Quarter (Brussels)
- Covent Garden Festival
