= Richard Adams (disambiguation) =

Richard Adams (1920–2016) was an English novelist, author of Watership Down and The Plague Dogs.

Richard Adams may also refer to:

- Richard Adams (activist) (1947–2012), Filipino-American gay rights activist
- Richard Adams (architect) (1791–1835), Scottish painter and architect
- Richard Adams (British politician) (1912–1978), British politician
- Richard Adams (cricketer) (1838–1897), English cricketer
- Richard Adams (inventor) (born 1954), inventor of various electronic devices
- Richard Adams (poet) (1619–1661), collector of verse
- Richard Adams (religious writer) (c. 1626–1698), English minister and writer
- Richard Adams (businessman) (born 1946), British fair-trade organisation founder
- Richard Adams (Ohio politician) (born 1939), member of the Ohio House of Representatives
- Richard Adams (violinist) (born 1957), New Zealand jazz violinist and artist
- Richard Adams (Virginia politician) (1726-1800), Virginia merchant and politician (in both houses of Virginia General Assembly) and mayor or Richmond
- Richard C. Adams (1864–1921), Lenape poet and writer
- Richard D. Adams (1909–1987), United States Navy admiral
- Richard Life Adams (1840–1883), British architect; see Adams & Kelly
- Richard Newbold Adams (1924–2018), American anthropologist

== See also ==
- Dick Adams (disambiguation)
- Rick Adams (disambiguation)
- Richard Adam (born 1957), English businessman
