= George Smith (cricketer, born 1844) =

English cricketer and carpenter

Personal information
- Full name: George Smith
- Born: 17 December 1844; Cambridge, Cambridgeshire, England
- Died: 22 September 1876 (aged 31); Cambridge, Cambridgeshire, England
- Height: 5 ft 9 in (1.75 m)
- Batting: Right-handed
- Bowling: Right-arm roundarm fast
- Relatives: John Smith (brother)

Domestic team information
- Years: Team
- 1868–1871: Cambridgeshire

Career statistics
Competition	First-class
Matches	4
Runs scored	23
Batting average	3.28
100s/50s	–/–
Top score	7
Balls bowled	1,096
Wickets	23
Bowling average	16.69
5 wickets in innings	1
10 wickets in match	–
Best bowling	6/32
Catches/stumpings	2/–
- Source: Cricinfo, 10 April 2022

George Smith (17 December 1844 — 22 September 1876) was an English first-class cricketer and umpire.

Smith was born at Cambridge in December 1844. He was engaged as a right-arm roundarm fast bowler at Fenner's from 1867, with Smith making his debut in first-class cricket for Cambridgeshire against Kent at Fenner's the following year, with Smith also featuring in the return fixture at Gravesend. It was in the return fixture that he took his career-best bowling figures of 6 for 32. He made two further first-class appearances for Cambridgeshire, against Yorkshire at Hunslet in 1869 and Surrey at The Oval in 1871. He was described by Fred Lillywhite as "an average field and bat" and "a good and fast round-armed bowler". As a bowler he claimed 23 wickets in first-class cricket, at an average of 16.69; he was an economical bowler, with 112 maiden overs from 274 bowled. Aside from his connection with Cambridgeshire cricket, Smith was also engaged as a cricketer at Althorp by Earl Spencer in summer 1868, and at Cassiobury Park in 1870 and 1871. In addition to his career as a player, Smith also stood as an umpire in six first-class matches between 1868 and 1872. He was forced to give up cricket through illness in 1873. Away from cricket, Smith worked as a carpenter. His health continued to deteriorate, leading to his death at Cambridge in September 1876 from a complication of disorders. His brother, John, was also a first-class cricketer.
