= Edmund Bilton =

English cricketer

Personal information
- Full name: Edmund John Bilton
- Born: 23 May 1839; Cambridge, Cambridgeshire, England
- Died: 24 August 1916 (aged 77); Cambridge, Cambridgeshire, England
- Batting: Unknown
- Role: Wicket-keeper

Domestic team information
- Years: Team
- 1866: Cambridgeshire

Career statistics
| Competition | First-class |
|---|---|
| Matches | 3 |
| Runs scored | 25 |
| Batting average | 5.00 |
| 100s/50s | –/– |
| Top score | 11 |
| Catches/stumpings | 3/– |
- Source: Cricinfo, 19 February 2022

Edmund John Bilton (23 May 1839 — 24 August 1916) was an English first-class cricketer.

The son of James and Rebecca Bilton (née Ship), he was born at Cambridge in May 1839. A keen cricketer, he made three appearances in first-class cricket between 1859 and 1866 as a wicket-keeper for Cambridge Town Club (playing as Cambridgeshire in 1866), with all three of his first-class matches coming against Cambridge University. He scored 25 runs in his three matches, with a highest score of 11. Outside of cricket, Bilton was by profession a clerk and music teacher; his musical interest included his membership of both the King's College and Trinity College choirs at the University of Cambridge. Bilton died at Cambridge in August 1916.
