= Dick Adams =

Dick Adams may refer to:

- Dick Adams (Australian politician) (born 1951), Australian politician
- Dick Adams (baseball) (1920–2016), American Major League Baseball player
- Dick Adams (Canadian football) (born 1948), Canadian football player
- Dick Adams (Kentucky politician) (1943–2006), member of the Kentucky Senate

== See also ==
- Rick Adams (disambiguation)
- Richard Adams (disambiguation)
- Dick (disambiguation)
- Adams (disambiguation)
