= Rick Adams =

Rick Adams may refer to:

- Rick Adams (baseball) (1878–1955), American baseball player
- Rick Adams (Internet pioneer), American founder of UUNET
- Rick Adams (television presenter) (born 1971), English television presenter and online radio DJ

== See also ==
- Ricky Adams (1959–2011), Major League Baseball player
- Ricky G. Adams, American police officer and soldier
- Richard Adams (disambiguation)
- Dick Adams (disambiguation)
- Adams (surname)
