= Charles Thackeray =

English cricketer, soldier and businessman

Personal information
- Full name: Charles Thackeray
- Born: 17 November 1831; Cambridge, Cambridgeshire, England
- Died: 11 January 1902 (aged 70); Chappel, Essex, England
- Batting: Unknown
- Relatives: Frederick Thackeray (half-brother)

Domestic team information
- Years: Team
- 1854: Cambridge Town Club

Career statistics
Competition	First-class
Matches	1
Runs scored	43
Batting average	–
100s/50s	–/–
Top score	43*
Catches/stumpings	–/–
- Source: Cricinfo, 20 February 2022

Charles Thackeray JP (17 November 1831 — 11 January 1902) was an English first-class cricketer and British Army officer.

The son of Frederick Thackeray, physician at Addenbrookes Hospital, he was born at Cambridge in November 1831. He was educated at Eton College, where he captained the college cricket team in 1851. From there he matriculated to Emmanuel College, Cambridge. While studying at Cambridge, Thackeray made a single appearance in first-class cricket for the Cambridge Town Club against Cambridge University at Fenner's in 1854. Following his graduation from Cambridge, Thackeray pursued a career in the British Army. He was commissioned as an ensign in the 28th Foot in May 1855, with promotion by purchase to lieutenant following in March 1858. His next promotion came nearly a decade later in November 1867, when he purchased the rank of captain. He was promoted to major in September 1880 and retired the following year, at which point he was granted the honorary rank of lieutenant colonel. In addition to his military career, Thackeray was also appointed a justice of the peace for Essex. He died following a long illness at his residence in the Essex village of Chappel in January 1902. His half-brother Frederick Thackeray was also a first-class cricketer. His cousin was the novelist William Makepeace Thackeray.
