= Charles Marshall (cricketer, born 1842) =

English cricketer

Charles James Marshall (17 October 1842 – 11 February 1925) was an English first-class cricketer active 1868 who played for Cambridge Town Club (a.k.a. Cambridgeshire). He was born in Cambridge; died in San Francisco.

He was educated at Repton School and later became a Church of England clergyman and school master. He was ordained deacon in 1869 and priest in 1872 by the Bishop of Rochester; was assistant master at Haileybury College (1862–69), curate at Bengeo, Hertfordshire (1869–70); headmaster of Bengeo School (1869–91), then rector of Shillingstone, Dorset (1891–98).

He also played county cricket below first-class level for Shropshire in one match in 1866, and for Worcestershire and Warwickshire.
