= Octavius Eaden =

English cricketer

Octavius Eaden (15 December 1808, at Cambridge – 1832, at Cambridge) was an English cricketer who was associated with Cambridge Town Club and made his debut in 1827.

== Bibliography ==
- Haygarth, Arthur (1862). Scores & Biographies, Volume 2 (1827–1840). Lillywhite.
