= John Marshall (cricketer, born 1837) =

English clergyman and cricketer

John Hannath Marshall (1 October 1837 – 2 February 1879) was an English clergyman and a cricketer who played first-class cricket for Cambridge Town Club and Cambridge University. He was born in Cambridge and died at Kaiteriteri, Tasman Region, New Zealand.

Marshall was educated at King Edward's School, Birmingham, and at Trinity College, Cambridge. His first first-class cricket match as a tail-end right-handed batsman for Cambridge Town Club in 1857 also featured his elder brother, Joseph, who played for Cambridge University between 1855 and 1857, winning three Blues for cricket. John Marshall then won a Blue himself as a middle-order batsman for Cambridge University in 1859, appearing in the University Match against Oxford and top-scoring with an unbeaten 38 in the first innings: he scored just 7 in the second innings in a low-scoring game that Cambridge won by 28 runs. Marshall did not play in first-class cricket for Cambridge University after 1859; most of the rest of his cricket was for Cambridgeshire, then considered one of the major cricketing county sides, and his highest score was an unbeaten 47 in the home match against Surrey in 1861. He later played in minor matches for Suffolk.

== Personal life ==
Marshall graduated from Cambridge University in 1860 and, after a short spell as a schoolmaster at King Edward VI School, Bury St Edmunds, he was ordained as a Church of England clergyman in 1864. The year before he married Emily Louisa Merielina Rogers, the daughter of a clergyman in Bury St Edmunds, they went on to have four sons and a daughter including Patrick Marshall, a geologist, and Joy Marshall, a clergyman and sportsman.

Marshall was appointed as curate at Great Barton, Suffolk to 1868, then priest in charge at Horseheath, Cambridgeshire for a year; he was vicar of Sapiston, Suffolk from 1869 to 1871. He retired first to Devon and Cornwall then to New Zealand because of tuberculosis and died in Motueka, New Zealand, aged 41.
