= Arthur Tharp =

English cricketer, soldier and businessman

Personal information
- Full name: Arthur Keane Tharp
- Born: 15 September 1848; Chippenham, Cambridgeshire, England
- Died: 17 November 1928 (aged 80); Midanbury, Hampshire, England
- Height: 6 ft 1 in (1.85 m)
- Batting: Right-handed
- Bowling: Right-arm roundarm medium

Domestic team information
- Years: Team
- 1868–1871: Cambridgeshire

Career statistics
Competition	First-class
Matches	3
Runs scored	37
Batting average	6.16
100s/50s	0/0
Top score	16
Catches/stumpings	3/–
- Source: Cricinfo, 20 February 2022

Arthur Keane Tharp (15 September 1848 — 17 November 1928) was an English first-class cricketer, British Army officer and businessman.

The son of The Reverend Augustus James Tharp, he was born at the family estate of Chippenham Park in Cambridgeshire in September 1848. He was educated at Haileybury, where he was a noted sportsman; he won the Eton Fives competition in both singles and doubles for four years running, in addition to being the first winner of the Haileybury rackets competition. Tharp also played for the Haileybury cricket eleven, which he captained in 1866. From Haileybury he matriculated to Caius College, Cambridge. While studying at Cambridge, Tharp made three appearances in first-class cricket for the Cambridge Town Club (playing as Cambridgeshire), playing twice in 1868 against Cambridge University and Kent, and once in 1871 against Surrey. He scored 37 runs in these matches, with a highest score of 16. In addition to playing first-class period during this period, Tharp also played minor matches for Suffolk and later Norfolk.

Tharp was later commissioned as a second lieutenant in the Derbyshire Yeomanry in August 1895, with promotion to lieutenant following in April 1897. In August 1900, he was promoted to captain, before resigning his commission in February 1901. Around this period he was the secretary to the Naval and Military Club, before going into business. He was deputy chairman of the National Mutual Life Assurance Society and chairman of Messrs Bullers Ltd.. Tharp's interests also included sailing, for which he was a member of the Royal Yacht Squadron. Tharp married Madeleine Jane Jodrell, the youngest daughter of a reverend, in September 1879. He died at Midanbury in Southampton in November 1928.
