= Keith Booth (scorer) =

English cricket writer (1942–2024)

Keith Rodney Booth (30 September 1942 – 25 January 2024) was an English cricket writer and scorer.

Booth was the principal scorer for Surrey County Cricket Club and international matches played at The Oval between 1995 and 2017.

Like Geoffrey Boycott, Dickie Bird and Michael Parkinson, he was born in Barnsley, Yorkshire, and like them he inherited a love of cricket. He previously scored for Middlesex and MCC and was scorer for Test Match Special in the West Indies in 1994 and for Pakistan in the 1999 Cricket World Cup. His wife Jennifer (who died in November 2020), was Surrey's Second Eleven scorer.

Booth wrote a history of cricket scoring, biographies of the cricketers Michael Atherton, Ted Pooley, George Lohmann, Ernie Hayes, Walter Read, Tom Richardson and Jack Crawford, as well as a biography of the pioneering cricket and football administrator C. W. Alcock. He also wrote a four-person, three-generation biography of the Hayward family, comprising Daniel Hayward, his two sons Daniel and Thomas, and grandson Tom Hayward. His book about Lohmann won The Cricket Society's Book of the Year award for 2007.

Until 2017, he played for Sutton Cricket Club. He died in January 2024, at the age of 81.

== Publications ==
- Atherton's progress: From Kensington Oval to Kennington Oval (1996)
- Knowing the Score: the Past, Present and Future of Cricket Scoring (1999)
- His Own Enemy: The Rise and Fall of Edward Pooley (2000)
- The Father of Modern Sport: The Life and Times of Charles W. Alcock (2002, republished 2015)
- George Lohmann: Pioneer Professional (2007)
- Ernest Hayes: Brass in the Golden Age (2008)
- Walter Read: A Class Act (2011)
- Tom Richardson: A Bowler Pure and Simple (2012)
- Rebel With A Cause: The Life and Times of Jack Crawford (2016) co-authored with Jennifer Booth
- The Haywards: The Biography of a Cricket Dynasty (2018) co-authored with Jennifer Booth

=== Ghostwriting ===
- Lahore to London (2016) co-authored with Younis Ahmed
