= Henry Mason (cricketer) =

English cricketer and police officer

Personal information
- Full name: Henry Mason
- Born: 14 May 1840; Waterbeach, Cambridgeshire, England
- Died: 14 October 1902 (aged 62); Cambridge, Cambridgeshire, England
- Batting: Unknown
- Bowling: Unknown

Domestic team information
- Years: Team
- 1869–1871: Cambridgeshire

Career statistics
Competition	First-class
Matches	2
Runs scored	19
Batting average	4.75
100s/50s	–/–
Top score	12
Balls bowled	131
Wickets	5
Bowling average	12.00
5 wickets in innings	–
10 wickets in match	–
Best bowling	3/48
Catches/stumpings	–/–
- Source: Cricinfo, 28 March 2022

Henry Mason (14 May 1840 — 14 October 1902) was an English first-class cricketer and police officer.

== Biography ==
The son of John Mason, a schoolteacher, he was born in Cambridgeshire at Waterbeach in May 1840.

Mason was a prominent figure in Cambridgeshire cricket and made two appearances for the county in first-class cricket, against Yorkshire at Hunslet in 1869, and Surrey at The Oval in 1871. He scored 19 runs in these matches, in addition to taking five wickets.

Mason was employed for over 30 years at Christ's College, Cambridge as a policeman in the Cambridge University Constabulary, colloquially known as 'bulldogs'. Mason died from pneumonia on 14 October 1902, which was determined by an inquest to have been caused by two factors. The first of these was attributed to Mason falling from a ladder while gathering plums in the college garden, which had caused a broken rib. The second was a subsequent fall in his bedroom, aggravating the injury and causing pneumonia.
