= Thomas Stearn =

English cricketer

Thomas Stearn (20 November 1796, at Cambridge – 21 March 1862, at Cambridge) was an English professional cricketer who played from 1825 to 1840. He was mainly associated with Cambridge Town Club and made 22 known appearances in important matches.

== Bibliography ==
- Arthur Haygarth, Scores & Biographies, Volume 1-2 (1744–1840), Lillywhite, 1862
