= George Sussum =

English cricketer

George Sussum (c. 1803 – 10 August 1882) was an English cricketer who was associated with Cambridge Town Club and made his debut in 1827, playing at that level until 1832. He was born and died in Cambridge. Sussum made nine appearances, sometimes as a wicketkeeper, scoring 163 runs with a highest score of 44. He held one catch and completed four stumpings. His bowling style is not recorded but he took 47 wickets with a best performance of six in one innings.

== Bibliography ==
- Haygarth, Arthur (1996) [1862]. Scores & Biographies, Volume 1 (1744–1826). Kennington: Frederick Lillywhite. ISBN 978-19-00592-23-9.
- Haygarth, Arthur (1997) [1862]. Scores & Biographies, Volume 2 (1827–1840). Kennington: Frederick Lillywhite. ISBN 978-19-00592-23-9.
