= William Mills (English cricketer) =

English lawyer and cricketer

William Mills (3 June 1820 – 22 September 1877) was an English lawyer and cricketer who played in first-class cricket matches for Cambridge University, Cambridge Town Club, Marylebone Cricket Club and the Gentlemen of England. He was born in Westminster and died at St John's Wood, both in London.

Mills was educated at Harrow School and at St John's College, Cambridge. Mills captained Harrow at cricket in 1839, but with him batting in the middle order and apparently not bowling, the Eton v Harrow match was lost badly. At Cambridge University, his batting was less crucial and he often batted lower in the innings, but he made a particular impression as a bowler: because the lack of full scorecards during Mills' career, most of his precise match figures are not known and it is not known whether he batted or bowled right-handed or left-handed, nor whether he was fast or slow. He took five wickets in an innings against Cambridge Town Club in 1842, and four wickets in an innings in other matches. He played in the University Match against Oxford University in the four seasons from 1840 to 1843, and played for MCC in occasional games from 1842 to 1844.

After graduating from Cambridge University in 1843 with a Bachelor of Arts degree, Mills became a barrister studying at the Inner Temple and was called to the bar in 1847. He practised on the South Wales and Chester Circuit and then worked for the Law Reports and authored legal books.
