= Haggis (disambiguation) =

Haggis is a Scottish dish.

Haggis or variations may also refer to:

== Arts and entertainment ==
- Haggis (card game), shedding card game
- "Haggis" (Servant), a 2019 television episode
- Haggis MacHaggis, fictional character from The Ren & Stimpy Show

== Science and technology ==
- Haggis (programming language), for computing science in Scotland
- Haggis (pygmy hippo), a pygmy hippopotamus at Edinburgh Zoo, Scotland

== People ==
- Israel Haggis (1811–1849), English cricketer
- Paul Haggis (born 1953), Canadian film director

== See also ==
- Wild haggis, a fictional creature in Scottish folklore
