= Edward Cowell =

English cricketer

Personal information
- Full name: Edward Cowell
- Born: 22 March 1848; Cambridge, Cambridgeshire, England
- Died: 17 November 1885 (aged 37); Cambridge, Cambridgeshire, England
- Height: 5 ft 11 in (1.80 m)
- Batting: Right-handed
- Bowling: Right-arm roundarm fast

Domestic team information
- Years: Team
- 1867: Cambridgeshire

Career statistics
Competition	First-class
Matches	3
Runs scored	37
Batting average	7.40
100s/50s	–/–
Top score	13
Balls bowled	153
Wickets	4
Bowling average	15.25
5 wickets in innings	–
10 wickets in match	–
Best bowling	3/11
Catches/stumpings	1/–
- Source: Cricinfo, 10 March 2022

Edward Cowell (22 March 1848 – 17 November 1885) was an English first-class cricketer.

Cowell was born at Cambridge in March 1848. He played first-class cricket for Cambridgeshire in 1867, making two appearances against Nottinghamshire and one appearance against Yorkshire. A right-arm roundarm fast bowler, he took 4 wickets with best figures of 3 for 11. As a batsman, he scored 37 runs with a highest score of 13. It was noted by Fred Lillywhite that Cowell was a strong fielder at mid-on. In the same year that he played for Cambridgeshire, he was engaged by Trinity College at their cricket ground in Cambridge and was later engaged by Warwickshire in 1874 at their County Ground in Warwick. Cowell died at Cambridge in November 1885.
