= William Austin (cricketer) =

English cricketer

Personal information
- Full name: William Austin
- Born: 1801; Cambridge
- Died: Unknown

Career statistics
Competition	First-class
Matches	2
Runs scored	59
Batting average	14.75
100s/50s	0/0
Top score	35
Catches/stumpings	3/–
- Source: ESPNcricinfo, 22 June 2013

William Austin (born 1801) was an English first-class cricketer active in 1827 and 1828. He was born in Cambridge.

Austin made two first-class appearances for the Cambridge Union Club, with both appearances coming against Cambridge University in 1827 and 1828 at the University Ground, Barnwell. Austin scored a total of 59 runs in his two matches, top scoring with 35.
