= George Muncey =

English cricketer

Personal information
- Born: 27 December 1835; Mildenhall, Suffolk, England
- Died: 14 March 1883 (aged 47); Cambridge, Cambridgeshire, England
- Batting: Right-handed
- Bowling: Right-arm slow

Domestic team information
- Years: Team
- 1861–1866: Cambridgeshire

Career statistics
Competition	First-class
Matches	10
Runs scored	197
Batting average	10.36
100s/50s	0/0
Top score	37
Balls bowled	256
Wickets	10
Bowling average	19.22
5 wickets in innings	0
10 wickets in match	0
Best bowling	4/25
Catches/stumpings	1/–
- Source: Cricinfo, 9 April 2022

George Muncey (27 December 1835 — 14 March 1883) was an English first-class cricketer.

Muncey was born in December 1835 at Mildenhall, Suffolk. He played first-class cricket for the Cambridge Town Club (also known as Cambridgeshire), making his debut against Cambridge University at Fenner's in 1860. He played for Cambridgeshire representative sides until 1866, making ten first-class appearances.

An all-rounder, Muncey scored 197 runs at an average of 10.36, with a highest score of 37; as a right-arm underarm slow bowler, he took 10 wickets at a bowling average of 19.22, and best figures of 4 for 25.

Away from cricket, Muncey found himself in trouble with the law on several occasions. He was summoned by the Board of Guardians of the Cambridge Poor Law Union in April 1868 for neglecting his three children. In the same month he was charged with assaulting a Thomas Lee. In January 1869, while on bail for another offence, he was charged with stealing three gallons of brandy and two bottles. In July of the same year, he was charged with assaulting fellow cricketer Frederick Bell following a disagreement over goods received; Muncey admitted the offence and paid a fine. Muncey died at Cambridge in March 1883.
