= Horace Browne =

English cricketer and barrister

Personal information
- Full name: Horace James Browne
- Born: 1 December 1842; Cambridge, Cambridgeshire, England
- Died: 19 March 1896 (aged 53); Byfleet, Surrey, England
- Batting: Unknown

Domestic team information
- Years: Team
- 1865–1869: Cambridgeshire

Career statistics
| Competition | First-class |
|---|---|
| Matches | 7 |
| Runs scored | 111 |
| Batting average | 10.09 |
| 100s/50s | –/– |
| Top score | 28 |
| Catches/stumpings | –/– |
- Source: Cricinfo, 7 February 2022

Horace James Browne (1 December 1842 — 19 March 1896) was an English first-class cricketer and barrister.

The son of Moses Browne, he was born at Cambridge in December 1842. He was educated at King Edward VI Grammar School, before matriculating to Clare College, Cambridge. A student of the Lincoln's Inn, he was called to the bar to practice as a barrister in June 1870 and practiced on the South Eastern circuit. Browne was a keen cricketer, playing at first-class level for Cambridgeshire on seven occasions between 1865 and 1869. Playing as a batsman in the Cambridgeshire side, he scored 111 runs at an average of 10.09, with a highest score of 28. Browne was later admitted into the Middle Temple in 1885. He was found dead on 19 March 1896 at Dartnal Woods in Byfleet, having committed suicide by poisoning while ajudged to have been suffering from melancholia which had contributed toward temporary insanity.
