= Frederick Bell (cricketer) =

English cricketer & umpire (1830–1871)

Personal information
- Full name: Frederick William Bell
- Born: 2 January 1830; St Neots, Huntingdonshire, England
- Died: 18 September 1871 (aged 41); Cambridge, Cambridgeshire, England
- Batting: Right-handed
- Bowling: Roundarm-medium

Domestic team information
- Years: Team
- 1847–1855: Cambridge Town Club
- 1857–1864: Cambridgeshire
- 1858: MCC

Career statistics
Competition	First-class
Matches	58
Runs scored	921
Batting average	11.23
100s/50s	0/1
Top score	50*
Balls bowled	2,618
Wickets	79
Bowling average	16.20
5 wickets in innings	4
10 wickets in match	1
Best bowling	6/25
Catches/stumpings	23/–
- Source: Cricinfo, 11 September 2019

Frederick William Bell (2 January 1830 – 18 September 1871) was an English first-class cricketer and umpire.

Bell was born at St Neots in Huntingdonshire in January 1830. He made his debut in first-class cricket for Cambridge Town and County Club against Cambridge University in 1846 at Parker's Piece. Bell played first-class cricket for teams representative of Cambridgeshire until 1864, making 24 appearances. He also played ten first-class matches for a United England Eleven between 1854 and 1864 and the same number of matches for the North between 1855 and 1859. He also represented an England XI on six occasions, the Marylebone Cricket Club three times, the Players in the Gentlemen v Players fixture twice and once for an All England Eleven.

Playing as a roundarm medium pace bowler, Bell took a total of 79 wickets in his 58 matches at an average of 16.20. He took five wickets in an innings on four occasions and took ten wickets in a match once. His best innings figures of 6 for 25 came for Cambridgeshire against Surrey at The Oval in 1857. As a batsman, he scored a total of 921 runs at a batting average of 11.23 and a high score of 50 not out.

A professional cricketer, he played for a number of clubs at non first-class level and stood as an umpire in ten first-class matches between 1860–68. He coached cricket at Eton College, in addition to coaching the sons of Queen Victoria. He was the victim of an assault by fellow cricketer George Muncey in July 1869, following a disagreement over goods received; Muncey admitted the offence and paid a fine. Bell died at Cambridge in September 1871.
