= Henry Foster (cricketer, born 1809) =

English cricketer and brewer

Personal information
- Full name: Henry Staples Foster
- Born: 1809; Cambridge, Cambridgeshire, England
- Died: 4 February 1868 (aged 58/59); Great Yarmouth, Norfolk, England
- Batting: Unknown

Domestic team information
- Years: Team
- 1849–1850: Marylebone Cricket Club

Career statistics
Competition	First-class
Matches	7
Runs scored	54
Batting average	4.50
100s/50s	–/–
Top score	17
Catches/stumpings	–/–
- Source: Cricinfo, 26 August 2021

Henry Staples Foster (1809 – 4 February 1868) was an English first-class cricketer and brewer who later served as Mayor of Cambridge.

== Biography ==
The son of the Richard Foster and Sophia Staples, he was born at Cambridge in 1809. A prominent Cambridge cricketer, Foster played first-class cricket for Cambridge Town Club from 1844 to 1848, making five appearances. Cambridge Town Club played under various names, with Foster making four appearances for it as Cambridge Town and County Club and one appearance for it as Cambridge Townsmen. For Cambridge Town Club, Foster scored 48 runs with a highest score of 17. He also later made two first-class appearances for the Marylebone Cricket Club against Cambridge University in 1849 and 1850. He was by profession a brewer and a wine and spirits merchant. Foster was one of the opponents of Income Tax in Cambridge, chairing a meeting to its opposition in February 1843. He was elected mayor of Cambridge in 1849. Foster died at Great Yarmouth in February 1868.
