= Frederick Thackeray =

English cricketer and clergyman

Personal information
- Full name: Frederick Thackeray
- Born: 23 March 1817; Cambridge, Cambridgeshire, England
- Died: 28 July 1892 (aged 75); Chappel, Essex, England
- Batting: Unknown
- Bowling: Right-arm roundarm fast
- Relatives: Charles Thackeray (half-brother)

Domestic team information
- Years: Team
- 1837–1843: Cambridge University
- 1839–1842: Marylebone Cricket Club
- 1841–1854: Cambridge Town Club

Career statistics
| Competition | First-class |
|---|---|
| Matches | 38 |
| Runs scored | 567 |
| Batting average | 10.12 |
| 100s/50s | –/2 |
| Top score | 73 |
| Balls bowled | 338 |
| Wickets | 27 |
| Bowling average | 16.20 |
| 5 wickets in innings | 1 |
| 10 wickets in match | – |
| Best bowling | 5/57 |
| Catches/stumpings | 10/– |
- Source: Cricinfo, 28 March 2019

Frederick Thackeray (23 February 1817 – 28 July 1892) was an English clergyman and cricketer who played first-class cricket for Cambridge University, the Marylebone Cricket Club (MCC) and many other amateur teams between 1837 and 1854. He was born at Cambridge and died at Chappel, Essex.

The son of Frederick Thackeray, physician at Addenbrookes Hospital in Cambridge, Thackeray was the first cousin of novelist William Makepeace Thackeray. He was educated at Eton College and Gonville and Caius College, Cambridge.

As a cricketer, he was usually a lower-order batsman and a right-arm fast bowler in the round-arm style; it is not known whether he batted right- or left-handed, and occasionally he batted in the upper order. Scorecards for matches of his time are often incomplete and his precise career bowling figures are also unknown; in addition, his bowling style may be suspect, as, in 1841, there were two matches billed as between the "Fast Bowlers" and the "Slow Bowlers", and Thackeray played in both, once for each side.

Thackeray had a long career for Cambridge by university standards, playing regularly for the university side from 1837 to 1840 and then intermittently through to 1843. He appeared three times in the University Match against Oxford University in 1838, 1839 and 1840, though he made no impact as a bowler in any of these matches. From 1839, he played after the university term was over for MCC and several other teams, including the Cambridge Town Club, and he had more success as a batsman in some of these matches: his highest first-class score was an innings of 73 made for the MCC against the North at Burton upon Trent in 1840. In 1841 and 1842, he played for the England cricket team in matches against Kent and Sussex that featured many of the leading cricketers of the day. And in 1845 his best bowling – five wickets for 57 runs – came in his solitary game for the Manchester Cricket Club, a match against a Sheffield Cricket Club side that was labelled as "Yorkshire". He played only one further first-class match after 1845: a game for the Cambridge Town Club against Cambridge University in which he scored 51, his second first-class half-century, and in which his half-brother, Charles, made his only first-class cricket appearance.

The unusual length of Thackeray's cricket career (for a Cambridge University cricketer) may have been to do with an apparent change in direction. Thackeray graduated as a Bachelor of Arts in 1840, and the following year as a Bachelor of Medicine, having been in receipt of one of the Tancred scholarships endowed at Gonville and Caius for aspiring medical doctors. He did not practise as a doctor, however, and in 1844 he was ordained as a Church of England deacon, becoming a priest in 1845. He was a curate at St Thomas' church in Stockport from 1844 to 1846 (which explains his appearance for Manchester Cricket Club in 1845) and then from 1847 to his death in 1892 he was vicar of Shopland in Essex and curate at nearby Great Wakering.
