= Henry Page (cricketer) =

English cricketer

Henry Page (born 16 November 1788 at Cambridge; date of death unknown) was an English professional cricketer who played from 1819 to 1826. He was mainly associated with Cambridge Town Club and made 7 known appearances in important matches.

== Bibliography ==
- Arthur Haygarth, Scores & Biographies, Volume 1 (1744–1826), Lillywhite, 1862
