= Mark Arnold (cricketer) =

English cricketer (1827–1901)

Personal information
- Full name: Mark Arnold
- Born: 25 September 1827; Cambridge, Cambridgeshire, England
- Died: Q4 1901 (aged 73); Hackney, London, England
- Batting: Unknown
- Bowling: Unknown
- Relatives: Charles Arnold (brother)

Career statistics
Competition	First-class
Matches	4
Runs scored	7
Batting average	1.40
100s/50s	–/–
Top score	3*
Balls bowled	?
Wickets	11
Bowling average	?
5 wickets in innings	1
10 wickets in match	–
Best bowling	6/?
Catches/stumpings	1/–
- Source: Cricinfo, 6 February 2022

Mark Arnold (25 September 1827 — Q4 1901) was an English first-class cricketer.

The son of James Arnold, a coach builder, he was born at Cambridge in September 1827. His elder brother was Charles, who was a professional cricketer. Arnold appeared in four first-class cricket matches for the Cambridge Town Club from 1848 to 1855. Playing as a bowler, he took 11 wickets and took a five wicket haul on one occasion. Like his brother, he too was engaged as a professional, by teams as far north as Yorkshire and as far south as Dorset. Arnold died at Hackney in the first-quarter of 1901.
