= David Edwards (Cambridgeshire cricketer) =

English cricketer

Personal information
- Full name: David Bush Edwards
- Born: 18 August 1805; Cambridge
- Died: 24 September 1850 (aged 45); Cambridge

Domestic team information
- Years: Team
- 1826–1843: Cambridge Town Club
- Source: CricketArchive, 18 June 2013

David Bush Edwards (18 August 1805 – 24 September 1850) was an English cricketer. He played for the Cambridge Town Club and was recorded in 26 important matches from 1826 to 1843, totalling 366 runs with a highest score of 34. He took 82 wickets with a best return of six in one innings. As an occasional wicketkeeper, he held 8 catches and completed 3 stumpings.

== Bibliography ==
- Haygarth, Arthur (1862). Scores & Biographies, Volume 1 (1744–1826). Lillywhite.
- Haygarth, Arthur (1862). Scores & Biographies, Volume 2 (1827–1840). Lillywhite.
