= William Emmerson =

English cricketer

William Henry Emmerson (born 1801, Cambridge; died 31 July 1868, Cambridge) was an English cricketer who was associated with Cambridge Union Club and made his debut in 1829.

== Bibliography ==
- Haygarth, Arthur (1862). Scores & Biographies, Volume 2 (1827–1840). Lillywhite.
