= John Smith (cricketer, born 1843) =

English cricketer

Personal information
- Full name: John Smith
- Born: 20 November 1843; Cambridge, Cambridgeshire, England
- Died: 15 April 1873 (aged 29); Stratford-by-Bow, Essex, England
- Batting: Right-handed
- Role: Bbatsman

Domestic team information
- Years: Team
- 1863–1872: Cambridge Town Club
- Source: CricketArchive, 30 June 2013

John Smith (born 20 November 1843 – 15 April 1873) was an English cricketer with professional status. He was associated with Cambridge Town Club and represented both the North in North v South fixtures and the Players in Gentlemen v Players fixtures. Smith was a right-handed batsman who is recorded in 75 matches from 1863 to 1872, totalling 2,274 runs with a highest score of 97, one of six half-centuries, and holding 33 catches. His brother, George, was also a cricketer.
