= Charles Marshall (Middlesex cricketer) =

English cricketer (1843–1904)

Charles Marshall (20 February 1843 – 25 February 1904) was an English first-class cricketer active 1866 who played for Middlesex and Cambridge Town Club (aka Cambridgeshire). He was born in Cricklewood and died in East Putney. He played in six first-class matches.
