= Joseph Marshall (cricketer, born 1835) =

English clergyman and cricketer

- Born: 5 December 1835
- Died: 10 September 1915 (aged 79)
- Education: King Edward's School, Birmingham; Trinity College, Cambridge
- Occupations: Clergyman, cricketer
- Children: Elsie Marshall

Joseph William Marshall (5 December 1835 – 10 September 1915) was an English clergyman and a cricketer who played first-class cricket for Cambridge University and Cambridge Town Club (aka Cambridgeshire). He was born in Cambridge and died at Kidbrooke, Blackheath, London.

Marshall was educated at King Edward's School, Birmingham and at Trinity College, Cambridge. He played cricket for Cambridge University in all three seasons from 1855 to 1857 and appeared in the University Match against Oxford University each year. Details of his cricket are in some places sketchy, and it is not known if he was right- or left-handed; he played as an opening or middle-order batsman and also bowled, though he appears to have been a change bowler rather than a front-line bowler. In the University Match of 1857, he scored 48 in the Cambridge first innings, the highest score of his university cricket career, and he took two Oxford wickets; but Oxford won the match comfortably. Earlier in the same season, his score of 78 for the Cambridge Town Club against the university team was the highest of his first-class career; in this match, his younger brother John made his first-class debut. He did not play any further first-class cricket after leaving Cambridge University, though he continued to appear in minor matches, including some for Staffordshire, through to the 1880s.

After leaving university, Marshall was ordained as a clergyman in the Church of England and served as curate at Martley, Worcestershire and in two churches in Birmingham. From 1864 to 1875 he was vicar of Birchfield, then part of Staffordshire. He then moved to St John the Evangelist's Church, Blackheath in south-east London as vicar and remained there until his retirement in 1909; from 1900 he was an honorary canon of Rochester Cathedral and from 1906 a canon also of Southwark Cathedral, retaining both of these posts to his death in 1915.

Marshall's daughter, Elsie Marshall, was one of the Christian missionaries killed in 1895 in the Kucheng Massacre in China; he edited her letters for publication.
