= Henry Saunders (cricketer, born 1841) =

English cricketer and businessman

Personal information
- Full name: Henry Banyard Saunders
- Born: 29 December 1841; Impington, Cambridgeshire, England
- Died: 18 March 1904 (aged 62); Liverpool, Lancashire, England
- Height: 5 ft 9 in (1.75 m)
- Batting: Unknown
- Bowling: Unknown
- Relatives: William Saunders (brother)

Domestic team information
- Years: Team
- 1865–1866: Cambridgeshire

Career statistics
Competition	First-class
Matches	9
Runs scored	151
Batting average	10.06
100s/50s	–/–
Top score	39
Balls bowled	44
Wickets	1
Bowling average	47.00
5 wickets in innings	–
10 wickets in match	–
Best bowling	1/47
Catches/stumpings	4/2
- Source: Cricinfo, 27 March 2022

Henry Banyard Saunders (29 December 1841 — 18 March 1904) was an English first-class cricketer and businessman.

The son of William Saunders senior, and his wife, Elizabeth, he was born in December 1841 at Impington, Cambridgeshire. He was educated at the Llandaff House school in Cambridge. A leading cricketer in Cambridgeshire in the mid-1860s, he played first-class cricket for Cambridgeshire on nine occasions in 1864 and 1865. Saunders was a versatile cricketer who could bat, bowl and keep wicket. He scored 151 runs in his nine first-class matches, at average of 10.06 and with a highest score of 39. As an occasional bowler and wicket-keeper, he took a single wicket and made two stumpings. He later resided at Liverpool, where he was the director of a mineral water company, which by August 1894 had been entered into bankruptcy. Saunders died at Liverpool in March 1904. His brother, William junior, was also a first-class cricketer.
