= Alfred Rowe =

English clergyman, educationalist, and cricketer

Alfred William Rowe (1 July 1837 – 12 March 1921) was an English clergyman and educationalist by career, and also a cricketer who played first-class cricket in two matches in the 1859 season. He was born in Cambridge and died at Mapperley, Nottingham.

Rowe was educated at Lancing College and at Uppingham School and then at Trinity College, Cambridge. As a cricketer, his batting and bowling styles are not known, but from his record in Cambridge University Cricket Club trial matches in 1858 and 1859, the university side appears to have regarded him primarily as a bowler. Nevertheless, it was a batsman, playing for the Cambridge Town Club against the university that he made impact in his first first-class game, scoring 45, the highest score of a rain-affected game: he also took wickets and made a catch. That led to his selection for the university team in the next game, a match against the Marylebone Cricket Club (MCC), in which he batted at No 8 and scored 1 and 16, taking a single wicket. Though there were other non-first-class matches over the next few weeks for Cambridge University, he did not play first-class cricket again.

Rowe graduated from Cambridge University with a Bachelor of Arts degree in 1859. He became a schoolmaster at Felsted School from 1861, being headmaster temporarily in 1875; while at Felsted, he was ordained as a Church of England priest. From 1888 to 1892 he was a full-time clergyman as vicar of New Brentford in west London, and he then became principal of the Lincoln Theological College until his retirement in 1912. He was a canon of Lincoln Cathedral from 1896 to his death in 1921.
