= William Chapman (Cambridgeshire cricketer) =

English cricketer and clergyman

Personal information
- Full name: William Herbert Chapman
- Born: 9 August 1834; Bassingbourn, Cambridgeshire, England
- Died: 23 June 1908 (aged 73); Brackley, Northamptonshire, England
- Batting: Unknown

Domestic team information
- Years: Team
- 1853: Cambridge Town Club

Career statistics
Competition	First-class
Matches	1
Runs scored	4
Batting average	4.00
100s/50s	–/–
Top score	3
Catches/stumpings	–/–
- Source: Cricinfo, 24 May 2022

William Herbert Chapman (9 August 1834 – 23 June 1908) was an English first-class cricketer and clergyman.

The son of The Reverend William Chapman senior, he was born in August 1834 at Bassingbourn, Cambridgeshire. He was educated at Charterhouse School, before matriculating to Emmanuel College, Cambridge. While studying at Cambridge he was active in the Cambridge Town Club (CTC), for whom he made a single appearance in first-class cricket for against Cambridge University at Fenner's in 1853. Batting twice in the match, he was dismissed opening the batting for 3 runs by Charles Pontifex in the CTC first innings, while in their second innings he was unbeaten having scored a single run.

After graduating from Cambridge in 1859, Chapman was ordained as a deacon and became a priest at Peterborough Cathedral the following year. He was curate at North Luffenham from 1859 to 1862 and was curate at Weldon in Northamptonshire from 1862 to 1875. From there he spent a year as curate at Nassington, before taking up his final ecclesiastical post as rector at Eydon in 1876, where he was assisted by his wife. He remained in post there until his death a Brackley in June 1908.
