= Henry Bird (cricketer) =

English cricketer

Henry Bird (22 May 1800 – 1864) was an English professional cricketer who played from 1819 to 1826 for Cambridge Town Club, making 6 known appearances in important matches.

== Bibliography ==
- Haygarth, Arthur (1996) [1862]. Scores & Biographies, Volume 1 (1744–1826). Kennington: Frederick Lillywhite. ISBN 978-19-00592-23-9.
- Haygarth, Arthur (1997) [1862]. Scores & Biographies, Volume 2 (1827–1840). Kennington: Frederick Lillywhite. ISBN 978-19-00592-23-9.
