= James Hall (Cambridgeshire cricketer) =

English cricketer

Domestic team information
- Years: Team
- 1821–1838: Cambridge Town Club
- Source: CricketArchive, 30 March 2013

James Hall (dates unknown) was an English cricketer who played for Cambridge Town Club in the 1820s and 1830s. He is recorded in 12 matches, totalling 151 runs with a highest score of 39 and holding 5 catches.

== Bibliography ==
- Haygarth, Arthur (1862). Scores & Biographies, Volume 1 (1744–1826). Lillywhite.
