= Thomas Nichols (cricketer, born 1848) =

English cricketer, clergyman and educator

Personal information
- Full name: Thomas Bartrup Nichols
- Born: 25 May 1848; Cambridge, Cambridgeshire, England
- Died: 7 March 1915 (aged 66); Kineton, Warwickshire, England
- Batting: Unknown

Domestic team information
- Years: Team
- 1868: Cambridgeshire

Career statistics
Competition	First-class
Matches	1
Runs scored	16
Batting average	16.00
100s/50s	–/–
Top score	15*
Catches/stumpings	–/–
- Source: Cricinfo, 26 May 2022

Thomas Bartrup Nichols (25 May 1848 — 7 March 1915) was an English first-class cricketer, Anglican clergyman and educator.

== Biography ==
The eldest son of Thomas Nichols senior, he was born in May 1848 at Cambridge. He later matriculated in October 1866 to Corpus Christi College, Cambridge. While studying at Cambridge he made a single appearance in first-class cricket for Cambridgeshire against Cambridge University at Fenner's in 1868. Batting twice in the match, he was dismissed in the Cambridgeshire first innings for a single run by Charlie Absolom, while following-on in their second innings, he ended the innings unbeaten on 15 to help Cambridgeshire secure a draw.

After graduating from Cambridge in 1874, Nichols opened St Oswald's College, a boarding school for boys, at Cullercoats in Northumberland, appointing himself headmaster. He volunteered in the 1st Northumberland Corps in June 1879, holding the rank of second lieutenant. He was ordained as a deacon at Durham Cathedral in 1880 and appointed a priest there the following year. Alongside his mastership at St Oswald's, Nichols was appointed curate at Tynemouth from 1880 to 1882, before becoming an evening lecturer at the Church of St Thomas the Martyr, a role he retained until 1894. In 1884, Nichols was appointed an acting chaplain in the 1st Northumberland and Sunderland Volunteer Corps. St Oswald's ceased to function in 1886, moving to Tynemouth where it became part of the Kings Priory School; he remained in his post as headmaster until 1895. Nichols moved to South Wales after, where he was curate at Neath until 1897.

His life suffered hardship at the turn of the 20th century, with his son dying in infancy, Nichols entering into poverty, and his conviction at a North London court for being drunk in the street. By 1910 he had resumed his ecclesiastical duties as a preacher in the Diocese of St Albans. Nichols died from pneumonia in March 1915 at Kineton, Warwickshire.
