= John Perkins (cricketer) =

English cricketer

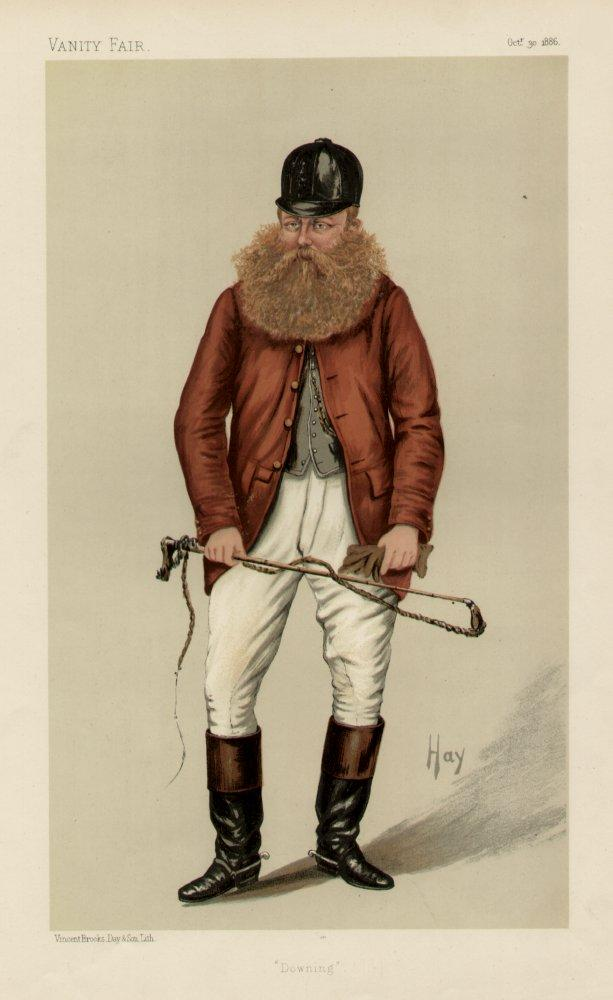
- "Downing", caricature by Hay in Vanity Fair, 1886.

Personal information
- Full name: John Perkins
- Born: 17 May 1837; Sawston, Cambridgeshire, England
- Died: 30 April 1901 (aged 63); East Hatley, Cambridgeshire, England
- Batting: Right-handed
- Bowling: Right-arm underarm slow
- Relatives: Henry Perkins (brother)

Domestic team information
- Years: Team
- 1861–1867: Cambridgeshire
- 1863–1868: Marylebone Cricket Club

Career statistics
Competition	First-class
Matches	15
Runs scored	440
Batting average	18.33
100s/50s	–/3
Top score	67
Catches/stumpings	5/–
- Source: Cricinfo, 26 April 2021

John Perkins (17 May 1837 – 30 April 1901) was an English first-class cricketer.

The son of The Reverend Henry Perkins, he was born in May 1837 at Sawston, Cambridgeshire. He was educated at King Edward VI School, Bury St Edmunds, before going up to Christ's College, Cambridge. He migrated to Downing College in 1861, where he was a classics fellow. In the same year he made his debut in first-class cricket for Cambridgeshire against Surrey at Fenner's. He played first-class cricket for Cambridgeshire until 1867, making eleven appearances. Perkins scored 311 runs in his eleven matches for Cambridgeshire, making two half centuries and recording a highest score of 67. He served as secretary to Cambridgeshire County Cricket Club in 1866. In addition to playing first-class cricket for Cambridgeshire, Perkins also made four appearances for the Marylebone Cricket Club between 1863 and 1868, scoring 129 runs and made a single half century score of 67. At Downing College he became a tutor and bursar. He was a well-known figure in Cambridgeshire sport, where he was known by the nickname Jack, and was the brother of the cricketer Henry Perkins. Perkins attempted to commit suicide by shooting himself at East Hatley on 30 April 1901, when described as "not being of sound mind"; he succumbed to his wounds a short time later.
