= Henry Perkins (cricketer) =

English lawyer, cricketer, and administrator

Personal information
- Full name: Henry Perkins
- Born: 10 December 1832; Sawston, Cambridgeshire, England
- Died: 6 May 1916 (aged 83); New Barnet, Hertfordshire, England
- Batting: Right-handed
- Bowling: Right-arm underarm slow
- Relatives: John Perkins (brother)

Domestic team information
- Years: Team
- 1854: Cambridge University
- 1857–1866: Cambridgeshire
- 1857–1868: Marylebone Cricket Club

Career statistics
Competition	First-class
Matches	28
Runs scored	370
Batting average	9.25
100s/50s	–/–
Top score	36
Balls bowled	946
Wickets	30
Bowling average	18.07
5 wickets in innings	2
10 wickets in match	–
Best bowling	5/48
Catches/stumpings	15/–
- Source: Cricinfo, 26 April 2021

Henry Perkins (10 December 1832 – 6 May 1916) was an English lawyer, cricketer and cricket administrator. He played first-class cricket for Cambridge University, Cambridge Town Club (aka Cambridgeshire), Marylebone Cricket Club (MCC) and various amateur sides between 1854 and 1868, and he was the secretary of the MCC from 1876 to 1898. He was born at Sawston, Cambridgeshire, and died at New Barnet, then in Hertfordshire.

The son of the curate of Sawston, Perkins was educated at Bury St Edmunds and at Trinity College, Cambridge. His father died when he was five years old, but at seven he inherited an estate at Thriplow, Cambridgeshire. He was at Cambridge University from the autumn of 1850, but appeared in important cricket only in his later years there, and his sole first-class match for the first team was the 1854 University Match against Oxford University; at the end of the first day in this game Cambridge, already facing a first-innings deficit of 68, had lost seven wickets for just 13 runs in their second innings, but on the second morning Perkins made 27 out of a final total of 60.

Leaving Cambridge with a Bachelor of Arts degree in 1854 – converted to a Master of Arts in 1857 – Perkins qualified as a barrister at the Inner Temple and was called to the bar in 1858, practising on the Norfolk Circuit. He played intermittent first-class cricket matches from 1856 to 1868, appearing most regularly for the Cambridgeshire county team, which was first-class in some games until the late 1860s, and where he also acted as honorary secretary. A lower-order, sometimes tail-end, right-handed batsman and a right-arm underarm lob bowler, his best bowling came in an 1862 Cambridgeshire match against Nottinghamshire, taking five second innings wickets (out of seven that fell) for just 48 runs. He had earlier taken five wickets for 83 runs for the "Gentlemen of the North" against the "Gentlemen of the South" in a match in 1859 and in this game he also scored 36 in the first innings, which was his highest first-class score.

Perkins became secretary of the MCC in 1876 and remained in the post for 22 years; he instituted the annual meeting of the county club secretaries at which the fixture list was agreed, with the counties that achieved a threshold number of home and away fixtures qualifying from 1890 for the County Championship. At his retirement in 1898, when he was succeeded by Francis Lacey, he was voted an annual pension of £400 a year and given life membership. MCC membership doubled from 2,000 to 4,000 during his tenure, and he was also responsible for a written history of the club at its centenary in 1887. He was also an author in his legal career, acting as editor of Dixon's Law of the Farm.

In 1855, Perkins married Blanche, daughter of Charles Fiddey; three of their sons also attended Cambridge University. His brother, John, was also a first-class cricketer.
