= William Batchelor (cricketer) =

English cricketer, educator, clergyman

Personal information
- Full name: William Jesse Batchelor
- Born: 14 November 1846; Hayes, Kent, England
- Died: 19 November 1917 (aged 71); Epsom, Surrey, England
- Batting: Right-handed

Domestic team information
- Years: Team
- 1868: Cambridgeshire

Career statistics
Competition	First-class
Matches	2
Runs scored	14
Batting average	3.50
100s/50s	0/0
Top score	7
Balls bowled	72
Wickets	0
Bowling average	–
5 wickets in innings	–
10 wickets in match	–
Best bowling	–
Catches/stumpings	1/–
- Source: Cricinfo, 13 March 2022

William Jesse Batchelor (14 November 1846 — 19 November 1917) was an English first-class cricketer, educator and clergyman.

The son of Jesse Batchelor, he was born in November 1846 at Hayes, Kent. He studied at Emmanuel College, Cambridge. He was a member of the Cambridge University Cricket Club, but declined a place in the eleven due to his busy study schedule. He did, however, play two first-class cricket matches for Cambridgeshire at Fenner's in 1868, against Cambridge University and Kent. He had little success in these matches, scoring 14 runs and failing to take a wicket. It was however noted by Wisden that had he taken his cricket more seriously, he may have become one of the famous bats of the day.

After graduating from Cambridge in 1870, Batchelor became an assistant master at Leamington College. He was ordained as a deacon in 1872 and became a priest at Worcester Cathedral the following year. His ecclesiastical duties coincided with his teaching at the college, with Batchelor holding the curacies of Leek Wootton (1872–74) and Christ Church, Leamington (1874–76). Toward the end of his employment at the college, he became the headmaster of the modern side. While based in Warwickshire, Batchelor played minor cricket matches for Warwickshire, then a second-class county. He left Leamington in 1882 to become reverend of Horsleydown in London, before moving to the West Country where he became vicar at Brompton Regis in 1894. He was vicar there until 1908, after which he came reverend of Whitestone in Devon until 1916. Batchelor did in November of the following year at Epsom, shortly after his 71st birthday.
