= John Page (cricketer) =

English cricketer

John Page (dates unknown) was an English professional cricketer who played from 1819 to 1822. He was mainly associated with Cambridge Town Club and made 5 known appearances.

== Bibliography ==
- Arthur Haygarth, Scores & Biographies, Volume 1 (1744–1826), Lillywhite, 1862
