= Henry Cornwell =

English cricketer

Personal information
- Full name: Henry Cornwell
- Born: 19 December 1822; Cambridge, Cambridgeshire, England
- Died: 19 September 1869 (aged 46); Hackney, Middlesex, England
- Batting: Right-handed
- Relatives: Edward Cornwell (brother)

Domestic team information
- Years: Team
- 1844–1849: Cambridgeshire

Career statistics
Competition	First-class
Matches	11
Runs scored	266
Batting average	15.64
100s/50s	–/1
Top score	61
Catches/stumpings	5/–
- Source: Cricinfo, 10 April 2022

Henry Cornwell (19 December 1822 — 19 September 1869) was an English first-class cricketer.

Cornwell was born at Cambridge in December 1822. He was a leading figure in Cambridgeshire cricket in the 1840s. He made his debut in first-class cricket for a Cambridge Town and County Club team in 1844 against Cambridge University at Parker's Piece, and was considered a cricketer of a high enough standard to play for an ad-hoc England in 1845 and 1846, with appearances against Nottinghamshire and Kent. He continued to play first-class cricket for Cambridgeshire representative sides until 1849, having made eleven appearances across first-class cricket since 1844. Cornwell was held in high regard by fellow players, with William Glover, a fellow Cambridgeshire cricketer, describing him as one of the few batsman able to take on the bowling of William Clarke. He scored 266 runs across his eleven first-class appearances, at an average of 15.64 and with a highest score of 61, which was his only score above fifty.

Cornwell was active in the Cambridge branch of the Conservative Party and was notorious for intimidating political opponents, raising mobs for hustings, and rumoured involved in voter fraud. In July 1846, he was convicted of assaulting a Mr. Stevens. He later moved to London with his wife following the 1853 Cambridge Commission into corruption. Cornwell died September 1869 at Hackney. His brother, Edward, was also a first-class cricketer.
