= Frederick Long =

English clergyman and cricketer

Frederick Edward Long (14 August 1815 – 8 April 1903) was an English clergyman and a cricketer who played first-class cricket for Cambridge University and Cambridge Town Club between 1836 and 1841. He was born at Windsor, Berkshire and died at Woodton, Norfolk.

Long was educated at Eton College where he was one of the two senior pupils picked for the Eton Montem in front of William IV and the Princess Victoria in the penultimate ceremony of the salt. He was also Eton's captain of cricket in 1835. He entered King's College, Cambridge, as a scholar in 1835 and was a "prizeman" there and a fellow from 1838 to 1855.

Long's first-class cricket career consisted of five matches spread over five different seasons from 1836 to 1841 – one a year, with the exception of 1838 – all for the Cambridge University side except the last, which was for the Cambridge Town Club against the university team. Scorecards are incomplete for all of his games and it is not known whether he was right- or left-handed; he appears to have played as a batsman and not to have bowled. His first first-class match was the University Match of 1836 against Oxford University; he opened the innings and scored 4 and 0. He did not appear in the University Match in other years.

Long graduated from Cambridge in 1840 but stayed as a Fellow at King's, also being awarded an ad eundem degree at Oxford University in 1845. He was ordained as a Church of England deacon in 1848 and as a priest in 1850; from 1856 to 1875 he was priest in charge at Butterton, Newcastle-under-Lyme, Staffordshire and he then moved to Woodton, Norfolk, where he was rector until his death in 1903.
