= Octavius Hammond =

English clergyman and cricketer

Octavius Hammond (19 March 1835 – 22 August 1908) was an English clergyman and a first-class cricketer who played for Cambridge University between 1855 and 1857. He was born in Newmarket, Suffolk and died at Herringswell, also in Suffolk.

Hammond played cricket for Cambridge University in eight matches that are now considered to be first-class across three seasons: three of the games were part of the University match series against Oxford University for which participants are awarded a Blue. He also played twice for a Cambridge Town Club aka Cambridgeshire side in first-class games and once for a team representing "The Gentlemen of England". A middle-order batsman, his best first-class innings was a score of 52 not out for the university side against the Cambridge Town Club in 1857.

== Career outside cricket ==
Hammond was a grandson of Charles Hammond (1749–1837) who founded a bank in Newmarket (taken over by Barclays Bank in 1905). He was educated at Uppingham School and Emmanuel College, Cambridge. On graduation, he was ordained as a Church of England priest and from 1867 to his death he was the rector of Herringswell in Suffolk. Shortly after his installation at Herringswell, and soon after a minor church renovation at St Ethelbert's Church, which was of 11th century origin, the thatched roof of the church caught fire during a Sunday morning service and the entire building was destroyed apart from the outer walls and the tower; contemporary reports note that the rector supervised the rescue of the church organ which he had himself donated. Hammond organised the rebuilding and engaged the services of the distinguished London architect Arthur Blomfield.
