= William Bird (cricketer) =

English cricketer

William Bird (born 17 April 1795) was an English cricketer associated with Cambridge Town Club who was active in the 1820s. He is recorded in two matches from 1821 to 1822, totalling 13 runs with a highest score of 8.

== Bibliography ==
- Haygarth, Arthur (1996) [1862]. Scores & Biographies, Volume 1 (1744–1826). Kennington: Frederick Lillywhite. ISBN 978-19-00592-23-9.
- Haygarth, Arthur (1997) [1862]. Scores & Biographies, Volume 2 (1827–1840). Kennington: Frederick Lillywhite. ISBN 978-19-00592-23-9.
