= John Emmerson (cricketer) =

English cricketer

John Emmerson (born 1796 at Cambridge; death details unknown) was an English cricketer who was associated with Cambridge Town Club and made his debut in 1827.

== Bibliography ==
- Haygarth, Arthur (1862). Scores & Biographies, Volume 2 (1827–1840). Lillywhite.
