= Robert Glasscock =

English cricketer

Personal information
- Full name: Robert Glasscock
- Born: 1797; Downham Market, Norfolk, England
- Died: 13 February 1878 (aged 80–81); March, Cambridgeshire, England
- Batting: Unknown

Domestic team information
- Years: Team
- 1832–1834: Cambridge Town Club

Career statistics
Competition	First-class
Matches	4
Runs scored	28
Batting average	4.66
100s/50s	–/–
Top score	18
Catches/stumpings	1/–
- Source: Cricinfo, 13 March 2022

Robert Glasscock (1797 — 13 February 1878) was an English first-class cricketer.

Glasscock was born in Norfolk at Downham Market in 1797. He was a leading figure in Cambridgeshire cricket in the 1830s, joining the Chatteris Cricket Club under the presidency of Thomas Fryer, having previously coached the newly established March Cricket Club from September 1827. He played first-class cricket for Cambridge Town Club from 1832 to 1834, making four appearances, playing twice each against the Marylebone Cricket Club in 1832 and Nottinghamshire. He scored 28 runs in his four matches, with a highest score of 18. In his later years he suffered from a disorder of the brain, which was a contributing factor in his suicide at March on 13 February 1878, having cut his throat.
