= Edward Cornwell =

English cricketer

Personal information
- Full name: Edward Cornwell
- Born: 10 September 1827; Cambridge, Cambridgeshire, England
- Died: 12 September 1873 (aged 46); Cambridge, Cambridgeshire, England
- Batting: Unknown
- Role: Wicket-keeper
- Relatives: Henry Cornwell (brother)

Domestic team information
- Years: Team
- 1851–1863: Cambridgeshire

Career statistics
Competition	First-class
Matches	11
Runs scored	133
Batting average	10.23
100s/50s	–/–
Top score	33
Catches/stumpings	6/3
- Source: Cricinfo, 23 May 2022

Edward Cornwell (10 September 1827 — 19 September 1873) was an English first-class cricketer.

Cornwell was born at Cambridge in September 1827. A professional cricketer, Cornwell was a prominent figures in Cambridgeshire cricket in the 1850s and early 1860s. He made his debut in first-class cricket for the Cambridge Town Club against Cambridge University at Fenner's in 1851, with Cornwell playing first-class cricket intermittently for various Cambridgeshire representative sides as a wicket-keeper until 1863, making eleven appearances. Across hus eleven appearances, he scored 133 runs in first-class cricket at an average of 10.23, with a highest score of 33; as a wicket-keeper he made three stumpings. Cornwell was employed as a professional by a number of clubs in the East of England between 1849 and 1863. He died at Cambridge in September 1873, two days after his 46th birthday. His older brother, Henry, was also a first-class cricketer.
