= John Boning =

English cricketer

John Boning (21 September 1805 – 12 April 1879) was an English cricketer associated with Cambridge Town Club who was active from 1822 to 1847. He is recorded in 35 matches, totalling 657 runs with a highest score of 65 and holding 36 catches. He took 54 wickets, achieving five wickets in an innings on six occasions and once took ten wickets in a match.

== Bibliography ==
- Haygarth, Arthur (1996) [1862]. Scores & Biographies, Volume 1 (1744–1826). Kennington: Frederick Lillywhite. ISBN 978-19-00592-23-9.
- Haygarth, Arthur (1997) [1862]. Scores & Biographies, Volume 2 (1827–1840). Kennington: Frederick Lillywhite. ISBN 978-19-00592-23-9.
