= Covent Garden, Cambridge =

Street in Cambridge, England

Coordinates: 52°12′1.5″N 0°8′3.5″E

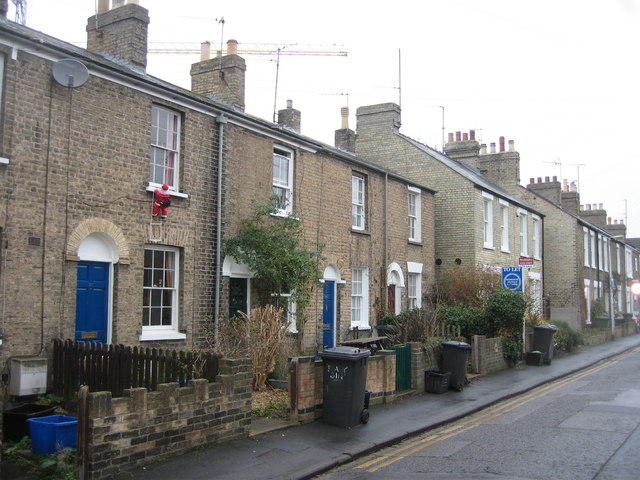
Terraced houses in Covent Garden, Cambridge.

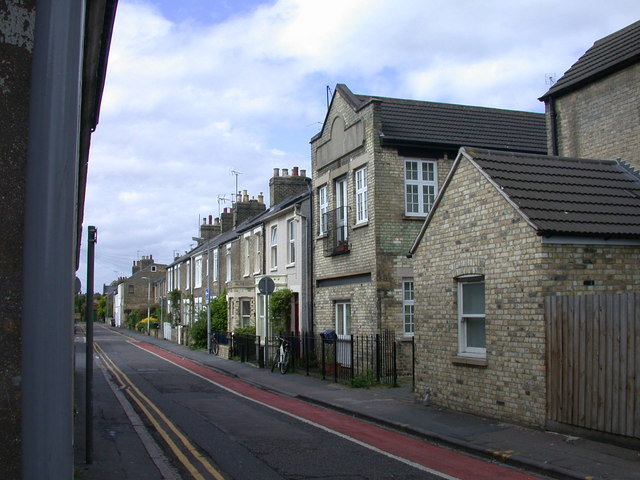
Another view of Covent Garden.

Covent Garden is a street in Cambridge, England, off Mill Road and near The Kite district. The street takes its name from the London market of the same name as there used to be a market garden there.

The street has one pub The Six Bells, where cricketer Israel Haggis was landlord from 1837 to 1844.
