= Henry William Fuller =

English physician and writer

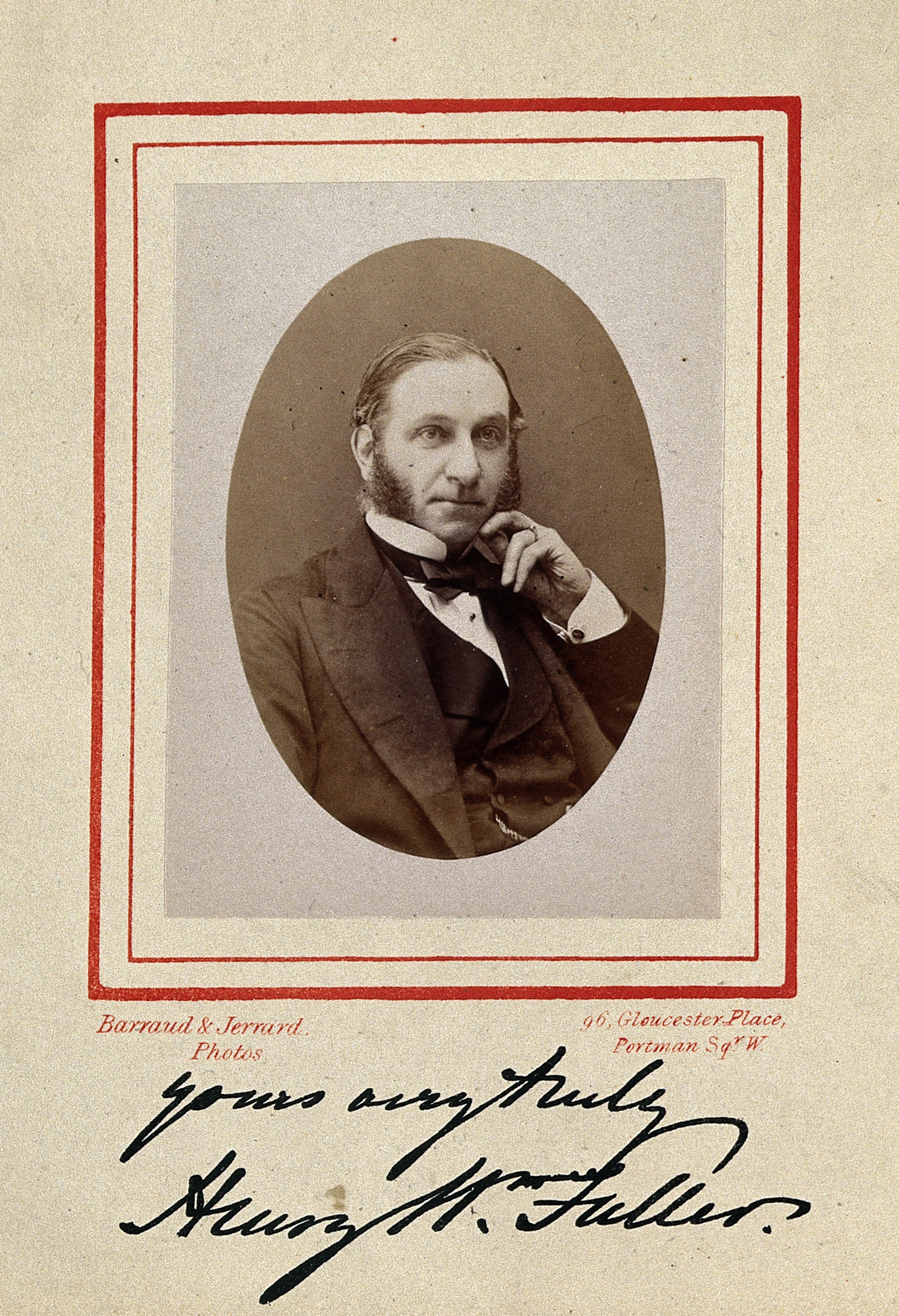
- Born: 1820; London
- Died: 18 December 1873 (aged 52–53)
- Occupation(s): Physician, writer

Henry William Fuller (1820 – 18 December 1873) F.R.C.P. was an English physician and writer.

Fuller was born in London. He was the son of surgeon Henry Peter Fuller. He was educated at Caius College, Cambridge and St George's Hospital. While studying at Cambridge, Fuller played one first-class cricket match for Cambridge Town Club against Cambridge University Cricket Club at Parker's Piece in 1841. He took his M.B. in 1843 and practiced in London. He was elected assistant physician at St George's Hospital and became full physician in 1857. Fuller advocated drug therapy and used alkalis for the treatment of rheumatism.

His best known work was On Rheumatism, Rheumatic Gout, and Sciatica, first published in 1853 and went through several editions. Fuller promoted the theory that gout and rheumatism were both a disease of abnormal metabolism. He suggested that lactic acid has the same relationship to rheumatism that uric acid does to gout, which is excess in the blood.

Fuller was a Fellow of the Royal College of Physicians. He gave the Lumleian Lectures in 1866. His brother, Ernest, was also a first-class cricketer.

== Selected publications ==
- On Rheumatism, Rheumatic Gout, and Sciatica (1854)
- On Diseases Of The Chest, Including Diseases Of The Heart And Great Vessels (1862)
