= Frederick Reynolds =

English cricketer (1833–1915)

Personal information
- Full name: Frederick Reginald Reynolds
- Born: 7 August 1833; Bottisham, Cambridgeshire, England
- Died: 18 April 1915 (aged 81); Chorlton-cum-Hardy, Lancashire, England
- Batting: Right-handed
- Bowling: Right-arm fast; Right-arm slow

Domestic team information
- Years: Team
- 1854–1867: Cambridge Town Club
- 1865–1874: Lancashire
- FC debut: 17 May 1854 Cambridge Town Club v Cambridge University
- Last FC: 3 August 1874 Lancashire] v Derbyshire

Career statistics
Competition	First-class
Matches	65
Runs scored	444
Batting average	5.55
100s/50s	0/0
Top score	34*
Balls bowled	8,514
Wickets	208
Bowling average	17.58
5 wickets in innings	11
10 wickets in match	0
Best bowling	6/58
Catches/stumpings	52/–
- Source: CricketArchive, 20 February 2011

Frederick Reginald Reynolds (7 August 1833 – 18 April 1915) was an English first-class cricketer who played for Cambridge Town Club and other Cambridge-based sides from 1854 to 1867, and for Lancashire County Cricket Club from 1865 to 1874.

== Biography ==
Reynolds was born on 7 August 1833, at Bottisham. He became a professional cricketer and was employed at Charterhouse School in 1853 and 1854. He played intermittently for Cambridge Town Club from 1854 to 1867. During this period, he was a professional groundstaff bowler with Marylebone Cricket Club (MCC) in 1855. From 1856 to 1857, he was at Botesdale, Suffolk. In 1858, he played for the United All England Eleven (UEE) on tour; in 1859 and 1860 he made similar tours with the All England Eleven (AEE). In 1861, he joined Manchester Cricket Club as a ground bowler and then became ground manager. In 1865, he made his debut for Lancashire, playing for them until 1874. He achieved two five-wicket innings in 1865 and one in 1866. The match against Surrey at Old Trafford on 26 May 1870 was played as his benefit match. During the 1870 season he achieved two five-wicket innings. In November 1870, he was promoted to the offices of Acting Assistant Secretary, Collector and General Manager of the Manchester Cricket Club. In the 1871 season, he achieved two more five-wicket innings.

Reynolds was initially a right-hand fast roundarm bowler with a break-back from the off and an easy action. He was later a slow underarm bowler. He took 208 first-class wickets at an average of 17.58 and with a best performance of six for 58. He was a hard-hitting tail-end right-handed batsman and played 106 innings in 65 first-class matches with an average of 5.55 and a top score of 34 not out.
