= Arthur Hoare (cricketer, born 1840) =

English cricketer (1840–1896)

Personal information
- Born: 16 September 1840; Withyham, Sussex
- Died: 26 December 1896 (aged 56); Edenbridge, Kent
- Batting: Right-handed

Domestic team information
- Years: Team
- 1869–1873: Sussex
- 1871: Kent

Career statistics
Competition	First-class
Matches	3
Runs scored	87
Batting average	14.50
100s/50s	0/0
Top score	39
Balls bowled	52
Wickets	1
Bowling average	37.00
5 wickets in innings	0
10 wickets in match	0
Best bowling	1/37
Catches/stumpings	1/0
- Source: ESPNcricinfo, 4 May 2013

Arthur Hoare (16 September 1840 – 26 December 1896) was an English amateur cricketer. Hoare was a right-handed batsman, who played in first-class cricket matches for both Sussex County Cricket Club and Kent County Cricket Club. He played in a number of minor matches for teams such as Marylebone Cricket Club (MCC) between 1863 and 1883.

Hoare was born at Withyham in Sussex in 1840. He made his first-class debut for Sussex against Kent in 1869 at Tunbridge Wells before going on to play for Kent in 1871 against WG Grace's XI at Maidstone. He made his final first-class appearance cricket for Sussex against Yorkshire in 1873 at Sheffield.

He died at Edenbridge in Kent in December 1896, aged 56.

== Bibliography ==
- Carlaw, Derek (2020). Kent County Cricketers, A to Z: Part One (1806–1914) (PDF). Cardiff: ACS.
