= Joseph Grout =

English cricketer (1816–1875)

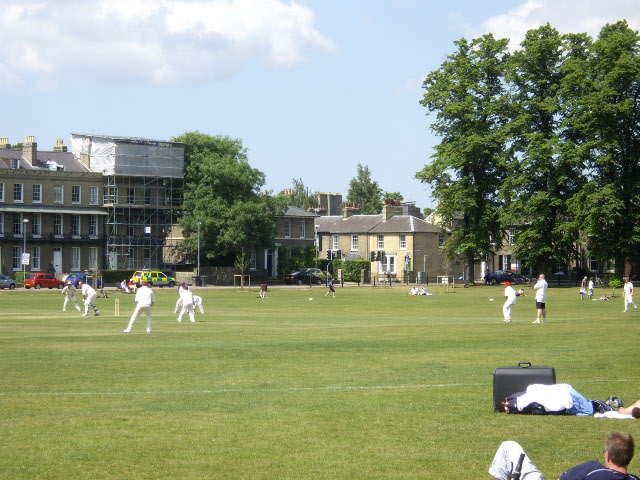
- A cricket match on Parker's Piece, where Grout played many of his matches,

Personal information
- Full name: Joseph Grout
- Born: 1 August 1816; Puckeridge, Hertfordshire
- Died: 11 October 1875 (aged 59); Forest Hill, London
- Role: Batsman

Domestic team information
- Years: Team
- 1838–1839: Cambridge University
- 1838: Cambridge Town Club
- 1839: Oxford and Cambridge Universities
- First-class debut: 17 May 1838 Cambridge University v Marylebone Cricket Club
- Last First-class: 20 June 1839 Oxford and Cambridge Universities v Marylebone Cricket Club

Career statistics
| Competition | FC |
|---|---|
| Matches | 8 |
| Runs scored | 148 |
| Batting average | 12.33 |
| 100s/50s | 0/0 |
| Top score | 28 |
| Balls bowled | 0 |
| Wickets | 0 |
| Bowling average | – |
| 5 wickets in innings | 0 |
| 10 wickets in match | 0 |
| Best bowling | – |
| Catches/stumpings | 2/0 |
- Source: CricInfo, 21 June 2013

Joseph Grout (1 August 1816 – 11 October 1875) was an English first-class cricketer. An alumnus of St John's College, Cambridge, Grout played eight first-class matches for the University cricket team during his time there. He played for the University's Second XI in 1837 – scoring six and six, and then for the First XI in an unofficial match scoring 20 and 12 – before graduating to first-class cricket in May 1838 in time to face the Marylebone Cricket Club. He played seven more matches in the summers of 1838 and 1839 for both the Cambridge University team and the Cambridge Town cricket club, facing the MCC and Oxford University teams.

== Career ==
Grout was born in August 1816 in Puckeridge, a hamlet in East Hertfordshire, England. He attended Cambridge University in 1837 and made two appearances for the Second XI of the University Cricket Club. In first, on 13 May, he scored six runs in both innings as the Second XI faced the First XI at Parker's Piece cricket ground, a square green common located near the centre of Cambridge known primarily as the birthplace of the rules of Association Football. He played a week later, on 20 May, for the First XI against an invitational side entitled Lincoln's Inn and Temple, a team who played several non-first-class games against Cambridge and the MXX in the 1830s and 1840s. He made scores of 20 and 12.

Graduating to first-class cricket in 1838, Grout made his first appearance against the MCC on 17 May at Parker's Piece, where he made 14 as Cambridge took a decisive nine-wicket victory. He then moved down the batting order and scored one and 17 in a rain-affected match against Cambridge Town cricket club, followed by five and 15 against Oxford University on 6 July. In total he scored 69 runs across his four matches in the summer of 1838, at a batting average of 11.50.

Grout continued to play for the University team in the summer of 1839. He faced Cambridge Town once more on 16 May, making 14 and zero, followed by 19 – then a career best – against the MCC on 23 May. Following a score of 18 against Oxford University, Grout then made his career-best score in what would be his final match. Against the MCC at Lord's Cricket Ground he made 28 in the first innings before falling to James Cobbett, followed by a duck in the second. His second and final season had yielded 79 runs at 13.16.
