= John Bowtell =

English topographer (1753–1813)

John Bowtell (1753–1813) was an English topographer.

== Life ==
Bowtell was born in the parish of Holy Trinity, Cambridge, in 1753, became a bookbinder and stationer there. He compiled a history of the town to include the university and Barnwell Priory, keeping it by him unprinted; collected fossils, manuscripts, and other curiosities; and was a member of the London College Youths. He was also an enthusiastic bell-ringer, and in 1788, at Great St. Mary's, Cambridge, he rang on the 30-cwt. tenor bell as many as 6,609 harmonious changes 'in the method of bob maximus, generally termed "twelve-in."'

== Death and legacy ==
Bowtell had no family, and dying on 1 December 1813, aged 60, he made the following important bequests for the benefit of Cambridge: £7,000. to enlarge Addenbrooke's Hospital; £1,000. to repair Holy Trinity; £500. to repair St. Michael's; £500. to apprentice boys belonging to Hobson's workhouse; and his 'History of the Town' and other manuscripts, his books, his fossils, and curiosities, to Downing College. He was buried at St. Michael's, where the Addenbrooke's Hospital governors erected a tablet to his memory. The governors also placed a portrait of him in their court-room.
