= Charles Arnold (cricketer) =

English cricketer

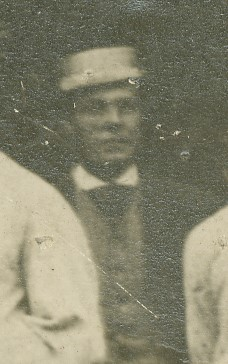

Personal information
- Full name: Charles Arnold
- Born: 12 January 1823; Cambridge, Cambridgeshire, England
- Died: 1 February 1873 (aged 50); Cambridge, Cambridgeshire, England
- Height: 5 ft 7 in (1.70 m)
- Batting: Right-handed
- Bowling: Unknown-arm roundarm fast
- Relatives: Mark Arnold (brother)

Domestic team information
- Years: Team
- 1847: Suffolk
- 1857: Cambridgeshire

Career statistics
Competition	First-class
Matches	22
Runs scored	203
Batting average	6.76
100s/50s	–/–
Top score	29
Balls bowled	1,106
Wickets	133
Bowling average	9.55
5 wickets in innings	13
10 wickets in match	5
Best bowling	8/?
Catches/stumpings	23/–
- Source: Cricinfo, 4 February 2022

Charles Arnold (12 January 1823 — 1 February 1873) was an English first-class cricketer.

The son of James Arnold, a coach builder, he was born at Cambridge in February 1822. Little is known about Arnold's early years, though it is possible he was a baker's apprentice.

Pursuing a career as a professional cricketer, Arnold made his debut in first-class cricket for Cambridge Town Club against Cambridge University at Parker's Piece in 1843. Arnold played first-class cricket over a fifteen year period, making a total of 22 appearances; the majority of these came for Cambridge-based teams, though he also appeared for Suffolk in 1847, and in 1853 for both an All England Eleven and the North in the North v South fixture. His professional career as a cricketer was supported by the University of Cambridge. Described by Denison as "a very fast and good bowler", he took 133 wickets in first-class cricket at an average of 9.55; he took a five wicket haul on 13 occasions and took ten wickets in a match on five occasions. Denison also described Arnold as a "capital fielder" but an "unsteady bat". He was engaged in club cricket by various sides club sides throughout England between 1842 and 1868.

In 1866 Charles Arnold, or possibly his brother Mark Arnold, was the cricket professional coach at Forest School. For the following season the school wrote to him to offer him another contract for 1867 but the letter never arrived, so he instead became the coach of Trinity College, Cambridge in 1867.

Arnold died at Cambridge in February 1873 and was buried at the Mill Road Cemetery. His brother, Mark, was also a first-class cricketer.
