= Charles Pryor (cricketer) =

English cricketer (1815–1897)

Charles Stuart Pryor (15 February 1815 – 4 April 1897) was an English cricketer who played first-class cricket for the Cambridge Town Club, Cambridge University and an England XI between 1833 and 1859. He was born at Cambridge and died at Chesterton, Cambridgeshire.

Pryor was a right-handed batsman and a bowler, though his bowling style is not known. He played regularly for the Cambridge Town Club for more than a quarter of a century, and also played for the Cambridge Town and County Club and the Cambridge Townsmen teams, which were alternative names for the same side. In 1839, he played a single game for Cambridge University, but there is no record that he was ever a student at the university, and 23 of his first-class matches were against the university side; the same year he also appeared for "An England XI" against the Marylebone Cricket Club, but otherwise his first-class matches were all for Cambridge teams. His single game for Cambridge University was one of his more successful with the bat, as he scored 27 in each innings. His highest score – more than three times more than any other innings he played – was an innings of 103 for the Cambridge Town and County Club against Cambridge University in 1844.

Pryor's father Stephen and his son Frederick both played first-class cricket for the Cambridge Town Club; his son also played for Cambridgeshire in the period when that side's matches were sometimes rated as first-class.
