= Ralph Arber =

English cricketer

Personal information
- Full name: Ralph Arber
- Born: 10 May 1846; Cambridge, England

Domestic team information
- Years: Team
- 1871: Cambridgeshire
- FC debut: 22 June 1871 Cambridgeshire v Surrey

Career statistics
Competition	First-class
Matches	1
Runs scored	6
Batting average	3
100s/50s	0/0
Top score	6
Balls bowled	144
Wickets	2
Bowling average	25.50
5 wickets in innings	0
10 wickets in match	0
Best bowling	2/29
Catches/stumpings	0/–
- Source: CricketArchive, 18 October 2008

Ralph Arber (born 10 May 1846; details of death unknown) was an English first-class cricketer who played for Cambridgeshire County Cricket Club. He was born in Cambridge.

Arber made a single first-class appearance for the team against Surrey in 1871. Arber, batting as a tailender, scored 0 and 6 in the two innings in which he batted, and bowled in both innings, taking figures of 2/29 and 0/22.
