= Samuel Bowtell =

English cricketer

Samuel Bowtell (7 December 1806 – May 1881) was an English cricketer who was associated with Cambridge Town Club (CTC) and made his debut in 1830.

== Bibliography ==
- Haygarth, Arthur (1996) [1862]. Scores & Biographies, Volume 1 (1744–1826). Kennington: Frederick Lillywhite. ISBN 978-19-00592-23-9.
- Haygarth, Arthur (1997) [1862]. Scores & Biographies, Volume 2 (1827–1840). Kennington: Frederick Lillywhite. ISBN 978-19-00592-23-9.
