= William Massey (cricketer) =

English cricketer

William Morton Massey (11 April 1846 – 19 April 1899) was an English cricketer who played first-class cricket for Somerset in 1882 and for Lancashire in 1883. He was born in Manchester (then in Lancashire, England) and died in New York City, United States.

Massey was a middle-order batsman who played cricket for Somerset teams in the years immediately before the county club was granted first-class status in 1882; he also played for other amateur sides, such as the "Gentlemen of Devon" in this period. His sole first-class appearance for Somerset came in 1882, and the following year he made a single first-class appearance for Lancashire, for whom he was qualified by birth. He was not successful in either of his first-class games, his highest score being just 5.

After the mid-1880s, Massey was resident in New York. He played cricket into the mid-1890s for the Staten Island Athletic Club in league and local matches against, for example, the Staten Island Cricket Club.
