= Daniel Murcutt =

English cricketer and police officer

Personal information
- Full name: Daniel Docwras Murcutt
- Born: 15 January 1817; Cambridge, Cambridgeshire, England
- Died: January 1853 (aged 35/36); Cambridge, Cambridgeshire, England
- Batting: Unknown
- Relatives: Robert Murcutt (father)

Domestic team information
- Years: Team
- 1837–1842: Cambridge Town Club

Career statistics
Competition	First-class
Matches	5
Runs scored	19
Batting average	3.16
100s/50s	–/–
Top score	13*
Catches/stumpings	1/–
- Source: Cricinfo, 9 April 2022

Daniel Docwras Murcutt (15 January 1817 — January 1853) was an English first-class cricketer.

The son of the cricketer Robert Murcutt, he was born at Cambridge in January 1817. Murcutt made his debut in first-class cricket for the Cambridge Town Club against Cambridge University at Parker's Piece in 1837. He played first-class cricket for the Town Club until 1842, making five appearances. Playing as a batsman, he scored 19 runs at a low average of 3.16 and with a highest score 13 not out. Murcutt died at Cambridge in January 1853.
