= Harry Fuller (cricketer) =

South African cricketer (1896–1974)

Personal information
- Born: 5 October 1896; East London, South Africa
- Died: 13 October 1974 (aged 78); East London, South Africa
- Source: Cricinfo, 6 December 2020

Harry Fuller (5 October 1896 – 13 October 1974) was a South African cricketer. He played in eight first-class matches from 1920/21 to 1926/27.
