= Robert Murcutt =

English cricketer

Personal information
- Born: c. 1791; Grantchester, Cambridge
- Died: 1835 (aged 43–44); Cambridge

Domestic team information
- Years: Team
- 1819–1820: Cambridge Town Club
- Source: CricketArchive, 24 March 2013

Robert Murcutt (c. 1791 – 1835) was an English cricketer associated with the Cambridge Town Club who played in the 1820s. He is recorded in two matches, totalling 20 runs with a highest score of 13 not out. His son, Daniel, was also a cricketer.

== Bibliography ==
- Haygarth, Arthur (1862). Scores & Biographies, Volume 1 (1744–1826). Lillywhite.
