= Daniel Hayward (cricketer, born 1832) =

English cricketer

Personal information
- Full name: Daniel Hayward
- Born: 19 October 1832; Chatteris, Cambridgeshire, England
- Died: 30 May 1910 (aged 77); Cambridge, Cambridgeshire, England
- Batting: Right-handed
- Relatives: Daniel Hayward senior (father); Tom Hayward (son); Thomas Hayward (brother)

Domestic team information
- Years: Team
- 1854: Surrey
- 1861–1869: Cambridgeshire

Career statistics
Competition	First-class
Matches	43
Runs scored	690
Batting average	10.00
100s/50s	–/2
Top score	59
Catches/stumpings	18/–
- Source: Cricinfo, 11 February 2022

Daniel Hayward (9 October 1832 — 30 May 1910) was an English first-class cricketer.

The son of the cricketer Daniel Hayward, he was born at Chatteris in Cambridgeshire in October 1832. Pursuing a career as a professional cricketer, Hayward made his debut in first-class cricket for Cambridge Town Club against Cambridge University at Fenner's in 1852. He made one first-class appearance for Surrey in 1854, on the mistaken belief that he was born in Surrey. The Hayward family was an old Mitcham family, and his father had indeed played for Surrey; however, with Hayward being born in Cambridgeshire, he was strictly speaking not eligible to play for Surrey. Hayward continued to play first-class cricket until 1869, making a total of 41 appearances for various Cambridgeshire representative sides. He also played once for an All England Eleven against Yorkshire in 1862. Described by Wisden as a "good bat", he scored 690 runs at an average of exactly 10; he made two scores of over fifty, with a highest score of 59 against Cambridge University in 1854. In addition to play first-class cricket, Hayward also umpired it, standing in five matches between 1861 and 1875.

After the end of his cricket career he became an inn-keeper at the Prince Regent Inn in Cambridge, alongside being a cricket and football outfitter. He died at Cambridge in May 1910, having been ill for a number of days prior. His brother was Thomas Hayward, considered the more famous cricketer of the two and considered the best batsman in England at the time. His son was Tom Hayward, who besides playing for Surrey, also represented England in Test cricket.
