= Philip Sankey =

English cricketer and clergyman

Personal information
- Full name: Philip Menzies Sankey
- Born: 17 April 1830; Brompton, Middlesex, England
- Died: 9 March 1909 (aged 78); Montreux, Vaud, Switzerland
- Batting: Right-handed
- Bowling: Right-arm
- Relatives: Sir Edmund Filmer, 8th Baronet (father-in-law)

Domestic team information
- Years: Team
- 1848: Cambridge University
- 1850–1852: Oxford University
- 1852: Kent
- FC debut: 21 June 1848 Cambridge University v Gentlemen of Kent
- Last FC: 8 July 1852 Oxford University v Cambridge University
- Source: CricInfo, 25 June 2022

Philip Menzies Sankey (17 April 1830 – 9 March 1909) was an English clergyman and cricketer. He played first-class cricket for both Cambridge and Oxford Universities as well as for Kent County Cricket Club and served as a clergyman in Hampshire, Italy and Switzerland.

== Early life and cricket ==
He was born at Brompton in Middlesex in 1830, the eldest son of Richard and Mary Sankey (née Boys). His father was a Church of England clergyman at Farnham in Surrey and Witney in Oxfordshire, and Sankey was educated at The King's School, Canterbury. Whilst still at school he played in a first-class cricket match for Cambridge University, playing against the Gentlemen of Kent at the St Lawrence Ground during the 1848 Canterbury Cricket Week, probably as a late replacement for another player.

Sankey went up to Corpus Christi College, Oxford in 1848, graduating in 1852; his father was a Fellow of the college, having graduated in 1824. He played club cricket for Farnham, where his father was the Rector, between 1849 and 1852, and in three more first-class cricket matches, playing for Oxford University in 1850 and 1852 and making a single appearance for Kent County Cricket Club in 1852. His last first-class match was the 1852 University Match against Cambridge. He played in minor matches whilst at Oxford, including for Oxfordshire against the All England Eleven in 1850 and for the Gentlemen of Enlgland against the Gentlemen of Sussex the following year. In his four first-class matches he scored a total of 56 runs and took eight wickets, all in the 1852 University Match. His highest score of 27 was made in the same match.

== Professional life ==
After graduating, Sankey worked as a master at The Kings School between 1852 and 1855. He was ordained as a Deacon in 1853 and as a priest in 1854 and was a canon at St Alphege and St Mary's church in Canterbury before serving as the rector of Highclere in Hampshire, between 1858 and 1868. He was chaplain at Pegli in Genoa from 1869 to 1872 before moving to Montreux in Switzerland where he was minister at St John's Anglican church between 1879 and 1907. During his time at St Johns, Sankey oversaw extensive building work at the church which was expanded three times, the original building having only been completed the year before Sankey's arrival.

Sankey wrote Prayers for Church Families and two catechism texts, Catechetical and Devotional Manual and Catechism of Old Testament History, a text which was designed for use in Sunday Schools and was considered "second to none" by The Literary Churchman in 1858.

== Family and later life ==
Sankey married Helen Filmer, the daughter of Sir Edmund Filmer, 8th Baronet, in 1858; the couple had four children. Sankey died at Montreux in 1909 aged 79.

== Bibliography ==
- Carlaw, Derek (2020). Kent County Cricketers, A to Z: Part One (1806–1914) (PDF). Cardiff: ACS.
