= Benjamin Dark =

English cricketer

Benjamin Francis Dark (10 November 1793 – 30 May 1836) was an English amateur cricketer who made six known appearances from 1814 to 1826. He was the elder brother of James Dark.

He was mainly associated with Middlesex and Hampshire.

== Bibliography ==
- Haygarth, Arthur (1996) [1862]. Scores & Biographies, Volume 1 (1744–1826). Kennington: Frederick Lillywhite. ISBN 978-19-00592-23-9.
- Haygarth, Arthur (1997) [1862]. Scores & Biographies, Volume 2 (1827–1840). Kennington: Frederick Lillywhite. ISBN 978-19-00592-23-9.
