= Henry Francis (cricketer) =

English cricketer, clergyman and academic

Personal information
- Full name: Henry Calver Francis
- Born: 16 December 1826; Southwold, Suffolk, England
- Died: 16 May 1866 (aged 39); Godmanchester, Huntingdonshire, England
- Batting: Unknown

Domestic team information
- Years: Team
- 1849–1862: Cambridgeshire

Career statistics
Competition	First-class
Matches	7
Runs scored	218
Batting average	24.22
100s/50s	1/–
Top score	114
Catches/stumpings	3/–
- Source: Cricinfo, 25 May 2022

Henry Calver Francis (16 December 1826 — 16 May 1866) was an English first-class cricketer and umpire.

Francis was born in December 1826 in Southwold, Suffolk. He was a prominent figure in Cambridgeshire cricket between 1849 and 1862, making his debut in first-class cricket for a Cambridgeshire representative side in 1849 against Cambridge University at Fenner's. He featured intermittently for Cambridgeshire sides in first-class cricket until 1862, making seven appearances. Playing as a batsman, he scored 218 runs at an average of 24.22, with one century, a score of 114, which came against Cambridge University in 1857. In addition to playing, Francis also stood as an umpire in a first-class match between Cambridgeshire and Surrey in 1862. Francis died at Godmanchester in May 1866.
