= William Cornwell (cricketer) =

English cricketer

Personal information
- Full name: William Lofts Cornwell
- Born: 27 August 1838; Bottisham, Cambridgeshire, England
- Died: 21 April 1915 (aged 76); Bottisham, Cambridgeshire, England
- Batting: Unknown
- Role: Wicket-keeper

Domestic team information
- Years: Team
- 1864–1868: Cambridgeshire

Career statistics
Competition	First-class
Matches	5
Runs scored	22
Batting average	4.40
100s/50s	–/–
Top score	12
Catches/stumpings	3/1
- Source: Cricinfo, 23 May 2022

William Lofts Cornwell (27 August 1838 — 21 April 1915) was an English first-class cricketer.

Cornwell as born in August 1838 at Bottisham, Cambridgeshire. He was active in Cambridgeshire cricket following the demise of the Cambridge Town and County Club in 1848. A middle-order batsman and wicket-keeper, he played first-class cricket for Cambridgeshire on five occasions between 1864 and 1868, beginning with his debut against Yorkshire at Parker's Piece. His five first-class matches yielded him just 22 runs with a highest score of 12, while in his capacity as wicket-keeper he took three catches and made a single stumping. Outside of cricket, Cornwell was employed as a servant at the University of Cambridge by St John's College. He died at Bottisham in April 1915, two hours after falling ill.
