= Martin Page (botanist) =

Dr Martin Lewis Page (born 14 May 1953) is an English botanist, ecologist and plant photographer.

Page was born in Birmingham and educated at University College, Swansea, taking his PhD at the University of Exeter in 1980, with a thesis entitled "A phytosociological classification of British neutral grasslands". He worked as a photographer in Brighton for several years before becoming managing director of manufacturing company Dangerfield & Page. In 2001 he became news editor of The Garden, the magazine of the Royal Horticultural Society, and since 2005 he has worked as an ecological consultant.

He contributed to the British National Vegetation Classification and was the first person to describe the British NVC community MG10 (Juncus effusus-Holcus lanatus rush pasture plant community).

Page is an expert on peonies and President of the Peony Society (UK).

== Works ==
- The Gardener's Guide to Growing Peonies (1997)
- AHS Plants for Every Season (American Horticultural Society Practical Guides) (2003)
- The Gardener's Peony: Herbaceous and Tree Peonies (2005)
- Growing Citrus: The Essential Gardener's Guide (2008)
- Name That Plant: An Illustrated Guide (foreword; 2008)
- Royal Horticultural Society: What Plant When (with Andrea Loom and Simon Maughan; Dorling Kindersley, 2011)
