= Wally Bowtell =

Australian rules footballer

Personal information
- Full name: Walter Walmsley Bowtell
- Born: 26 January 1895; Collingwood, Victoria
- Died: 23 March 1975 (aged 80); Preston, Victoria
- Original team: Northcote

Playing career^{1}
Years	Club	Games (Goals)
1917	Richmond	1 (1)
1918	Northcote (VFA)	2 (0)
- ^{1} Playing statistics correct to the end of 1917.

Walter Walmsley Bowtell (26 January 1895 – 23 March 1975) was an Australian rules footballer who played with Richmond in the Victorian Football League (VFL).
