= Frederick Pryor (cricketer) =

English cricketer

Personal information
- Full name: Frederick Charles Pryor
- Born: 10 November 1844; Cambridge, Cambridgeshire, England
- Died: Unknown
- Batting: Right-handed
- Bowling: Right-arm roundarm fast
- Relatives: Charles Pryor (father); Stephen Pryor (grandfather)

Domestic team information
- Years: Team
- 1861: Cambridge Town Club
- 1863–1871: Cambridgeshire

Career statistics
Competition	First-class
Matches	25
Runs scored	486
Batting average	11.04
100s/50s	–/3
Top score	69
Catches/stumpings	16/3
- Source: Cricinfo, 10 September 2019

Frederick Charles Pryor (10 November 1844 – date of death unknown) was an English first-class cricketer.

The son of the cricketer Charles Pryor, he was born in November 1844 at Cambridge. He made his debut in first-class cricket for Cambridge Town Club (CTC) against Cambridge University at Parker's Piece in 1861, with Pryor appearing in a second first-class match in the same season for CTC against Cambridge University at Fenner's. His next first-class appearance came for Cambridgeshire (essentially CTC) in 1863 against the Marylebone Cricket Club. He played first-class cricket for Cambridgeshire until 1871, making 22 appearances. In his 22 matches, he scored a total of 461 runs at an average of 12.13, with a high score of 69, which was one of three half centuries he made. He also made a single first-class appearance for the North in the North v South fixture of 1864. His grandfather, Stephen Pryor, also played first-class cricket.
