= Martin Page (cricketer) =

English cricketer

Martin Page (born 1 January 1800 at Cambridge; died 28 February 1874 at Cambridge) was an English professional cricketer who played from 1820 to 1834 for Cambridge Town Club, making 13 known appearances.

== Bibliography ==
- Arthur Haygarth, Scores & Biographies, Volumes 1–2 (1744–1840), Lillywhite, 1862
