= William Newby (Cambridgeshire cricketer) =

English cricketer

William John Newby (26 March 1836 – 1932) was an English first-class cricketer active 1858 who played for Cambridge Town Club (aka Cambridgeshire). He was born in Cambridge; died in Auckland.
