= Murcott =

Murcott may refer to:

== Places in England ==
- Murcott, Northamptonshire
- Murcott, Oxfordshire
- Murcott, Wiltshire

== Other uses ==
- Murcott (fruit) is a citrus variety
