= Robert Ringwood =

English cricketer

Personal information
- Full name: Robert Ringwood
- Born: 15 April 1815; Cambridge, Cambridgeshire, England
- Died: 8 February 1875 (aged 59); Cambridge, Cambridgeshire, England
- Height: 5 ft 9 in (1.75 m)

Domestic team information
- Years: Team
- 1840–1849: Cambridge Town Club

Career statistics
Competition	First-class
Matches	16
Runs scored	274
Batting average	12.45
100s/50s	0/0
Top score	49
Balls bowled	381
Wickets	28
Bowling average	?
5 wickets in innings	3
10 wickets in match	0
Best bowling	6/?
Catches/stumpings	5/–
- Source: Cricinfo, 12 February 2022

Robert Ringwood (15 April 1815 — 18 February 1875) was an English first-class cricketer.

Ringwood was born at Cambridge in April 1815. A professional cricketer, he made his debut in first-class cricket for Cambridge Town Club against Cambridge University at Parker's Piece in 1840. He played for a variety of Cambridge-based teams in first-class cricket, making a total of sixteen appearances to 1849. Ringwood was initially selected in the Cambridge team on his bowling, with him taking 28 wickets in first-class cricket, including three five wicket hauls. Denison, in his book Cricket. Sketches of the Players described how in the three years prior to 1846, Ringwood's bowling had become less effective, while also describing him as a "very powerful hitter" when batting. He scored 274 runs in first-class matches, though never passed fifty, with a highest score of 49. Following his first-class career, Ringwood was employed as a clerk at the University of Cambridge by Trinity College in 1870, and in 1872 by Christ's College. Ringwood died at Cambridge in February 1875, his wife having predeceased him by three years.
