= John Kirwan (cricketer) =

English cricketer

John Henry Kirwan (25 December 1816 – 13 June 1899) was an English amateur cricketer who played first-class cricket from 1836 to 1842. Mainly associated with Cambridge University Cricket Club, he made 18 known appearances in first-class matches and had three brothers who all played first-class cricket.

== Career ==
Kirwan, a right arm fast roundarm bowler, was known as "Wacky". He "bowled jerkily with a low arm, but at a very fast pace". He made his name as a schoolboy player at Eton College, his outstanding performance being to take all ten MCC wickets (all bowled) in 1835. He took a total of 26 wickets in just two matches for Eton that season. He went up to King's College, Cambridge in the same year, and played for the university team thereafter, his cricket career ending when he finally left Cambridge in 1842 to become a curate at St Feock in Cornwall.

Kirwan had an outstanding first-class debut in May 1836 when he played for the university versus Cambridge Town Club at Parker's Piece and took 15 wickets (all bowled) with six in the first innings and nine in the second.

Kirwan's overall first-class career record was 108 wickets (i.e., bowled only) in just 18 matches, a very high rate of six wickets per game. His 9 wickets on debut was his best single performance. He took 5 wickets in an innings 11 times and 10 wickets in a match 3 times. He was less successful as a right-handed batsman, scoring just 293 runs with a highest of 41. He is credited with only 3 catches and so was almost certainly an outfielder.
