= Walter Watts (cricketer) =

English cricketer

Walter Watts (7 March 1827 – 29 July 1910) was an English first-class cricketer active from 1866 to 1869 who played for Cambridge Town Club (aka Cambridgeshire). He was born in Wimpole and died in Cambridge. He appeared in 11 first-class matches as a right-handed batsman who bowled right-arm roundarm slow pace. He scored 23 runs with a highest score of 9* and held four catches. He took 43 wickets with a best analysis of seven for 46.
