= George Tarrant =

English cricketer

George Frederick Tarrant (7 December 1838 in Cambridge – 2 July 1870 in Cambridge) was an English professional cricketer who played from 1860 to 1869. Mainly associated with Cambridge Town Club (aka Cambridgeshire), Tarrant made 71 known appearances.

Tarrant was a member of the second English team to tour Australia, travelling out on the SS Great Britain in 1863. The team played several matches in Australia before travelling to New Zealand where they played five games. They returned to Australia to complete the remainder of the 19 tour matches.

Tarrant was a right arm fast bowler who was for a time rated the second fastest bowler in England after John Jackson. He bowled roundarm around the wicket from a "long, lively run-up".

Tarrant took 421 wickets at 11.89 with a best analysis of 10/40. He took five wickets in an innings 41 times and ten wickets in a match 16 times.

== Sources ==
- Frith, David (1975). The Fast Men. TransWorld Publishing. ISBN 0-552-10435-3.
