= George Boudier =

English cricketer

George John Boudier (5 September 1820 – 18 December 1899) was an English amateur cricketer who played from 1840 to 1847.

George Boudier was born at Warwick and educated at Eton College and St John's College, Cambridge. Mainly associated with Cambridge University and Cambridge Town Club, he made 17 known appearances in important matches. He played for the Gentlemen in the Gentlemen v Players series.

Boudier later became a clergyman, serving as a Chaplain to the Forces in the Crimean War; he was rector of Ewhurst from 1863 to his death at Ewhurst, Sussex.

== Bibliography ==
- Haygarth, Arthur (1996) [1862]. Scores & Biographies, Volume 1 (1744–1826). Kennington: Frederick Lillywhite. ISBN 978-19-00592-23-9.
- Haygarth, Arthur (1997) [1862]. Scores & Biographies, Volume 2 (1827–1840). Kennington: Frederick Lillywhite. ISBN 978-19-00592-23-9.
