= Arthur Hoare (cricketer, born 1821) =

English cricketer

Arthur Malortie Hoare (18 September 1821 – 26 February 1894) was an English first-class cricketer active between 1844 and 1849.. He played in 21 first-class matches. He subsequently became an Anglican priest.

Hoare was born in Blandford Forum, Dorset, a son of Charles Hoare who was also an Anglican priest. He studied at St John's College, Cambridge, where he graduated BA in 1844. He remained at Cambridge and won the Hulsean prize (established under the will of John Hulse) in 1846. He was a fellow of St John's 1847–53. He won a cricket blue in 1844 and was captain in 1846. He was ordained as a Church of England priest in 1849 and was rector of Calbourne, Isle of Wight, 1853–63 and of Fawley, Hampshire, from 1863 until his death there in 1894.
