= James Dark =

English cricketer

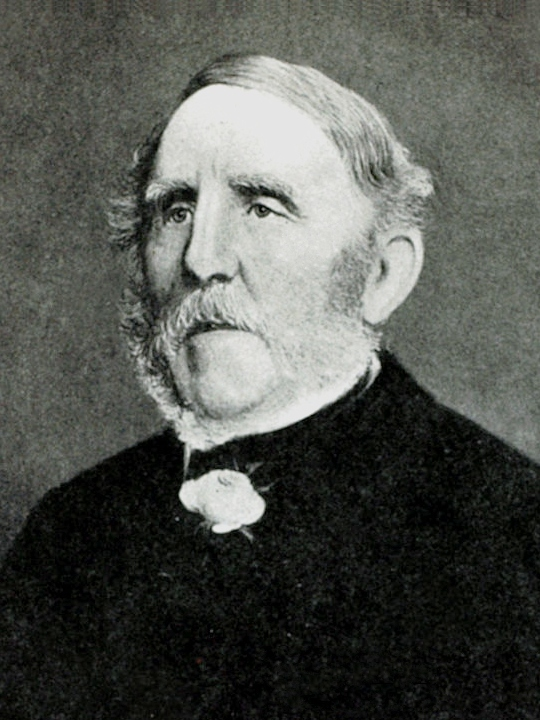

Personal information
- Full name: James Henry Dark
- Born: 14 May 1795; Marylebone, England
- Died: 17 October 1871 (aged 76); St John's Wood, England
- Batting: Right-handed
- Role: Batsman
- Relatives: Benjamin Dark (brother); Sydney Dark (brother)

Domestic team information
- Years: Team
- 1815–1826: Middlesex
- 1835–1843: Marylebone Cricket Club (MCC)

James Henry Dark (14 May 1795 – 17 October 1871) was an English professional cricketer who later became a noted patron of the sport, and was, from 1835 to 1864, the proprietor of Lord's Cricket Ground. He was the brother of Benjamin Dark.

== Career as player and umpire ==
Dark was born on 24 May 1795 at Marylebone, London. An occasional wicket-keeper, Dark was mainly associated with Middlesex and he made 17 known appearances from 1815 to 1843. In 1835, he represented the Players in the Gentlemen v Players match at Lord's. Dark was described as "a good hitter and fieldsman". He was a respected umpire who stood intermittently from 1829 to 1860.

== Proprietor of Lord's ==
Dark used his earnings from cricket to become a property owner and developer. When an opportunity arose to buy the leasehold at Lord's, Dark was quick to seize it.

The current Lord's Cricket Ground was opened by Thomas Lord in 1814, the ground sited on land that Lord leased from the Eyre Estate in St John's Wood. In 1825, Lord proposed building houses on the land as he was not receiving enough revenue from cricket. There was strong opposition to his idea and he sold his leasehold interest in the ground to William Ward for £5000.

In 1835, Ward sold the leasehold to Dark who paid £2000 upfront and an annuity of £425 to the Ward family through the unexpired term of the lease from Michaelmas Day 1835 for 59 years (to 1894). The rental due to the Eyre Estate was £150 per annum.

Dark lived close by the ground in a house which was "near the present (in 1945) members' luncheon room".

Dark did much to improve Lord's. When he took over, there were two ponds on the land which frequently filled up with rubble and the playing area had a very rough surface. The ponds were eventually drained and filled in while ground maintenance relied to a large extent on sheep to keep the grass down and a small roller to even out the surface. Dark's development programme was ambitious for it included extension and improvement of the pavilion and the installation of gas lighting. He added a billiard room, a real tennis court, a running track and planted 400 trees. He struggled to improve the notoriously bad pitch and some of his extra attractions, such as pony racing and Red Indian encampments, cannot have helped the condition of the outfield.

Dark brought his family into Lord's to help develop the business. His brother Ben established a bat-making business at the ground and their younger brother Robert sold a whole range of equipment including the new pads and gloves that players were beginning to prefer to Muscular Christianity.

In 1860, there was a potential crisis at Lord's when the Eyre Estate decided to sell the freehold at public auction. Dark was among many who urged MCC to bid but, for any number of reasons including a lack of vision, they did not and the ground was bought by Isaac Moses, a property speculator, for £7000. Dark resigned the leasehold in 1864 and it was taken over by MCC. In 1866, using funds advanced by William Nicholson, MCC did buy the freehold from Moses for £18,333 6s 8d, which was not good business: they should have heeded James Dark.

== Character and personal life ==
The son of a saddler, Dark was connected with Lord's in some capacity for 59 years from 1805 to 1864 and it was said of him in Alfred D Taylor's Annals of Lord's and History of the MCC: "having, perhaps, done more for MCC than any other individual". During his period of proprietorship, the ground was often referred to in common parlance as Dark's.

Known as "the Boss", Dark was described as "a somewhat taciturn, silent man, out of who information was not easily extracted".

Dark died on 17 October 1871 at St John's Wood, London at the age of 76 and is buried in Kensal Green Cemetery where a red granite slab was erected with the inscription: "Sacred to the Memory of Mr James Henry Dark, who died October 17th 1871, aged 76. For many years Proprietor of Lord's Cricket Ground".

== Bibliography ==
- Carlaw, Derek (2020). Kent County Cricketers, A to Z: Part One (1806–1914) (PDF). Cardiff: ACS.
- Arthur Haygarth (1862) Scores & Biographies, Volumes 1–3 (1744–1846), Lillywhite
- Warner, Pelham (1946). Lords: 1787–1945. London: Harrap. OCLC 877106024.
- Media related to James Dark at Wikimedia Commons
