= Francis Fenner =

English cricketer

Personal information
- Born: 1 March 1811; Cambridge, England
- Died: 22 May 1896 (aged 85); Bath, Somerset, England
- Height: 5 ft 10 in (1.78 m)
- Batting: Right-handed
- Bowling: Right-arm fast
- Role: Bowler

Domestic team information
- Years: Team
- 1832–1855: Cambridge Town Club
- 1839: Cambridge University
- 1843–1855: Hampshire

Francis Phillips Fenner (1 March 1811 – 22 May 1896) was an English cricketer for Hampshire and other teams. A right-arm fast bowler, Fenner took 176 wickets from his 54 appearances from 1829 until 1856.

He established Fenner's cricket ground in Cambridge in 1848 on land which he had leased. The ground is still used by Cambridge University for their home fixtures.

== Early life ==
Fenner was born in Cambridge and baptised on 21 April 1811 at St. Andrew the Great's, son of Elizabeth (née Welch) and Joseph Fenner. He married Mary Williams Smith on 19 May 1836 at the church of the Holy Trinity, Cambridge. In adulthood he stood five feet ten inches tall and weighed 12 stone.

== Career ==
Fenner played from 1832 for his local town cricket club in Cambridge, and his county, in 1839 for Cambridge University, and made his debut for Hampshire in 1843. Fenner's career had not begun well with the bat, his average never reaching double figures through the first seasons of his pre-Hampshire career from 1829 until 1833. In 1834 he scored 72 runs from four matches at 12.00, and in 1837 he scored 58 in one match at 29.00 including one knock of 37. From 1840 until his debut for Hampshire he averaged 18.90, 16.66 with a career best of 80 and 15.28, however in his debut year for the county team this dropped until 8.62, and in his second season in 1844 he played in only one match, scoring 17.

He would only make a few appearances for the rest of his career never more than three matches in the season. His average did not peak above a season-high of 19.00 from 1844 until 1853. In 1854, however, he hit career best figures with the bat, playing one innings and scoring 62. While his career best individual score of 80 from 1834 remained unbroken, this knock gave him a career best season average of 62.00. This success did not continue, however, and his last seasons during 1855 and 1856 saw averages of 8.00 and 4.50 from only two matches.

It was with the ball that Fenner enjoyed more success. While he began his career as a bowler quietly, with only three wickets across his first two seasons, his bowling improved in 1834 with a return of 22 wickets. Returns of six and eight in the next two years were overshadowed by 14 wickets in 1838, and 11 wickets in 1840, 27 in 1841, 24 in 1843 and 17 in 1844. Single figure returns of seven, six, three and one followed, before a brief resurgence of 15 in 1849, however he was unable to take a wicket with the 48 deliveries of his final season in 1853.

== Later life ==
In 1851 Fenner was working as a tobacconist, living in Regent Street, Cambridge, with Mary and son Frank and daughters Emma, Frances, Ellen and Eliza. In the 1861 census he was aged 50 living with his wife Mary, son Frank and daughters, Emma, Frances, Ellen, Harriett and Jannette, in Emmanuel Street, Cambridge, his occupation given as "cigar merchant".

By 1871 aged 60 he had moved to Bath, Somerset, with his wife Mary, daughters Emma, Fanny, Ellen and Jeanette and his sister Elisa, and was described as a hotel proprietor. He was still a hotel proprietor in Bath St Peter and Paul in the 1881 census, living with Mary and daughters Emma and Frances, and his sister Eliza. In 1891 he was described as a hotel keeper living with Mary his wife and Frances his daughter.

He died in Bath, aged 85.
