= Daniel Hayward =

English cricketer

Daniel Hayward (1807 – 29 May 1852) was an English professional cricketer who played from 1832 to 1851. He was the father of Cambridge batsmen Thomas Hayward and Daniel Hayward junior; and the grandfather of Tom Hayward, the Surrey and England opener.

A right-handed batsman and wicket-keeper who was mainly associated with Cambridge Town Club, Hayward made 24 known appearances. He represented the Players in the Gentlemen v Players series and the North in the North v. South series.

He is buried in the Mill Road cemetery, Cambridge, as is his son Thomas Hayward.

== Bibliography ==
- Booth, Keith; Booth, Jennifer (2018). The Haywards: The Biography of a Cricket Dynasty. Chequered Flag Publishing. ISBN 9781999777425.
- Haygarth, Arthur (1996) [1862]. Scores & Biographies, Volume 1 (1744–1826). Kennington: Frederick Lillywhite. ISBN 978-19-00592-23-9.
- Haygarth, Arthur (1997) [1862]. Scores & Biographies, Volume 2 (1827–1840). Kennington: Frederick Lillywhite. ISBN 978-19-00592-23-9.
