= Cambridge Town Club =

Former English cricket club

Cambridge Town Club (CTC) was an English cricket club established in Cambridge before 1817. Among notable players who represented CTC were Tom Hayward Sr, Robert Carpenter, Alfred Diver, and George Tarrant. It co-existed with Cambridge University Cricket Club, an entirely separate entity, and the two teams played each other on numerous occasions.

== Nomenclature ==
As with similar leading town clubs, the CTC team was representative of the county of Cambridgeshire as a whole, and it ultimately evolved into the original Cambridgeshire County Cricket Club, but various team names were in use, and the town and county clubs were effectively the same thing, both of them folding by the end of the 1870s. The names used for matches were Cambridge Town Club (1817–1861), Cambridgeshire (1844–1871), Cambridge Union Club (1826–1833), Cambridge Townsmen (one match only in 1848), and the Cambridge Town and County Club (1844–1856). According to the Association of Cricket Statisticians and Historians (ACS), this nomenclature has created a scenario whereby "it is impossible to separate the Town Club from that of the County in major matches". (Note: Any match listed in the ACS' Important Match Guide (1981) is historically important, and therefore of the highest standard, whether or not a scorecard might exist. The same applies to numerous matches discovered by researchers since 1981. For further information, see First-class cricket.)

The modern Cambridgeshire county club, which plays in the Minor Counties Championship, was founded in 1891, and has no connection with the CTC.

== Bibliography ==
- ACS (1981). A Guide to Important Cricket Matches Played in the British Isles 1709–1863. Nottingham: ACS. OCLC 85045528.
- Birley, Derek (1999). A Social History of English Cricket. London: Aurum Press. ISBN 978-18-54107-10-7 – via Internet Archive.
- Wisden (1983). Woodcock, John (ed.). Wisden Cricketers' Almanack (120th ed.). London: Queen Anne Press. ISBN 978-0-3560-9381-9.
