= History of English cricket (1846–1863) =

History of cricket in England

In English cricket, the years 1846–1863 were the main period of the sport's "roundarm era". Although roundarm had been legalised amid great controversy, its timespan was relatively short. By 1863, there was an increasing demand for the legalisation of overarm bowling and this was achieved on 10 June 1864.

Taking advantage of the "railway boom", the professional travelling elevens began to tour the country, staging matches against local teams before large crowds. The first of these was the All England Eleven(the AEE), founded by William Clarke in 1846 and then managed by George Parr following Clarke's death. The rival United All England Eleven (the UEE) was established by Jemmy Dean and John Wisden in 1852. Travelling took on a global aspect when, for the first time, an international England team was formed to undertake the first overseas tours to North America in 1859 (this was, in fact, by a combined AEE/UEE team) and Australia in 1861–62.

In 1846 there were only four definitive county clubs. Sussex County Cricket Club was the oldest, having been founded in 1839. It had been followed by Nottinghamshire in 1841, Cambridgeshire in 1844 and Surrey in 1845. Kent County Cricket Club had a complex history with separate organisations founded in 1842 and 1859 – these merged to form the present Kent club in 1870. Yorkshire, Hampshire and Middlesex were all founded in 1863. (Note: Some eleven-a-side matches played from 1772 to 1863 have been rated "first-class" by certain sources. However, the term only came into common use around 1864, when overarm bowling was legalised. It was formally defined as a standard by a meeting at Lord's, in May 1894, of Marylebone Cricket Club (MCC) and the county clubs which were then competing in the County Championship. The ruling was effective from the beginning of the 1895 season, but pre-1895 matches of the same standard have no official definition of status because the ruling is not retrospective. Matches of a similar standard since the beginning of the 1864 season are generally considered to have an unofficial first-class status. Pre-1864 matches which are included in the ACS' "Important Match Guide" may generally be regarded as important or, at least, historically significant. For further information, see First-class cricket.)

== England Elevens ==
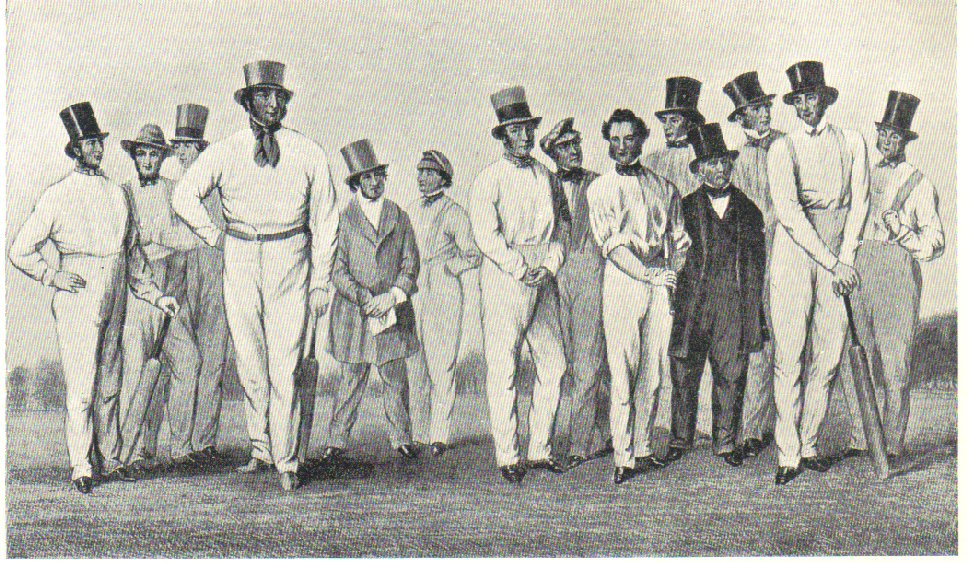
The All England Eleven in 1847. Left to right: Joe Guy, George Parr, Will Martingell, Alfred Mynn, William Denison, Jemmy Dean, William Clarke, Nicholas Felix, Oliver Pell, William Hillyer, William Lillywhite, William Dorrinton, Fuller Pilch and Tom Sewell.

Social conditions, especially the railways, were a key factor in the creation of the travelling All England Eleven (the AEE). The team was founded in Nottingham by William Clarke. Taking advantage of the railway boom, they travelled throughout Great Britain and were a significant factor in the spread of cricket. The first AEE match was against a Sheffield XX in September and they played others in Manchester and Leeds. The original AEE team was: William Clarke, Jemmy Dean, William Dorrinton, Fuller Pilch, Alfred Mynn, Joe Guy, Will Martingell, Tom Sewell, George Butler, Villiers Smith and William Hillyer. Other players who represented the AEE in its early days included George Parr, William Lillywhite, Nicholas Felix, William Denison, Thomas Box and Oliver Pell.

In 1852, the United All England Eleven (the UEE) was established as a rival to the AEE. Jemmy Dean and John Wisden were the main organisers and other players to represent the UEE in its early years included John Lillywhite, Tom Lockyer, Jem Grundy, F. P. Miller, Will Mortlock and Tom Sherman.

In 1857, the AEE and UEE began an annual series of matches against each other that continued until 1869. The fixture was the most important of the season while it lasted. Two games were played in 1857, both at Lord's and both won by the AEE whose players in 1857 included George Parr (captain), Alfred Diver, H. H. Stephenson, Julius Caesar, Cris Tinley, George Anderson, Ned Willsher and John Jackson. UEE players in 1857 included: John Wisden (captain), Jemmy Dean, Jem Grundy, William Caffyn, John Lillywhite, Tom Lockyer, Will Mortlock and Will Martingell. Also in 1857, the Cricketers Fund Friendly Society was instituted and, for ten years, the great match between the AEE and the UEE was played in its support.

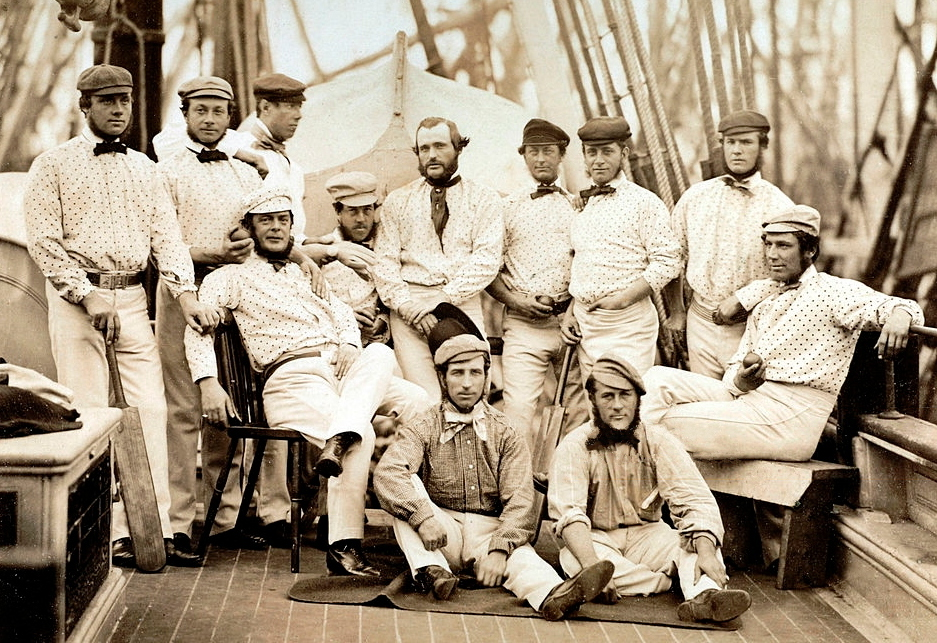
The first English touring team pictured on board ship at Liverpool: standing at left Robert Carpenter, William Caffyn, Tom Lockyer; middle row John Wisden, H. H. Stephenson, George Parr, Jem Grundy, Julius Caesar, Thomas Hayward, John Jackson; front row Alfred Diver, John Lillywhite.

On 7 September 1859, the departure of cricket's first-ever touring team. A photograph was taken on board ship before they sailed from Liverpool. The team of English professionals went to North America and played five matches, winning them all. There were no important fixtures. The 12-man squad was: George Parr (captain), James Grundy, John Jackson (all of Nottinghamshire); Robert Carpenter, Alfred Diver, Thomas Hayward (all of Cambridgeshire); Julius Caesar, William Caffyn, Tom Lockyer, H. H. Stephenson (all of Surrey); John Lillywhite, John Wisden (both of Sussex).

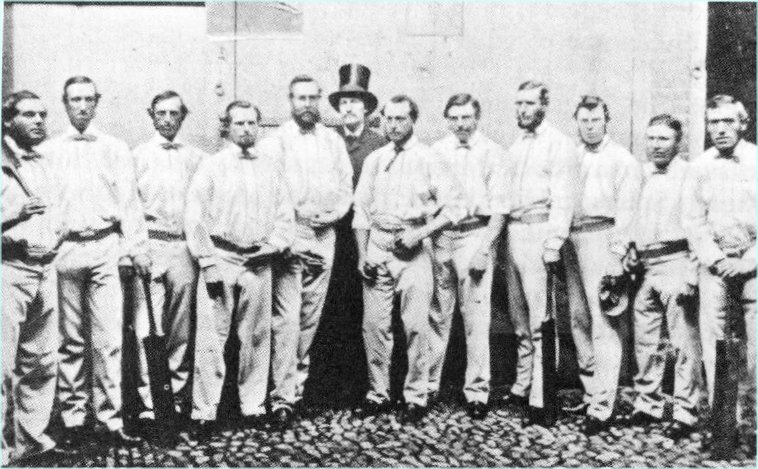
The English team of 1861–62 just prior to their departure for Australia: left to right Will Mortlock, William Mudie, George Bennett, Charles Lawrence, H. H. Stephenson, W. B. Mallam (organiser), William Caffyn, George Griffith, Tom Hearne, Roger Iddison, Tom Sewell, Ned Stephenson. Not in photo: George Wells.

H. H. Stephenson (Surrey) captained the first English team to tour Australia. The other players were William Caffyn, Will Mortlock, George Griffith, William Mudie, Tom Sewell Jr (all Surrey); Roger Iddison, Ned Stephenson (both Yorkshire); Tom Hearne, Charles Lawrence (both Middlesex); George Wells (Sussex); and George Bennett (Kent). H. H. Stephenson and Caffyn had toured America in 1859. They were abroad from October 1861 until May 1862. One important match was played and twelve, mostly against odds of at least 18 to 11, that were non-important.

== Matches, venues and teams ==
According to the Association of Cricket Statisticians and Historians (the ACS), a total of 534 important matches were played in the eighteen English seasons from 1846 to 1863 inclusive. Marylebone Cricket Club (MCC) were especially prolific. There was no national championship and the matches were all arranged on an ad hoc basis, although some such as Gentlemen v Players and North v South had become traditional events in the cricketing calendar. As a rule, these matches were eleven-a-side with double innings and usually played over three days.

Having begun in 1827, the University Match between Cambridge University Cricket Club (CUCC) and Oxford University Cricket Club (OUCC) had become an annual event by 1846 and it was played every year from then to 1863.

Kent had a strong team in the 1840s which included Nicholas Felix, William Hillyer, Alfred Mynn and Fuller Pilch.

On 23, 24 & 25 July 1849, Sheffield Cricket Club and Manchester Cricket Club met at Hyde Park in Sheffield. For the first time, the match was billed as "Yorkshire v Lancashire" and it is recognised as the first Roses Match. Yorkshire won by 5 wickets.

Middlesex re-emerged as a county team in 1850, largely through the efforts of the Walker family that eventually founded the present Middlesex County Cricket Club.

On 1 March 1859, the second Kent county club was formed and based at Maidstone. This club was commonly called West Kent while the existing Canterbury one, formed in 1842, was known as East Kent, a scenario which reflected the Dorset/Mann teams of the 18th century. The two organisations eventually merged in 1870 to form the existing Kent County Cricket Club.

Three county clubs were founded in 1863. On 8 January, Yorkshire County Cricket Club was founded out of the Sheffield Match Fund Committee that had been established on 7 March 1861. This was an exact parallel with the formation of Sussex County Cricket Club from a similar fund (1836–1839). Yorkshire played their inaugural match against Surrey at The Oval on 4, 5 & 6 June. It was a rain-affected draw, evenly balanced. Hampshire County Cricket Club was founded on 12 August. A number of previous county organisations including the famous Hambledon Club had existed in Hampshire for over a century, but none had survived indefinitely. On 15 December, Middlesex County Cricket Club was founded at a meeting in the London Tavern.

Besides MCC, CUCC, OUCC and the new county clubs, other significant teams represented Manchester Cricket Club, Nottingham Cricket Club and Sheffield Cricket Club. There was an increase in northern matches with the three main town clubs regularly challenging each other.

New grounds in the period included Bramall Lane, which superseded Hyde Park in Sheffield; Old Trafford in Manchester; and Fenner's in Cambridge. Elsewhere, Lord's remained the sport's feature venue and there was increasing usage of the Magdalen Ground in Oxford; Trent Bridge in Nottingham; and The Oval in south London. The first important match at The Oval was Surrey Club v MCC on 25 & 26 May 1846. Only 194 runs were scored in the match with a top score of 13. William Hillyer took 14 wickets to help MCC win by 48 runs. Surrey County Cricket Club played its first match against Kent at The Oval on 25 & 26 June 1846, winning by 10 wickets.

== Gentlemen v Players ==
Between 1846 and 1863, a total of 26 Gentlemen v Players matches were played. Until 1856, the match was played at Lord's at least once a season. It was contested twice a season from 1857 to 1863, once at Lord's and once at The Oval. The Players won 21 of the 26 matches, the Gentlemen won four, and one match was tied.

== North v South ==
Before 1846, North v South had only been played four times, the last time in 1838. The competition was revived in 1849 and was contested at least once per season until 1863, for a total of 28 encounters. It was frequently contested twice a year, with three matches in each years 1857 and 1863. The North won 16 of the 28 matches, the South won 8, and the remaining four were drawn.

== Notable cricketers ==
W. G. Grace was born on 18 July 1848 at Downend, near Bristol.

At Lord's, Alfred Baillie succeeded Roger Kynaston as MCC secretary in 1858 and Robert Allan Fitzgerald succeeded Baillie, who resigned due to ill health in 1863.

Active players, administrators and other contributors of the period included:

- George Anderson
- George Bennett
- Thomas Box
- George Butler
- Julius Caesar
- William Caffyn
- Robert Carpenter
- George Chatterton
- William Clarke
- Jemmy Dean
- William Denison
- Alfred Diver
- William Dorrinton
- Nicholas Felix
- George Griffith
- James Grundy
- Joe Guy
- Arthur Haygarth
- Thomas Hayward
- Tom Hearne
- William Hillyer
- Roger Iddison
- John Jackson
- Charles Lawrence
- John Lillywhite
- William Lillywhite
- Tom Lockyer
- Will Martingell
- F. P. Miller
- Will Mortlock
- William Mudie
- Alfred Mynn
- George Parr
- Oliver Pell
- Fuller Pilch
- Tom Sewell Sr
- Tom Sewell Jr
- John Sherman
- H. H. Stephenson
- Ned Stephenson
- George Tarrant
- Cris Tinley
- V. E. Walker
- George Wells
- Ned Wenman
- Ned Willsher
- John Wisden
- George Wootton

== Achievements ==
In a match played 27–29 May 1847 between MCC and Oxford University, William Hillyer completed the first recorded "match double" of 100 runs and ten wickets in an important match, scoring 26 and 83 and taking thirteen wickets. The feat was not accomplished again until 1859 by V. E. Walker. Since then, it has been accomplished numerous times, most frequently by W. G. Grace.

In 1850, John Wisden bowled all ten batsmen in one innings, playing for North v South at Lord's.

On 27 July 1852, John Sherman made his final important appearance for Manchester v. Sheffield at Hyde Park, Sheffield. His career had spanned 44 seasons from his debut at Lord's on 20 September 1809 when he played for Beauclerk's XI v. Ladbroke's XI. His was the longest career span, equalled only by W. G. Grace.

On 21, 22 & 23 July 1859, V. E. Walker of Middlesex, playing for England v. Surrey at The Oval, took all ten wickets in the Surrey first innings and followed by scoring 108 in the England second innings, having been the not out batsman in the first (20*). He took a further four wickets in Surrey's second innings. England won by 392 runs.

== Rules and equipment history ==
In 1846, Lord's introduced the Telegraph Score Board, and scorecards were sold for the first time. The first mowing machinery were employed on cricket fields around 1850, but sheep were still utilized at Lord's for many years after that. The simple wicket-keeping gloves gave way to the now-famous cushioned gauntlets. The follow-on differential was lowered to 80 in 1854. (60 in a one-day match).

Jem Grundy became the first player to be given out handled the ball when playing for MCC v Kent at Lord's in 1857.

In 1859, the earliest reference has been found of a hat being presented to a bowler who had taken wickets with three successive deliveries, hence hat-trick.

On 26 August 1862, Surrey played against an England Eleven at The Oval. Edgar Willsher of England was no-balled six times in succession by John Lillywhite (son of William Lillywhite) for bowling with his hand above the shoulder. For some years previously, Willsher and others had bowled in this way and the incident at The Oval put the issue into context. The drama was exaggerated when Willsher and the other eight England professionals walked off the field. Play continued next day but with a replacement umpire. Relative to the introduction of roundarm, this controversy was short-lived and overarm bowling was legalised in 1864.

== MCC and Lord's ==
Lord's hosted the last Public Schools Weeks (Eton, Harrow, and Winchester) in 1854.

Alfred Baillie replaced Roger Kynaston as MCC Secretary in 1858. Kynaston has been in charge since 1842. Robert Allan Fitzgerald replaced Baillie, who resigned due to illness, in 1863. Fitzgerald became the first paid secretary on January 1, 1867, and held the position until 1876.

The Eyre Estate sold the freehold of Lord's to Isaac Moses, a property trader, at public auction in 1860 for £7,000. MCC did not submit a bid. James Dark held the leasehold until 1864, when he ceded it to MCC, who afterwards purchased the freehold from Mr Moses at a substantial profit.

== Single wicket ==
In 1846, the last match played for the Single Wicket Championship was between Alfred Mynn and Nicholas Felix.

The last major single wicket event was held in 1848.

== Literature ==
Publication in 1862 of volumes 1–4 of Scores and Biographies, compiled by Arthur Haygarth. This work recorded the full scores of all discoverable matches from 1744 onwards.

== See also ==
- History of English cricket (1826–1845)

== Bibliography ==
- ACS (1981). A Guide to Important Cricket Matches Played in the British Isles 1709–1863. Nottingham: ACS. OCLC 85045528.
- ACS (1982). A Guide to First-class Cricket Matches Played in the British Isles. Nottingham: ACS. OCLC 10586869.
- Frindall, Bill, ed. (1998). The Wisden Book of Cricket Records (Fourth ed.). Alton, Hampshire: John Wisden & Co. Ltd. ISBN 978-07-47222-03-3.
