= List of Players cricketers (1841–1962) =

This is a complete list of cricketers who represented the Players in matches from 1806 to 1962. The majority of matches were the annual Gentlemen v Players fixtures but Players teams also competed against international touring teams on occasion and the cricketers who represented the Players in those matches are included in the list. The cricketers are listed alphabetically but some of the names are still redlinks. The dates are the span of years in which the cricketer made appearances in Players teams.

For cricketers who appeared for the Players only prior to 1841, see List of Players cricketers (1806–1840).

== A ==
- Bobby Abel (1886–1902)
- Tom Adams (1838–1854)
- David Allen (1960)
- Michael Allen (1961)
- Bill Alley (1961)
- Les Ames (1928–1947)
- George Anderson (1855–1864)
- Keith Andrew (1962)
- Bob Appleyard (1954)
- Ted Arnold (1899–1908)
- Johnny Arnold (1931–1935)
- Bill Ashdown (1933)
- Ewart Astill (1923–1928)
- Graham Atkinson (1961)
- George Atkinson (1863)
- William Attewell (1885–1898)

== B ==
- Harry Bagshaw (1899)
- Jim Bailey (1932)
- George Baker (1894–1898)
- Fred Bakewell (1931)
- Harry Baldwin (1895)
- Wilf Barber (1935)
- Gordon Barker (1956)
- Thomas Barker (1834–1845)
- Dick Barlow (1876–1886)
- Sydney Barnes (1902–1914)
- Billy Barnes (1879–1893)
- Charlie Barnett (1933–1947)
- Ted Barratt (1877–1878)
- Fred Barratt (1928–1929)
- Des Barrick (1953)
- Ken Barrington (1955–1962)
- Victor Barton (1901)
- Leonard Bates (1925)
- Billy Bates (1880–1887)
- George Bean (1891–1893)
- Alec Bedser (1947–1955)
- Eric Bedser (1954–1955)
- Frederick Bell (1857–1862)
- George Bennett (1865–1866)
- Billy Bestwick (1919)
- John Bickley (1853–1855)
- Samuel Biddulph (1862)
- Thomas Bignall (1863–1873)
- Emmanuel Blamires (1878)
- Colin Blythe (1909–1913)
- Jack Board (1896–1910)
- Major Booth (1913)
- Bill Bowes (1931–1939)
- Ted Bowley (1925–1930)
- Frederick Bowley (1904–1914)
- Thomas Box (1834–1853)
- Stuart Boyes (1928–1931)
- Charles Brampton (1859)
- Len Braund (1901–1907)
- Johnny Briggs (1884–1896)
- Bill Brockwell (1894–1902)
- Dennis Brookes (1947–1959)
- Ted Brooks (1931–1935)
- George Brown (Hants) (1919–1930)
- Jack Brown (1896–1903)
- Claude Buckenham (1907–1913)
- Edward Bushby (1844–1845)
- George Butler (1843–1846)
- Harold Butler (1947)
- Harry Butt (1894)

== C ==
- Samuel Cadman (1908–1923)
- Julius Caesar (1856–1863)
- William Caffyn (1850–1863)
- Herbert Carpenter (1896–1902)
- Robert Carpenter (1859–1873)
- Tom Cartwright (1959)
- James Challen junior (1854)
- Henry Charlwood (1868–1881)
- George Chatterton (1850–1855)
- James Chatterton (1862)
- William Chatterton (1889–1898)
- James Chester (1849–1850)
- Nobby Clark (1926–1933)
- Tom Clark (1957)
- William Clarke (1846–1853)
- Francis Clifford (1854)
- Brian Close (1949–1962)
- James Cobbett (1832–1841)
- Samuel Coe (1908)
- Denis Compton (1937–1957)
- Lawrence Cook (1921)
- Bill Copson (1936–1939)
- Tich Cornford (1925)
- Cornelius Coward (1867–1868)
- Beaumont Cranfield (1902)
- Jack Crapp (1948)
- Len Creese (1935)
- Alfred Croom (1930–1931)
- Brian Crump (1961)
- Willis Cuttell (1898)

== D ==
- Ces Dacre (1928–1934)
- Richard Daft (1860–1879)
- Samuel Dakin (1851)
- George Davidson (1893–1898)
- Dai Davies (1928)
- George Dawkes (1951–1955)
- Daniel Day (1850)
- Harry Dean (1910–1912)
- Jemmy Dean (1843–1857)
- George Dennett (1905)
- David Denton (1901–1919)
- Jack Devey (1902)
- Alfred Dipper (1926)
- James Disney (1886)
- Alfred Diver (1858–1860)
- Edwin Diver (1886–1899)
- Tom Dollery (1939–1955)
- Arthur Dolphin (1911–1923)
- Bruce Dooland (1953–1954)
- William Dorrinton (1844–1846)
- Andy Ducat (1921–1929)
- Dick Duckfield (1934)
- George Duckworth (1924–1935)
- Jack Durston (1921–1932)

== E ==
- David Eastwood (1877)
- John Edrich (1959–1962)
- Bill Edrich (1938)
- Frank Edwards (1925)
- Charles Ellis (1863)
- George Emmett (1953)
- Tom Emmett (1869–1885)
- Godfrey Evans (1946–1959)

== F ==
- Colin Fairservice (1931)
- Frank Farrands (1870)
- Francis Fenner (1840–1842)
- Frank Field (1911)
- Arthur Fielder (1906–1910)
- Richard Fillery (1862–1873)
- Laurie Fishlock (1936–1947)
- Thomas Flavel (1822–1827)
- Jack Flavell (1961)
- David Fletcher (1947–1952)
- Wilfred Flowers (1878–1894)
- Arnold Fothergill (1882)
- Tich Freeman (1921–1936)
- George Freeman (1871)

== G ==
- Bob Gale (1957–1962)
- Fred Gardner (1957)
- George Gaukrodger (1902)
- George Geary (1925–1934)
- Harold Gibbons (1928)
- Norman Gifford (1962)
- Harold Gimblett (1936–1950)
- Cliff Gladwin (1947)
- Tom Goddard (1929–1938)
- Bartholomew Good (1835–1842)
- Alf Gover (1934–1936)
- Tom Graveney (1949–1962)
- Laurie Gray (1946)
- Andrew Greenwood (1873–1876)
- Luke Greenwood (1865–1866)
- Bob Gregory (1932–1934)
- George Griffith (1860–1870)
- Irwin Grimshaw (1884)
- James Grundy (1851–1868)
- George Gunn (1908–1928)
- John Gunn (1900–1913)
- William Gunn (1881–1898)
- Joe Guy (1838–1852)

== H ==
- Schofield Haigh (1898–1910)
- Louis Hall (1883–1885)
- Albert Hallam (1907–1908)
- Maurice Hallam (1956–1961)
- Charlie Hallows (1921–1927)
- Arnold Hamer (1954)
- Charles Hammond (1845)
- Wally Hammond (1923–1937)
- Wally Hardinge (1911–1924)
- Joe Hardstaff junior (1935–1947)
- Joe Hardstaff senior (1906–1910)
- Sam Hargreave (1902–1904)
- George Harrison (1883)
- Leo Harrison (1955)
- Charles Hawkins (1840–1843)
- Ernie Hayes (1903–1914)
- Thomas Hayward (1860–1871)
- Tom Hayward (1895–1911)
- Alec Hearne (1893–1898)
- Frank Hearne (1886)
- George Gibbons Hearne (1878–1884)
- J. T. Hearne (1893–1904)
- J. W. Hearne (1912–1932)
- Thomas Hearne (1862–1869)
- Robert Henderson (1892)
- Patsy Hendren (1919–1934)
- Lofty Herman (1932)
- William Hickton (1867)
- Jesse Hide (1884)
- Allen Hill (1874–1882)
- Norman Hill (1961)
- William Hillyer (1838–1851)
- Malcolm Hilton (1951)
- George Hirst (1897–1921)
- Bill Hitch (1912–1923)
- Jack Hobbs (1907–1934)
- Isaac Hodgson (1863)
- James Hodson (1845)
- Fred Holland (1904)
- Eric Hollies (1946–1957)
- Percy Holmes (1919–1931)
- Norman Horner (1962)
- Henry Horton (1960)
- Martin Horton (1959)
- Harry Howell (1920–1925)
- George Howitt (1866)
- Dick Howorth (1947)
- Fred Huish (1902)
- Richard Humphrey (1872–1874)
- Thomas Humphrey (1863–1870)
- Punter Humphreys (1909–1914)
- Walter Humphreys senior (1884)
- Joe Humphries (1908)
- Tom Hunt (1850)
- David Hunter (1890–1909)
- Joe Hunter (1884–1885)
- Jim Hutchinson (1924)
- Len Hutton (1937–1953)

== I ==
- Roger Iddison (1862–1864)
- Jack Iddon (1931)
- Jack Ikin (1946–1951)
- Ray Illingworth (1955–1959)
- James Iremonger (1902–1911)

== J ==
- Les Jackson (1949–1960)
- John Jackson (1857–1864)
- Thomas Jayes (1906–1910)
- Percy Jeeves (1914)
- Roly Jenkins (1949)
- Harry Jupp (1863–1882)

== K ==
- Walter Keeton (1932–1936)
- Alec Kennedy (1914–1934)
- Don Kenyon (1950–1955)
- Ernest Killick (1901–1902)
- Norman Kilner (1924–1928)
- Roy Kilner (1919–1926)
- John King (1904–1909)
- Septimus Kinneir (1909–1911)
- Albert Knight (1903–1905)
- Barry Knight (1960–1962)

== L ==
- Jim Laker (1952–1957)
- James Langridge (1930–1937)
- John Langridge (1933–1949)
- David Larter (1961)
- Harold Larwood (1927–1932)
- Frederick Lee (1886–1889)
- Harry Lee (1928)
- Jack Lee (1934)
- Walter Lees (1904–1906)
- Maurice Leyland (1928–1938)
- Albert Lightfoot (1962)
- Dick Lilley (1895–1909)
- William Lillywhite (1831–1849)
- James Lillywhite (1862–1878)
- John Lillywhite (1851–1863)
- Walter Livsey (1922–1928)
- Charlie Llewellyn (1902)
- Peter Loader (1954)
- Tony Lock (1954–1962)
- Ephraim Lockwood (1869–1883)
- Bill Lockwood (1892–1902)
- Tom Lockyer (1854–1866)
- George Lohmann (1886–1896)
- Frank Lowson (1953–1954)

== M ==
- George Macaulay (1922–1925)
- Neil McCorkell (1932–1936)
- Ted McDonald (1924)
- Martin McIntyre (1871–1875)
- William McIntyre (1878)
- Thomas Mantle (1868)
- Francis Marlow (1895–1898)
- Roy Marshall (1958–1960)
- Frederick Martin (1891–1897)
- Will Martingell (1844–1858)
- Joseph Mayer (1931)
- Phil Mead (1911–1928)
- Walter Mead (1896–1901)
- Jack Mercer (1926–1934)
- Billy Midwinter (1878–1882)
- Geoff Millman (1961–1962)
- Percy Mills (1924)
- Joseph Milner (1961)
- Arthur Milton (1958)
- Arthur Mitchell (1934)
- Tommy Mitchell (1931–1934)
- Arthur Mold (1893–1895)
- Derek Morgan (1958–1962)
- Fred Morley (1874–1882)
- Will Mortlock (1854–1868)
- Alan Moss (1953–1961)
- Len Muncer (1948)
- Victor Munden (1955–1956)
- John Murdin (1922)
- John Murray (1959–1961)
- William Mycroft (1877–1880)
- Hubert Myers (1906–1908)

== N ==
- Jack Newman (1922–1928)
- John Newstead (1908–1909)
- Maurice Nichol (1931)
- Stan Nichols (1930–1938)
- Thomas Nixon (1851–1853)

== O ==
- Alan Oakman (1956)
- Thomas Oates (1907)
- Jack O'Connor (1934)
- William Oscroft (1871–1880)

== P ==
- Doug Padgett (1959–1960)
- George Paine (1934)
- Peter Parfitt (1962)
- Charlie Parker (1924–1926)
- Gilbert Parkhouse (1950–1959)
- Cec Parkin (1919–1923)
- Harry Parks (1933)
- Jim Parks senior (1935–1936)
- Jim Parks junior (1954–1958)
- George Parr (1846–1865)
- Jack Parsons (1914–1928)
- Alfred Payne (1881)
- Eddie Paynter (1931–1939)
- Alan Peach (1923–1928)
- Frederick Pearson (1911–1924)
- Ted Peate (1881–1886)
- Bobby Peel (1887–1897)
- Reg Perks (1931–1949)
- Henry Phillips (1871–1891)
- James Phillips (1878)
- George Picknell (1845)
- Fuller Pilch (1827–1849)
- William Pilch (1846–1848)
- Dick Pilling (1879–1884)
- George Pinder (1873–1877)
- Thomas Plumb (1869)
- Dick Pollard (1938–1947)
- Ted Pooley (1863–1879)
- George Pope (1939)
- Dick Pougher (1886–1896)
- Joseph Preston (1888)
- Ken Preston (1951)
- Walter Price (1870)
- Fred Price (1938–1939)
- Tom Pritchard (1948–1951)
- Geoff Pullar (1959)

== Q ==
- Walter Quaife (1889–1895)
- Willie Quaife (1897–1913)

== R ==
- John Rawlin (1892–1896)
- Maurice Read (1882–1895)
- Sam Redgate (1836–1843)
- Albert Relf (1902–1913)
- Robert Relf (1925)
- Brian Reynolds (1957–1958)
- Harold Rhodes (1959–1960)
- Wilfred Rhodes (1898–1927)
- Dick Richardson (1957–1958)
- Henry Richardson (1889)
- Peter Richardson (1959)
- Tom Richardson (1893–1903)
- James Ricketts (1867–1868)
- William Rigley (1878)
- Jack Robertson (1947–1952)
- Ellis Robinson (1946)
- Tom Robinson (1862)
- Walter Robinson (1881–1883)
- Fred Root (1924–1928)
- Joseph Rowbotham (1864–1869)
- Henry Royston (1855)
- Tom Rushby (1911)
- C. A. G. Russell (1920–1922)
- Eric Russell (1960–1961)
- Arnold Rylott (1874)

== S ==
- Peter Sainsbury (1958–1960)
- Henry Sampson (1841)
- Andy Sandham (1921–1934)
- John Savage (1958–1961)
- William Scotton (1880–1886)
- John Selby (1875–1882)
- Tom Sewell senior (1839–1847)
- Tom Sewell junior (1862–1864)
- James Seymour (1913–1924)
- Derek Shackleton (1950–1962)
- Frank Shacklock (1889)
- Jack Sharp (1907–1911)
- John Sharpe (1891)
- Phil Sharpe (1962)
- Alfred Shaw (1865–1882)
- Jem Shaw (1871–1874)
- Don Shepherd (1952–1957)
- Tom Shepherd (1922–1928)
- Mordecai Sherwin (1882–1893)
- Alan Shipman (1928)
- Arthur Shrewsbury (1876–1898)
- Frank Sibbles (1927)
- Tom Sidwell (1929)
- Frank Silcock (1868–1874)
- Jim Sims (1935)
- Reg Sinfield (1936)
- Frank Smailes (1938)
- Cyril Smart (1935)
- Jim Smith (1934–1937)
- Denis Smith (1931–1935)
- Donald Smith (1956–1958)
- Tiger Smith (1911–1928)
- Geoff Smith (1961)
- Harry Smith (1923–1924)
- John Smith (Cambs) (1865–1872)
- Ray Smith (1952–1953)
- Peter Smith (1938)
- Razor Smith (1910–1911)
- Edmund Sopp (1845)
- James Southerton (1868–1877)
- Stan Squires (1934)
- Arthur Staples (1929)
- Sam Staples (1923)
- Brian Statham (1951–1960)
- H. H. Stephenson (1857–1869)
- Micky Stewart (1960–1962)
- Bill Storer (1893–1901)
- Bert Strudwick (1903–1926)
- Frank Sugg (1888–1896)
- Dennis Sullivan (1928)
- George Summers (1867–1869)
- Herbert Sutcliffe (1923–1938)
- Roy Swetman (1960)

== T ==
- Frank Tarrant (1903–1914)
- George Tarrant (1862–1864)
- Fred Tate (1902)
- Maurice Tate (1923–1934)
- Roy Tattersall (1950–1953)
- Brian Taylor (1957)
- John Thewlis senior (1868)
- Albert Thomas (1928–1930)
- George Thompson (1900–1911)
- Cris Tinley (1858–1864)
- Fred Titmus (1955–1962)
- Leslie Todd (1936)
- Maurice Tompkin (1951–1955)
- Leslie Townsend (1928–1934)
- George Tribe (1958)
- Albert Trott (1899–1908)
- Fred Trueman (1955–1962)
- John Tunnicliffe (1897–1906)
- Ernest Tyldesley (1922–1928)
- Johnny Tyldesley (1898–1919)
- Dick Tyldesley (1925)
- Ted Tyler (1893)
- Frank Tyson (1955–1957)

== U ==
- George Ulyett (1875–1892)

== V ==
- Hedley Verity (1931–1936)
- Joe Vine (1901–1903)
- Bill Voce (1932)

== W ==
- Abe Waddington (1920–1925)
- Ted Wainwright (1890–1897)
- Peter Walker (1962)
- Jack Walsh (1947–1952)
- Albert Ward (1889–1900)
- Johnny Wardle (1948–1958)
- Arnold Warren (1905)
- Cyril Washbrook (1946–1956)
- Irving Washington (1902)
- Thomas Wass (1904–1908)
- Allan Watkins (1952)
- Alexander Watson (1877–1878)
- Frank Watson (1933)
- Willie Watson (1951–1961)
- Alan Watt (1933)
- Arthur Wellard (1931–1938)
- Ned Wenman (1829–1846)
- Albert Wensley (1928–1935)
- Alan Wharton (1956)
- John Wheeler (1878)
- John Whewell (1924)
- Harry Whitehead (1907)
- William Whysall (1923–1929)
- Edgar Willsher (1856–1873)
- Vic Wilson (1951–1958)
- John Wisden (1845–1859)
- Arthur Wood (1938)
- Henry Wood (1888–1892)
- Claud Woolley (1922)
- Frank Woolley (1909–1938)
- George Wootton (1862–1870)
- Stan Worthington (1928–1932)
- Harry Wrathall (1896–1901)
- Doug Wright (1939–1950)
- Henry Wright (1856)
- Walter Wright (1888–1889)
- Frederick Wyld (1873–1877)

== Y ==
- Tom Young (1925–1928)
- Sailor Young (1899–1900)

== See also ==
- List of Gentlemen v Players matches
- List of Players cricketers (1806–1840)
- List of Gentlemen cricketers (1806–1840)
- List of Gentlemen cricketers (1841–1962)
