= 1847 English cricket season =

Cricket season review

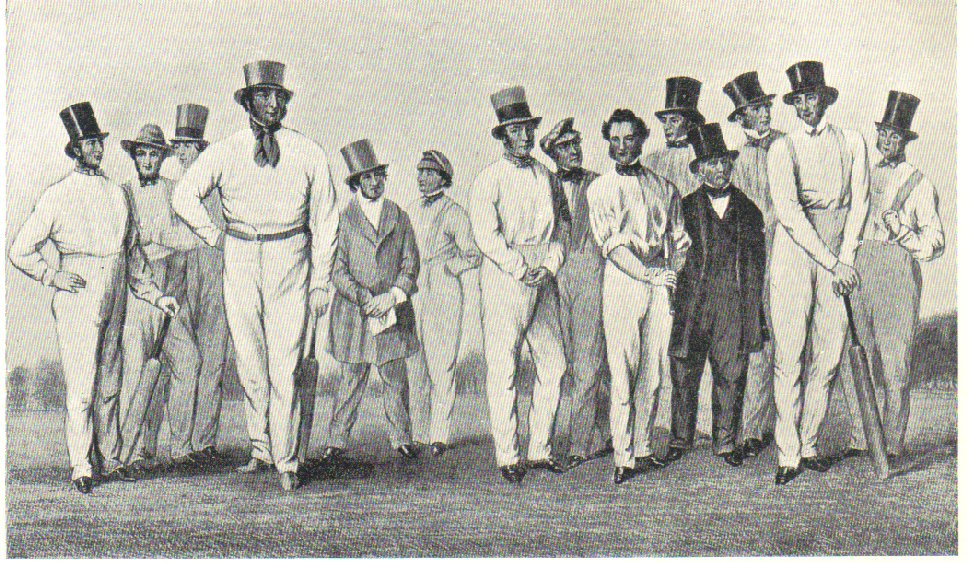
The England in 1847. Left to right: Joe Guy, George Parr, Will Martingell, Alfred Mynn, William Denison, Jemmy Dean, William Clarke, Nicholas Felix, Oliver Pell, William Hillyer, William Lillywhite, William Dorrinton, Fuller Pilch and Tom Sewell.

The 1847 English cricket season was the 21st of the roundarm era. (Note: Any match listed in the ACS' Important Match Guide (1981) is historically important, and therefore of the highest standard, whether or not a scorecard might exist. The same applies to numerous matches discovered by researchers since 1981. For further information, see First-class cricket.) Kent had a strong team including Nicholas Felix, William Hillyer, Alfred Mynn and Fuller Pilch. A noted highlight was the first recorded "match double" in an historically important match.

== Important matches ==
- 1847 match list

== Events ==
- 27 to 29 May: In the game between Marylebone Cricket Club (MCC) and Oxford University, William Hillyer completed the first recorded "match double" of 100 runs and ten wickets in a game, scoring 26 and 83, and taking thirteen wickets. The feat was not accomplished again until 1859 when Edward Walker achieved it, but since then has been accomplished numerous times, most frequently by W. G. Grace.

== Leading batsmen ==
N Felix was the leading runscorer with 591 @ 28.14

Other leading batsmen were: F Pilch, OC Pell, J Dean, A Haygarth, A Mynn, W Clarke, WR Hillyer, T Box

== Leading bowlers ==
WR Hillyer was the leading wicket-taker with 134

Other leading bowlers were: A Mynn, FW Lillywhite, J Dean, W Clarke, J Wisden, JM Lee, C Arnold

== Bibliography ==
- ACS (1981). A Guide to Important Cricket Matches Played in the British Isles 1709–1863. Nottingham: ACS. OCLC 85045528.
- Warner, Pelham (1946). Lords: 1787–1945. London: Harrap. OCLC 877106024.
