= Rest of England cricket teams =

Historical English cricket team

In English cricket since the first half of the 18th century, various ad hoc teams have been formed for short-term purposes which have been called England (i.e., in the sense of "the rest of England") to play against, say, Marylebone Cricket Club (MCC) or an individual county team. The key factor is that they were non-international and there is a significant difference between them and the official England cricket team which takes part in international fixtures. Conceptually, there is evidence of this sort of team being formed, or at least mooted, since the 1730s. They have always been "occasional elevens" but, nevertheless, have invariably been strong sides. A typical example would be a selection consisting of leading players drawn from several county teams.

== Origin of the name ==
The earliest known mention of the concept occurs in a report by the London Evening Post of 7 to 9 September 1734 which states that the London Cricket Club, being "desirous of playing one more match before the season is expired, do challenge to play with any eleven men in England". The challenge excluded members of Croydon Cricket Club, with whom London were in dispute. It is possible that challenges of this sort had been issued previously but no records of them have been found. There had been matches involving, for example, a team representing one county against a team bearing a patron's name and it is possible that teams of the latter type included players from a wide geographical area. In the 1730s, "any eleven men in England" would in practice have come from the southeastern counties only: e.g., Berkshire, Essex, Hampshire, Kent, Middlesex, Surrey, Sussex.

The majority of such teams were simply labelled "England", sometimes used loosely in a generic sense but, strictly speaking, the teams represented "the rest of England". The term per se was first used in reports of two Kent v England matches in 1739. The first was at Bromley Common on Monday, 9 July, and billed as "eleven gentlemen of that county (i.e., Kent) and eleven gentlemen from any part of England, exclusive of Kent". Kent, described as "the unconquerable county", won by "a very few notches". The second match was at the Artillery Ground in Bunhill Fields, Finsbury on Monday, 23 July. This game was drawn and a report includes the phrase "eleven picked out of all (sic) England". Top-level cricket at that time, however, was limited to the southeastern counties.

Before these matches, there were instances of teams representing a number of counties. On Thursday, 28 August 1729, a match between Edwin Stead's XI and Sir William Gage's XI was held at Penshurst Park, near Tunbridge Wells in Kent. The match had the alternative title of Kent (Stead) v Surrey, Sussex & Hampshire (Gage). It was 11-a-side and played for 100 guineas with some thousands watching. It seems to have been the first known innings victory as Gage "got (within three) in one hand, as the former did in two hands, so the Kentish men (i.e., Stead's team) threw it up". A contemporary report states that "(Thomas Waymark) turned the scale of victory, which for some years past has been generally on the Kentish side". Given a 1728 reference to the superiority of Kent in the 1720s, it would seem that only a team representing three other counties had the strength to compete against them.

== Generic usage ==
After 1739, "England" (sometimes "All England") became a generic term used to denote numerous teams over the next 150 years. "All England" was an archaic term for the former Kingdom of England, but it continued to be used in common speech long after the Acts of Union 1707. The teams invariably played historically important matches (first-class from 1864), depending on the quality of their opponents. (Note: Any match listed in the ACS' Important Match Guide (1981) is historically important, and therefore of the highest standard, whether or not a scorecard might exist. The same applies to numerous matches discovered by researchers since 1981. For further information, see First-class cricket.)

Sometimes, they were given names like "The Rest", which more accurately describes them vis-à-vis their opponents. CricketArchive (CA) lists 29 matches involving teams called England or The Rest between 1739 and 1778. These are all important matches but only one, England v Kent in 1744, has a scorecard. CA lists all matches involving teams called England without differentiating between international and non-international, so it seems they unhelpfully (and incorrectly) assume the "England" team of 1772 to be a direct predecessor of the modern England Test team.

== All England Eleven (the AEE) ==
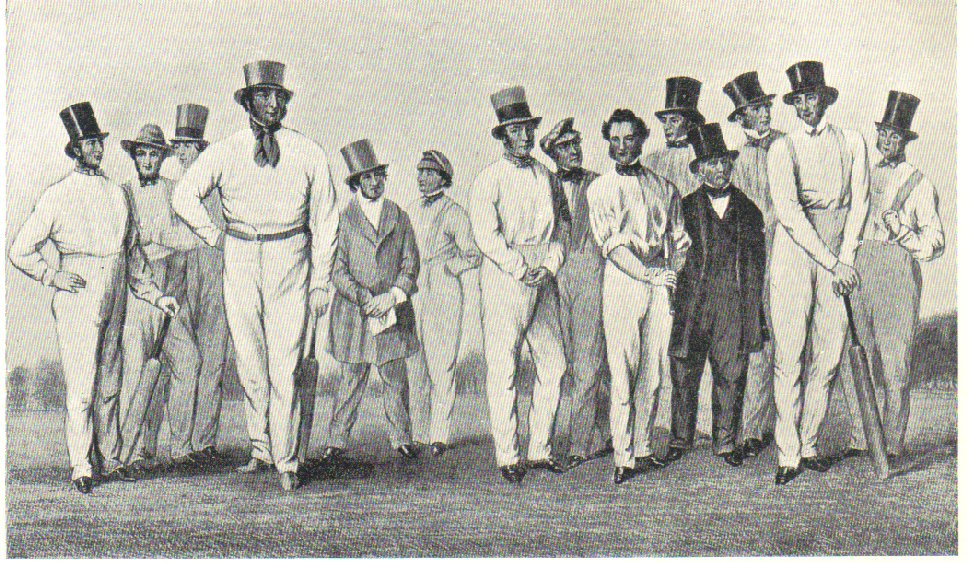
William Clarke (centre, wearing tall hat) with his All England Eleven team in 1847.

The name "All England" took on a specific meaning in 1846 when William Clarke founded the All England Eleven, commonly known as the AEE, as a touring team of leading players. Its purpose was to take advantage of the new railway network, and play matches at city venues, mainly in the North of England. Clarke's team was indeed an important side worthy of its title as, in 1846, it consisted of himself, Joe Guy, George Parr (all of Nottinghamshire), William Lillywhite, Jemmy Dean (both Sussex), William Denison, Will Martingell (both Surrey), Fuller Pilch, Alfred Mynn, Nicholas Wanostrocht (aka "Felix") and William Hillyer (all Kent). Their matches in Sheffield, Manchester and Leeds were a huge success and very profitable, especially for Clarke himself. He made sure his players were paid more than by MCC—from £4 to £6 per week—and so keep them interested. He kept the surplus for himself.

The AEE continued for several years to showcase the best players of the day. Subsequent additions to the squad included John Wisden of Sussex, William Dorrinton of Kent, Tom Sewell Sr and his son Tom Sewell Jr of Surrey. Because of its strength, the AEE generally played "odds" matches against teams composed of twenty-two men, though these odds were reduced when opposed to such as Sheffield, Manchester, and some county teams.

The AEE lasted until 1880. In all matches, George Parr with 10,404 runs (av 16.78) was its leading batter, and Clarke himself took the most wickets (2,385).

== United All England Eleven (UEE) ==
In 1852, several players set up the United All England Eleven (UEE) as a rival to the AEE. Clarke would have nothing to do with the UEE but he died in 1856 and, from 1857 to 1866, matches were played between these two teams which were perhaps the most important contests of the English season – certainly judged by the quality of the players.

The AEE/UEE concept expanded with the formation of other itinerant elevens, notably the United North of England Eleven (UNEE) and the United South of England Eleven (USEE), the latter showcasing W. G. Grace.

The travelling elevens ran their course over a period of some thirty seasons, but interest in them waned as county cricket grew and provided matches with a more competitive edge. With the advent of international cricket in the 1870s, especially following the hugely successful inaugural Australian tour in 1878, the travelling elevens faded away.

== Non-international England teams ==
Teams styled England, and commonly referred to as England, continued to play non-international matches into the 1880s but, thereafter, they tended to be given names such as The Rest because the England national team was by then well-established and understood to represent the country for the purpose of international cricket.

The earliest match involving a team styled "The Rest of England" took place at Bradford Park Avenue in June 1883 when the opposition was a composite Nottinghamshire and Yorkshire XI. The combined counties won by 6 wickets.

In the 20th century, Test trial matches were occasionally staged (the last in 1976) and these were called England v The Rest, but it is generally understood that the England of these games was the national side while The Rest formed the "rest of England" element.

== See also ==
- The Rest (Bombay)
- Rest of India
- Rest of Australia
- Rest of South Africa

== Bibliography ==
- ACS (1981). A Guide to Important Cricket Matches Played in the British Isles 1709–1863. Nottingham: ACS. OCLC 85045528.
- Waghorn, H. T. (1899). Cricket Scores, Notes, &c. From 1730–1773. Edinburgh: Blackwood. OCLC 1086375331.
