= History of English cricket (1826–1845) =

In English cricket, the years 1826–1845 were dominated by the roundarm bowling issue, which was resolved when the style was legalised in 1835, and by the formation of the first modern county clubs between 1839 and 1845.

== Background ==
Cricket had been badly impacted by the Napoleonic Wars with a significant loss of both investment and manpower. While a recovery began in 1815, and a more widespread return to normality can be observed, it was not until 1825 that inter-county matches resumed. County cricket had been very popular in the 18th century and it was revived by Sussex and Kent in the 1820s and 1830s. The first county clubs were founded in this period. Since its foundation in 1787, Marylebone Cricket Club (MCC) had become cricket's most influential organisation, especially in its role as the guardian of the Laws of Cricket and Lord's, its home ground, was the sport's premier venue.

== Roundarm bowling ==
The controversy surrounding roundarm bowling came to a head before the 1827 season began and three trial matches were played between Sussex and an England Eleven. No firm conclusions were drawn in the immediate aftermath of the trials and it was many years before roundarm was formally legalised.

In 1828, MCC modified Rule 10 of the Laws of Cricket in an attempt at compromise. The amendment permitted the bowler's hand to be raised as high as the elbow. In practice, however, Sussex bowlers William Lillywhite and Jem Broadbridge continued to bowl at shoulder height and the umpires did not no-ball them. Roundarm's supporters claimed that their campaign was a "March of Intellect".

In 1835, powerless to prevent the use of roundarm, MCC finally amended the Laws of Cricket to make it legal. The relevant part of the Law stated: "if the hand be above the shoulder in the delivery, the umpire must call No Ball". Bowlers' hands now started to go above the shoulder and the 1835 Law had to be reinforced in 1845 by removing benefit of the doubt from the bowler in the matter of his hand's height when delivering the ball.

== County cricket ==
From 1826, inter-county cricket flourished again, following its post-war revival in 1825. (Note: Some eleven-a-side matches played from 1772 to 1863 have been rated "first-class" by certain sources. However, the term only came into common use around 1864, when overarm bowling was legalised. It was formally defined as a standard by a meeting at Lord's, in May 1894, of Marylebone Cricket Club (MCC) and the county clubs which were then competing in the County Championship. The ruling was effective from the beginning of the 1895 season, but pre-1895 matches of the same standard have no official definition of status because the ruling is not retrospective. Matches of a similar standard since the beginning of the 1864 season are generally considered to have an unofficial first-class status. Pre-1864 matches which are included in the ACS' "Important Match Guide" may generally be regarded as important or, at least, historically significant. For further information, see First-class cricket.) Leadership came from the Sussex county organisation based on the Midhurst club. Sussex played matches against Kent and a combined Hampshire/Surrey.

The earliest mentions of the sport were recorded in the counties of Staffordshire (1817), Herefordshire (1823), Worcestershire (1829), Westmorland (1827) and Cumberland (1828) during this period, cricket in all other counties having been recorded in earlier times.

The first real move towards the establishment of a county club took place in 1836. Although Sussex had been a major centre of cricket since the 17th century, there had apparently been no move towards a permanent county organisation until 17 June 1836 when a meeting in Brighton set up a Sussex Cricket Fund to support county matches. It was from this organisation that Sussex County Cricket Club was formally constituted in 1839.

The 1837 season saw the beginning of Kent's dominance of English county cricket which lasted through the 1840s. Mainstays of Kent in those years included Alfred Mynn, Fuller Pilch, Nicholas Felix, Ned Wenman and William Hillyer. The team claimed a total of eight Champion County titles between 1837 and 1849.

On 28 August 1844, a match on Hartlebury Common between teams from Worcestershire and Shropshire is the earliest known reference to a county team in Worcestershire.

In the early 1840s, Dr Henry Grace and his brother-in-law Alfred Pocock had founded the Mangotsfield Cricket Club which merged in 1846 with the West Gloucestershire Cricket Club, whose name was adopted until 1867, after which it became the Gloucestershire County Cricket Club. In 1863, the Cheltenham and Gloucestershire Cricket Club was founded and is believed to have been a forerunner of Gloucestershire County Cricket Club, which had definitely been founded by 1871. Exact details of the club's foundation have been lost.

== England Elevens ==
5 May 1826 — a significant event that would in time accelerate the spread of cricket throughout England was the passage of an Act of Parliament that authorised creation of the Liverpool to Manchester Railway and effectively began the "railway boom". William Clarke was the first to comprehend the potential benefits of rail travel for cricket and, in 1845, began to plan the formation of a travelling All England Eleven which would realise that potential and claim its resultant profits.

== Matches, venues and teams ==
In 1833, Yorkshire was used as a team name for the first time on record because Sheffield were playing against Norfolk, a county team.

Nottinghamshire as a county team, and perhaps also as a county club, played its first inter-county match v. Sussex at Brown's Ground, Brighton on 27, 28 & 29 August 1835. Previous matches involved Nottingham as a town rather than Nottinghamshire as a county. Nottinghamshire is recognised as a county team from 1835.

In 1838, the Trent Bridge ground in Nottingham was opened by William Clarke.

On 1 March 1839, Sussex County Cricket Club was constituted out of the Sussex Cricket Fund organisation that had been set up in 1836. Sussex was formally established as the first county cricket club and replaced the ad hoc county elevens representing the traditional county of Sussex in important cricket.

The new Sussex club played its first important match versus MCC at Lord's on 10 & 11 June 1839.

Nottinghamshire County Cricket Club was founded in March or April 1841. The exact date has been lost and it is possible that an informal county club may have been created in 1835 out of the old Nottingham town club. The official foundation of Nottinghamshire is dated 1841.

In 1841, the Duke of Wellington issued an order that a cricket ground must be made as an adjunct to every military barracks.

On 6 August 1842, formation of the first Kent County Club at Canterbury; a second club was created at Maidstone in 1859 and the two combined in 1870 to form Kent County Cricket Club. Kent's Canterbury Week and The Old Stagers were instituted in 1842. The Canterbury club played its first important match against an England Eleven at the White Hart Ground, Bromley on 25, 26 & 27 August 1842.

Surrey County Cricket Club was officially founded by a meeting which took place at the new Kennington Oval during a match between two local teams on 21 & 22 August 1845.

In 1845, I Zingari (the Gypsies) formed as a travelling club.

== Gentlemen v Players ==
The fixture was revived in 1827 and the Players were handicapped in various ways for many years to try and equalise the teams.

== North v South ==
The inaugural North v South fixture between the North of England and South of England cricket teams was held at Lord's on 11 & 12 July 1836. The North won by 6 wickets.

== Noted people ==
31 December 1826. Death of John Small, the great Hambledon batsman, aged 89.

The 1832 season was overshadowed by the early death of James Saunders on 27 March. He was only 29 and had been ill with consumption for the last two years. Scores and Biographies states that he was a "great batsman" who "had scarcely reached his prime". He was a fine attacking batsman who had the potential to be one of the greats.

Active players, administrators and other contributors of the period included:

- William Ashby
- Jem Broadbridge
- William Clarke
- James Cobbett
- J. H. Dark
- Nicholas Felix
- Henry Grace
- Charles Hawkins
- William Hillyer
- Herbert Jenner
- William Lillywhite
- Tom Marsden
- W. Meyrick
- Alfred Mynn
- Fuller Pilch
- Alfred Pocock
- George Rawlins
- Sam Redgate
- William Searle
- James Saunders
- Charles Taylor
- Ned Wenman
- Charles Wordsworth

== Achievements ==
Tom Marsden had only one innings in 1826, scoring 227 for Sheffield and Leicester v Nottingham at the Darnall New Ground in Sheffield. A report said Marsden batted over eight hours, approximately 4½ hours on 25 July and 3½ hours on the 26th.

== MCC and Lord's ==
The Lord's Pavilion, gutted by fire in July 1825, was rebuilt in time for MCC's annual dinner on Thursday, 11 May.

In 1835, the lease of Lord's was transferred to J. H. Dark, who remained proprietor until 1864.

In 1842, Roger Kynaston succeeded Benjamin Aislabie as secretary of MCC (to 1858).

== Single wicket ==
John Major on pp. 405–409 has listed numerous single wicket events during the period.

== Literature ==
Arthur Haygarth closed his Scores & Biographies, Volume 1 at the end of the 1826 season.

John Nyren published The Cricketers Of My Time and The Young Cricketer's Tutor in 1833. These works were written from Nyren's recollections by Charles Cowden Clarke and had been serialised in The Town during the previous year.

== Schools and universities ==
The importance of cricket in the public schools and universities cannot be overstated, especially the influence of public school cricket and its Victorian ethics upon the growth of the British Empire and the spread of industrialisation. The period saw an increasing number of good amateur players come through the education system and make their mark in cricket.

First recorded century in a school match: 146 not out by W. Meyrick for Winchester v Harrow in 1826.

On 4–5 June 1827, Cambridge University v Oxford University at Lord's was the first-ever University Match. The result was a draw. The captains were Charles Wordsworth (Oxford) and Herbert Jenner (Cambridge). It became an annual fixture in 1838. Cricket was also played at Durham University from at least 1842.

== Rules and equipment ==
In 1835, in addition to legalising roundarm, the Laws of Cricket were amended to enforce a compulsory follow on if the team batting second was 100 runs behind on first innings.

Batting pads were probably invented in 1836 and gradually came into widespread use.

Changes in fashion affected the sport and a reaction to the virility cult espoused by Beauclerk and his ilk brought about the introduction of safer equipment such as padded leg-guards and padded gloves. Wicketkeeping gloves were first mentioned about 1820 and were in general use by 1850. Batting pads had been proposed much earlier, particularly by Robert Robinson, but it was not until the horrific leg injury suffered by Alfred Mynn in 1836 from a ball by Sam Redgate that pads were seen as an essential item of equipment.

Curiously, whereas Sam Redgate was viewed with trepidation in terms of his pace, he was very much a reactionary in fashion terms. Among professionals in the 1830s, he was said to be the last to discard breeches in favour of trousers. Trousers have existed since ancient times but never became fashionable until the sans-culottes of the French Revolution. In England, they began to replace breeches during the Napoleonic War and were widely in use by 1815. Redgate was not alone in his preference for breeches: the Eton and Harrow teams still wore them in 1830.

With trousers came the belts with metal clasps that remained popular until well into the 20th century. Many professionals preferred braces.

Wigs went out with the 18th century and men followed the lead of Napoleon Bonaparte by having their long hair cut short. The Hambledon players had worn hats when playing and this fashion persisted except that the style of hat changed dramatically. By 1830, the tall "beaver" hats familiar in pictures of William Lillywhite and Fuller Pilch had become common. These would be either black or white. Many players preferred a straw hat based on the rural style but these were replaced by white bowler hats, first worn by I Zingari in 1845, which were usually adorned with a ribbon in club colours.

The tall hats were replaced before 1850 by the flannel cap which tended to be either white or chequered. Then the familiar cricket cap began to appear. The schools adopted these first: Eton (light blue) and Winchester (blue) in 1851; Harrow (striped) in 1852. The blue caps worn by Cambridge and Oxford date from about 1861 and 1863 respectively. The county clubs gradually introduced their own caps thereafter though the amateurs still tended to wear their school caps.

Coloured shirts were worn in the middle years of the century as team uniforms, though all were a pattern on a white background (e.g., the All England Eleven wore white shirts with pink spots). The frilled shirts of Georgian times were replaced by plain cloth. Some players wore high collars and many used a rather large bow tie.

Footwear was almost universally confined to the black "Oxford" shoe.

A kind of short white flannel jacket had originally been mentioned as early as 1812 and this was probably an early form of blazer.

== See also ==
- History of English cricket (1801–1825)
- History of English cricket (1846–1863)

== Bibliography ==
- ACS (1981). A Guide to Important Cricket Matches Played in the British Isles 1709–1863. Nottingham: ACS. Archived from the original on 20 September 2022.
- ACS (1982). A Guide to First Class Cricket Matches Played in the British Isles. Nottingham: ACS.
- Bowen, Rowland (1970). Cricket: A History of its Growth and Development. London: Eyre & Spottiswoode. ISBN 978-04-13278-60-9.
