= 1837 English cricket season =

Cricket season review

The 1837 English cricket season was the 11th of the roundarm era. (Note: Any match listed in the ACS' Important Match Guide (1981) is historically important, and therefore of the highest standard, whether or not a scorecard might exist. The same applies to numerous matches discovered by researchers since 1981. For further information, see First-class cricket.) Kent began a period of dominance as the "champion county".

== Important matches ==
1837 match list

== Events ==
Kent was proclaimed Champion County and this marks the beginning of a great period in the county's history. The team claimed a total of eight titles between 1837 and 1849. Mainstays of the Kent in those years included Alfred Mynn, Fuller Pilch, Nicholas Felix, Ned Wenman and William Hillyer.

== Leading batsmen ==
Fuller Pilch was the leading runscorer with 372 @ 26.57

Other leading batsmen were: EG Wenman, EH Grimston, T Box, J Cobbett, J Broadbridge, G Millyard

== Leading bowlers ==
William Lillywhite was the leading wicket-taker with 99

Other leading bowlers were: S Redgate, J Cobbett, J Bayley, J Broadbridge, JH Kirwan, TM Adams, CG Taylor

== Bibliography ==
- ACS (1981). A Guide to Important Cricket Matches Played in the British Isles 1709–1863. Nottingham: ACS. OCLC 85045528.
- Haygarth, Arthur (1997) [1862]. Scores & Biographies, Volume 2 (1827–1840). Kennington: Frederick Lillywhite. ISBN 978-19-00592-23-9.
- Warner, Pelham (1946). Lords: 1787–1945. London: Harrap. OCLC 877106024.
