= English cricket team in Australia in 1861–62 =

English cricket tour of Australia (1861–62)

An English cricket team toured Australia in 1861–62. This was the first-ever tour of Australia by any overseas team and the second tour abroad by an English team, following the one to North America in 1859. The team is sometimes referred to as H. H. Stephenson's XI.

== Organisers ==
The idea for the tour came from the English proprietors of a Melbourne catering company called Spiers and Pond, which ran the Café de Paris in the city. Spiers was Felix William Spiers and Pond was Christopher Pond. Their representative in England, a Mr Mallam, had tried to interest Charles Dickens in a lecture tour of Australia and New Zealand but without success. Instead, having noted the success of the 1859 venture, and the growing popularity of cricket in Australia, Spiers and Pond decided to attract a team of leading English cricketers. Mallam therefore journeyed to Birmingham in September 1861 to watch the North v. South game at Aston Park.

During the game, Mallam met the cricketers at the nearby Hen and Chicken Hotel to make a business proposal. As a result, 12 players agreed to tour Australia the following winter, on terms of £150 per man plus expenses.

== Squad ==
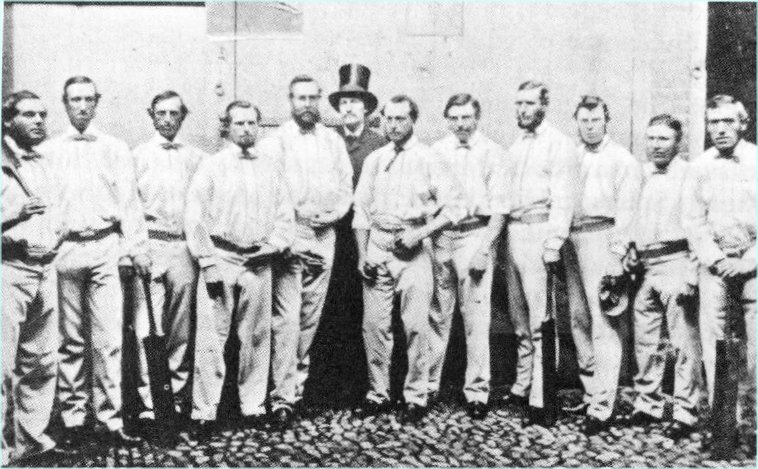
English cricket team of 1861 just prior to departure for Australia.

The team was captained by H. H. Stephenson (Surrey) who was joined by William Caffyn, Will Mortlock, George Griffith, William Mudie, Tom Sewell junior (all Surrey); Roger Iddison, Ned Stephenson (both Yorkshire); Tom Hearne, Charles Lawrence (both Middlesex); George Wells (Sussex); and George Bennett (Kent). Stephenson and Caffyn had toured America in 1859.

== Tour ==
The team sailed from Liverpool on 20 October in the SS Great Britain, arriving in Melbourne on 24 December. The visit created enormous interest in Australia with a vast crowd greeting the team's arrival at Sandridge (Port Melbourne).

As a team, they played 12 matches, winning 6 and losing 2 with 4 drawn. All but one of these games were against odds of at least 18 to 11. The exception was a one-day single innings match.

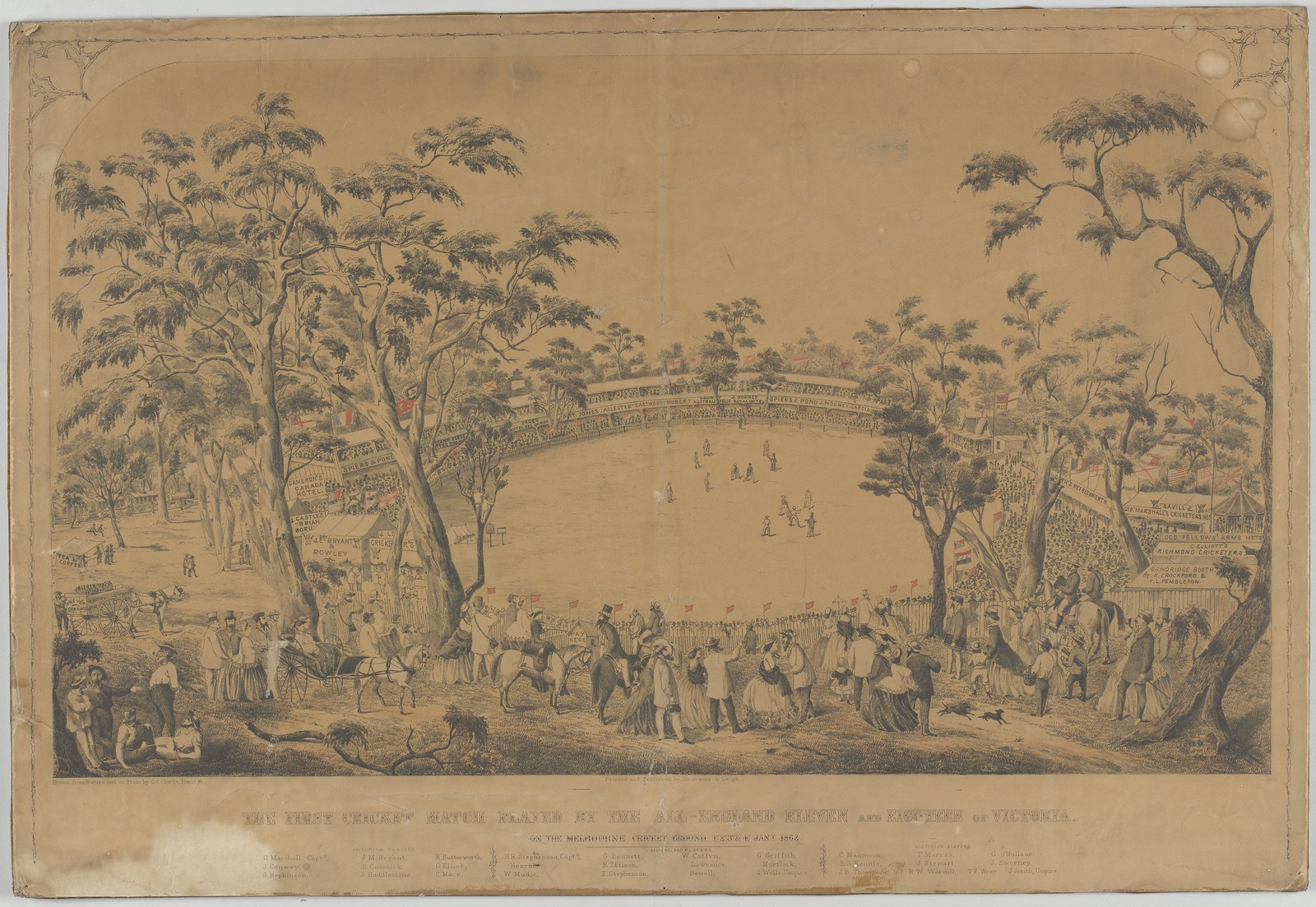
The England 11 versus Victoria's 18, MCG 1–4 January. 1862.(State Library Victoria)

The first match of the tour, against Victoria in Melbourne, drew 45,000 spectators over three days, enabling Spiers and Pond to pay the tour's expenses after just one match.

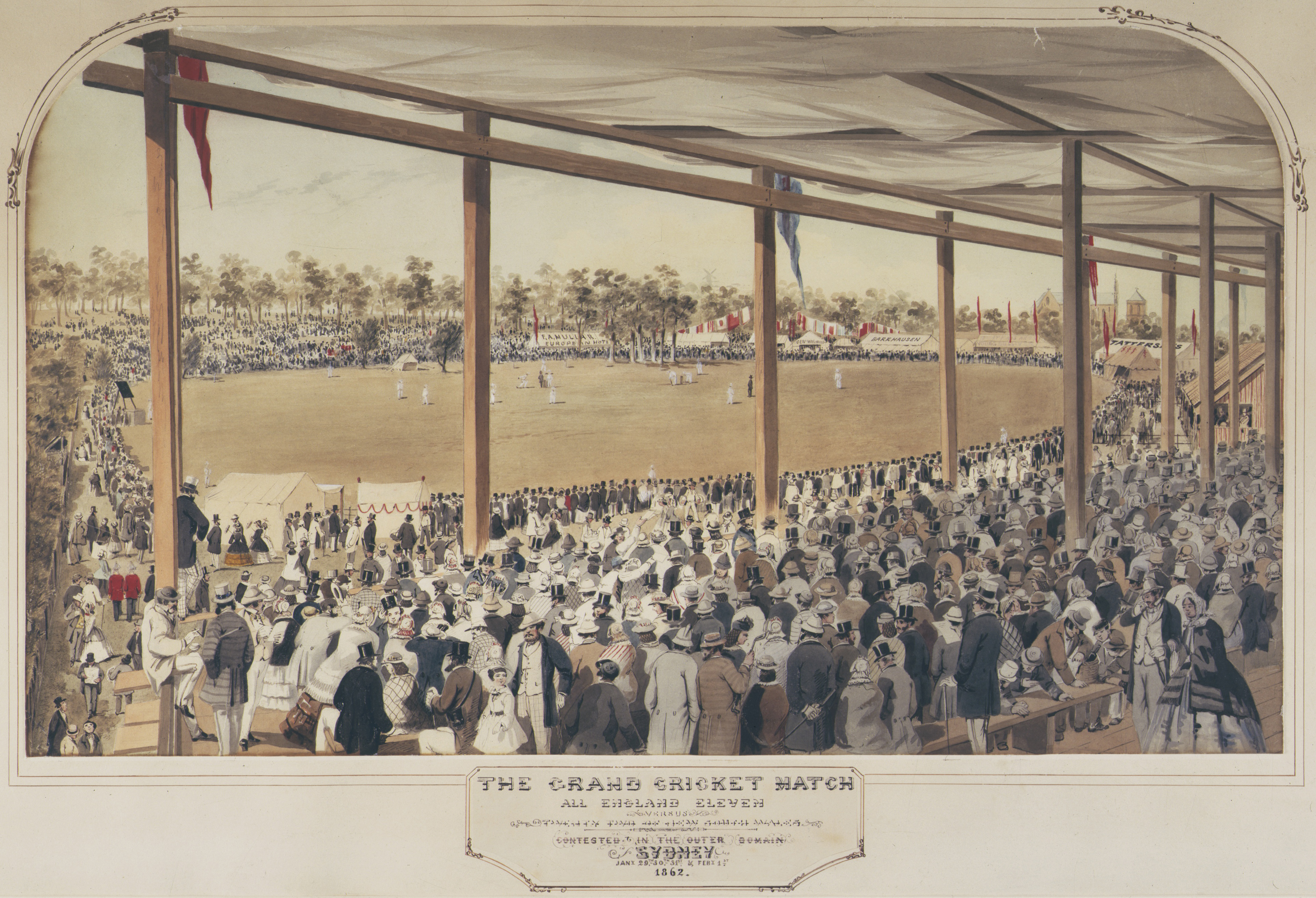
All-England eleven versus twenty-two of New South Wales, Outer Domain, Sydney, 29 January to 1 February 1862. Watercolour by S. T. Gill.

Later in January 1862, the team played New South Wales on the Sydney Domain; the Secretary for Lands, John Robertson controversially allowed the promoters to charge admission to the public while arranging a free stand for parliamentarians.

The team divided for a match in March 1862 at the Melbourne Cricket Ground that has been called The World v Surrey. The six Surrey players were joined by five locals, who reportedly had Surrey affiliations, to form the Surrey Eleven; the World XI was formed of the six non-Surrey tourists and another five locals. The World XI won by 6 wickets thanks to an outstanding all-round performance by George Bennett who scored 72 and then took 7-30 and 7-85. This game drew a good attendance of about 8,000. One of the World XI locals was John Conway of Victoria who later managed the first Australian team to tour England.

The tour was certainly successful in the long-term sense that it inspired later English teams to visit Australia. The team arrived back in England on 12 May 1862.

This first tour greatly promoted the development of Australia cricket. Charles Lawrence (sometimes spelled as Laurence) remained in Sydney as a professional coach with the Albert Cricket Club. He captained New South Wales in intercolonial matches and captain-coached the famous Aboriginal cricket team that completed the first cricket tour of England in 1868. After the 1863/64 tour Billy Caffyn also stayed on in Australia, first as a professional with the Melbourne Cricket Club, and then with the Warwick Club in Sydney.

Both men had an enormous influence on the development of the new generation of Australian cricketers.

== External sources ==
- CricketArchive tour itinerary
- Playing Fields Through to Battle Fields
- Early cricket in Australia - State Library of NSW
- The All England 11 and the birth of Australian cricket - State Library Victoria
