= Trent Bridge Inn =

Pub in Nottinghamshire, England

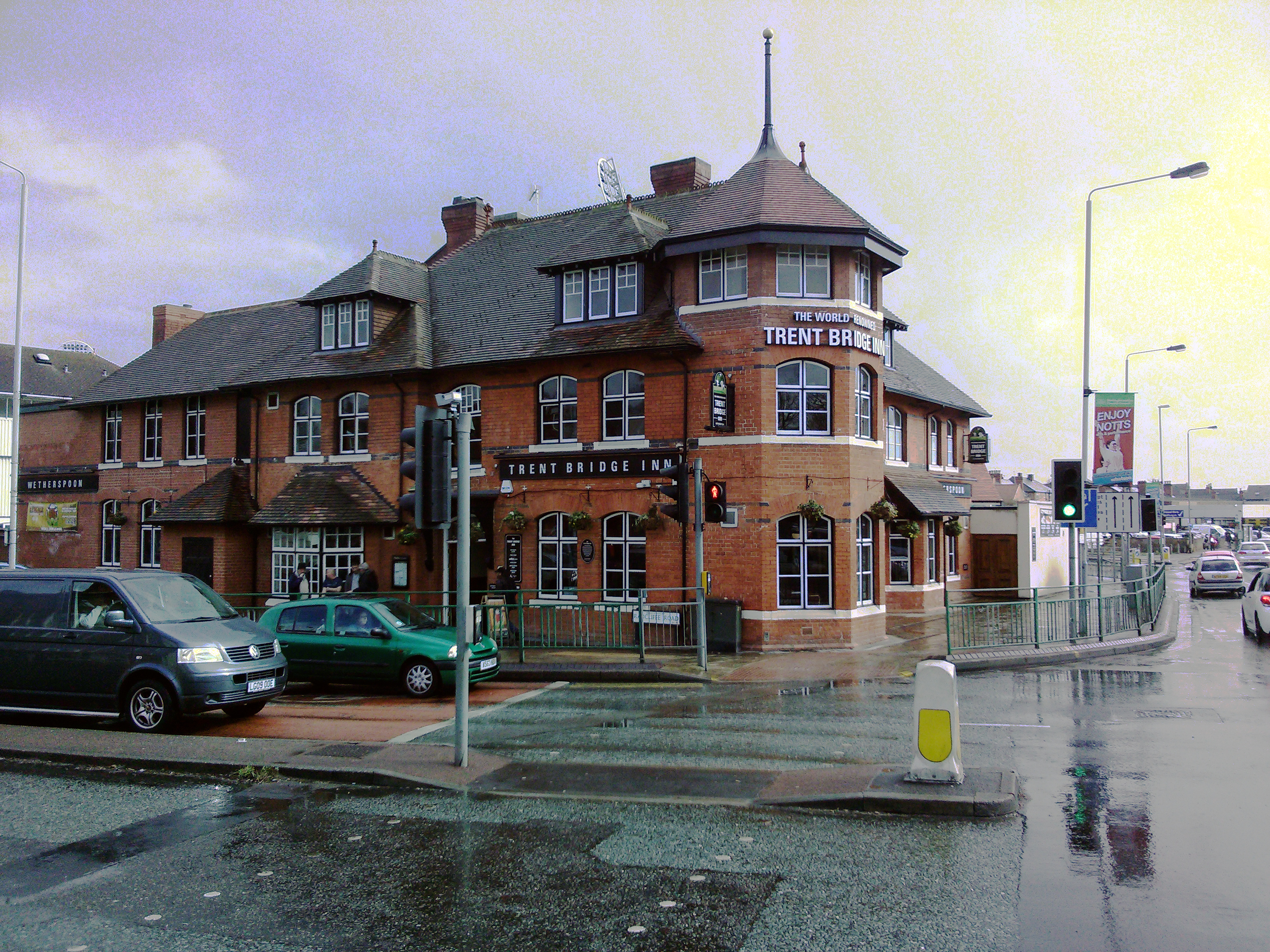

- Location within Nottinghamshire

General information
- Location: 2 Radcliffe Road, West Bridgford, Nottinghamshire, England
- Coordinates: 52.9372°N 1.13408°W

The Trent Bridge Inn is a pub in West Bridgford, Nottinghamshire, England. The Trent Bridge Cricket Ground began in a field behind this pub, and the land was also the first home of the Notts County Football Club. The pub is now operated by Wetherspoons.

== History ==
The Trent Bridge Inn in West Bridgford existed before there was a cricket ground. It was located just outside the walls of the city of Nottingham where travellers could stay whilst they waited to enter the city the following morning. The inn was owned by the Musters family who owned land in West Bridgford. At the time because of a different boundary the inn was in Nottingham, there was no licensed property at all in West Bridgford.

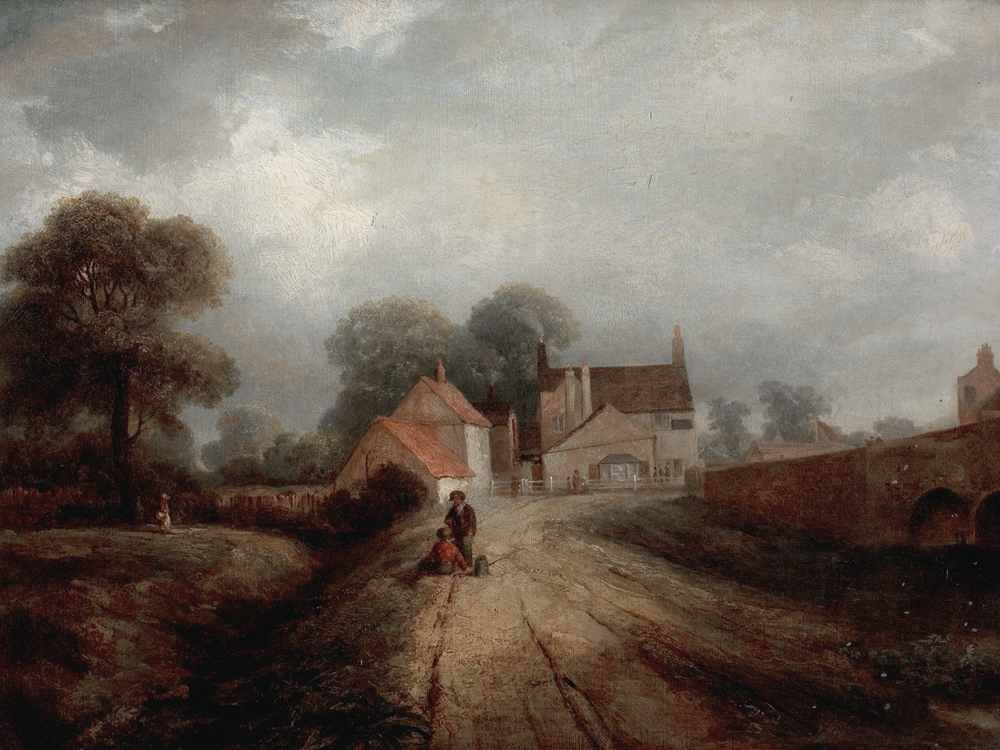
The Inn in 1850 by Robert Bradley

The inn was instrumental in creating the cricket ground which was set up in competition to the one owned by the town council. The first cricket match here was created by William Clarke in 1838 who was the captain of the Nottinghamshire cricket team. He had married Mary Chapman, the landlady of the Trent Bridge Inn, and they had arranged for the land behind the inn to be made available. (Generally land outside the city could not be built on until the law was changed in 1845). The Clarkes had the land cleared and a fence was erected. Matches were held here in preference to the former location within the city which had been used since 1835. The players were able to stay at the inn during the matches.

The cricket matches did not attract large crowds and publican William Clarke experimented with other attractions. In 1845 Clarke decided to move to London to found the All England Eleven which became a nationally known touring cricket team. John Chapman who was Clarke's step son took over the management of the (pub and) ground for some time but he and his successor enjoyed no great success.

1861 saw the launch of the Easter Colts Trials where 22 players were invited to take on the first eleven in competition. This match was arranged by a local solicitor, John Johnson, who since 1859 had reinvigorated the club organising a committee and a first brick pavilion. The new match attracted audiences to see who was the best combined batter and bowler and of the first 22 contestants, seven went on to play first class cricket for Nottinghamshire.

Richard Daft was a well known cricketer at Trent Bridge and he ran the inn at one time as he was a partner in the Radcliffe Brewery. He is remembered for captaining the club for ten years but he died a bankrupt in 1900.

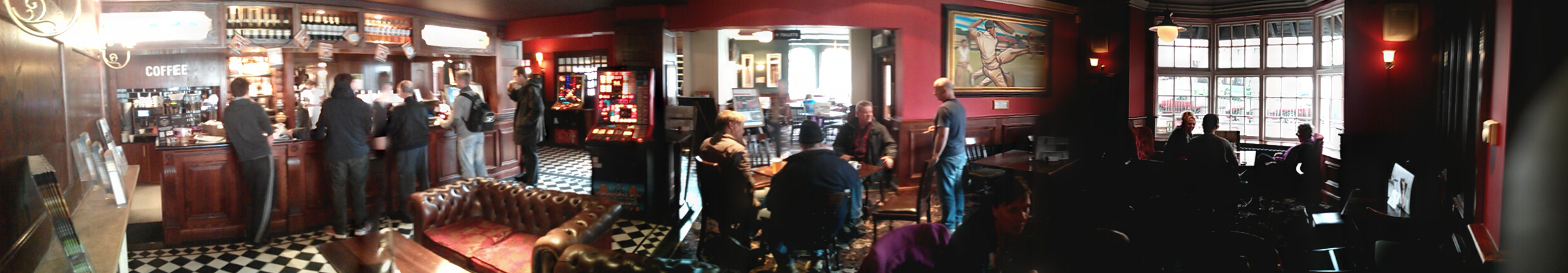
The pub has five bars following a £1m plus refurbishment

In 1883 the nearby land was also used by the Notts County Football Club who created a ground on the eastern side. However, by 1895 they were to move grounds regularly until they found their current home in 1910. At the end of the First World War the Musters family sold the Inn and the ground to the cricket club. The club only briefly owned the inn as they resold it to a brewery for a sum in excess of the money they had paid to the Musters. However the Inn was given the right to supply food to the ground in perpetuity.

The pub was bought by Wetherspoons and a sum of 3 million pounds was spent in a refurbishment. It re-opened on 24 May 2011 and features four bars.

== Notable features ==
On the outside of the building is a bench mark which records the pub's precise location.

== External links and sources ==
- The Trent Bridge Inn, Nottingham at J D Wetherspoon
