= William Mudie =

William Mudie may refer to:

- William Mudie (cricketer), English cricketer
- William Henry Mudie, Anglican priest and educator in Adelaide, South Australia
- William Moodie, or Mudie, Scottish minister
