= Queens Road Cricket Ground =

Cricket ground in England

- Interactive map of Queens Road Cricket Ground

Ground information
- Location: Wisbech, Cambridgeshire
- Country: England
- Coordinates: 52.6635°N 0.1572°E
- Establishment: 1851 (first recorded match)

Team information
Cambridgeshire	(1867)
- As of 12 September 2010; Source: Ground profile

Queens Road Cricket Ground was a cricket ground in Wisbech, Cambridgeshire. The first recorded match on the ground was in 1851, when Wisbech played an All England Eleven.

The ground held a single first-class match when Cambridgeshire played Yorkshire in 1867.

The site of the ground today would be along Queens Road, which still exists within Wisbech today. Its likely location would be at the northern end of Queens Road.
