= Joe Guy =

Joe Guy may refer to:

- Joe Guy (cricketer) (1813–1873), English cricketer
- Joe Guy (musician) (1920–1962), American jazz trumpeter
