= George Griffith (cricketer) =

English cricketer

Cricket information
- Batting: Left-handed
- Bowling: Left-arm fast (round-arm); Left-arm slow (under-arm)

Career statistics
Competition	FC
Matches	243
Runs scored	6,314
Batting average	15.94
100s/50s	2/20
Top score	142
Balls bowled	27,410
Wickets	668
Bowling average	16.89
5 wickets in innings	51
10 wickets in match	9
Best bowling	9/130
Catches/stumpings	202/3
- Source: , 2 July 2020

George Griffith (20 December 1833 – 3 May 1879) was an English cricketer. Known by his nickname "Ben" or the altogether more stirring "Lion Hitter", he was a high-quality all-rounder. Left-handed both as a batsman and bowler, he could bowl either fast roundarm or slow underarm, and he was also a fine fielder. He was born at Ripley, Surrey.

== Overview of his playing career ==
Griffith's career, in which he played primarily for Surrey, lasted from 1856 to 1872. He also played for the United All England Eleven, including appearing in their prestigious fixtures against the All England Eleven.

Having initially worked as a baker, he played for the Priory Park Club in Chichester until 1856, joining Surrey the following year. He left the staff at the end of the 1863 season because of a disagreement over terms, but he continued to play for the club until 1872.

== His finest years ==
1864 was a great year for George Griffith. Regarded at the time as the biggest hitter in cricket, he played seventeen matches and scored 489 runs. His left-handed round-arm fast bowling was also very highly thought of, and he took 69 wickets that season – although some of them came via slow lobs. That figure was supplemented by 26 catches, more than anyone else in the country. The previous season he had been even more successful with the bat, though rather less so with the ball, and made his highest score of 142 against Sussex at Hove.

== Overseas tours ==
Griffith went on two of the earliest overseas tours, the first involved travelling on the SS Great Britain with HH Stephenson to Australia in 1861/2 and the second with Edgar Willsher to North America in 1868. No matches on either tour were claased as important, with one exception on the former tour, when the touring team divided for a match in March 1862 at the Melbourne Cricket Ground that has been called "The World Eleven v Surrey Eleven". The six Surrey players from the touring team were joined by five locals, who reportedly had Surrey affiliations, to form the Surrey Eleven; the World Eleven was formed of the six non-Surrey tourists and another five locals. Though the Surrey Eleven lost by 6 wickets, Griffith took 5/52 and 2/37 and scored 39 and 13.

During this tour, which was a tremendous all-round success for him, Griffith and his team-mates pitched their tent at Beechworth, where they were to take on a local XXII over the course of three days. The Beechworth players collapsed quickly, however, being bowled out for twenty (twelve ducks), and the match was over long before the allocated time. The third day, therefore, saw Griffith take on a Beechworth XI all on his own. With the aid of three fielders, he dismissed the locals for one run, before scoring the two runs that he required for victory. The locals were naturally dumbfounded. After the chief clash at Castlemain, which the Englishmen lost, Griffith, Lawrence and Iddison recovered some of their dented pride by beating eleven of the locals in another single-wicket match.

== The celebrated hitter ==
Very popular with the ring at Lord's and, indeed, all other grounds, Griffith was reputed to be the hardest hitter of his time. Edward Eardley-Wilmot and EC Streatfield recalled in their book, Charterhouse: Old and New: "Ben Griffiths, with his shoulders high up in his head, hitting merrily left-handedly all over the field". The following line of verse also describes him in romantic terms:

"If George Griffith gets a loose one, he will send it far away."

Harry Altham, in his celebrated book, A History of Cricket, noted that "not without cause has the poet sung ... for by common consent he was the hardest hitter known until the time of CI Thornton." James Pycroft confirms this: "Griffiths among the professionals and Mr. Thornton among the gentlemen are the two hardest hitters of my time; I mean in their usual style of play. Griffiths however, never seemed to exert himself or to play for sensational long hits."

W. J. Ford wrote more than once of a vast hit of Griffith's which sailed clean out of The Oval, over the heads of the many Surrey boundary-riders and then over the pavilion. Ford reckoned that, "Of the old-time professionals, Griffiths was the biggest hitter I remember."

One of his hits, in the 1865 Surrey-Middlesex match at Islington, was measured and found to be 119 yards. 34 years later, it was recalled: "A good deal was made of it in the reports at the time, but although, of course, it wasn't nearly equal to many of Thornton's best, I think in the present day you might sit and watch cricket for a long time without seeing a hit as good."

Griffith also once hit all four balls (although Ford mistakenly wrote about six) of an over right out of the Hastings ground in 1864, when playing for a United Eleven. Standing at the ground's northernmost wicket, Griffith bludgeoned each of the deliveries into exactly the same spot, clean over the fence to the Goods Station Road tavern on the right-hand area of the ground, each of them counting as "lost" sixes. The unfortunate bowler was slow bowler Farmer Bennett of Kent—but his mood was in stark contrast to that of the crowd, recorded by the Hastings & St Leonards Observer to have been "in a state of high excitement at such an unprecedented circumstance. General and oft-repeated applause showed the warmth of feeling that existed." A hat was passed around at the end of the game and a large collection taken for Griffith's benefit. As the game was not an important match, his feat did not count as a record, but, as Pycroft recalled, "This we never knew equalled".

== After his playing days ==
He umpired 24 matches between 1869 and 1876, and ran the Talbot Tap public house, adjoining the Talbot Hotel in the High Street, Ripley. He committed suicide at Stoke next Guildford, Surrey, aged 43.
