= William Denison (cricketer) =

English cricket writer, journalist, administrator, and player

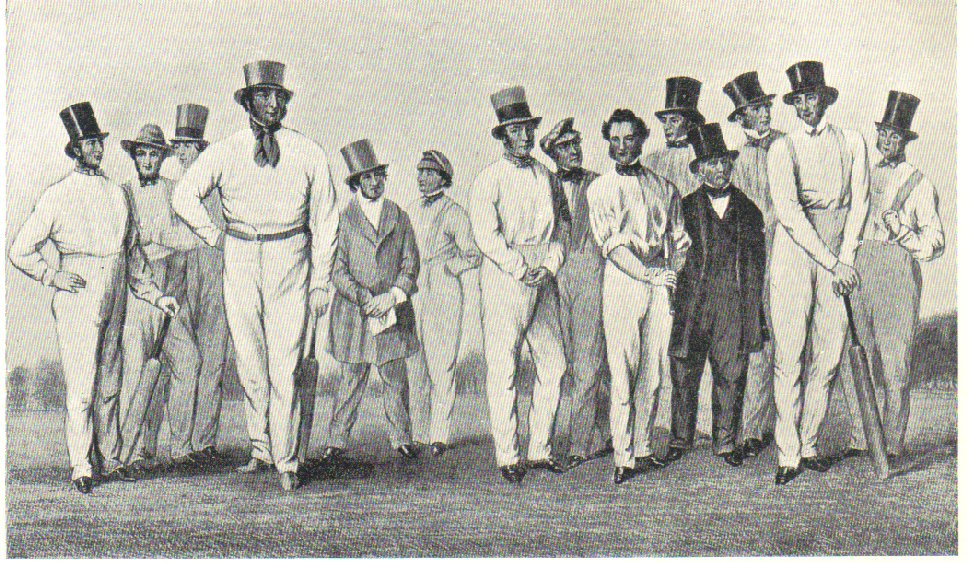
William Denison (fifth from left) and other members of William Clarke's All-England Eleven in 1847, after an original painting by Nicholas Felix.

William Denison (13 January 1801 – 9 March 1856) was involved with English cricket in the mid-19th century as a journalist, writer, administrator, and player.

A "distinguished rower" in his youth, Denison was a member of Marylebone Cricket Club (MCC), for which he appeared in several historically important matches. However, although his career spanned the years 1832 to 1847, he was only an occasional player who took part in just 8 games. As a batsman, Denison scored a mere 34 runs, with a high score of 12 and average of 3.77. He was more successful as a bowler, taking 30 wickets at an average of 12.41, with best figures of 6-72. (Note: An 1893 account of Denison's life reports that he ascribed his modest performance on the field to the combination of an elbow dislocated whilst playing the game and poor eyesight, the latter resulting not only from having had 11 operations on one eye, but also an average of 4 hours' sleep a night over a period of 26 years (for what reason it is not stated).) He was apparently the first player brave enough to bowl slow roundarm deliveries in important matches, for which he acquired the nickname "Stick 'em up" Denison.

Denison is best known for being the first Honorary Secretary of Surrey County Cricket Club when it was founded in 1845, remaining in the position until 1848. He made one appearance for the county, in their inaugural match, against MCC on 25–26 May 1846.

He was a cricket reporter for nearly 25 years, and a regular columnist for The Era newspaper in London. He wrote for The Times in the 1840s and was also on the staff of The Sporting Magazine. Between 1844 and 1847 he produced an annual publication called The Cricketer's Companion, which provided a summary of the previous season's play. (Note: Due to contemporary changes in the laws of the game, second editions of the first two volumes were printed to include the latest version of the rules.) He also wrote the book, Cricket: Sketches of the Players (1846), reflecting his involvement with the All-England Eleven team.

Denison died near Blackheath in London on 9 December 1856, it being noted in the press that he would be "[r]emembered in life for his many amiable and excellent qualities, which endeared him to a large circle of friends".

== Publications ==
- Denison, W. (1845). The Cricketer's Companion; Containing the Grand and Principal Matches of Cricket Played at Lord's and Other Grounds in the Season 1844. With, by "Special Arrangement," the Laws of Cricket, as Altered on June 2, 1845 (2nd ed.). London: Sherwood & Co.
- Denison, W. (1846). Cricket. Sketches of the Players. London: Simpkin, Marshall & Co. etc. – via Google Books.
