= Oliver Pell =

English cricketer

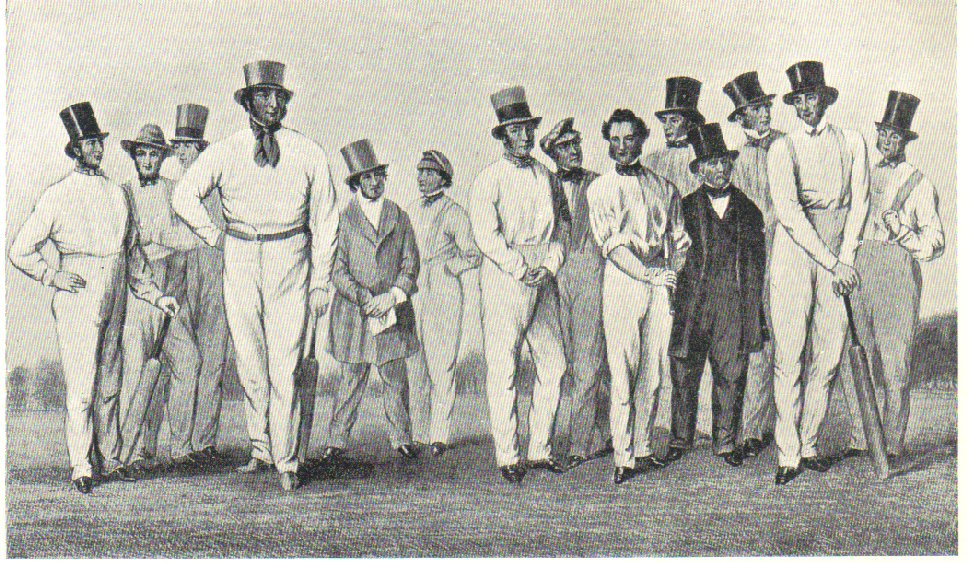
Oliver Pell (sixth from right) and other members of William Clarke's All England Eleven in 1847.

Oliver Claude Pell (born 3 September 1826 at Pinner Hill, Middlesex; died 17 October 1891 at Wilburton Manor, Ely, Cambridgeshire) was an English amateur cricketer who played from 1844 to 1848.

Oliver Pell was educated at Rugby School and Trinity College, Cambridge. A right-handed batsman who was mainly associated with Cambridge University and Marylebone Cricket Club (MCC), he made 39 known appearances. He represented the Gentlemen in the Gentlemen v Players series and was an original member of William Clarke's All England Eleven.

Pell was called to the Bar from Lincoln's Inn in 1851, and practised at the Chancery Bar. He also won prizes at Wimbledon in rifle shooting and was a member of the English VIII which defeated Scotland in 1868.

== Railway at Wilburton ==
Pell had a residence at Wilburton, west of Ely. Drainage works had improved the agricultural quality of the land, but poor transport links militated against beneficial working of the land. In 1863 Pell worked with Frederick Camps of Haddenham to generate support for an independent railway line, connecting to the existing main line at Ely. The result was a railway branch line, the Ely, Haddenham & Sutton Railway, that opened in 1866. The line was later extended and became the Ely and St Ives Railway.
