= David Eastwood (cricketer) =

English cricketer

David Eastwood (30 March 1848 – 17 May 1903) was an English first-class cricketer, who played twenty nine matches for Yorkshire County Cricket Club between 1870 and 1877.

Born in Lascelles Hall, Huddersfield, Yorkshire, England, Eastwood was a right slow round arm bowler who took twenty catches and scored 807 first-class runs, with a top score of 68, at an average of 13.22. His bowling netted 36 wickets at an average of 19.83, with best figures of 6 for 69. His first-class career lasted from 1870 to 1879.

Eastwood died in May 1903, in Sheepridge, Huddersfield, Yorkshire, aged 55.
