= George Anderson (cricketer) =

English cricketer

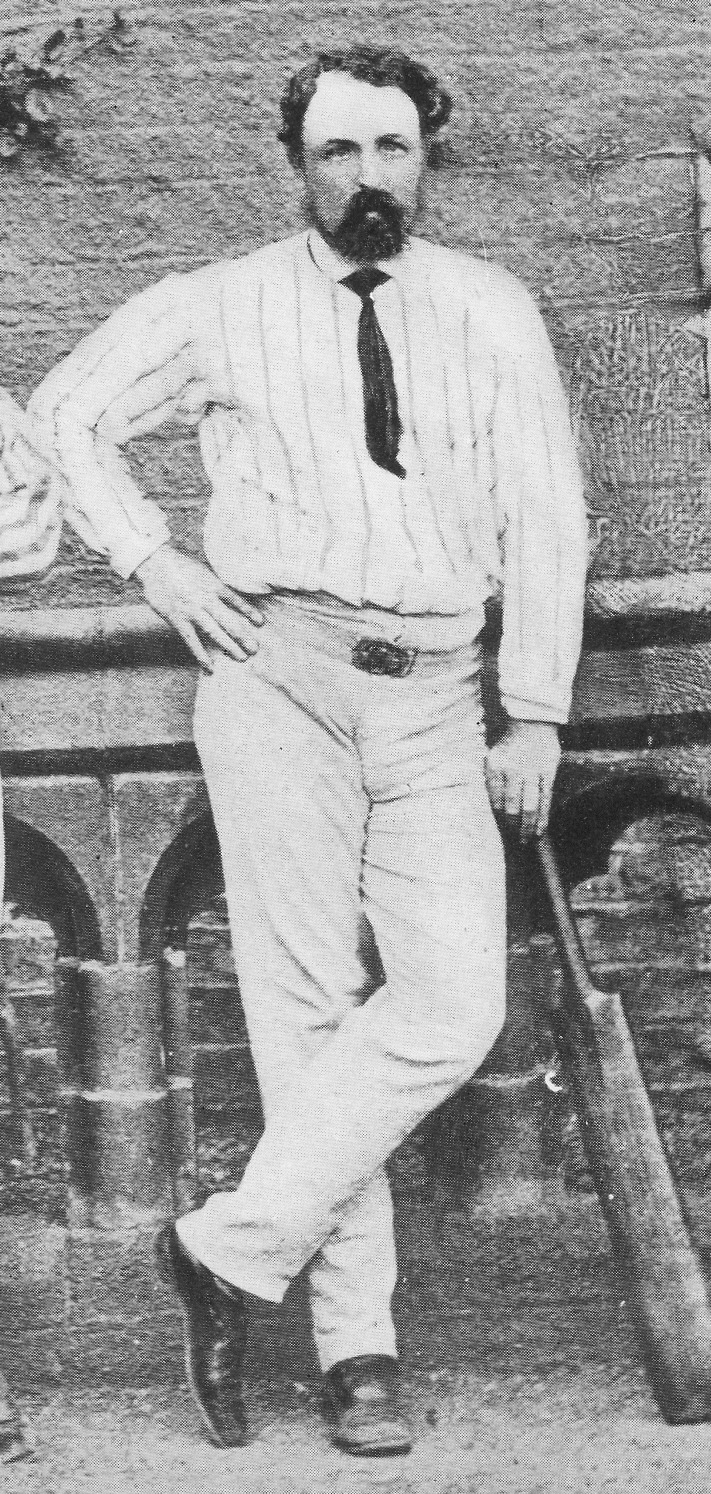

Personal information
- Born: 20 January 1826; Aiskew
- Died: 27 November 1902 (aged 76); Bedale
- Height: 6 ft 0 in (1.83 m)
- Batting: Right-handed

Domestic team information
- Years: Team
- 1850–1862: Sheffield Cricket Club
- 1863–1869: Yorkshire County Cricket Club

George Anderson (20 January 1826 – 27 November 1902) was an English cricketer, who played for Sheffield Cricket Club from 1850 to 1862 and then for Yorkshire County Cricket Club from its inception in 1863 until 1869.

== Life ==
He was born in Aiskew, Bedale, Yorkshire and showed athletic aptitude as a high and long jumper and as a cricketer. His cricket was greatly improved by the visit to Bedale of the eminent bowler William Clarke in 1848. He was employed as a clerk in his youth before making cricket his profession in early manhood.

Anderson appeared at Lord's in 1851, when he played for the North against the South, and for the Players against the Gentlemen in 1855. From 1857 until 1864 he was a member of the All England Eleven (AEE) captained by William Clarke, and George Parr. He visited Australia with Parr's team travelling on board the SS Great Britain in the winter of 1863, but met with little success. His most successful season was in 1864, when in important matches he averaged 42 runs an innings, and scored 99 not out for Yorkshire against Notts. He captained the Yorkshire team for a few seasons and in May 1869 a match was played for his benefit at Dewsbury between the AEE and the UEE.

Anderson was a right-handed batsman. He played in 99 important matches, mainly for Yorkshire teams, scoring 2,535 runs at an average of 16.35, with a highest score of 99 not out.

His style as a batsman was described as "the model of manliness"; he had a good defence, and though he took time to get set, he was in his day the hardest and cleanest hitter of the best bowling.

In 1862, he made a drive for eight runs at the Oval, when playing for the North of England against Surrey. Another hit by him off Bennett, the Kent slow bowler, was reputed to have pitched farther than any previously recorded at the Oval.

On retiring from professional cricketing, Anderson became in 1873 actuary of the Bedale Savings Bank, and held the office until the bank's failure in 1894. He died at Bedale on 27 November 1902.
