= Edwin Stephenson (cricketer) =

English cricketer

Edwin Stephenson (5 June 1832 – 5 July 1898), sometimes erroneously called Edward, was an English cricketer from 1857 to 1873. He was a wicket-keeper who played for Sheffield Cricket Club, and for Yorkshire County Cricket Club when the latter was founded in 1863.

Stephenson was born in Headford Street, Sheffield, Yorkshire, England. According to Wisden Cricketers' Almanack, Stephenson was a right-handed batsman, a wicketkeeper and an occasional right arm fast roundarm bowler. In the 1850s, he ran a tobacconist and cricket ball shop on Bramall Lane, Sheffield, which was close to the ground that became home to both Yorkshire County Cricket Club and Sheffield United Football Club.

In 1861, along with his fellow Yorkshireman Roger Iddison, Stephenson sailed to Australia on the SS Great Britain as part of the first England cricket team to visit there. On 1, 3 and 4 March 1862, he was part of The World team that defeated Surrey at Melbourne Cricket Ground by six wickets.

His swan song was as part of a winning Yorkshire team against Lancashire County Cricket Club at Bramall Lane on 1 July 1873, in front of a partisan Sheffield crowd, and alongside his long-time cricketing partner and fellow Sheffielder, Joseph Rowbotham. He finished with a tally of 803 runs at an average of 14.33. He held 30 catches and effected 27 stumpings in his 36 matches for the county club. In total, Stephenson played in 82 matches scoring 1,940 runs at 14.80, with 56 catches and 48 stumpings.

His life was filled with tragedy, losing his first wife and three children in his lifetime. Contrary to some obituary notices, Stephenson did not die at the Tuebrook Asylum for Inebriates in Liverpool. He actually died from tuberculosis in July 1898, at his home in Tuebrook, Liverpool, aged 66.

== Bibliography ==
- Haygarth, Arthur (1862–67). Scores & Biographies, Volumes 3–9 (1841–66). Lillywhite.
