= Hubert Myers =

English cricketer

Hubert Myers (2 January 1875 – 12 June 1944) was an English first-class cricketer, who played 201 games for Yorkshire County Cricket Club between 1901 and 1910. He then emigrated to Australia and played four matches for Tasmania between 1913 and 1925. He also played for the North of England (1905–1907) and The Players (1906–1908). He appeared for Yorkshire Second XI (1901–1903), Yorkshire Colts (1902), Rotherham and District (1903) and Yorkshire (1905–1910) in non first-class games.

Born in Yeadon, Yorkshire, England, Myers was a useful all-rounder, who took 303 wickets in his 210 first-class games at 25.29, with a best of 8 for 81 against Gloucestershire, when he also took ten wickets in the match. He took five wickets in a match on thirteen occasions. A right-handed batsman, he scored 4,753 runs at 18.56, with a top score of 91 against Somerset. He also took 110 catches in the field.

He emigrated to Tasmania after being dropped by Yorkshire. He played as an opening batsman and developed as a googly bowler, besides being coach to the Tasmania Cricket Association. He made a top score of 40 against the Marylebone Cricket Club (MCC) in 1924–5.

Myers died in June 1944 in Hobart, Tasmania.

== See also ==
- List of Tasmanian representative cricketers
