= Edmund Sopp =

English cricketer

Personal information
- Full name: Edmund Sopp
- Born: 22 September 1823; Petworth, Sussex, England
- Died: 1 January 1871 (aged 47); Haywards Heath, Sussex, England
- Batting: Unknown
- Bowling: Unknown

Domestic team information
- Years: Team
- 1843–1847: Sussex

Career statistics
Competition	First-class
Matches	24
Runs scored	313
Batting average	8.45
100s/50s	–/–
Top score	30
Balls bowled	708
Wickets	19
Bowling average	10.93
5 wickets in innings	–
10 wickets in match	–
Best bowling	4/16
Catches/stumpings	10/–
- Source: Cricinfo, 18 June 2012

Edmund Sopp (22 September 1823 – 1 January 1871) was an English cricketer. Sopp's was batting and bowling styles are unknown. He was born at Petworth, Sussex.

Sopp made his first-class debut for Sussex against Kent in 1843 at the Royal New Ground, Brighton. He made seventeen further first-class appearances for the county, the last of which came against the Marylebone Cricket Club in 1847 at Lord's. In his eighteen matches for Sussex, he scored 276 runs at an average of 9.20, with a high score of 30. With the ball, he took 7 wickets at a bowling average of 10.66, with best figures of 4/16. He also made five first-class appearances for Petworth, making his debut for the team against the Marylebone Cricket Club at Petworth Park New Ground in 1844. His final appearance Petworth came the following season against Hampshire. In his five matches for Petworth, he scored 37 runs at an average of 5.28, with a high score of 19. With the ball, he took 12 wickets at an average of 11.11, with best figures of 3/20. In addition to playing for the aforementioned teams, he also made a single first-class appearance for the Players against the Gentlemen in 1845.

He died at Haywards Heath, Sussex, on 1 January 1871.
