= John Bickley (cricketer) =

English cricketer

John Bickley (18 January 1819 – 15 November 1866) was an English professional cricketer who played first-class cricket between 1847 and 1860. He made 38 first-class appearances during his career, playing primarily for Nottinghamshire County Cricket Club and for various teams representing England. Bickley also played six times for The North, three times for The Players and once for each of Surrey and Kent.

Bickley was a right-handed batsman and a right-arm round-arm fast bowler. He is most notable for having taken eight wickets for seven runs in a match for All England against Kent at Lord's in 1856. He was born at Keyworth in Nottinghamshire and worked as a silk glove maker before becoming an inn keeper at the Sawyers Arms, Lister Gate in Nottingham in later life. He died at Nottingham in 1866 aged 47.

== Bibliography ==
- Carlaw, Derek (2020). Kent County Cricketers, A to Z: Part One (1806–1914) (PDF). Cardiff: ACS.
