= George Bennett (cricketer, born 1829) =

English cricketer

Personal information
- Born: 12 February 1829; Shorne Ridgeway, Kent
- Died: 16 August 1886 (aged 57); Shorne Ridgeway, Kent
- Nickname: Farmer Bennett
- Batting: Right-handed
- Bowling: Right-arm slow
- Role: All-rounder

Domestic team information
- Years: Team
- 1853–1873: Kent

Career statistics
Competition	FC
Matches	169 (Note: CricInfo and CricketArchive disagree over the number of matches Bennett played. The CricInfo total of 169 has been used here as the site is not behind a paywall. CricketArchive provides a total of 170 matches. Runs scored and wickets taken are identical for both sources.)
Runs scored	4,199
Batting average	14.73
100s/50s	1/13
Top score	100
Balls bowled	21,799* (Note: Due to incomplete scorecards from the mid-19th century, the number of balls bowled and bowling average are approximate)
Wickets	612
Bowling average	16.89*
5 wickets in innings	41
10 wickets in match	12
Best bowling	9/113
Catches/stumpings	122/–
- Source: CricInfo, 26 March 2017

George Bennett (12 February 1829 – 16 August 1886), sometimes known as Farmer Bennett, was an English professional cricketer, who played from 1853 to 1873. He was mainly associated with Kent County Cricket Club, and made more than 150 appearances in important matches.

== Life and career ==
Bennett was born in Shorne Ridgeway near Gravesend, Kent, where he was employed as a bricklayer and for 25 years at Cobham Hall by John Bligh, 6th Earl of Darnley as a cricket coach for his sons, including Edward and Ivo both of whom went on to play for Kent. He was a right-handed batsman and a right-arm slow roundarm bowler who played in 126 matches for Kent. He played for several of the representative travelling teams including the United All England Eleven (1860–1862); All England Eleven (1864) and the United South of England Eleven (1872). He represented the Players in 1865 and 1866. He was described by Lord Harris in 1907 in the History of Kent County Cricket as "one of the best all rounders Kent has produced".

Bennett took part in the first English tour of Australia as a member of HH Stephenson's XI in Australia in 1861–62. The team travelled to Australia on the SS Great Britain. During the voyage, while the team was practising on deck, one passenger received a broken nose and cut cheek when he was struck in the face by a belaying pin which Bennett was using as an improvised cricket bat. In the only important match on the tour, playing for "The World" against a "Surrey Eleven" at the Melbourne Cricket Ground in March 1862, Bennett took seven wickets in each innings and made 72 in the first innings.

He was the first player to be ever given out handled the ball. In a match for Kent against Sussex at the County Cricket Ground, Hove, in August 1872, he removed a ball that had become lodged in his clothing, and was given out before he had scored a run.

== Bibliography ==
- Carlaw, Derek (2020). Kent County Cricketers, A to Z: Part One (1806–1914) (PDF). Cardiff: ACS.
- Arthur Haygarth, Scores & Biographies, several volumes, Lillywhite, 1862–72
- Wisden Cricketers' Almanack, several volumes to 1874
