= Will Mortlock =

English cricketer

William Mortlock (18 July 1832 at Kennington, London – 23 January 1884 at Lambeth, London) was an English professional cricketer who played from 1851 to 1870. His brother Thomas was a umpire.

A right-handed batsman and slow underarm bowler who played for Surrey County Cricket Club, Mortlock made 191 known appearances. He represented the Players in the Gentlemen v Players series.

Mortlock sometimes opened the innings and he scored a total of 5528 runs at an average of 18.73 with a highest score of 106. He made three career centuries. A versatile fielder, renowned as a longstop who seldom allowed a bye, he took 85 catches. He took 147 wickets with underarm bowling at 18.02 with a best analysis of 7/42 and he twice claimed ten wickets in a match. Haygarth said his lob bowling was 'rubbish'. Mortlock participated in the first cricket tour of Australia in 1861–2. The team travelled to Australia on the SS Great Britain. It was on this tour that Mortlock gained the nickname 'Old Stonewall' for his stubborn defensive batting and longstopping.

Mortlock died at his home in Acre Lane, Brixton, on 23 January 1884, after an illness that had incapacitated him for two years. He was buried at West Norwood Cemetery.
