= George Chatterton (cricketer) =

English cricketer

George Chatterton (23 September 1821 – 1881) was an English cricketer, active 1849–61, who played for Sheffield Cricket Club (aka Yorkshire) and Marylebone Cricket Club (MCC). A right-handed batsman and occasional right-arm slow underarm bowler, he scored 1,611 runs with a highest score of 109, his only century, and took 25 wickets at 13.45, with his best return of 7 for 21 against Kent.
