= Villiers Smith =

English cricketer

Villiers Shallet Charnock Smith (30 September 1821 at Plymouth, Devon – 1 February 1871 at Rowley, Oxfordshire) was an English cleric and academic. He was an amateur cricketer who played from 1844 to 1849.

== Life ==
The second son of Charles Hervey Smith of Plymouth, he matriculated at New College, Oxford in 1843. He was a Fellow there from 1843 to 1851, graduating B.A. in 1847, and M.A. in 1851.

Smith was vicar of Husborne Crawley from 1865 until his death. His two middle names appear in some records with different spellings: the Bedfordshire County Council archives, which record his ownership of Aspley House in Aspley Guise, Bedfordshire, in the two years before his death have his names as "Villiers Shallot Chernocke Smith". On his election as "Actual Fellow" at New College, Oxford from Winchester College in 1843, The Times reported his name as "Villiers Chernocke Smith". A notice in The Times in 1869, in which he is cited as an executor in a will, mentions him as "the Reverend Villiers Shallet Chernocke Smith, of Crawley Vicarage, near Woburn, in the county of Bedford".

== Cricketer ==
A right-handed batsman who was mainly associated with Oxford University and Marylebone Cricket Club (MCC), Smith made 14 known appearances.
