= Charles Hawkins (cricketer) =

English cricketer

Charles Hawkins (20 June 1817 – 9 September 1846) was an English professional cricketer who played from 1838 to 1845.

A right-handed batsman and wicket-keeper who was mainly associated with Sussex and Marylebone Cricket Club (MCC), he made 44 known appearances. He represented the Players in the Gentlemen v Players series.

== Bibliography ==
- Haygarth, Arthur (1996) [1862]. Scores & Biographies, Volume 1 (1744–1826). Kennington: Frederick Lillywhite. ISBN 978-19-00592-23-9.
- Haygarth, Arthur (1997) [1862]. Scores & Biographies, Volume 2 (1827–1840). Kennington: Frederick Lillywhite. ISBN 978-19-00592-23-9.
