= Tom Sewell (cricketer, born 1830) =

English cricketer (1830–1871)

Thomas Sewell (15 March 1830 – 13 June 1871) was an English professional cricketer whose known career spanned the years 1851 to 1868. His father, also named Tom Sewell was also a professional cricketer.

A right-handed batsman and right arm fast roundarm bowler, he made over 150 known appearances, of which 20 were for Kent between 1856 and 1866 and over 100 were for Surrey between 1859 and 1868. He represented the Players in the Gentlemen v Players series on one occasion and, from 1860 to 1864, was a member of the United All-England Eleven (UEE). He was also a member of the team led by H. H. Stephenson on the inaugural tour of Australia in 1861–62; the team travelled on the SS Great Britain.

== Bibliography ==
- Carlaw, Derek (2020). Kent County Cricketers, A to Z: Part One (1806–1914) (PDF). Cardiff: ACS.
- Haygarth, Arthur (1996) [1862]. Scores & Biographies, Volume 1 (1744–1826). Kennington: Frederick Lillywhite. ISBN 978-19-00592-23-9.
- Haygarth, Arthur (1997) [1862]. Scores & Biographies, Volume 2 (1827–1840). Kennington: Frederick Lillywhite. ISBN 978-19-00592-23-9.
