= Tom Sewell (cricketer, born 1806) =

English cricketer (1806–1888)

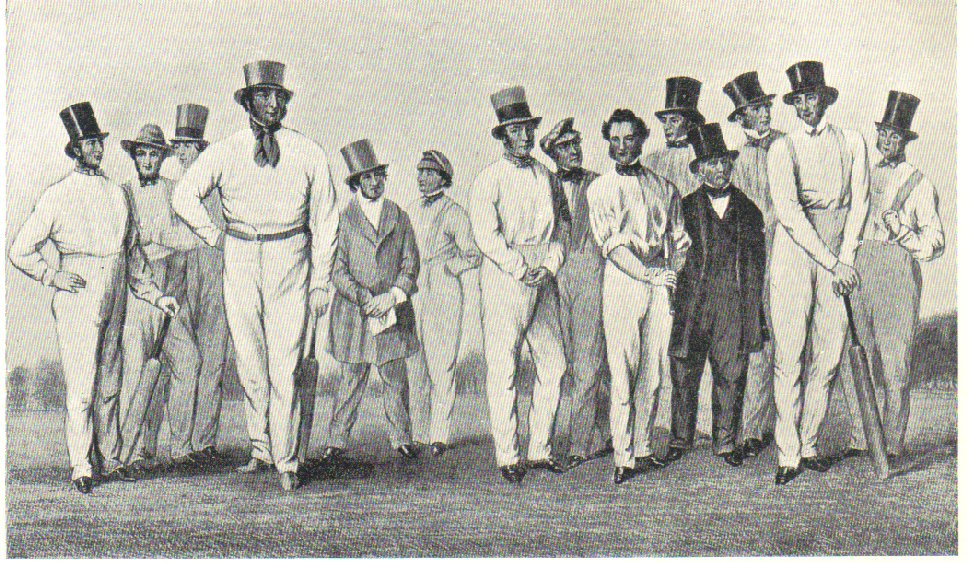
Sewell (extreme right) and other members of William Clarke's All-England Eleven in 1847.

Thomas Sewell (5 May 1806 – 1 November 1888) was an English professional cricketer whose career spanned the years 1830 to 1853. He was a right-handed batsman, occasional wicket-keeper and slow underarm bowler who was mainly associated with Surrey. He represented the Players in the Gentlemen v Players series and was an original member of William Clarke's All-England Eleven in 1846. His brother, William Sewell, played twice for Surrey, and his son, also named Tom Sewell, played for Surrey and the All-England Eleven.

== Bibliography ==
- Carlaw, Derek (2020). Kent County Cricketers, A to Z: Part One (1806–1914) (PDF). Cardiff: ACS.
- Haygarth, Arthur (1996) [1862]. Scores & Biographies, Volume 1 (1744–1826). Kennington: Frederick Lillywhite. ISBN 978-19-00592-23-9.
- Haygarth, Arthur (1997) [1862]. Scores & Biographies, Volume 2 (1827–1840). Kennington: Frederick Lillywhite. ISBN 978-19-00592-23-9.
