= William Mudie (cricketer) =

English cricketer

William Mudie (26 April 1836 – 25 January 1871) was an English professional cricketer who played from 1856 to 1868. He was a right-handed batsman and a right-arm slow underarm bowler who played mainly for Surrey County Cricket Club and made 41 known appearances.

Mudie was born at Kennington in London in 1836. He was the youngest member of the All England that toured Australia in 1861–62. He died in 1871 at Vauxhall in London.
