= George Butler (cricketer, born 1810) =

English cricketer

George Butler (20 February 1810 – 23 April 1887) was an English professional cricketer who played from 1841 to 1852. He was mainly associated with Nottinghamshire County Cricket Club and made 36 known appearances in important matches.
