= United All England Eleven =

English cricket team formed in 1852

The United All England Eleven (UEE) was an English cricket team formed in 1852 by players breaking away from William Clarke's All England Eleven (AEE). Key UEE players included John Wisden and Jemmy Dean, who became joint secretaries of the team.

The team was part of a movement in cricket that used Clarke's idea of professional teams touring the country on the newly created railways. The introduction of railways meant that, for the first time, cricket teams found that touring was feasible. Together with Clarke's team, the UEE players monopolised the best cricket talent until the rise of county cricket in the 1860s.

Clarke would have nothing to do with the UEE, but he died in 1856, and from 1857 to 1866 the matches between the AEE and the UEE were perhaps the most important contests of the English season - certainly judged by the quality of the players.

Between 1850 and 1880, 19 such teams were formed including the United North of England Eleven and the United South of England Eleven. The teams functioned by charging game organisers for their services and the organisers recouped their costs through a paying audience.

By 1859, the New York Times could say that the first English team to tour overseas was composed of players from "the two leading professional elevens of England" when a team composed of six players from both the AEE and UEE visited Canada and the USA that September.
