= Joe Guy (cricketer) =

English professional cricketer (1813–1873)

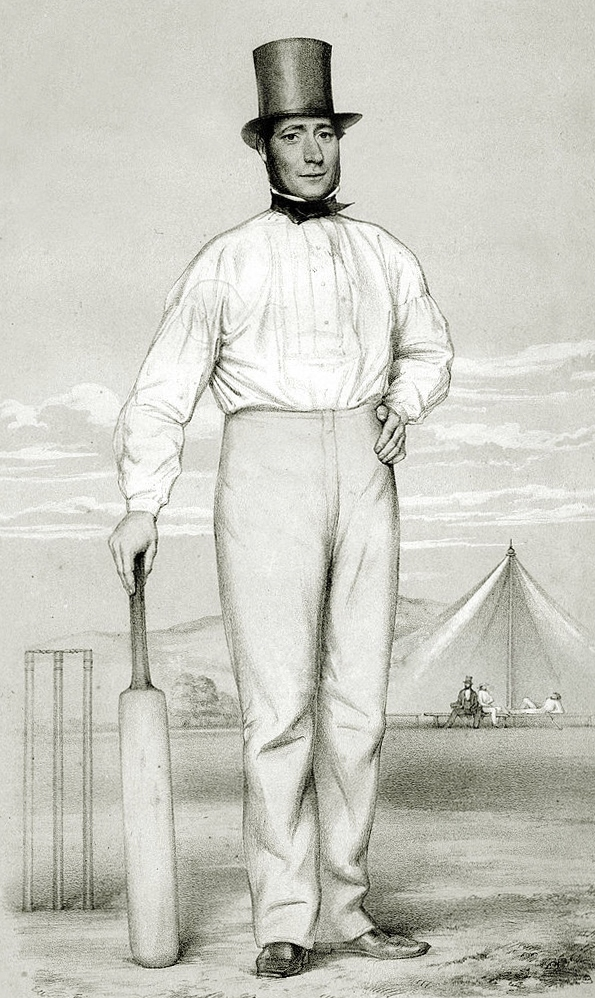

Personal information
- Full name: Joseph Guy
- Born: 30 July 1813; Nottingham, England
- Died: 15 April 1873 (aged 59); Nottingham, England
- Batting: Right-handed

Joseph Guy (30 July 1813 – 15 April 1873) was an English professional cricketer who played from 1837 to 1854.

A right-handed batsman and occasional wicket-keeper who was mainly associated with Nottinghamshire, he made 149 known appearances. He represented the Players in the Gentlemen v Players series and was an original member of William Clarke's All England Eleven. He also played for Hampshire.

Guy was a great stylist as a batsman and Clarke said of him: "Elegance, all elegance, fit to play before the Queen in her parlour."

Guy scored 3395 runs in his career at 13.41 with a top score of 98 from eight half-centuries. He took 102 catches and completed 14 stumpings.

== Bibliography ==
- Haygarth, Arthur (1996) [1862]. Scores & Biographies, Volume 1 (1744–1826). Kennington: Frederick Lillywhite. ISBN 978-19-00592-23-9.
- Haygarth, Arthur (1997) [1862]. Scores & Biographies, Volume 2 (1827–1840). Kennington: Frederick Lillywhite. ISBN 978-19-00592-23-9.
