= Roger Iddison =

English cricketer

Roger Iddison

Roger Iddison (15 September 1834 – 19 March 1890) was an English cricketer, and the original captain of Yorkshire County Cricket Club. He made seventy two first-class appearances for Yorkshire between 1855 and 1876, scoring 1,916 runs at an average of 20.60, and taking 102 wickets at 15.09.

Born in Bedale, Yorkshire, to Roger and Jane Iddison, Iddison was a right-handed batsman who also bowled right-arm underarm slow lobs. He was noted for his fielding at point.

His father was a guano merchant with a shop in Market Place, Bedale. Roger had a younger brother, William Holdsworth Iddison, who also played first-class cricket. Roger Iddison was first a butcher by trade, then kept a shop for cricket articles in Manchester (1864).

He was part of the first team of English cricketers to tour Australia. The team travelled on the SS Great Britain. Each player was paid £150.00 and guaranteed first class travelling expenses by the sponsors, Melbourne based businessmen Spiers and Pond. They played 15 matches in Australia between 1 January and 22 March 1862. He played his first match at Lord's between 9 and 11 June 1862.

In 1869, Iddison played in 27 first-class matches and made 1,059 runs. Together with George Freeman he founded the United North of England Eleven in 1869. He was the professional at Harrow School from 1871–72; and joint secretary with C D Barstow of the Yorkshire United Eleven in 1874.

He was a commission agent at York from 1870, until his death in York in 1890.

== External sources ==
- CricketArchive
- Roger Iddison Genealogy
- Iddison Family Tree
