= All England Eleven =

Itinerant English cricket team in the 19th century

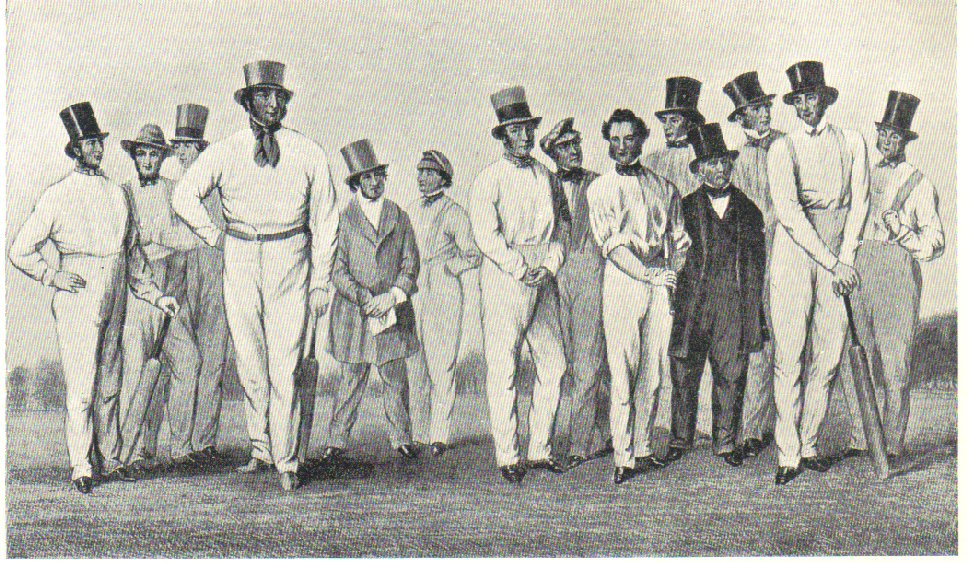
- The All England Eleven in 1847

Team information
- Established: 1846
- Last match: 1891
- Home venue: none (nomadic team)

History
- Notable players: William Clarke; George Parr; Alfred Mynn

The All England Eleven, widely known as the AEE, was an itinerant all-professional cricket team created in 1846 by Nottinghamshire bowler William Clarke. Widely known by its acronym AEE, it took advantage of opportunities offered by the newly developed railway network to play against local teams throughout Great Britain. It made its profit by receiving payments from the home clubs. The AEE teams were exceptionally strong, and so the local teams would play them in "odds" matches, usually 22 against the AEE's eleven—as such, the majority of AEE games do not have any claim to top-class standard. (Note: Any match listed in the ACS' Important Match Guide (1981) is historically important, and therefore of the highest standard, whether or not a scorecard might exist. The same applies to numerous matches discovered by researchers since 1981. For further information, see First-class cricket.)

In 1852, some players broke away from the AEE to form the United All England Eleven (UEE). Similar enterprises were launched in the following years, including the United North of England Eleven (UNEE), and Ned Willsher's United South of England Eleven (USEE), which became a showcase for W. G. Grace.

Clarke, as well as being the manager, was the captain of the AEE team until his death in 1856. He was succeeded by his Nottinghamshire colleague George Parr who agreed that the AEE and UEE should regularly play against each other, something that Clarke would not allow. Those matches were eleven-a-side and so were important from 1857 to 1863, and first-class from 1864 to the last in 1869. In 1859, the first England cricket team was formed as a composite of the AEE and the UEE to tour North America.

With the rise of county cricket and the introduction of international cricket, the travelling elevens lost influence and popularity. The AEE gradually faded from the scene, and played its last match 29–30 May 1891 against a local team in Middlesbrough.

== History ==
William Clarke in 1845.

In the late 1840s, Nottinghamshire player William Clarke recognised that a professional touring eleven could enhance the local and fragmented popularity of cricket. In 1846, he founded what would become known as the "All England Eleven" as an all-professional team that played "odds matches" in the North of England against local teams. Clarke originally called his team the "Eleven of England". The squad arguably comprised the best English professional players of the time, as well as two nominally "amateur" cricketers, Alfred Mynn and Nicholas Felix. The team for the first match, which was against Twenty of Sheffield in September 1846, was: Clarke, Mynn, Jemmy Dean, William Dorrinton, Joe Guy, Will Martingell, Tom Sewell Sr, George Butler, Villiers Smith, and William Hillyer. Commenting on this team, the ACS said that its "quality did justice to its title".

The All England Eleven was inundated with requests for fixtures. It received payment from its opponents, who in turn could hope for a large attendance. During the following years, helped by the growth of the railway network, the team regularly toured Great Britain, doing much to increase the popularity of the game in areas that had not previously seen high-class cricket. One such match was played from 22 to 24 June 1854 at a venue called Wintle's Field in Bristol, where the AEE met 22 of West Gloucestershire, and won by 149 runs. The home team included its founders, the brothers-in-law Alfred Pocock and Henry Mills Grace. Watching the game was Martha Grace, sister of the former and wife of the latter. She was with other members of the Grace family, including her five-year-old son W. G., who recorded in his Reminiscences (1899) that it was the first "great match" he ever saw.

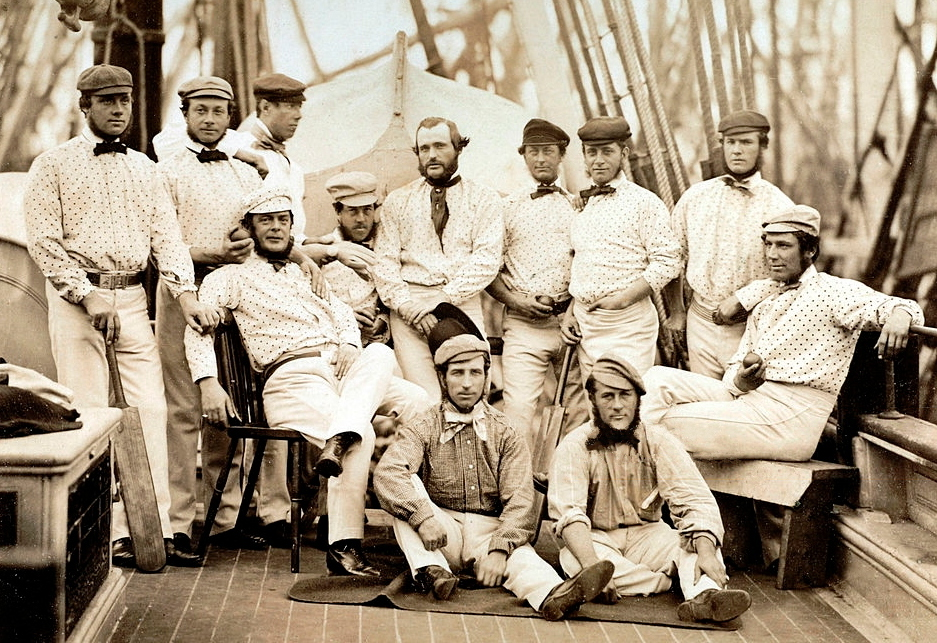
The first overseas English tour, to North America in 1859, comprised six All England Eleven players and six of the United All England Eleven.

Clarke, who was captain as well as manager of the team, was careful to pay his players more than they could get from Marylebone Cricket Club (MCC) or the county clubs (only four had been founded by 1846). However, Clarke kept by far the largest part of the profit for himself. In 1852, some of the professionals, led by John Wisden and Jemmy Dean, became dissatisfied with Clarke's ungenerous and undemocratic behaviour. Seeking increased income, they broke away from the AEE and created the United All England Eleven (UEE). Other similar teams appeared from the late 1850s.

George Parr led the AEE after Clarke's death in 1856. From 1857, the two main England Elevens played an annual match against each other. In 1859, six members of each team composed the squad of the first-ever English overseas touring team, which played several games in Canada and the United States.

== Matches ==
From 31 August 1846 to 30 May 1891, the AEE played in some 623 matches throughout the country. Among their venues were College Park, Raeburn Place, and Cardiff Arms Park, in Ireland, Scotland, and Wales respectively. In England, they played at several famous cricket grounds, such as Lord's, The Oval, Fenner's, the Hyde Park Ground, North Marine Road, Old Trafford, the Royal Brunswick Ground, and Trent Bridge. They also visited places which would become well-known names in football—these included Aston Park, Bramall Lane, Saltergate, Small Heath, Turf Moor, Upton Park, and the Victoria Ground.

The 577 matches in the miscellaneous list were all played against "odds", meaning that the AEE was handicapped by playing against teams of twenty or twenty-two. Odds matches were common in the 18th and 19th centuries, as a means of handicapping a team acknowledged to have superior strength. Even in the important/first-class matches, the AEE were often handicapped but by much lesser odds. For example, the first match in that list was against Surrey at The Oval in August 1848, and Surrey had fourteen players. The handicap paid off as Surrey won by 8 wickets, largely thanks to the efforts of Felix, Edmund Hinkly, and Will Martingell who all played for the AEE on other occasions.

The AEE's first eleven-a-side match was in May 1849 when they played the combined Cambridge University and Cambridge Town Club at Fenner's. This was a three-day match played as a benefit for F. P. Fenner, but it was impacted by bad weather, and ended as a draw.

Only a few eleven-a-side matches were played while Clarke was in charge: three against Kent, two against Surrey, and one each against Sussex and a combined Kent & Sussex team. Other matches with MCC, Hampshire, and Yorkshire were played against odds of usually 14/11. The AEE's first defeat in an eleven-a-side match was by Surrey at The Oval in June 1852. Surrey won by 7 wickets, but a curiosity of this match was that Clarke, Parr, and John Bickley all played for Surrey as given men.

George Parr assumed leadership of the AEE on Clarke's death in August 1856. Parr had no axe to grind with the UEE, and was agreeable to the annual fixture which began at Lord's on 1 June 1857, the AEE winning by 5 wickets. The teams met 19 times between then and May 1869. They won eight matches each, and there were three draws.

== Bibliography ==
- ACS (1981). A Guide to Important Cricket Matches Played in the British Isles 1709–1863. Nottingham: ACS. OCLC 85045528.
- Birley, Derek (1999). A Social History of English Cricket. London: Aurum Press. ISBN 978-18-54107-10-7 – via Internet Archive.
- Grace, W. G. (1980) [1899]. Cricketing Reminiscences and Personal Recollections. London: Hambledon Press. ISBN 978-0-9506-8820-6. Ghost-written by Arthur Porritt.
- Major, John (2007). More Than A Game. London: HarperCollins. ISBN 978-00-07183-64-7 – via Internet Archive.
