= Nicholas Felix =

English cricketer

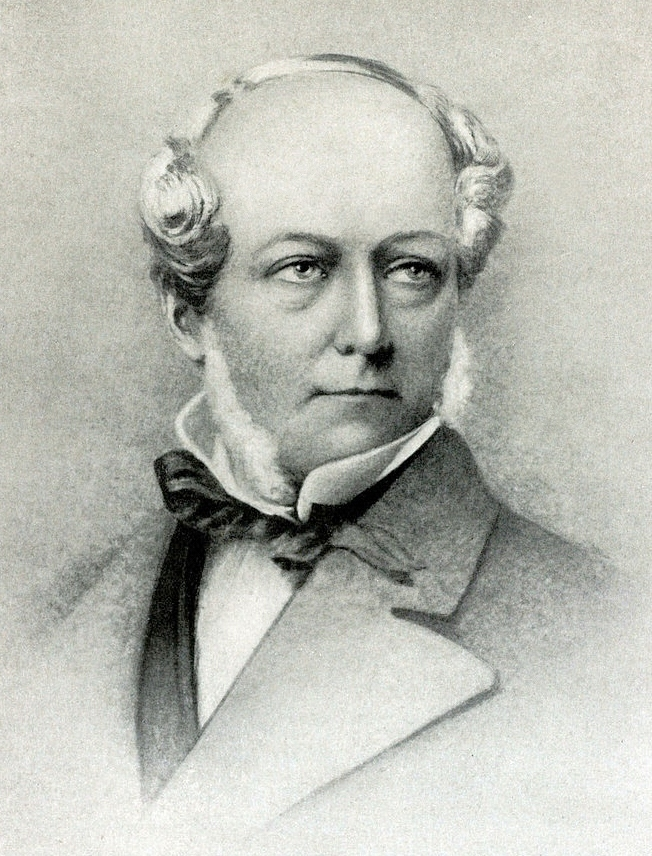

Personal information
- Full name: Nicholas Wanostrocht
- Born: 5 October 1804; Camberwell, London, England
- Died: 3 September 1876 (aged 71); Wimborne Minster, Dorset, England
- Batting: Left-handed
- Bowling: Slow left arm orthodox
- Role: Batsman

Domestic team information
- Years: Team
- 1834–1852: Kent
- 1846–1852: Surrey

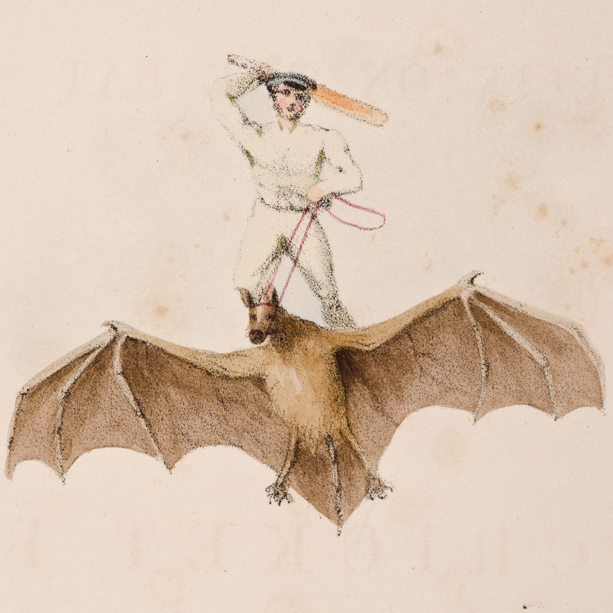
Frontispiece for Felix on the Bat by George Frederic Watts

Nicholas Wanostrocht (5 October 1804 – 3 September 1876), known as Nicholas Felix, was an English amateur "gentleman" cricketer, classical scholar, musician, linguist, inventor, writer and artist. He was one of the few players who – at his request – was routinely known by his pseudonym, Felix.

== Early life ==
When his father died in 1824 he inherited the running of a school at age nineteen. He feared that the parents of pupils might think that cricket was too frivolous a pastime for a schoolmaster so adopted his pseudonym.

== Career ==
Felix was a specialist left-handed batsman, although he occasionally bowled underarm slow left-arm orthodox. He was a mainstay of the Kent team of the mid-19th century alongside such players as Alfred Mynn, Fuller Pilch, William Hillyer and Ned Wenman. In the words of the famous elegy, best loved of Bernard Darwin,

And with five such mighty cricketers 'twas but natural to win
As Felix, Wenman, Hillyer, Fuller Pilch and Alfred Mynn.

Felix played for Kent from 1830 until 1852. He also appeared for Marylebone Cricket Club (MCC), and was a member of the All England Eleven.

Felix played in 149 matches and scored 4,556 runs with a highest score of 113. He played at a time when prevailing conditions greatly favoured bowlers and was rated highly as a batsman by his contemporaries.

He was the author of an instruction book: Felix on the Bat published in 1845. He invented the catapulta (a bowling machine), as well as India-rubber batting gloves.

== Death ==
Felix died at Wimborne Minster in Dorset and is buried in Wimborne cemetery.

== Bibliography ==
- Carlaw, Derek (2020). Kent County Cricketers, A to Z: Part One (1806–1914) (PDF). Cardiff: ACS.
- Barclays (1986). Swanton, E. W.; Plumptre, George; Woodcock, John (eds.). Barclays World of Cricket. London: HarperCollins. ISBN 978-00-02181-93-8.
