= William Hillyer =

English cricketer

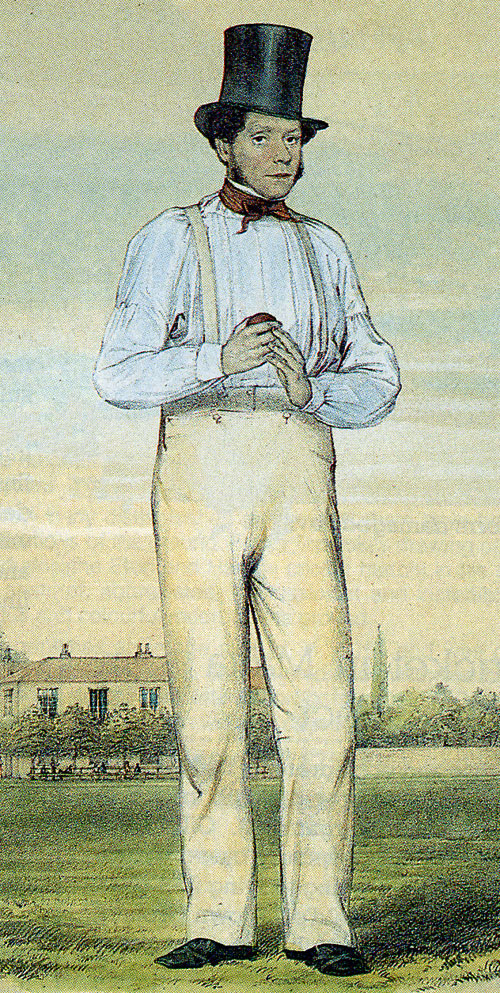

Personal information
- Born: 5 March 1813; Leybourne, Kent, England
- Died: 8 January 1861 (aged 47); Maidstone, Kent, England
- Role: Bowler

William Richard Hillyer (5 March 1813 – 8 January 1861) was a 19th-century English professional cricketer for Kent County Cricket Club, Marylebone Cricket Club (MCC), and many others before cricket was organised into regular competitions.

== Early life ==
He was born at Leybourne in Kent in 1813, the son of an innkeeper.

== Career ==
Hillyer first played for Kent in 1834 and was the "principal bowler" for county teams until 1853. He took at least 514 wickets for Kent in 89 matches – a figure which is not precise as bowling figures were not typically recorded accurately.

He first played for the Town Malling club and was employed as a professional by Marylebone Cricket Club (MCC) at Lord's between 1838 and 1851, playing regularly in Gentlemen v Players matches during the period.

At the time, scores were generally low due to the roughness of pitches, which were grazed by sheep and rolled at best with a light roller. Playing in an era when round-arm bowling had taken over from underarm, but before overarm bowling was legalised, Hillyer bowled a little above medium pace from a "shuffling run" with a simple delivery, and was difficult to score off of due to his gain of pace off the pitch, ability to make the ball come with his arm (from leg to off) and constant shooters which bowled many batsmen. He recorded at least 149 five-wicket hauls and took 10 wickets in a match at least 54 times, and 13 in at least 14 matches.

By the end of the 1830s he was established as one of England's leading bowlers. During the 1840s he was statistically unmatched. Until the days of James Southerton, no bowler matched Hillyer's wicket total of 174 in 1845 – his nearest rival, Jemmy Dean, took 100. He took the most wickets in English cricket in each season from 1842 to 1849. As a batsman Hillyer was more modest and reached 40 three times. Nonetheless, in by far his highest innings, Hillyer became the first player to accomplish the still-treasured feat of a "match double", scoring 26 and 83 and taking 13 wickets for Marylebone Cricket Club (MCC) against Oxford University in 1847.

== Later life and death ==
From 1850 onwards, Hillyer began to decline, suffering from rheumatism and, beginning in 1852, became an umpire as was normal practice with professional players of the day. He fell and broke his thumb in 1855 which forced his retirement as a cricketer. He died at Maidstone in Kent in 1861, aged 47.

== Bibliography ==
- Carlaw, Derek (2020). Kent County Cricketers, A to Z: Part One (1806–1914) (PDF). Cardiff: ACS.
