= William Clarke (cricketer, born 1798) =

English cricketer (1798–1856)

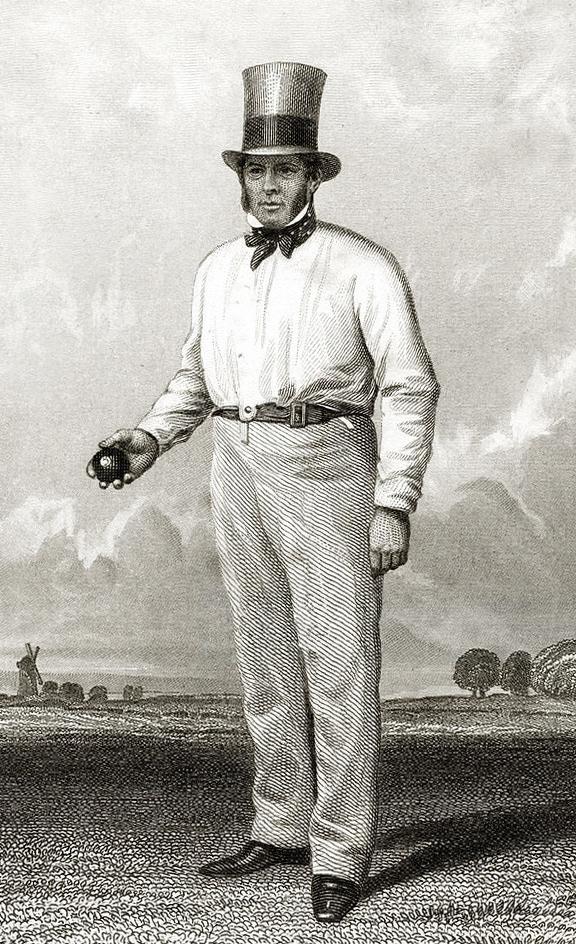

Personal information
- Born: 24 December 1798; Nottingham, England
- Died: 25 August 1856 (aged 57); Wandsworth, London, England
- Nickname: Old Clarke
- Batting: Right-handed
- Bowling: Right arm leg spin (underarm)
- Role: Bowler
- Relatives: Alfred Clarke (son)

Domestic team information
- Years: Team
- 1826–1834: Nottingham
- 1846–1853: MCC
- 1835–1855: Nottinghamshire
- 1846–1856: All England Eleven
- Source: CricketArchive, 5 November 2026

William Clarke (24 December 1798 – 25 August 1856) was an English cricketer and team manager who played from 1826 to 1855. He founded, managed, and captained the All England Eleven. He has been described as "one of certain figures who, in the history of cricket, stand like milestones along the way". Clarke was born in Nottingham, and died in Wandsworth, Surrey.

In the late 1820s, he lost sight in one eye after being struck there by a fives ball on the court behind the Bell Inn in Nottingham.

== First-class career ==
Clarke was originally a bricklayer by trade, but from his earnings as a bowler and an advantageous marriage he was able in 1837 to take up the traditional cricketer's trade of publican. He married Mary Chapman, the landlady of the Trent Bridge Inn, and they arranged for the land behind the inn to be made available. He opened the enclosed Trent Bridge cricket ground behind the inn and, from July 1840, it became the main venue for Nottinghamshire matches instead of the Forest racecourse, which was not enclosed. A stand at Trent Bridge has been named after Clarke.

Clarke was a great spin bowler. He began his career as roundarm bowling was being introduced but he decided to persist with the slow right-arm underarm leg-spin he had learned as a boy. In his career, he took 795 wickets at the outstanding average of 10.06 in 143 known important matches with a best analysis of 9/29. He took five wickets in an innings 82 times and ten wickets in a match 26 times. He was a moderate batsman, scoring 2,133 runs at an average of 10.35 with a highest score of 75. He held 55 catches.

In July 1836, Clarke played in the inaugural North v South fixture at Lord's, that being his first appearance there.

He is believed to be the only player ever to take a hat-trick that included the same batsman twice (i.e., John Fagge, the hat-trick spanning both Kent innings).

== Captaincy ==
Besides his bowling, Clarke's greatest attribute was his captaincy and leadership. He was an astute tactician and perhaps the sport's first truly tactical captain who could "think out" the opposition by means of planned field positions and rotation of his bowlers. Taking the reins from Joseph Dennis, Clarke captained the old Nottingham town club from 1830 and automatically succeeded to the captaincy of Nottinghamshire County Cricket Club when it was formed out of the town club in various stages between 1835 and 1840.

== The All England Eleven ==
In 1845, Clarke had become a ground bowler at Lord's as an MCC employee. Another ground bowler then was William Lillywhite. Clarke had a great season in 1845 and few batsmen could play him well. Although most MCC ground staff were satisfied with their pay, Clarke was not and in 1846 he decided to take matters into his own hands. In August 1846, when the MCC season finished, he formed the All England Eleven (AEE) as a touring team of leading players to play matches at big city venues, mainly in the "unfashionable but prosperous" North of England. The team played three matches in 1846 against 22 of Sheffield, 18 of Manchester and 18 of Yorkshire. Clarke's team was indeed worthy of its title and the matches in Sheffield, Manchester and Leeds were a huge success.

Clarke's touring team continued for several years to showcase the best players of the day and the venture became very profitable, especially for the entrepreneurial Clarke, who was careful to pay his players more than MCC did to keep them interested. He kept the surplus for himself and became very wealthy. John Arlott wrote of him: "He was the first man to make a fortune out of cricket; he was, also, the first to see that a fortune was to be made out of it". Because of its strength, the AEE generally played teams composed of twenty-two men, though these odds were reduced when opposed to the likes of Sheffield, Manchester, some county teams, and the rival United All England Eleven.

== Bibliography ==
- Altham, H. S.; Swanton, E. W. (1962). A History of Cricket, Volume 1 (to 1914) (5th ed.). London: George Allen & Unwin. OCLC 894274808.
- Arlott, John (1984). Arlott on Cricket. London: Harper Collins. ISBN 978-00-02180-82-5.
- Birley, Derek (1999). A Social History of English Cricket. London: Aurum Press. ISBN 978-18-54107-10-7 – via Internet Archive.

Sporting positions
Preceded by Inaugural	Nottinghamshire County cricket captain 1830–1855	Succeeded by George Parr
