= 1859 in sports =

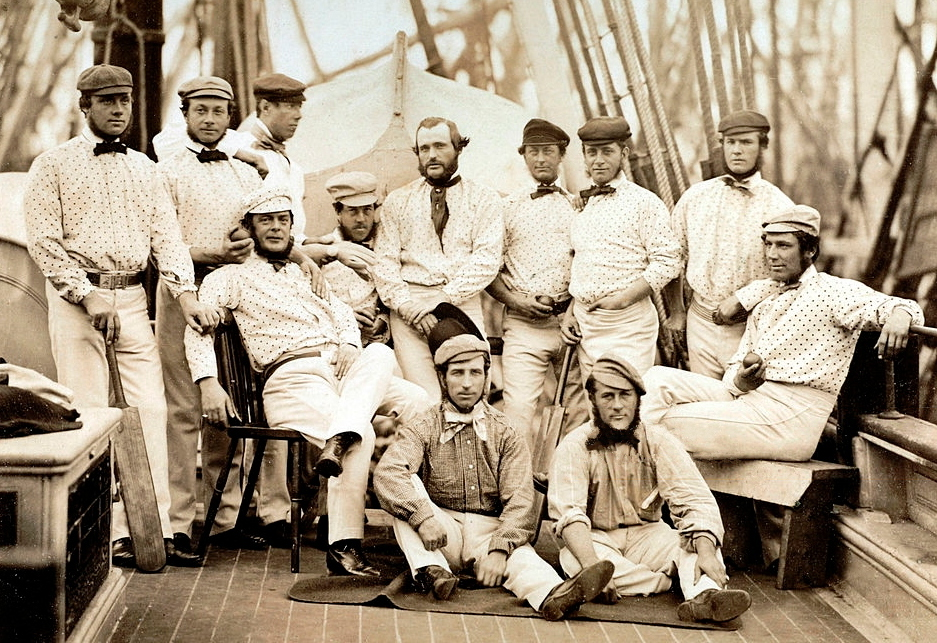
Cricket: the first English touring team pictured on board ship at Liverpool: standing at left Robert Carpenter, William Caffyn, Tom Lockyer; middle row John Wisden, H. H. Stephenson, George Parr, James Grundy, Julius Caesar, Thomas Hayward, John Jackson; front row Alfred Diver, John Lillywhite

1859 in sports describes the year's events in world sport.

== Australian rules football ==
Events

- 14 May — Melbourne Football Club is founded. The club's set of rules is the oldest surviving set in the sport
- 17 May — Australian rules football is codified
- 15 June — Castlemaine Football Club is founded
- 18 July — Geelong Football Club is founded. Some believe that Geelong's set of rules may have been written before Melbourne's, and Graeme Atkinson claims a match was played in 1858 between Melbourne and Geelong using compromised rules.

== Baseball ==
National championship

- National Association of Base Ball Players champion – Brooklyn Atlantics

Events

- A group in southern Ontario adopts the New York rules in place of the Canadian rules. The Niagara club of Buffalo, New York joins the National Association (by participating in the meeting) although it plays only locally.
- In Brooklyn, Jim Creighton moves from the local Niagara club to Star at midseason and on to Excelsior for next year, perhaps for monetary reward.

== Boxing ==
Events

- John Morrissey announces his retirement and relinquishes the Championship of America, which is awarded to his nearest challenger John C. Heenan.
- English champion Tom Sayers defends his title twice, defeating Bill Benjamin in 11 rounds and Bob Brettle in seven.

== Cricket ==
Events

- 1 March — reorganisation of Kent County Cricket Club into the present club.
- 21, 22 & 23 July — in a remarkable all-round performance, V. E. Walker of Middlesex, playing for All-England Eleven versus Surrey at The Oval, takes all ten wickets in the Surrey first innings and follows by scoring 108 in the All-England second innings, having been the not out batsman in the first with 20. He takes a further four wickets in Surrey's second innings. All-England win by 392 runs.
- 7 September — departure of cricket's first-ever touring team. The team of English professionals went to North America and played five matches, winning them all. There were no first-class fixtures. A famous photograph was taken on board ship before they sailed from Liverpool (see above).

England

- Most runs – James Grundy 530 at 17.09 (HS 67)
- Most wickets – John Jackson 83 at 11.07 (BB 8–32)

== Horse racing ==
Events

- The Queen's Plate is initiated by the Toronto Turf Club and will be run for the first time in June 1860. The Queen's Plate is run over 1 1/4 miles by 3-year-old thoroughbred horses foaled in Canada and is the oldest race for thoroughbreds in Canada.

England

- Grand National – Half Caste
- 1,000 Guineas Stakes – Mayonaise
- 2,000 Guineas Stakes – The Promised Land
- The Derby – Musjid
- The Oaks – Summerside
- St. Leger Stakes – Gamester

== Lacrosse ==
Events

- Lacrosse is elected Canada's national sport by the Parliament of Canada.

== Rowing ==
The Boat Race

- 15 April — Oxford wins the 16th Oxford and Cambridge Boat Race

Other events

- 26 July — The third Harvard–Yale Regatta (a single race) is Harvard's third win, following 1852 and 1855. Lake Quinsigamond at Worcester, Massachusetts is the third site but it will be used exclusively through 1870. The event will now be annual with occasional interruptions, primarily during major wars.

== Tennis ==
Events

- The first game of lawn tennis is played by Major Harry Gem and his friend Augurio Perera, using a croquet lawn at 8 Ampton Road in Edgbaston, Birmingham.
