= English cricket team in North America in 1859 =

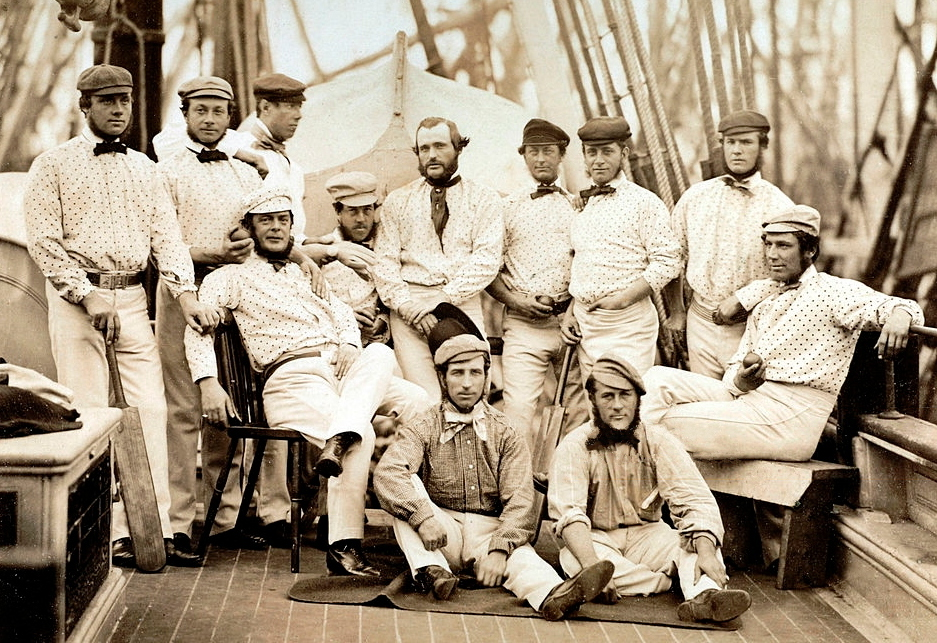
The first English touring team pictured on board ship at Liverpool: standing at left Robert Carpenter, William Caffyn, Tom Lockyer; middle row John Wisden, HH Stephenson, George Parr, James Grundy, Julius Caesar, Thomas Hayward, John Jackson; front row Alfred Diver, John Lillywhite.

The English cricket team in North America in 1859 was the first ever overseas cricket tour by an English team. The touring team is sometimes referred to as G. Parr's XI.

== Organisation ==
The idea for the tour came from William Pickering, a former player who had emigrated to Canada in 1852 and first captained Canada against the United States the following year. Together with Robert Waller from St George's Cricket Club, Pickering opened discussions for a possible tour in 1856 but financial problems meant that it was three years before the money could be raised. The English team required a guarantee of £600, which Pickering obtained through the Montreal Cricket Club, Hamilton Cricket Club and St George's Cricket Club.

== Team ==
The English team comprised six members of the All-England Eleven and six of the United All-England Eleven. With George Parr as captain, the twelve players were effectively the cream of professional talent in the 1859 English cricket season that had just ended:

Batsmen
Name	County club	Birth date	Batting style	Bowling style	Ref
G. Parr	Nottinghamshire	22 May 1826 (aged 33)	right-handed	right arm underarm	
R. P. Carpenter	Cambridgeshire	18 November 1830 (aged 28)	right-handed	none	
T. Hayward	Cambridgeshire	21 March 1835 (aged 24)	right-handed	right arm roundarm medium pace	
A. J. D. Diver	Cambridgeshire	6 July 1824 (aged 35)	right-handed	right arm underarm fast-medium pace	
J. Caesar	Surrey	25 March 1830 (aged 29)	right-handed	right arm roundarm fast	

All-rounders
Name	County club	Birth date	Batting style	Bowling style	Ref
W. Caffyn	Surrey	2 February 1828 (aged 31)	right-handed	right arm roundarm medium pace	
H. H. Stephenson	Surrey	3 May 1833 (aged 26)	right-handed	right arm roundarm fast	
J. Lillywhite	Sussex	10 November 1826 (aged 32)	right-handed	right arm roundarm fast	

Wicket-keepers
Name	County club	Birth date	Batting style	Bowling style	Ref
T. Lockyer	Surrey	1 November 1826 (aged 32)	right-handed	right arm roundarm fast-medium	

Bowlers
Name	County club	Birth date	Batting style	Bowling style	Ref
J. Grundy	Nottinghamshire	5 March 1824 (aged 35)	right-handed	right arm roundarm fast	
J. Jackson	Nottinghamshire	21 May 1833 (aged 26)	right-handed	right arm roundarm fast	
J. Wisden	Sussex	5 September 1826 (aged 33)	right-handed	right arm underarm slow	

== Matches ==
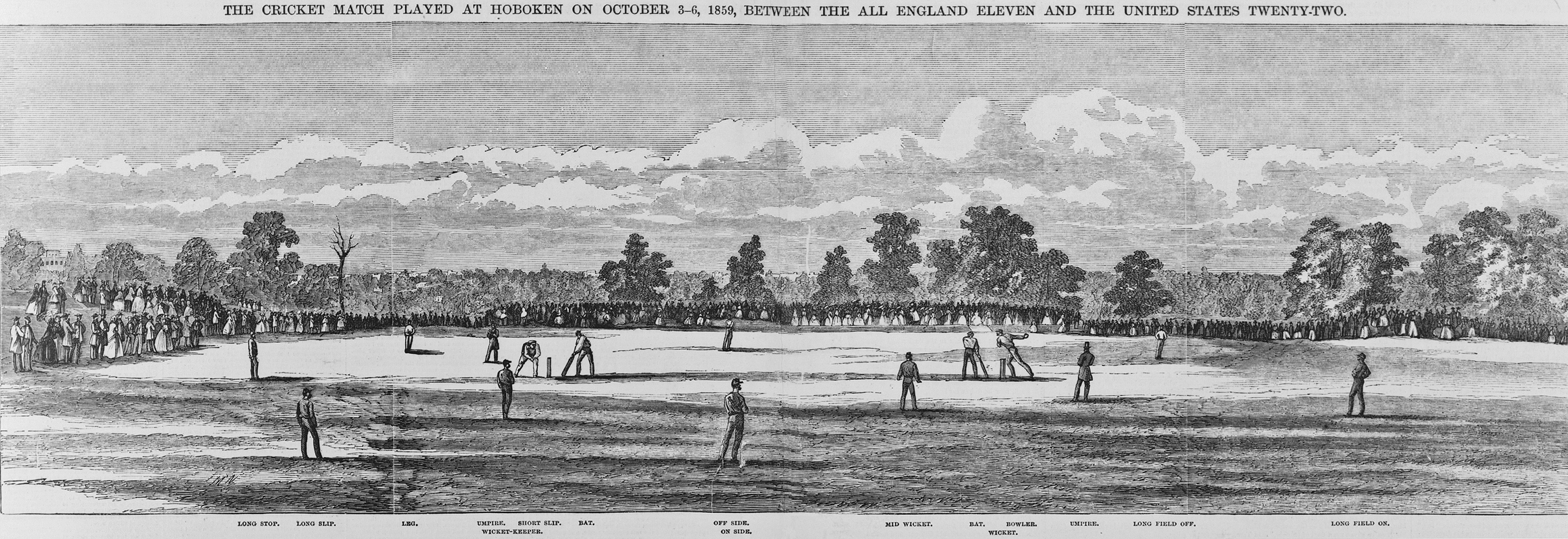
A wood engraving of the match at Hoboken, New Jersey.

Five matches were played, all against XXIIs, so none had first-class status. Three exhibition games were also played in which the 12 England players divided and added five North Americans to each team to make up eleven-a-side matches. Including travelling time, the trip lasted two months and each English player (all professionals) earned about £90, a sizeable sum at the time.

The team's opponents were:

- 22 of Lower Canada by 8 wickets at Montreal, Quebec on 26–27 September
- 22 of the United States by an innings and 64 runs at Elysian Fields, Hoboken, New Jersey on 3–5 October
- 22 of the United States by 7 wickets at Camac Woods, Philadelphia, Pennsylvania on 10–12 October
- 22 of Upper Canada by 10 wickets at Hamilton, Ontario on 17–19 October
- 22 of the United States and Canada by an innings and 68 runs at Rochester, New York on 21–25 October.

One of the exhibition matches was played 14 October at Camac Woods.

Among their opponents were Harry Wright, a future pioneer of professional baseball, and Charles H. T. Collis, future Medal of Honor winner in the American Civil War.

In addition to the exhibition matches they also had two excursions to view the Niagara Falls.

The English team was exceedingly strong and would probably have beaten any twenty-two in England. There were excellent crowds for the first three matches but the weather in mid-October turned very cold and reduced the attendances at the last two. It was reported that the fielders wore gloves and overcoats in the last match.

== Aftermath ==
A product of the tour was a book by Fred Lillywhite, who travelled as scorer, entitled The English Cricketers' Trip to Canada and the United States and published in 1860. A reprint of the book was published in 1980 with an introduction by Robin Marlar, including biographies of all of the players.
