= Tom Lockyer (cricketer) =

English cricketer

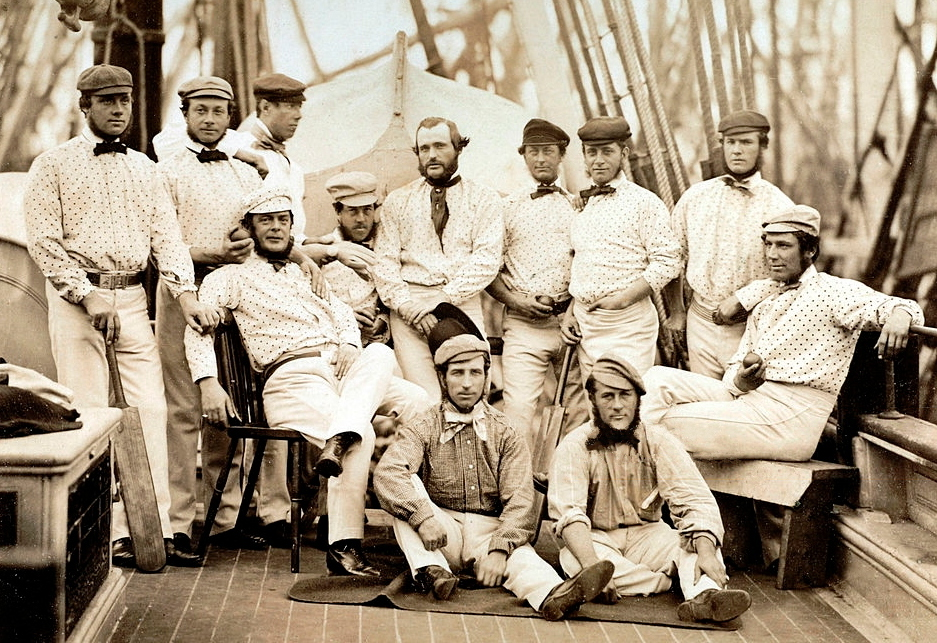
The first English touring team pictured on board ship at Liverpool: standing at left Robert Carpenter, William Caffyn, Tom Lockyer; middle row John Wisden, HH Stephenson, George Parr, James Grundy, Julius Caesar, Thomas Hayward, John Jackson; front row Alfred Diver, John Lillywhite.

Thomas Lockyer (1 November 1826 in Croydon, Surrey – 22 December 1869 in Croydon) was a famous English cricketer during the game's roundarm era. He was one of the outstanding wicket-keepers of the 19th century.

Tom Lockyer was a right-handed batsman. As well as keeping wicket, he also bowled right-arm fast-medium, roundarm, particularly in his final years with Surrey.

His career extended from the 1849 English cricket season to the 1866 season. He took 301 catches in 223 matches and made 123 stumpings. As a bowler he took 119 wickets at an average of 19.73 with a best analysis of 6/33. He took five wickets in an innings 10 times, and 10 wickets in a match once. He scored 4917 runs at an average of 15.86 with a highest score of 108 not out, which was his only century, against Nottinghamshire in 1864, when he also took 6 for 44 in the second innings after keeping wicket in the first.

At the end of the 1859 English cricket season, Lockyer was one of the 12 players who took part in cricket's first-ever overseas tour when an English cricket team led by George Parr visited North America. He was also a member of Parr's team that toured Australia and New Zealand in 1863–64. During this trip the team sailed on the SS Great Britain.
