= English cricket team in Australia and New Zealand in 1863–64 =

An England cricket team toured Australia and New Zealand in the 1863–64 season. This was the second tour of Australia by an English team, the first having been in 1861–62, and the first to visit New Zealand. Like the 1859 team in North America, this team is sometimes referred to as G. Parr's XI.

== Squad ==
The team was captained by George Parr (Nottinghamshire) who was joined by William Caffyn, Julius Caesar, Tom Lockyer, (all Surrey); Alfred Clarke, Cris Tinley, John Jackson (all Nottinghamshire); George Tarrant, Robert Carpenter, Thomas Hayward (all Cambridgeshire); George Anderson (Yorkshire); and E. M. Grace (amateur; West Gloucestershire CC). Grace was the sole amateur in the party, all the other players being professionals.

== Tour ==
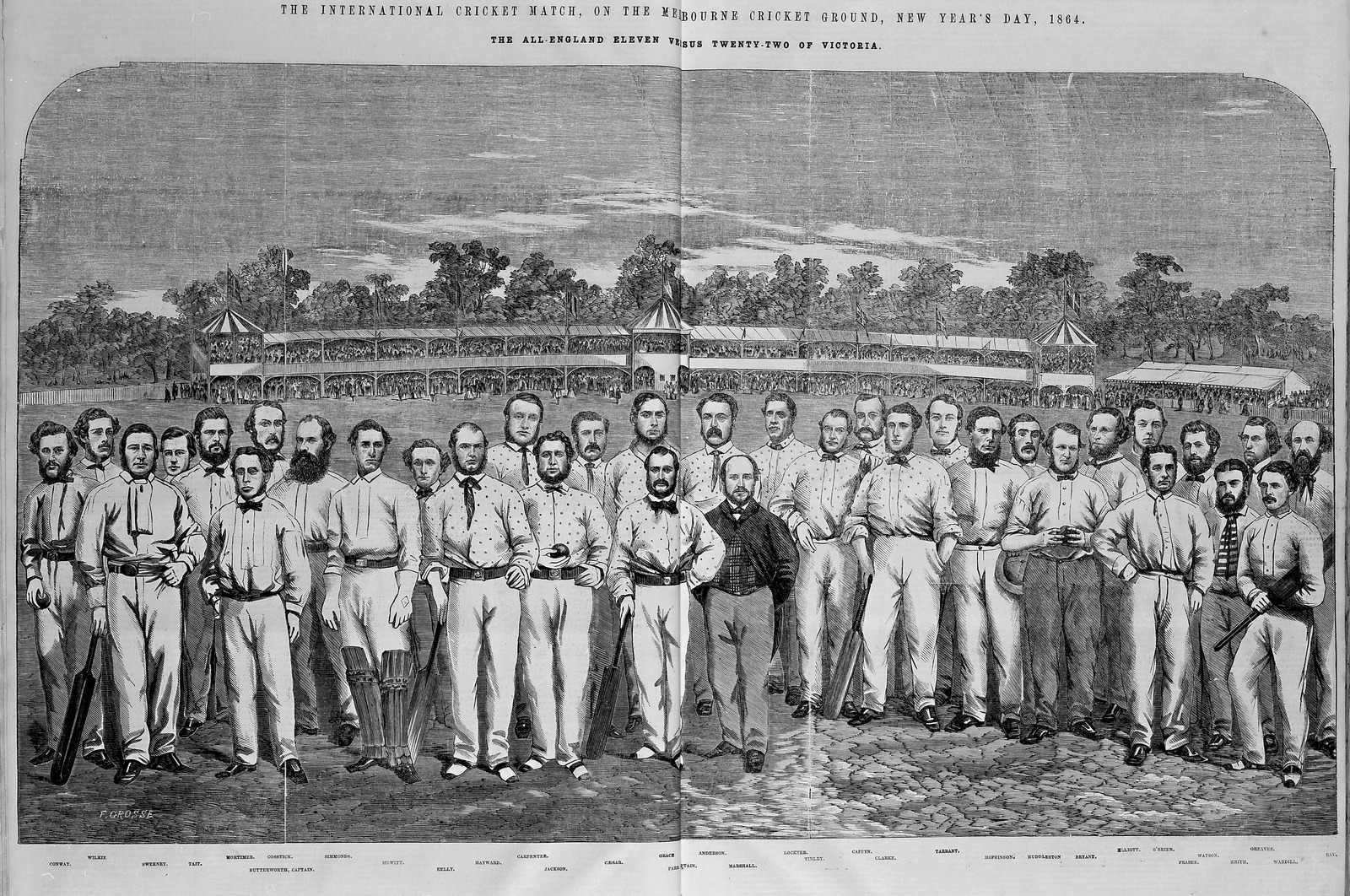
The All England 11 in Australia 1864, State Library Victoria

The first match started on 1 January 1864 at the Melbourne Cricket Ground and the last ended on 24 April, also at the MCG. Parr's team played 14 matches in Victoria and New South Wales but only one is recognised as a first-class fixture. They also played five matches in the South Island of New Zealand during February.

The first-class match was held at the MCG in March. The two teams combined the tourists and local players on each side: in a close match G. Anderson's XI beat G. Parr's XI by four wickets.
