= John Lillywhite =

English cricketer and umpire

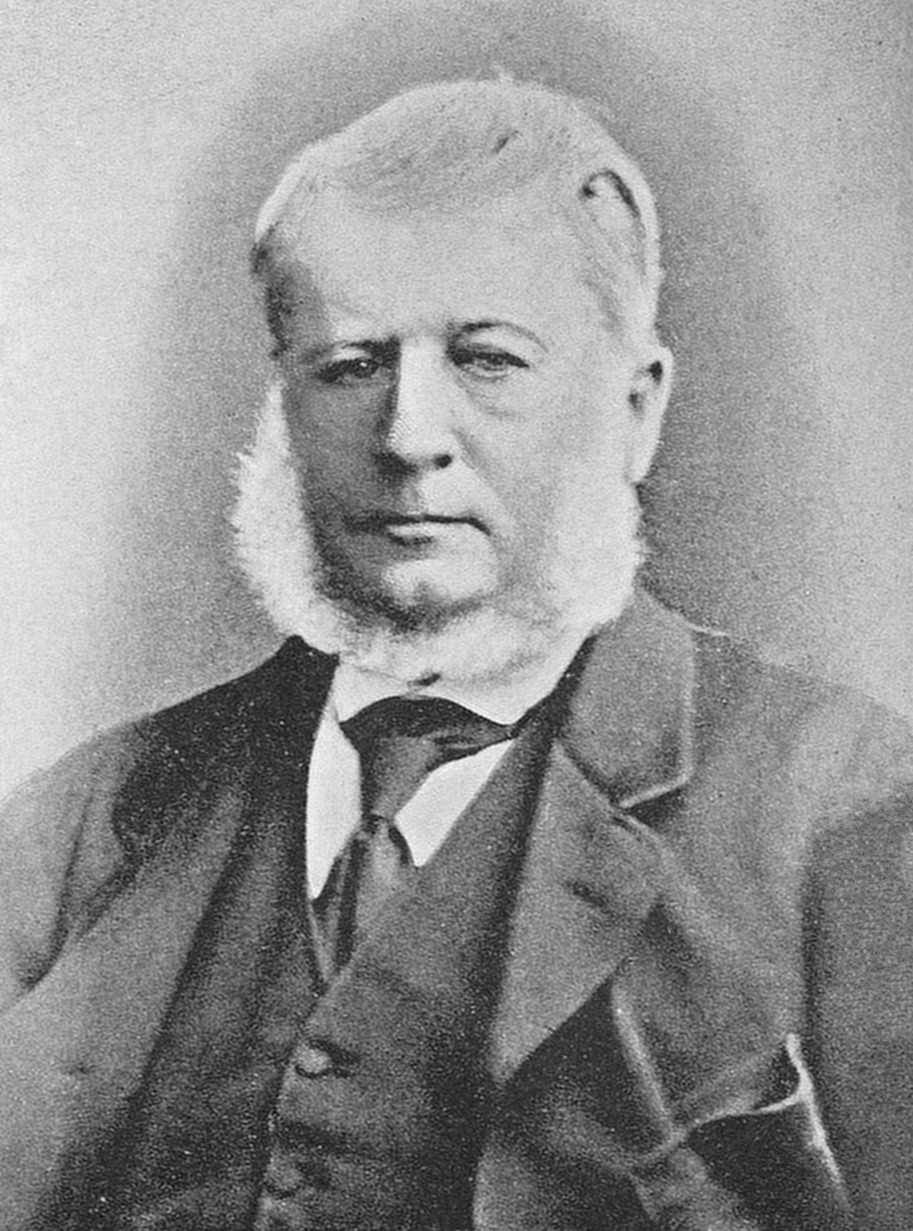

Personal information
- Born: 10 November 1826; Hove, Sussex, England
- Died: 27 October 1874 (aged 47); St Pancras, London, England
- Batting: Right-handed
- Bowling: Right-arm fast
- Relatives: William Lillywhite (father); Fred Lillywhite (brother); James Lillywhite (cousin)

Domestic team information
- Years: Team
- 1850–1869: Sussex
- 1851–1864: Middlesex
- 1856–1860: Marylebone Cricket Club (MCC)

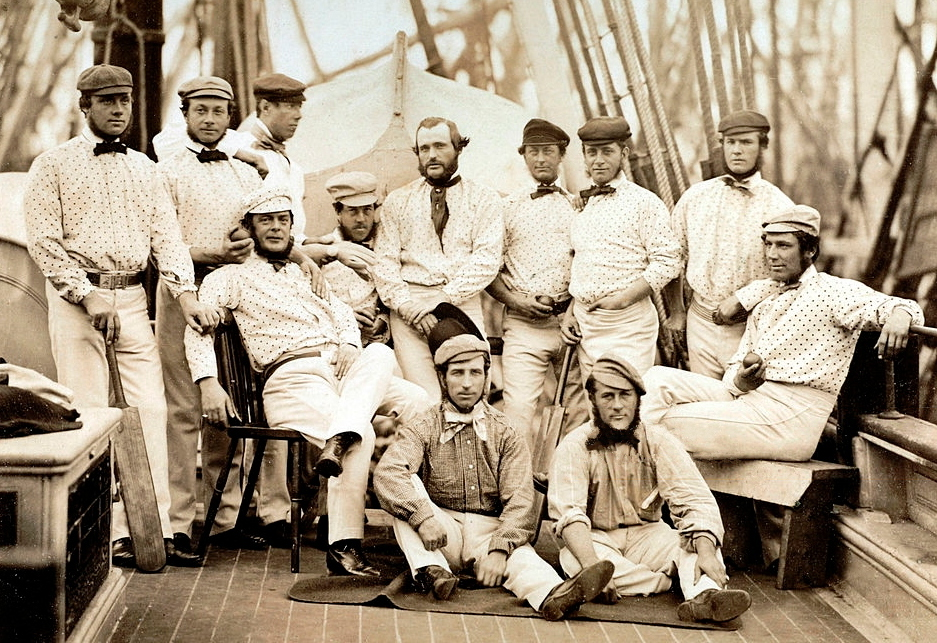
The first English touring team pictured on board ship at Liverpool: standing at left Robert Carpenter, William Caffyn, Tom Lockyer; middle row John Wisden, HH Stephenson, George Parr, James Grundy, Julius Caesar, Thomas Hayward, John Jackson; front row Alfred Diver, John Lillywhite

John Lillywhite (10 November 1826 – 27 October 1874) was an English cricketer and umpire during the game's roundarm era.

John Lillywhite was part of a famous cricketing family, with his father, William Lillywhite, brother, Fred Lillywhite, and cousin, James Lillywhite all playing the sport. In 1863, members of the family established the sports outfitters Lillywhites.

Lillywhite was an all-rounder who batted right-handed and bowled right-arm roundarm, both slow and fast. He played between 1848 and 1873, taking 223 wickets in 185 matches at a bowling average of 11.56 and a best analysis of 8/54. He took five wickets in an innings 12 times and 10 wickets in a match twice. He scored 5,127 runs at a batting average of 17.43 with a highest score of 138 and two centuries. He took 94 catches.

At the end of the 1859 English cricket season, Lillywhite was one of the 12 players who took part in cricket's first overseas tour when an English team led by George Parr visited North America.

From 1856 to 1873, Lillywhite umpired in 29 matches. In 1862, during an All England Eleven v. Surrey match at The Oval, Lillywhite no-balled Edgar Willsher six times in succession for what he deemed to be illegal "high" deliveries. Willsher and the majority of his England teammates protested and abandoned the match, and Lillywhite was replaced the following day. The incident provoked much discussion and resulted in the laws of cricket being change to allow overarm bowling from the beginning of the 1864 season.

He also competed in Cornish wrestling tournaments in the mid-1800s.

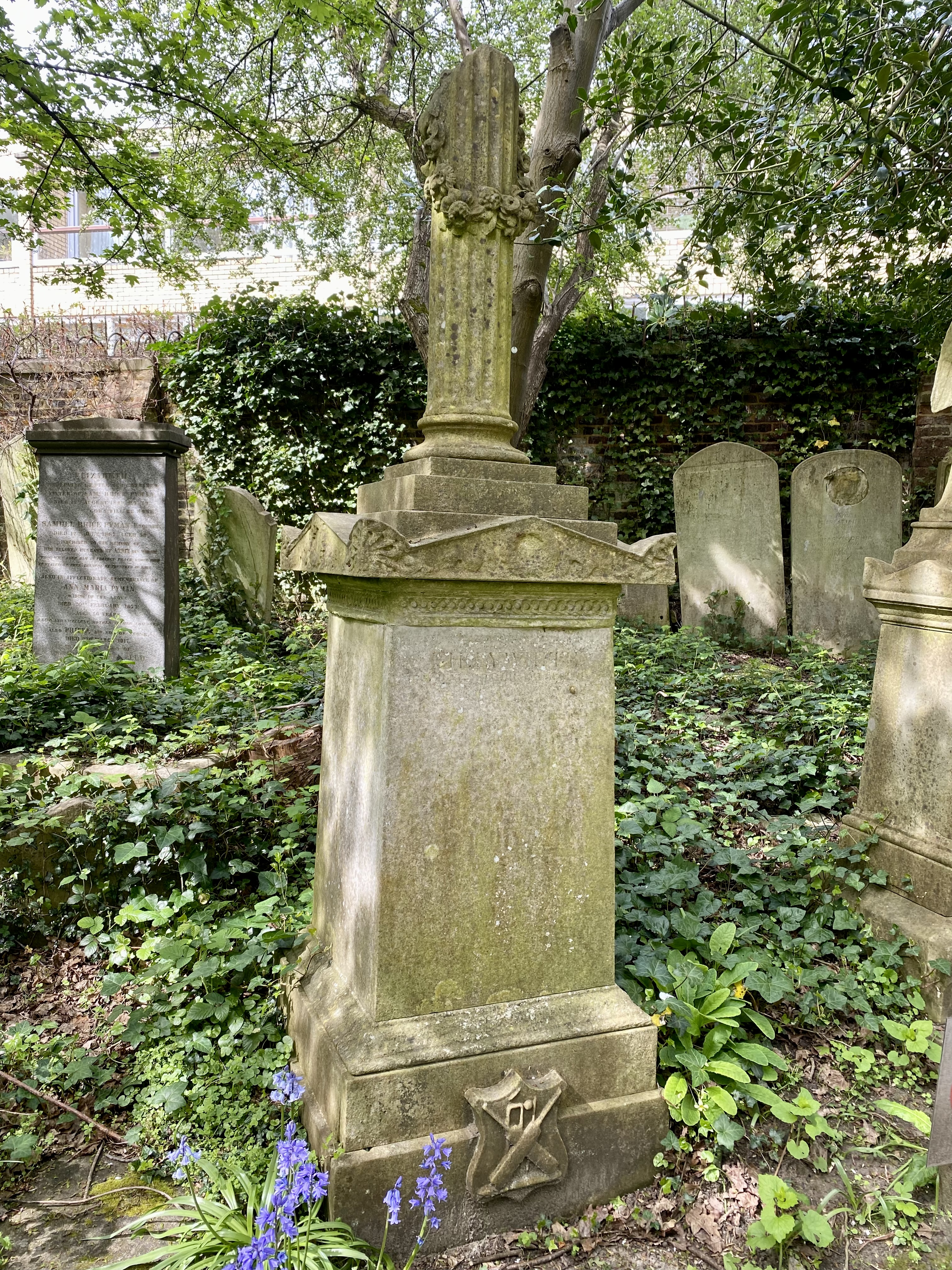
Lillywhite's grave at Highgate Cemetery

He died aged 47, after a lingering illness, at his residence in Seymour Street, Euston Square, on Tuesday 27 October 1874, and was buried at Highgate Cemetery on 31 October 1874.
