= Fred Lillywhite =

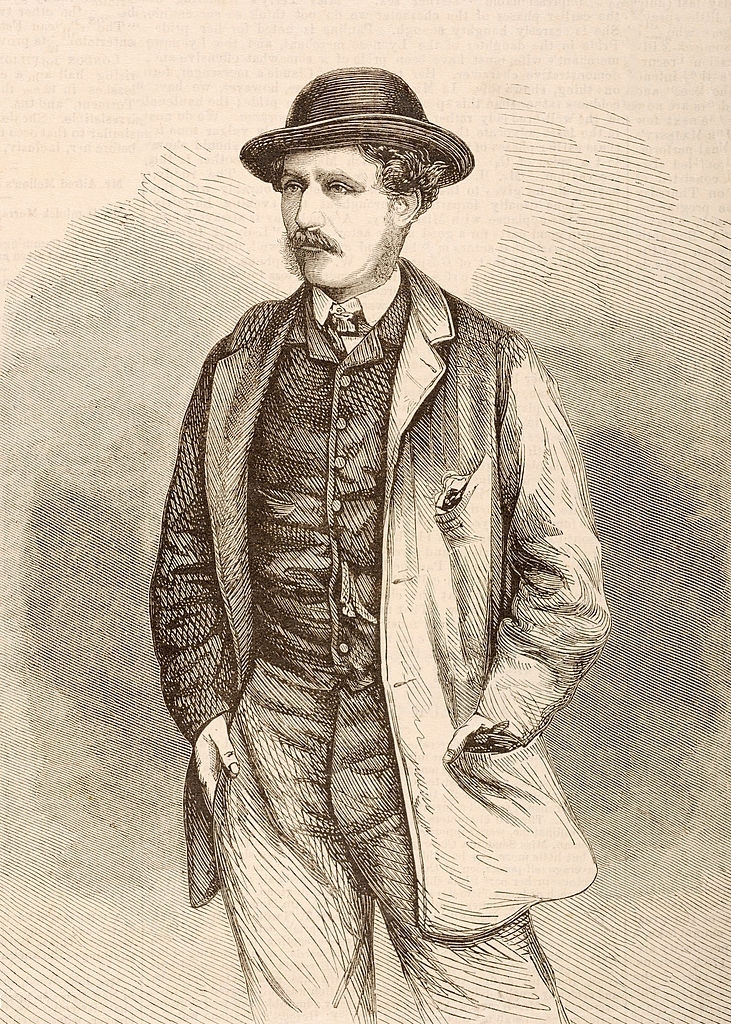
Fred Lillywhite

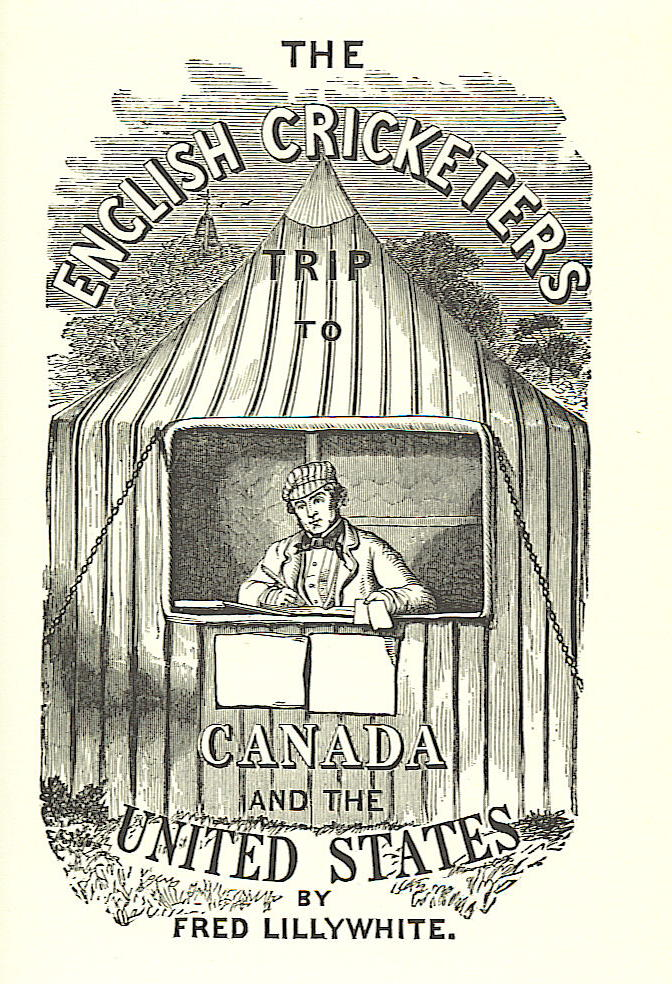
Fred Lillywhite in his tent (The English Cricketers' Trip to Canada and the United States in 1859)

Frederick Lillywhite (7 July 1829 – 15 September 1866) was a sports outfitter and cricketing entrepreneur, who organised the first overseas cricket tour by an English team and published a number of reference works about cricket.

== Cricketing dynasty ==
Lillywhite was born in Hove, Sussex on 7 July 1829. He was the third son of (Frederick) William Lillywhite (1792–1854), the Sussex bowler known as the "Nonpareil" ("unrivalled"); younger brother of the batsman and umpire John Lillywhite (1826–74); and cousin of James Lillywhite (1842–1929) who captained England in the first Test match played against Australia in Melbourne in 1877.

== Early business activities ==
Fred and John Lillywhite, as well as their elder brother, James (b. 1825), all went into business as sports outfitters. Perhaps because of this multiplicity of Lillywhites, latter day accounts of their non-cricketing activities sometimes conflict as to who did what. What is clear is that Fred was a manager, probably from 1848 to 1855, in the firm of Lillywhite Brothers, a tobacconist and sports outfitter in Islington, then on the outskirts of London.

The Lillywhites' father died in 1854 and was buried in Highgate Cemetery, North London. The following year Fred went into partnership with the Sussex all-rounder, John Wisden (1826–1884), with whom he established a tobacconist and outfitter in New Coventry Street, near Leicester Square, in the West End of London. This partnership did not survive the tour to the United States and Canada in 1859 that Lillywhite (though not himself a player) organised and of which Wisden was a prominent member.

By 1860 James Lilywhite (the elder brother) was cricketing coach at Cheltenham College, Gloucestershire, where he also ran an outfitters. John Lillywhite, who had also joined the 1859 tour, was then running a cricketing warehouse near Euston Square, London. This was the forerunner of the present Lillywhites, established in Haymarket in 1863, that, following its acquisition in 1922 by I H Benedictus, moved to the Criterion site in Piccadilly Circus in 1925.

== The Guide to Cricketers ==
In 1848 (still not 20) Fred Lillywhite had produced the first edition of his The Guide to Cricketers (known popularly as "Fred's Guide") which was published until the year of his death in 1866. This was, in many respects, the forerunner of Wisden Cricketers' Almanack, founded by John Wisden in 1864, which has since been published annually, reaching its 100th edition in 1963 and 150th in 2013. From 1867 "Fred's Guide" was incorporated in James Lillywhite's Cricketers' Companion (first published in 1865 and known as the "Green Lily") which continued in that form until 1880.

In 1865 the Marylebone Cricket Club withdrew its support for Lillywhite's Guide. This falling out with the cricketing establishment seems to have arisen from the trenchancy of some of Lillywhite's observations. Significantly, in 1866, Wisden noted that "John Wisden & Co have avoided making remarks upon the play or players".

In the 1865 edition Lillywhite proposed that the standard height of the wicket should be raised from 27 inches to "28, 29, or even 30 inches out of the ground" to help avoid what he regarded as excessively high scores. This recommendation was implemented over sixty years later, in 1931, when the height was increased by an inch and the stumps were also widened.

== Tour of the US and Canada (1859) ==
The touring party of 1859 left Liverpool on the SS Nova Scotian on 7 September and returned on 11 November. Its members, in addition to Wisden and John Lillywhite, were the captain George Parr (1826–91), Julius Caesar (1830–78), William Caffyn (1828–1919), Robert Carpenter (1830–1901), Alfred Diver (1824–1876), James Grundy (1824–1873), Tom Hayward (1835–76), John Jackson (1833–1910), Tom Lockyer (1826–1869) and H. H. Stephenson (1833–1896), who later led the first private tour by an England XI to Australia in 1861.

Fred Lillywhite travelled with his groundside tent and printing press. His role on the tour has been described as that of "scorer, reporter, and mentor, not to say Nestor".

The team won all five official matches against a 22 of Lower Canada (by 8 wickets at Montreal, Quebec on 26–27 September), a 22 of the United States (by an innings and 64 runs at Hoboken, NJ on 3–5 October), a different 22 of the United States (by 7 wickets at Philadelphia on 10–12 October), a 22 of Lower Canada (by 10 wickets at Hamilton, Ontario on 17–19 October) and a further 22 of the United States (by an innings and 68 runs at Rochester, NY on 21–25 October).

There were also some exhibition matches and an impromptu game of baseball when a match in New York was interrupted by snow. The team made two excursions to view the Niagara Falls.

Lillywhite's detailed account of the tour, The English Cricketers' Trip to Canada and the United States, was published in 1860 and reprinted over a century later, in 1980. There was coverage also in the 13th edition of his Guide to Cricketers and Caffyn gave an account in a memoir, Seventy-one Not Out, published at the end of the century.

== Final years ==
After his break with Wisden, Lillywhite was based at the Kennington Oval, home of Surrey County Cricket Club, from where, in 1862, he published Scores and Biographies, a major reference work about cricket since 1772. He published also various scoring books and sheets, as well as scorecards of matches.

Lillywhite died at Brighton on 15 September 1866 at the age of 37.
