= 1852 in sports =

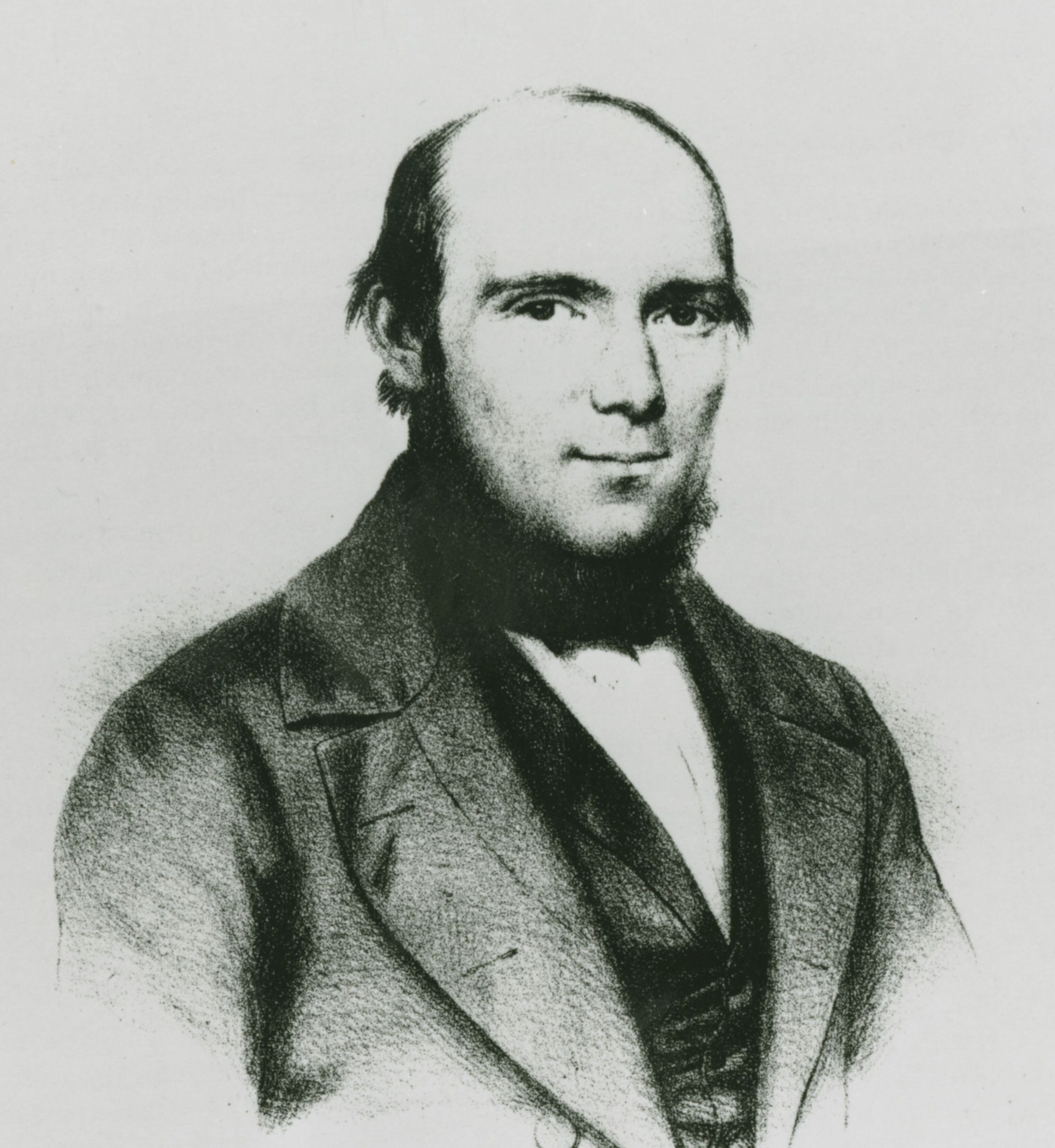

1852 in sports describes the year's events in world sport.

== Boxing ==
Events

- 21 August — John Morrissey defeats George Thompson in the 11th round at Mare Island, California and claims the Heavyweight Championship of America, which has been vacated by the now-retired Tom Hyer. His claim is not generally recognised at this time because of the prior claim by Yankee Sullivan, who fought Hyer in 1849.
- Harry Broome retains the Championship of England but there is no record of any fights involving him in 1852.

== Chess ==
Events

- Adolf Anderssen and Jean Dufresne play the Evergreen Game in Berlin. Like Anderssen's Immortal Game of the previous year, it is an informal game.

== Cricket ==
Events

- The United All England Eleven (UEE) is established as a rival to William Clarke's All-England Eleven (AEE). Jemmy Dean and John Wisden are the main organisers. Other players representing the UEE in its early years include John Lillywhite, Tom Lockyer, James Grundy, Frederick Miller, Will Mortlock and Tom Sherman.
- 27 July — John Sherman makes his final first-class appearance for Manchester v. Sheffield at Hyde Park Ground, Sheffield. His career has spanned a record 44 seasons from his debut at Lord's on 20 September 1809 when he played for Beauclerk's XI v. Ladbroke's XI.

England

- Most runs – Nicholas Felix 529 @ 18.24 (HS 70)
- Most wickets – James Grundy 103 @ 8.83 (BB 7–?)

== Horse racing ==
England

- Grand National – Miss Mowbray
- 1,000 Guineas Stakes – Kate
- 2,000 Guineas Stakes – Stockwell
- The Derby – Daniel O'Rourke
- The Oaks – Songstress
- St. Leger Stakes – Stockwell

== Rowing ==
The Boat Race

- 3 April — Oxford wins the 11th Oxford and Cambridge Boat Race, a revival of the race last contested in 1849

Other events

- 3 August — The first Harvard–Yale Regatta is a 2-length win for Harvard in a single eight-oar, two-mile race on Lake Winnipesaukee, New Hampshire. The Yale club initiated this Race, and the next one in 1855, by challenge to the Harvard club.
