= 1859 English cricket season =

Cricket season review

The 1859 English cricket season was the 33rd of the roundarm era. (Note: Any match listed in the ACS' Important Match Guide (1981) is historically important, and therefore of the highest standard, whether or not a scorecard might exist. The same applies to numerous matches discovered by researchers since 1981. For further information, see First-class cricket.) The highlight was one of the sport's most remarkable all-round performances by V. E. Walker.

== Important matches ==
- 1859 match list

== Events ==
- 1 March. Formation of the present Kent CCC.
- 21 to 23 July. V E Walker of Middlesex, playing for England versus Surrey at The Oval, took all ten wickets in the Surrey first innings and followed by scoring 108 in the England second innings, having been the not out batsman in the first (20*). He took a further four wickets in Surrey's second innings. England won by 392 runs.

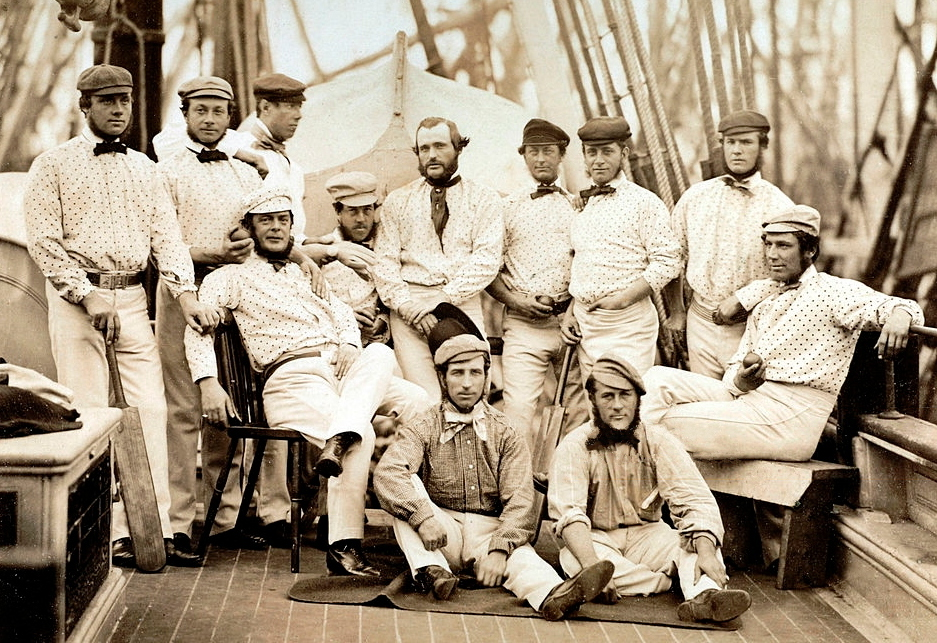
The first English touring team pictured on board ship at Liverpool: standing at left Robert Carpenter, William Caffyn, Tom Lockyer; middle row John Wisden, HH Stephenson, George Parr, James Grundy, Julius Caesar, Thomas Hayward, John Jackson; front row Alfred Diver, John Lillywhite.

- 7 September. Departure of cricket's first-ever touring team. A famous photograph was taken on board ship before they sailed from Liverpool. The team of English professionals went to North America and played five matches, winning them all. The 12-man squad was:

George Parr (captain)
James Grundy
John Jackson (all of Nottinghamshire);
Robert Carpenter
Alfred Diver
Thomas Hayward (all of Cambridgeshire);
Julius Caesar
William Caffyn
Tom Lockyer
HH Stephenson (all of Surrey);
John Lillywhite
John Wisden (both of Sussex)

- See also : English cricket team in North America in 1859

== Leading batsmen ==
James Grundy was the leading runscorer with 530 @ 17.09

Other leading batsmen were: FP Miller, Tom Lockyer, V E Walker, John Lillywhite, William Caffyn, John Wisden, JH Hale, Thomas Hayward, HH Stephenson

== Leading bowlers ==
John Jackson was the leading wicket-taker with 83

Other leading bowlers were: V E Walker, Edgar Willsher, William Caffyn, James Grundy, HH Stephenson, John Wisden

== Bibliography ==
- ACS (1981). A Guide to Important Cricket Matches Played in the British Isles 1709–1863. Nottingham: ACS. OCLC 85045528.
- Warner, Pelham (1946). Lords: 1787–1945. London: Harrap. OCLC 877106024.
