= 1869 English cricket season =

Cricket season review

The 1869 English cricket season was the sixth since the legalisation of overarm bowling. The original Cambridgeshire County Cricket Club was dissolved, though a team called Cambridgeshire played in a specially arranged match in July. The prolonged schism between the northern and southern professionals was finally brought to an end, and was marked by the resumption of the North v South fixture.

== Cambridgeshire ==
According to the 1870 edition of Green Lilly, the original Cambridgeshire County Cricket Club was dissolved in 1869, and it has been said that the reason was "a lack of available amateurs". Cambridgeshire had a trio of famous players in Robert Carpenter, Tom Hayward Sr, and George Tarrant, but they were short of other good players. The club also lacked patronage and membership, leaving it unable to gain sufficient income to counter a rising debt which became unpayable.

A team called Cambridgeshire did play a match against Yorkshire in 1869, and another in 1871 against Surrey. After that, however, Cambridgeshire ceased to be a first-class team.

The 1869 match against Yorkshire took place in Hunslet on 12/13 July. Yorkshire won the toss and chose to bat first. They were all out on the second morning for 352. Roger Iddison scored 112, and was last man out after sharing a tenth-wicket partnership of 72 with Tom Emmett, who scored 47*. Emmett then produced an outstanding bowling performance, and became the first bowler to take sixteen wickets in a single day's play. Cambridgeshire were all out for 40 (Emmett 7/15) in their first innings. Iddison enforced the follow-on, and Cambridgeshire in their second innings were dismissed for 46 (Emmett 9/23). Yorkshire won by an innings and 266 runs.

The 1870 edition of Wisden Cricketers' Almanack (the 7th) confirmed that the match was the only one played by Cambridgeshire in 1869, but the result was "decisively unfortunate to them".

== End of the North/South schism ==
=== Cause ===
The dispute between the professionals of Nottinghamshire and Surrey began when selection of the first England touring team to Australia, in 1861–62, was perceived to have been hi-jacked by Surrey's secretary Billy Burrup. The twelve-man party consisted of six players from Surrey, four from other southern counties, two Yorkshiremen, and no-one from Nottinghamshire. Rightly enough, the northern counties, including Yorkshire, took this as an insult which rankled deeply. At the time, Nottinghamshire was the "northern stronghold" of cricket, its team including top-class players George Parr, Jem Grundy, John Jackson, Cris Tinley, and George Wootton, among others.

The prestigious North v South fixture was badly hit by the dispute. Matters came to a head in 1866 when only a single match in the series was played, instead of the usual two or three. The 1866 match was at Lord's, and several northern players led by Parr refused to take part. The North team, mostly consisting of inexperienced players, was well-beaten by an innings and 43 runs. After that, the fixture was abandoned through 1867 and 1868.

=== North v South matches in 1869 ===
==== The Oval ====
The schism between the northern and southern professionals ended in 1869, and the North v South fixture was revived on 3 June at Kennington Oval, although George Parr, Robert Carpenter, and Thomas Hayward declined to play. The North's fast bowlers, George Freeman and George Wootton, were too good for the South, who lost by nine wickets on a pitch that had been ruined by wet weather in May. Wisden praised the fielding in this match, especially catches taken by Isaac Walker and Joseph Rowbotham.

==== Bramall Lane ====
There were two further North v South matches in 1869, both won by the South. The teams met again at Bramall Lane on 26/27 July, and the South won by 66 runs. W. G. Grace, who was having an outstanding season, scored 122 out of 173 in the first innings. The North replied with 163 (Ephraim Lockwood 49), and Grace took 6/57.

Grace did less well in the South's second innings, being bowled by Freeman for 7. Isaac Walker (46) and Fred Grace (28) saved them from a complete collapse, and they made 111 for a lead of 121. Freeman, who had taken 6/41 in the first innings, took 7/45 in the second for a match return of 13/86.

Needing 122 to win, the North did collapse in their second innings. Lockwood with 28 was the only batsman to reach double figures, and their total was 55. The damage was done by James Southerton, who took 7/34 including a hat-trick (Lockwood, Cornelius Coward, and Thomas Plumb).

==== St Lawrence Ground ====
The third match was played on 9/10 August at the St Lawrence Ground in Canterbury, as part of the Canterbury Cricket Week. The North batted first, and were all out for 107. The South's first innings began disastrously as they lost W. G. Grace, Fred Grace, and Harry Jupp without scoring. WG and Fred were both bowled by Jem Shaw, who went on to take 8/20 as the South were dismissed for 83. The North did better in their second innings to make 154, despite Southerton taking 6/68 (10/128 in the match). This left the South needing 179 to win. A first-wicket partnership of 134 made all the difference. WG was out for 96 at 134/0, and Harry Jupp with 63* led the team to an eight-wicket victory.

== County cricket ==
A total of 22 inter-county matches took place. Surrey played in twelve, six at The Oval and six away. Sussex and Kent played in seven apiece, Nottinghamshire in six, Yorkshire in five, Lancashire in four, Middlesex in two, and Cambridgeshire in one. Hampshire did not play in any.

== Gentlemen v Players ==
The famous Gentlemen v Players fixture was played twice in 1869. The first match was at The Oval on 24 to 26 June, and the Gentlemen won by 17 runs. The second began two days later at Lord's, and the Gentlemen won by three wickets.

== Gentlemen of the South v Players of the South ==
According to Wisden, a record total of 1,136 runs were scored in this match, which was played from 15 to 17 July at Kennington Oval.

The Players of the South totalled 475 all out in their first innings, with Henry Charlwood scoring a career-high 155. Earlier in the innings, Harry Jupp (76) and Ted Pooley (78) had shared a first-wicket stand of 142.

The Gentlemen of the South responded with 553 all out. This was then the highest innings total in first-class cricket, overtaking the MCC record of 523 in 1865. The innings had begun with a world record first-wicket partnership between W. G. Grace (180) and Bransby Cooper (101), who shared 283 runs. (Note: The Grace/Cooper record stood until 1892, when it was beaten by Herbie Hewett and Lionel Palairet, who shared a stand of 346 for Somerset against Yorkshire.) The total was boosted by Isaac Walker (90), and first-class debutant Frederick Fryer (49).

Players of the South began their second innings well into the third and final day. They had made 108/1 by close of play, Pooley scoring 50 for a second half-century, and the result was a draw.

== W. G. Grace ==
=== MCC membership ===
W. G. Grace, who celebrated his 21st birthday on 28 July, became a member of Marylebone Cricket Club (MCC) just before the season began. He was proposed by the treasurer, Thomas Burgoyne, and seconded by the secretary, Robert Allan Fitzgerald.

Given the ongoing rift in the sport during the 1860s between the northern professionals and Surrey, MCC feared the loss of its authority should Grace "throw in his lot with the professionals", so it was considered vital for them, and their interests, to get him onside. As it happens, the dispute was nearly over by the beginning of the 1869 season, but it has been said that "MCC regained its authority over the game by hanging onto WG's shirt-tails".

Grace wore MCC colours for the rest of his career, playing for them on an irregular basis until 1904, and their red and yellow hooped cap became as synonymous with him as his large black beard. He played for MCC on an expenses only basis, but any hopes the club had of keeping him firmly within the amateur ranks would soon be disappointed, for his services were much in demand.

=== Records set in 1869 ===
Grace scored six centuries in 1869, a new record for centuries in a season. Four were achieved in July, including his innings of 180 for the Gentlemen of the South at The Oval. Later in the month, he scored 122 out of 173 in difficult batting conditions during the North v South match at Bramall Lane, prompting the laconic Tom Emmett to call him a "nonsuch" (without equal), and declare: "He ought to be made to play with a littler bat".

On 11 August, Grace became the first batsman to score a century before lunch on the opening day of a first-class match, when he made 106 for MCC against Kent. Only John Sewell, in 1866, had previously accomplished the feat on any day. In the process, Grace beat Thomas Humphrey's 1865 record aggregate, and he went on to set a new record in each of the 1870 and 1871 seasons.

== MCC in 1869 ==
=== First-class matches ===
MCC played in twelve first-class matches,: seven against counties; four against the Oxbridge universities; and one against the South. Their county opponents were Hampshire (twice), Surrey (twice), Lancashire, Nottinghamshire, and Kent.

Having recently become a club member, W. G. Grace made his MCC debut against Oxford University at the Magdalen Ground on 13/14 May. Oxford batted first and were dismissed for 75. Wootton—a ground staff bowler at Lord's as well as playing for Nottinghamshire—took 5/25, and Grace took 5/49. That was impressive enough on debut, but Grace followed it with a century described by Wisden as "remarkable". He scored 117 out of 229. The second-highest scorer was Tom Hearne (also on the Lord's ground staff) with 37, sharing a second-wicket partnership with Grace of exactly 100. In their second innings, Oxford were all out for 124, Wootton taking 7/42 which gave him a match return of 12/67. MCC won by an innings and 30 runs.

Grace made his second appearance for MCC when they played the South at Lord's on 17/18 May. He had no success this time, and MCC's batsmen struggled against Ned Willsher and James Southerton. The South won by an innings and 17 runs.

=== Other matches ===
22 of MCC's matches in 1869 were not first-class, the opponents being minor counties like Norfolk and Suffolk, school/college elevens, military teams, and some work-related teams like the Civil Service and the Metropolitan Police.

== Schools cricket ==
On 23 and 24 June, Charles Francis took 17/40 for Rugby School against Marlborough College on a typically rough Lord's pitch, the best bowling figures in a public school game. Francis made his first-class debut in 1870, playing for Oxford University.

In a 1919 review, when Greville Stevens played for the Gentlemen as a schoolboy, Francis was described as one of only five public school bowlers between 1840 and 1914, (Note: The others were Allan Steel (1877); Sammy Woods (1886); Charlie Townsend (1895); and Jack Crawford (1904 and 1905).) who were good enough to play for the Gentlemen.

== Bibliography ==
- Birley, Derek (1999). A Social History of English Cricket. London: Aurum Press. ISBN 978-18-54107-10-7 – via Internet Archive.
- Darwin, Bernard (1981) [1934]. W. G. Grace (Great Lives Series). London: Duckworth Books. ISBN 978-07-15615-40-9.
- Rae, Simon (1998). W. G. Grace: A Life. London: Faber & Faber. ISBN 978-05-71178-55-1.
- Webber, Roy (1951). The Playfair Book of Cricket Records. London: Playfair Books Ltd. OCLC 753176177.
- Wisden (1920). Pardon, Sydney H. (ed.). Wisden Cricketers' Almanack (57th ed.). London: John Wisden & Co. OCLC 753176177.
- Wisden (2000) [1870]. Knight, W. H. (ed.). Wisden Cricketers' Almanack (7th ed.). London: John Wisden & Co. ISBN 978-1-4729-8338-1.
