= 1864 English cricket season =

Cricket season review

The 1864 English cricket season was the first to be played following the legalisation of overarm bowling. Largely as a result of that, it is from 1864 that matches of historical importance are generally considered to have an unofficial first-class status.

Lancashire County Cricket Club was founded in January 1864, while Middlesex County Cricket Club and Hampshire County Cricket Club both played their initial first-class matches. The increasing number of county clubs gave rise to the inauguration of the unofficial, but widely accepted, concept of the "Champion County".

The season was also notable for publication of the first edition of Wisden Cricketers' Almanack. W. G. Grace, who was sixteen in July 1864, made his first appearances in London. Having played at The Oval, he took part in another match at Lord's, which had just become the freehold property of Marylebone Cricket Club.

== Inter-county cricket ==
The first-class county teams in 1864 were: Cambridgeshire, Hampshire, Kent, Middlesex, Nottinghamshire, Surrey, Sussex, and Yorkshire. The unofficial concept of a "champion county" took a new turn when periodicals began publishing tables of inter-county results, although there was still no formal or agreed method of deciding positions in the table. Haygarth usually refers to 'generally agreed' when announcing the Champion County.

== Events ==
- Law 10 was rewritten by the Marylebone Cricket Club (MCC) to allow a bowler to bring his arm through at any height providing he kept it straight and did not throw the ball. The issue of overarm bowling had crystallised in the Willsher-Lillywhite incident of August 1862.
- 12 January – formation of Lancashire County Cricket Club at a meeting in Manchester.
- 27–29 January – Otago v. Canterbury at Dunedin was the start of first-class cricket in New Zealand.
- Madras v. Calcutta was the start of first-class cricket in India.
- First issue of Wisden Cricketers' Almanack. It was titled John Wisden's Cricketers' Almanack until the 1937 edition.
- 6–7 June – Middlesex County Cricket Club played its initial first-class match v. Sussex at Islington
- 9 June – Playing for MCC against Oxford University, H.E. Bull became only the third player, and the first since 1827, to be dismissed after he hit the ball twice in an important or first-class game.
- 7–8 July – Hampshire County Cricket Club played its initial first-class match v. Sussex at the Antelope Ground, Southampton
- 11–12 July – First appearance of W. G. Grace in a "big" match, though his first-class debut would not occur until the following season.
- MCC finally purchased the freehold of Lord's Cricket Ground for £18,333 6s 8d with money advanced by William Nicholson.
- Leading runscorers in 1864 were the Surrey players Will Mortlock (855) and H. H. Stephenson (824).
- Leading wicket-takers were James Grundy (99) and Ned Willsher (79).

== Bibliography ==
- ACS (1982). A Guide to First-class Cricket Matches Played in the British Isles. Nottingham: ACS. OCLC 10586869.

== Annual reviews ==
- Fred Lillywhite, The Guide to Cricketers, Lillywhite, 1865
- John Lillywhite's Cricketer's Companion (Green Lilly), Lillywhite, 1865
- Wisden Cricketers' Almanack, 1865
