= Julius Caesar (cricketer) =

English cricketer (1830–1878)

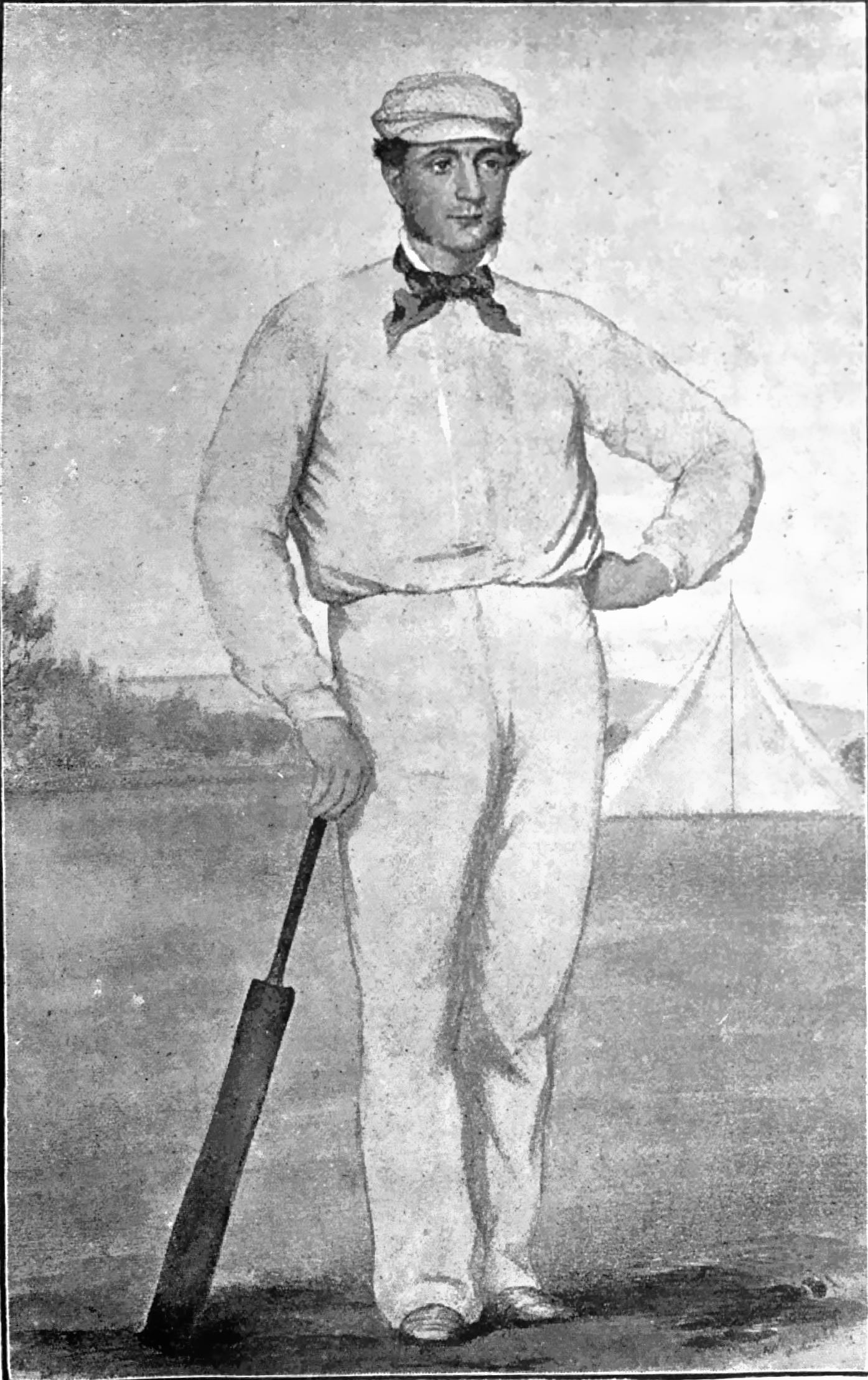

Personal information
- Full name: Julius Caesar
- Born: 25 March 1830; Godalming, Surrey, England
- Died: 6 March 1878 (aged 47); Godalming, Surrey, England
- Batting: Right-handed
- Bowling: Right arm fast (roundarm)

Domestic team information
- Years: Team
- 1849–1867: Surrey

Julius Caesar (25 March 1830 – 6 March 1878) was an English cricketer who played in 194 matches between 1849 and 1867.

== Childhood ==
Julius Caesar was born in Godalming, Surrey, to Benjamin Caesar, an English professional cricketer, and his wife Anne (née Bowler). Benjamin and Anne had seven children. George, Richard, Lawrence William, Ann, Benjamin, Frederick Bowler and finally Julius. He was brought up in Godalming, a town that then had approximately 4,000 inhabitants, in Surrey, England. He was almost certainly educated in one of the two schools in Godalming at the time, and could read and write with a legible hand.

Benjamin himself played, and his brother Fred later played too.

Caesar's cricketing skills first attracted local press attention when he was 16. On 7 July 1846 the Surrey Gazette wrote:

A single-wicket match was played on the New Ground, Godalming, between Julius Caesar, a lad of 16 years of age, of the Godalming Cricket Club, and Mr C Coomber, of Eashing. Caesar went in first and obtained five which, with one wide, made six. Coomber fetched three runs which, with three wides, made six. Caesar for his second innings got 49, and wides three, making a total with the first of 58. Coomber followed and, after 35 balls were delivered, obtained no run and scored only one wide, leaving Caesar the winner by 51. The lad promises to be as noted in the game of cricket as his ancient namesake was in the art of war. The Godalming club are ready to back him against any lad of his age in the County of Surrey.

He found an influential friend in the Marshall family, proprietors of a local timber merchants. Henry Marshall was the first mayor of Godalming in 1836. He was also a prominent member of Surrey County Cricket Club, which was formed in 1845, and president of Surrey club from 1856 to 1867.

In 1848 Caesar first played at the Oval, for Godalming cricket club against Surrey. Against a mostly professional attack, Caesar made 67 and 46 as Godalming scored 161 and 192 for 5 and dismissed Surrey for 158 before Surrey "gave up".

In June 1849, 10 weeks after his 19th birthday, and on the recommendation of Alexander Marshall, Caesar played for the second time at the Oval. He played for the Players (i.e. professionals) of Surrey against the county's gentlemen (i.e. amateurs). Caesar played off the front foot, and was an aggressive batsman, and made 30 in his innings, a good score that was the second highest in the match. The Players went on to win by 10 wickets, and the Surrey Standard said of Caesar's performance:

Caesar is a fine steady bat, but without the flair and finish of Caffyn; neither is his bowling so good; but his fielding at point is extremely beautiful.

On 28 and 29 June Caesar first played inter-county cricket, taking on Sussex at the Oval, where he scored a reasonable-looking 15 as Surrey won by 15 runs. He did better in the return match at Petworth 3 weeks later, scoring 30; however, Surrey fared worse, losing by an innings. On 6 and 7 August, Caesar first came across William Clarke as Surrey took on England at the Oval. Caesar opened the batting for Surrey, scoring 18 after "hitting away in good style". In the second innings, Caesar was out to Clarke himself, after playing back to him and hitting his own wicket for 2. Surrey went on to beat England by 31 runs. Caesar completed the 1849 with a 25 for the Players of Surrey against Twenty Gentlemen of Surrey Club in the return match which the Players won by 2 wickets.

The wages for a professional around this time, though they varied, would have been around £4 a match for a draw or loss, £5 for a win. Sometimes, if there was a special achievement, such as a half-century, a ground collection would be made for that player.

Clarke was a cricket entrepreneur, who had created his own professional All England Eleven that toured the country, playing local teams, usually at odds, and in front large audiences. The tours not only increased cricket's popularity but were also treated as large carnival events in the towns and villages they visited. Often fairs and side attractions would be organised to coincide with the cricket, with the visit by the All England Eleven being the main topic of conversation for months earlier. Caesar was to join the All England Eleven in 1851.

On Tuesday 4 June 1850, Caesar married Jane Brewser, the daughter of a carpenter in the parish church of Stoke-next-Guildford. The age of majority, before which they needed their parents' permission to marry, was 21, and they gave their ages as 22, even though they were both 20 at the time. They also both gave the same address of Stoke Fields (Guildford). They had a son two months later on 29 July. Although originally called Frederick William, he was christened William Sankey on 1 December 1850 at St John's Church, Farncombe.

At the end of July 1850, Caesar came across Clarke again, when he played for Fourteen of Surrey against the All England Eleven. The game was drawn, and Caesar scored 18 before being bowled by Clarke himself.

Then on 8 and 9 August came a match which was greatly anticipated, and one which is best remembered, entirely for its novelty value: Julius and eleven of his family played eleven locally based amateurs. The match was advertised as "Twelve Caesars and Eleven Gentlemen of Godalming and District". This was a deliberate play on Suetonius' famous Roman history The Twelve Caesars. The Caesars started out as the bookmakers' favourites. The match attracted a great crowd, who saw the Gentlemen make 123, before the Caesars scored 95. The Caesars then skittled out the Gentlemen for 42 to leave only 71 to win. But, to the surprise of many, they only got 54, losing by 16 runs.

== Joining the All England Eleven ==
The last game Caesar played in 1850 was against the All England Eleven, and he scored 18 as Fourteen of Surrey secured a draw. His first such game in 1851 was also against the All England Eleven. It was another draw, but Caesar impressed, top-scoring with 38. In July, Surrey played Nottinghamshire for the first time. Nottinghamshire were led by Clarke, and included the great George Parr, and Surrey won comfortably by 75 runs. However, Caesar himself was out without scoring in both innings, and he became extremely dejected. This fear that failure in one match would lead to his summary dismissal stayed with him throughout his cricketing life. However, he recovered, and at the beginning of August scored his maiden half-century for Surrey, against Yorkshire at the Oval.

It was then that he joined the All England Eleven, playing his first game for them at Newark-on-Trent. This meant Caesar would now tour the country, playing cricket, and receiving somewhere between £4 and £6 from Clarke, from which he would also have to pay his expenses. Caesar's form dropped, which would have made him more anxious about his place, and he got up to some strange antics at hotels. He became irrationally nervous fearing that someone may have died in his bed, or that the hotel would burn down. One time, after yells from a drunkard outside, Caesar convinced himself that there was a fire and rang the alarm bell, causing minor panic amongst the other guests.

1852 saw a split, with many cricketers in the All England Eleven leaving to form a rival United All England Eleven under John Wisden. The split was most likely because of William Clarke's parsimony and unwillingness to increase the wages he paid his players. Caesar, the youngest of Clarke's professionals, chose to remain with the All England Eleven. In June, the All England Eleven played Sixteen of Godalming and District over three days. However, this time Caesar played for Godalming, with the match being partially for Caesar's benefit. Four other Caesars also turned out for Godalming.

Although Caesar was always nervous of failure, he appears to have been highly regarded by other players. He often opened the innings. Richard Daft, a fellow Englander, wrote that "his hitting was as smart and clean as anything that could be witnessed".

== England ==
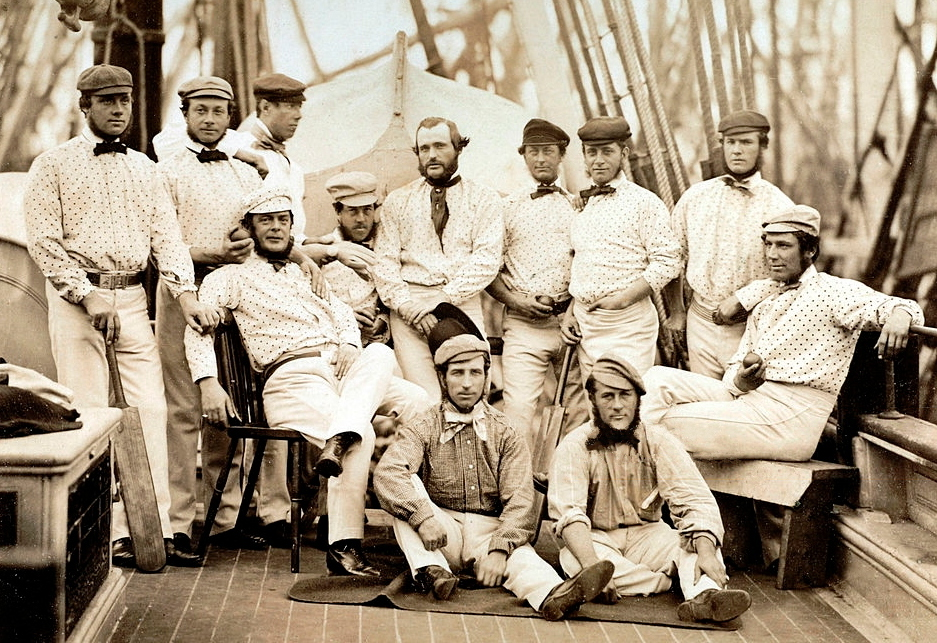
The first English touring team pictured on board ship at Liverpool: standing at left Robert Carpenter, William Caffyn, Tom Lockyer; middle row John Wisden, HH Stephenson, George Parr, James Grundy, Julius Caesar, Thomas Hayward, John Jackson; front row Alfred Diver, John Lillywhite.

In 1853, Caesar first played for England. The game was against Nottinghamshire at Lord's. He scored only 1 and 7, but his second dismissal caused some controversy. He dabbed at a ball from John Birkley, which went towards the wicket-keeper. In taking the ball, the wicket-keeper dislodged a bail, at which point the umpire announced him out bowled. The wicket-keeper remained silent as Caesar walked. Caesar fared better in the weeks after this and put together a series of high scores, including 63 not out in Cirencester. In August, he got his maiden century, for England against Kent. His 101 included one five, nine fours and five threes.

1854 saw Caesar involved in controversy when he was playing for England against Nottinghamshire at Lord's. That year, the Marylebone Cricket Club, the guardian of the laws of cricket introduced a new rule permitting injured batsmen a runner so that they themselves did not have to run between the wickets. So when, in the second innings, Caesar was batting with John Wisden, and Caesar, perhaps suffering from gout, asked for a runner, William Buttress came out to substitute for him. Later Caesar drove a ball from William Clarke and, forgetting his runner, proceeded to make his own way to the opposite wicket, with Wisden also swapping ends. Buttress stayed still and Clarke put down the wicket at the bowler's end (where Caesar was). The umpire gave Wisden out, saying on the grounds that Buttress (Caesar's runner) and Wisden had not crossed. But Clarke disagreed and said Caesar should go. When the umpire refused, Clarke and Nottinghamshire walked off. Bell's Life reported that "After a long argument at the pavilion, it was decided that Caesar should go out. Neither the striker nor the substitute being off their ground, we are of the opinion (according to the law) that Wisden ought to have been given out, although the case would have been very hard indeed."

Surrey did not play at the Oval in 1854 as a result of a dispute with the lease. To supplement his income, Caesar was employed by one of the Marshalls at the new Cricketers' pub in Nightingale Road, Farncombe. 1854 was as strong a year for Caesar as 1853, with him averaging a very respectable 22.30. This was good enough for him to be selected for the Players (professionals) against the Gentlemen (amateurs) at Lord's. However, he wasn't to play in the game as a dispute had arisen between Clarke (his All England Eleven boss) and the MCC. He did, however, still turn out for Surrey, topping the county averages with 35.28 from the four matches he played.

== Miscellaneous information ==
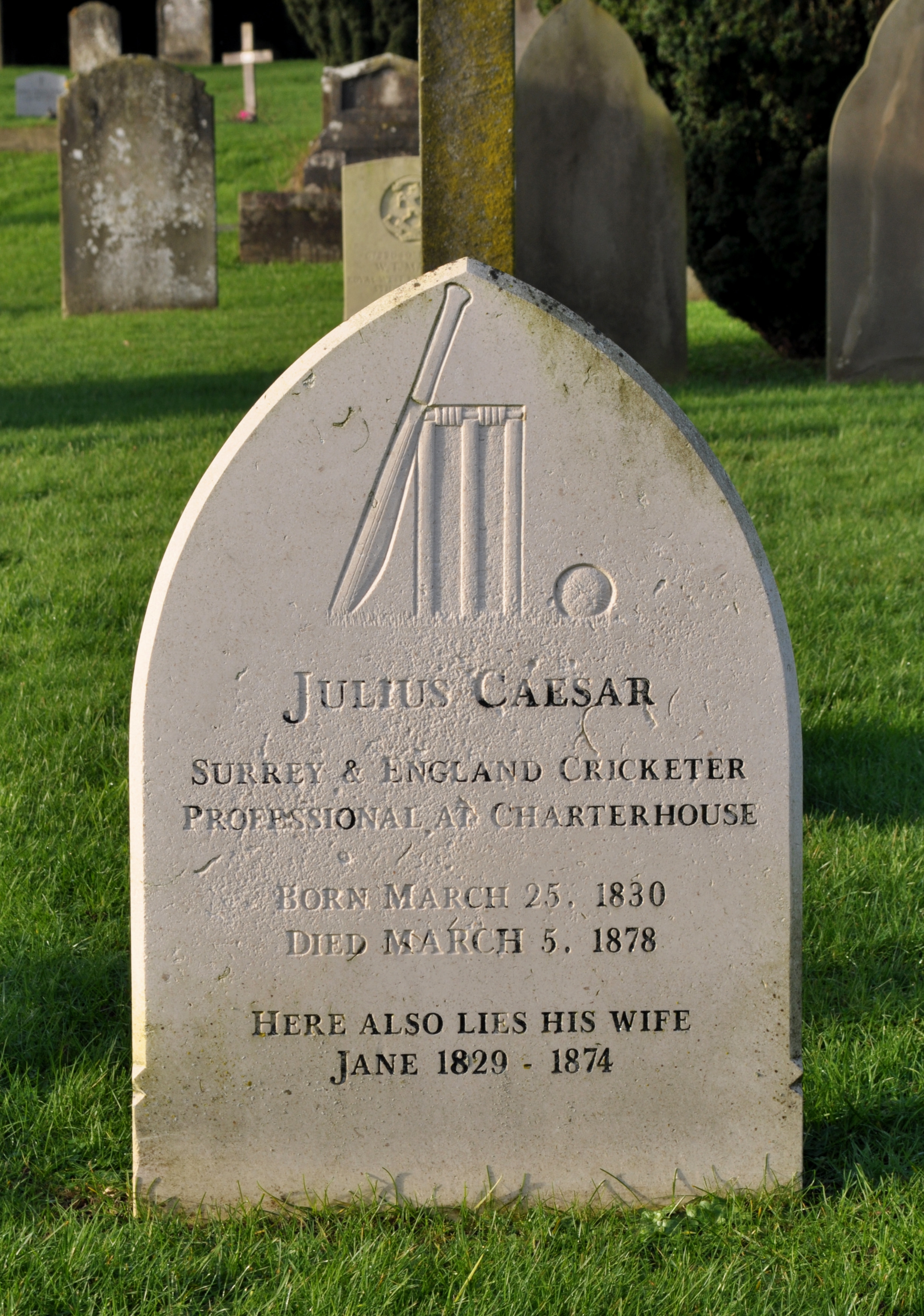
Caesar's grave in Nightingale cemetery Godalming

He was a carpenter and joiner by trade, but became cricket coach and groundsman at Charterhouse School in later life. One of his pupils at Charterhouse was C. Aubrey Smith who went on to play for Sussex, captain England in his only Test match and become a famous Hollywood movie star.

Lillywhite records his height as 5 feet 7 1/2 inches (171.5 cm) and his weight as 12 stone 6 pounds (79 kg), and he is said to have been a very powerful man for his size. As a batsman, he was a fine free-hitter, especially forward and to the leg side, and made excellent scores for his county, especially in and about 1861. However, his batting average was only 15.78 from 333 innings, with three centuries, including a top score of 132 not out.

He is said to have fielded well anywhere, though generally at point, where he took some wonderful catches. He was a fast round-armed bowler, but was seldom asked to bowl. He took 13 wickets with a bowling average of 23.62.

He was also a member of George Parr's team that visited North America – the first British cricket tour overseas, organised by Fred Lillywhite – and joined Parr's team that toured Australia and New Zealand in 1863/64. This involved travelling on the SS Great Britain.

It is said that he suffered from dropsy while coaching at Charterhouse and it is this that probably contributed to his early death.

== External sources ==
- Julius Caesar at Cricinfo
