= 1856 English cricket season =

Cricket season review

The 1856 English cricket season was the 30th of the roundarm era. (Note: Any match listed in the ACS' Important Match Guide (1981) is historically important, and therefore of the highest standard, whether or not a scorecard might exist. The same applies to numerous matches discovered by researchers since 1981. For further information, see First-class cricket.) Surrey began a run of success with a team that featured William Caffyn, Tom Lockyer, Edgar Willsher, HH Stephenson and Julius Caesar.

== Important matches ==
- 1856 match list

== Leading batsmen ==
John Lillywhite was the leading runscorer with 620 @ 24.80

Other leading batsmen were: J Wisden, J Caesar, E Napper, WS Norton, J Grundy, ET Drake, J Dean, W Caffyn, J Makinson, W Nicholson

== Leading bowlers ==
John Wisden was the leading wicket-taker with 73

Other leading bowlers were: E Willsher, J Dean, W Martingell, E Hinkly, WSTW Fiennes, CDB Marsham, J Grundy, J Lillywhite

== Bibliography ==
- ACS (1981). A Guide to Important Cricket Matches Played in the British Isles 1709–1863. Nottingham: ACS. OCLC 85045528.
- Warner, Pelham (1946). Lords: 1787–1945. London: Harrap. OCLC 877106024.
