= 1858 English cricket season =

Cricket season review

The 1857 English cricket season was the 32nd of the roundarm era. (Note: Any match listed in the ACS' Important Match Guide (1981) is historically important, and therefore of the highest standard, whether or not a scorecard might exist. The same applies to numerous matches discovered by researchers since 1981. For further information, see First-class cricket.) The great fast bowler John Jackson was the leading bowler for the first time.

== Important matches ==
- 1858 match list

== Leading batsmen ==
William Caffyn was the leading runscorer with 516 @ 21.50

Other leading batsmen were: J Wisden, FP Miller, G Parr, AJD Diver, J Grundy, HH Stephenson, FH Norman, J Lillywhite, T Lockyer, CG Lane

== Leading bowlers ==
John Jackson was the leading wicket-taker with 102

Other leading bowlers were: HH Stephenson, W Caffyn, J Wisden, VE Walker, J Grundy

== Bibliography ==
- ACS (1981). A Guide to Important Cricket Matches Played in the British Isles 1709–1863. Nottingham: ACS. OCLC 85045528.
- Warner, Pelham (1946). Lords: 1787–1945. London: Harrap. OCLC 877106024.
