= John Jackson (cricketer, born 1833) =

English cricketer

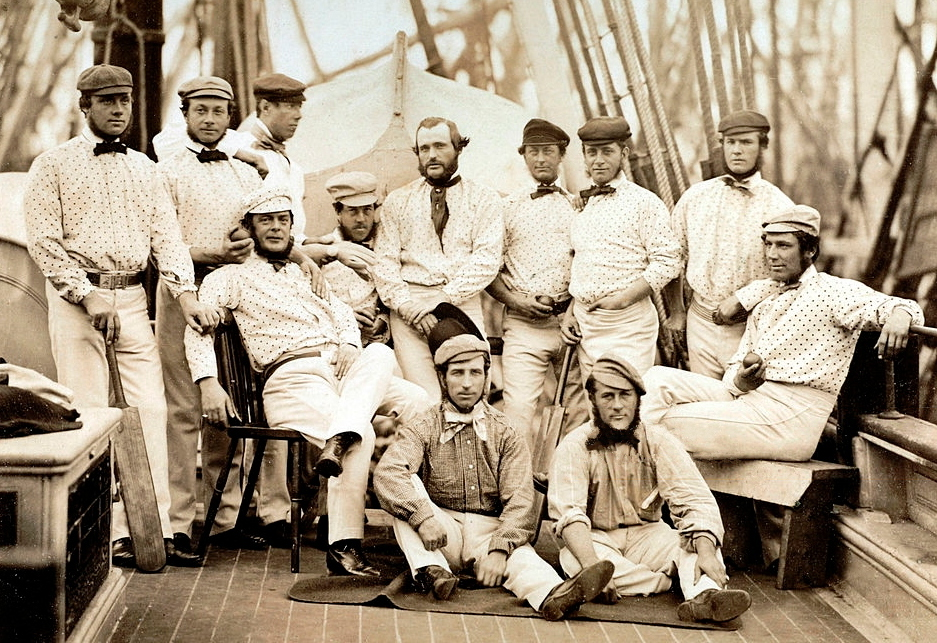
The first English touring team pictured on board ship at Liverpool: standing at left Robert Carpenter, William Caffyn, Tom Lockyer; middle row John Wisden, H. H. Stephenson, George Parr, James Grundy, Julius Caesar, Thomas Hayward, John Jackson; front row Alfred Diver, John Lillywhite.

John "Foghorn" Jackson (21 May 1833 – 4 November 1901) was a Nottinghamshire and All England Eleven cricketer who was generally reckoned to be the outstanding fast bowler of the 1850s.

Born in Bungay in Suffolk, Jackson was affectionately known as "Foghorn". He was a powerful, if inconsistent bat and an occasional wicketkeeper, but he was best known as a right-arm fast bowler of fearsome pace and ability. Haygarth stated that his career, 'though rather short, must have been most brilliant.' He was the first cricketer to appear in a cartoon in Punch.

He played for Nottinghamshire from 1855 to 1866 and also represented Kent in 1858. In 1859, he took part in the first ever overseas cricket tour when he was a member of the England team visiting North America. He also toured Australia and New Zealand in 1863–64. During this trip, the team sailed from Liverpool to Melbourne on board the SS Great Britain.

His overall career record covered 115 matches. He scored 1993 runs at an average of 12.61 with a highest score of 100. He took 106 catches. Jackson took 655 wickets for 7491 runs at 11.52, taking 100 wickets in 1858 and 1860. His best innings analysis was 9/27 and he took 5 wickets in an innings on 59 occasions and 10 wickets in a match 20 times. He was only 33 when he dropped out of County cricket and latterly appeared for local teams against the All England Eleven.

Jackson lived his later life in extreme poverty despite the County awarding a benefit of £300 in 1874. He died at Brownlow Hill, a Liverpool workhouse.
