= James Grundy (cricketer) =

English cricketer

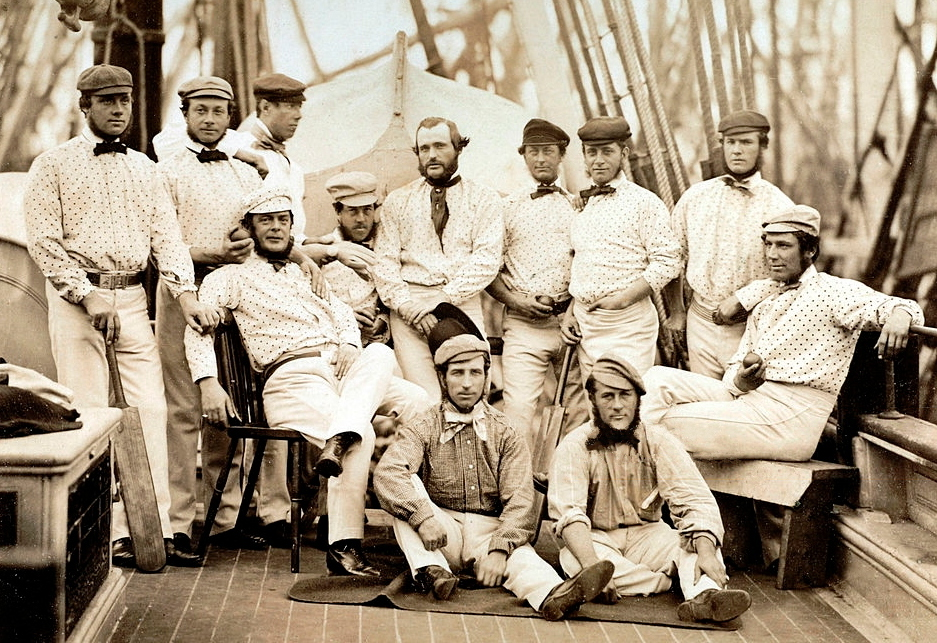
The first English touring team pictured on board ship at Liverpool: standing at left Robert Carpenter, William Caffyn, Tom Lockyer; middle row John Wisden, HH Stephenson, George Parr, James Grundy, Julius Caesar, Thomas Hayward, John Jackson; front row Alfred Diver, John Lillywhite.

James "Jem" Grundy (5 March 1824 in New Radford, Nottingham – 24 November 1873 in Carrington, Nottingham) was an English cricketer during the game's roundarm era. He was one of the notable bowlers of the 1850s and was frequently among the leading wicket-takers. He bowled right-arm fast roundarm and is known to have occasionally used fast underarm deliveries, but he is said to have varied his pace. He batted right-handed and was an occasional wicket-keeper.

Grundy's known career spanned the 1850 to 1869 seasons. He took 1,137 wickets in 298 matches with a bowling average of 12.81 with a best analysis of 9/19. He had 84 5-wicket innings and 24 10-wicket matches. He scored 5,898 runs with the bat at an average of 12.65 with a highest score of 95. He took 233 catches and made 2 stumpings.

In 1857, he became the first person to be given out handled the ball.

At the end of the 1859 English cricket season, Grundy was one of the 12 players who took part in cricket's first-ever overseas tour when an England cricket team led by George Parr visited North America.

Grundy, who kept the "Cricketers' Arms" hotel in Nottingham, in his later years suffered from gout, the probable cause of his death.
