= William Pickering (cricketer) =

English cricketer

Personal information
- Full name: William Percival Pickering
- Born: 25 October 1819; Clapham, London, England
- Died: 16 August 1905 (aged 85); Vancouver, British Columbia, Canada
- Batting: Right-handed
- Bowling: Left-arm medium
- Role: Batsman

Domestic team information
- Years: Team
- 1840–1842: Cambridge University
- 1841–1843: Marylebone Cricket Club (MCC)
- 1846–1848: Surrey
- Source: CricketArchive, 17 April 2013

William Percival Pickering (25 October 1819 – 16 August 1905) was an English cricketer with amateur status. He was one of the founders of Surrey County Cricket Club in 1845 and later, having emigrated to Canada, played a significant role in the beginnings of international cricket especially through his proposal to fund an English tour of North America. Pickering is recorded in 29 matches from 1840 to 1848 which are designated by CricketArchive, totalling 445 runs at the low average of 9.67 with a highest score of 51 not out, holding 17 catches and taking 7 wickets.

== Eton ==
Born in Clapham, London, Pickering was the youngest son of Edward Rowland Pickering of Clapham and was educated at Eton College where, according to his obituary in The Times, "he is believed to be one of the youngest cricketers who ever took part in the great public school matches at Lord's between Eton, Harrow and Winchester". He played for Eton in 1834, 1835, 1837 and 1838, captaining the team in the last two years but missing the 1836 season entirely. The obituary claims that Pickering's strength was his fielding: "He generally fielded at cover-point, and, being ambidextrous, ran out, by returning the ball with his left hand, many batsmen who had forgotten this peculiarity." After Eton he went up to Pembroke College, Cambridge.

== Surrey ==
Pickering was instrumental in the foundation of Surrey County Cricket Club, speaking at a meeting of Surrey cricketers in October 1845 to explain the objectives of the newly formed club: i.e., to develop the cricketing strength of the county and provide it with "a local habitation and a name". Pickering played in two of Surrey's earliest matches in 1846 and 1848; also representing the Surrey Club against Marylebone Cricket Club at Lord's Cricket Ground in 1846.

== Canada ==
After 1848, Pickering's playing career diminished and he made only two recorded appearances, both in minor matches for I Zingari, from 1849 to 1851. He then emigrated to Canada and was active as a player there until he returned to England in either 1859 or 1860. Pickering played for the Canadian national team against the United States on four occasions between 1853 and 1857. Pickering was involved with the Montreal Cricket Club, which was the leading cricket body in North American cricket in the 1850s. In 1856, he proposed that an English team should tour North America on the guarantee of the Montreal Club. Negotiations between various parties lasted three years and were finally concluded during Canterbury Week in August 1859. As a result, George Parr led the first English touring team to North America in September and October that year, the twelve players receiving £50 each plus expenses from the Montreal Club. Pickering made four appearances involving Parr's team.

Pickering had returned to England by the summer of 1860 and was a frequent member of I Zingari teams until 1872. He became a member of the London Stock Exchange but at the time of his death "had emigrated to Canada some years ago". He was recorded in five matches in Toronto between 1877 and 1879. He died 16 August 1905 in Vancouver, British Columbia.
