= 1849 English cricket season =

Cricket season review

The 1849 English cricket season was the 23rd of the roundarm era. (Note: Any match listed in the ACS' Important Match Guide (1981) is historically important, and therefore of the highest standard, whether or not a scorecard might exist. The same applies to numerous matches discovered by researchers since 1981. For further information, see First-class cricket.) The first Roses Match took place during this season.

== Events ==
23 to 25 July. Sheffield Cricket Club, playing as "Yorkshire", and Manchester Cricket Club, playing as "Lancashire", met at Hyde Park in Sheffield. It was the first match to involve teams called Yorkshire and Lancashire so was, therefore, the first Roses match. Yorkshire won by 5 wickets.

== Leading batsmen ==
George Parr was the leading runscorer with 529 runs at an average of 31.11

Other leading batsmen were: Nicholas Felix, Thomas Box, James Dean, Alfred Mynn, William Nicholson, Fuller Pilch, Robert Turner King, Tom Adams, William Hillyer, William Martingell

== Leading bowlers ==
William Hillyer was the leading wicket-taker with 141 wickets at an average of 13.20

Other leading bowlers were: John Wisden (notable for launching Wisden Cricketers' Almanack), William Clarke, William (FW) Lillywhite, James Dean, Edmund Hinkly, Edward Blore, William Martingell

== Bibliography ==
- ACS (1981). A Guide to Important Cricket Matches Played in the British Isles 1709–1863. Nottingham: ACS. OCLC 85045528.
- Warner, Pelham (1946). Lords: 1787–1945. London: Harrap. OCLC 877106024.
