= George Carpenter (cricketer) =

English cricketer

George Carpenter (28 February 1818 – 3 June 1849) was an English first-class cricketer active 1838–1844 who played for Cambridge Town Club. He was born and died in Cambridge. A brother of Robert Carpenter, he appeared in nine first-class matches.

== Bibliography ==
- Haygarth, Arthur (1996) [1862]. Scores & Biographies, Volume 1 (1744–1826). Kennington: Frederick Lillywhite. ISBN 978-19-00592-23-9.
- Haygarth, Arthur (1997) [1862]. Scores & Biographies, Volume 2 (1827–1840). Kennington: Frederick Lillywhite. ISBN 978-19-00592-23-9.
