= 1851 English cricket season =

Cricket season review

The 1851 English cricket season was the 25th of the roundarm era. (Note: Any match listed in the ACS' Important Match Guide (1981) is historically important, and therefore of the highest standard, whether or not a scorecard might exist. The same applies to numerous matches discovered by researchers since 1981. For further information, see First-class cricket.) Jem Grundy took over 100 wickets in the season.

== Important matches ==
- 1851 match list

== Leading batsmen ==
G. Chatterton was the leading runscorer with 455 @ 19.78

Other leading batsmen were: N. Felix, J. Guy, G. Parr, W. Caffyn, J. Dean, W. Nicholson, J. Grundy, A. Haygarth, J. Caesar

== Leading bowlers ==
J. Grundy was the leading wicket-taker with 114

Other leading bowlers were: J. Wisden, W. Clarke, T. Sherman, T. Nixon, J. Dean, W. R. Hillyer

== Bibliography ==
- ACS (1981). A Guide to Important Cricket Matches Played in the British Isles 1709–1863. Nottingham: ACS. OCLC 85045528.
- Warner, Pelham (1946). Lords: 1787–1945. London: Harrap. OCLC 877106024.
