= 1854 English cricket season =

Cricket season review

The 1854 English cricket season was the 28th of the roundarm era. (Note: Any match listed in the ACS' Important Match Guide (1981) is historically important, and therefore of the highest standard, whether or not a scorecard might exist. The same applies to numerous matches discovered by researchers since 1981. For further information, see First-class cricket.) The follow-on differential was reduced to 80 (60 in one day).

== Important matches ==
- 1854 match list

== Leading batsmen ==
J Dean was the leading runscorer with 516 @ 16.12

Other leading batsmen were: T Lockyer, J Lillywhite, W Caffyn, W Nicholson, TM Adams, J Caesar, J Grundy, G Parr

== Leading bowlers ==
John Wisden was the leading wicket-taker with 106

Other leading bowlers were: J Grundy, J Dean, ET Drake, T Nixon, W Clarke, HH Stephenson, E Willsher

== Bibliography ==
- ACS (1981). A Guide to Important Cricket Matches Played in the British Isles 1709–1863. Nottingham: ACS. OCLC 85045528.
- Warner, Pelham (1946). Lords: 1787–1945. London: Harrap. OCLC 877106024.
