= Alfred Clarke (Nottinghamshire cricketer) =

English cricketer

Alfred Clarke (born 16 February 1831 at Nottingham; died 23 October 1878 at Ruddington, Nottinghamshire) was an English professional cricketer who played from 1851 to 1863. He was mainly associated with Nottinghamshire County Cricket Club and made 55 known appearances in important matches.

Clarke was the son of William Clarke and he played for the AEE, founded by his father, from 1851 until his retirement. He made 10 appearances for the North in the North v South series and was a member of the English cricket team in Australia in 1863–64 led by his Nottinghamshire colleague George Parr. Clarke retired from cricket when the tour ended.

== Bibliography ==
- Arthur Haygarth, Scores & Biographies, several volumes, Lillywhite, 1862–72
