= Benjamin Caesar =

English cricketer

Benjamin Julius Caesar (12 March 1797 – 1867) was an English professional cricketer who played from 1824 to 1830. He was mainly associated with Godalming Cricket Club and Surrey and made eleven known appearances in important matches. He was the father of Julius Caesar.

== Bibliography ==
- Haygarth, Arthur (1996) [1862]. Scores & Biographies, Volume 1 (1744–1826). Kennington: Frederick Lillywhite. ISBN 978-19-00592-23-9.
- Haygarth, Arthur (1997) [1862]. Scores & Biographies, Volume 2 (1827–1840). Kennington: Frederick Lillywhite. ISBN 978-19-00592-23-9.
