= 1855 English cricket season =

Cricket season review

The 1855 English cricket season was the 29th of the roundarm era. (Note: Any match listed in the ACS' Important Match Guide (1981) is historically important, and therefore of the highest standard, whether or not a scorecard might exist. The same applies to numerous matches discovered by researchers since 1981. For further information, see First-class cricket.) It was a successful season for Sussex, largely thanks to the combined efforts of Dean and Wisden.

== Important matches ==
- 1855 match list

== Leading batsmen ==
John Wisden was the leading runscorer with 422 @ 28.13.

Other leading batsmen were: W Caffyn, J Lillywhite, G Parr, A Haygarth, TM Adams, J Grundy, FP Miller, W Fellows, T Lockyer.

== Leading bowlers ==
J Dean was the leading wicket-taker with 98.

Other leading bowlers were: J Lillywhite, J Wisden, ET Drake, J Grundy, CDB Marsham, T Sherman.

== Bibliography ==
- ACS (1981). A Guide to Important Cricket Matches Played in the British Isles 1709–1863. Nottingham: ACS. OCLC 85045528.
- Warner, Pelham (1946). Lords: 1787–1945. London: Harrap. OCLC 877106024.
