= 1850 English cricket season =

Cricket season review

The 1850 English cricket season was the 24th of the roundarm era. (Note: Any match listed in the ACS' Important Match Guide (1981) is historically important, and therefore of the highest standard, whether or not a scorecard might exist. The same applies to numerous matches discovered by researchers since 1981. For further information, see First-class cricket.) The re-emergence occurred of Middlesex as a county team, largely through the efforts of the Walker family that eventually founded the present Middlesex County Cricket Club.

== Important matches ==
- 1850 match list

== Leading batsmen ==
John Wisden was the leading runscorer with 374 @ 18.70

Other leading batsmen were: G Parr, T Box, J Guy, N Felix, W Caffyn, F Pilch, A Mynn

== Leading bowlers ==
John Wisden was the leading wicket-taker with 103

Other leading bowlers were: W Clarke, T Sherman, D Day, WR Hillyer, HW Fellows, W Martingell

== Bibliography ==
- ACS (1981). A Guide to Important Cricket Matches Played in the British Isles 1709–1863. Nottingham: ACS. OCLC 85045528.
- Warner, Pelham (1946). Lords: 1787–1945. London: Harrap. OCLC 877106024.
