= The Guide to Cricketers =

The Guide to Cricketers was a cricket annual edited by Fred Lillywhite between 1849 and his death in 1866. The title varied somewhat but was generally along the lines of The Guide to Cricketers. It is often referred to as Lillywhite's Guide.

The first edition was published in 1849 and was called The young cricketer's guide, containing full direction for playing the noble and manly game of cricket by William Lillywhite. To which is added the Laws of the game, with the latest alterations, and some brief remarks upon fifty of the most celebrated gentlemen and players in England. The whole collected and edited by Frederick Lillywhite'. It was just 32 pages long and sold for 1s 6d.

The second edition (also 1849) was almost identical but contained an inserted slip entitles 'Alteration of Law VII.' The third edition (1850) added a section on cricket grounds, expanded the biographies, and had three pages of batting and bowling averages for the 1849 season.

It was only from the fourth edition (1851) that the Guide took on its standard format with a more detailed 'Review of the Season,' i.e., of 1850, and became like a modern cricket annual. The Guide continued with annual editions, but occasionally, two editions were produced in a year (a winter edition and a spring edition). The last edition was published in 1866 and was the 22nd edition.

The annual contained the Laws of Cricket and then more sections on how to play the game with hints about umpiring fielding positions, and sections of a similar nature. It might also contain short sections on the laws of other sports.

The majority of the annual was taken up with a review of the previous season. Generally, only brief details were given rather than full scorecards. This consisted of the names of the two teams, the venue, and the date of the match plus the innings totals and results. However, there would often be a description of the game, giving important details. The major counties were covered, together with the M.C.C., Universities, professional elevens, and public schools. A large number of very brief biographies were often included.

John Lillywhite's Cricketer's Companion started in 1865 and with Fred's death this incorporated The Guide to Cricketers from 1867. James Lillywhite's Cricketers' Annual started in 1872 and this in turn incorporated the John Lillywhite's Cricketer's Companion which ceased after the 1885 edition. James Lillywhite's Cricketers' Annual continued until 1900. John Lillywhite's Cricketers' Companion is referred to as "Green Lillywhite" and James Lillywhite's Cricketers' Annual as "Red Lillywhite" because of the colours of their covers.

Alfred D Taylor thought that the 6th edition (1853) was "of especial value, being the rarest issue of the series". Such was the rarity of this edition that Thomas Padwick wrote out the whole 230 pages by hand because he was unable to acquire a copy. The last few editions are the most common.

On 14 January 2004 a nearly complete set of 'The Guide to Cricketers' sold for £70,000. Leslie Guttereridge Auction at Lawrences Auctioneers
