= Edwin Diver =

English cricketer (1861–1924)

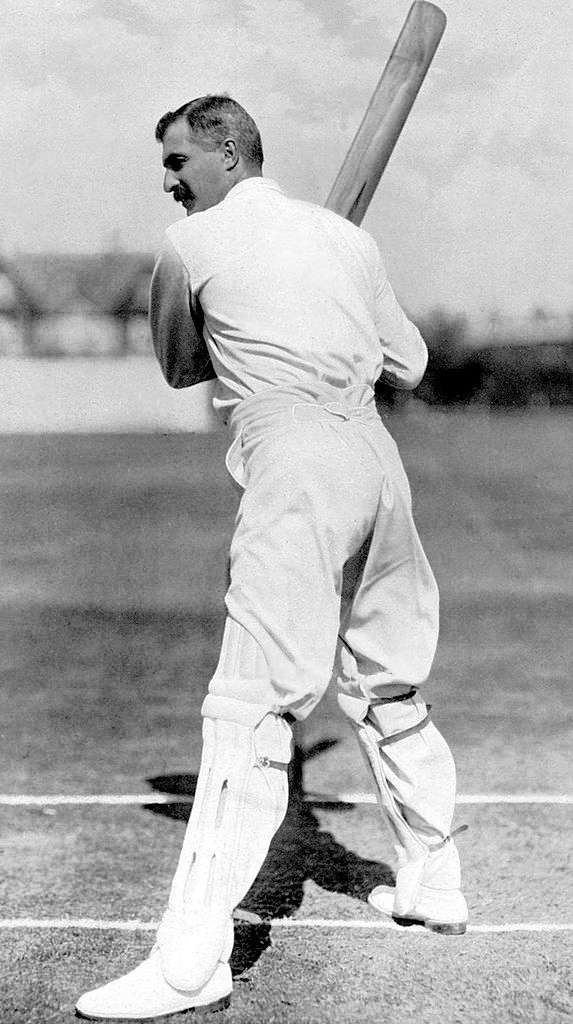

Personal information
- Full name: Edwin James Diver
- Born: 20 March 1861; Cambridge, Cambridgeshire, England
- Died: 27 December 1924 (aged 63); Pontardawe, Glamorgan, Wales
- Batting: Right-handed
- Bowling: Right-arm medium
- Role: Batsman

Domestic team information
- Years: Team
- 1883–1886: Surrey
- 1894–1901: Warwickshire
- First-class debut: 24 May 1883 Surrey v Hampshire
- Last First-class: 6 July 1901 Warwickshire v Surrey

Career statistics
Competition	First-class
Matches	205
Runs scored	7245
Batting average	23.00
100s/50s	5/45
Top score	184
Balls bowled	496
Wickets	6
Bowling average	51.83
5 wickets in innings	1
10 wickets in match	–
Best bowling	6/58
Catches/stumpings	117/4
- Source: CricketArchive, 8 July 2015

Edwin James Diver (20 March 1861 – 27 December 1924) was an English first-class cricketer who played for Surrey and Warwickshire between 1883 and 1901. He was born in Cambridge and died at Pontardawe, Glamorgan, Wales.

The nephew of the mid-Victorian cricketer Alfred Diver, Edwin Diver was primarily a right-handed middle-order batsman, though he was also occasionally used as a wicketkeeper and even more occasionally as a right-arm medium-pace bowler, just once to devastating effect. He also played football as a goalkeeper for the Cambridgeshire county side and for Aston Villa.

== Surrey cricketer ==
Diver qualified to play cricket for Surrey by residence as a schoolmaster at a school in Wimbledon and played for the county for four years from 1883. In the first three seasons, he played as an amateur. Though to modern eyes his figures do not look out-of-the-ordinary, his early career with Surrey was judged as "short but brilliant" by the editor of Wisden Cricketers' Almanack, Sydney Pardon: in the obituary of Diver in the 1925 edition, Pardon wrote that he had been "a most attractive batsman in point of style, with splendid hitting power on the off side" and that his success had been instant.

In 1884, Diver was awarded his county cap by Surrey and was also selected for some of the most significant first-class matches of the season: the games between a "Gentlemen of England" side and the Australian touring team and the Gentlemen v Players match at The Oval. Pardon remembered the first match between the Gentlemen and the Australians more than 40 years on and reckoned it as "perhaps the most memorable in which he [Diver] ever took part". He wrote:

The Australians had to follow on, but they set the Gentlemen 128 to get in the last innings and against Palmer and Giffen, bowling at the top of their form on a worn pitch, the task proved a formidable one. Indeed, the Australians looked to be winning when, with six wickets down and 45 still required, Diver joined A. G. Steel. Rising to the occasion, they hit off the runs without being separated. One can remember the finish as well as if the match had been played last season. Except that Diver put one ball up – it dropped out of reach over Boyle's head at short mid-on – the batting was flawless.

Diver's scores in the game were only 4 and 22 not out. In the return match, which the Australians won, his scores were 20 and 0. His trio of representative matches that season were completed with failure to score in either innings in the Gentlemen v Players game.

For Surrey, Diver's best season was 1885 when he scored 941 runs in first-class matches and made his only century for the team, an innings of 143 against Oxford University. For the 1886 season, however, Diver went on to the Surrey staff as a professional cricketer: he was less successful as a batsman that season, though he did appear for the Players in the Gentlemen v Players fixture, an unusual distinction having played for the Gentlemen in 1884. He scored 25 runs in his only innings, the final day of the match being lost to rain. He did not stay at Surrey after the end of the season however: a note in The Times at the start of the 1887 season reported that he had returned to Cambridge.

== Warwickshire cricketer ==
Diver disappears from cricket records for the four seasons after he left Surrey in 1886, and there are no records of him in minor cricket either. He reappeared in 1891 playing for clubs in the Birmingham area, including the Warwickshire Club and Ground team; he also signed as a professional footballer for Aston Villa, appearing in three first-team matches in the 1891–92 season. In both 1891 and 1892, he played in first-class North v South matches, each time acting as wicketkeeper as well as batsman, and in 1893 he was picked for a "Second Class Counties" eleven which played a first-class match against the Australians.

From 1894, Warwickshire's matches against other first-class cricket teams counted as first-class and the county club began assembling a full professional side: Diver was in the side from the beginning and retired from football to become a professional cricketer again. The first Warwickshire first-class game was a match against Nottinghamshire and Diver was prominent in a Warwickshire victory, though not for the expected reasons. In the Nottinghamshire second innings, Diver took six wickets for 58 runs in 30.3 overs: these were the only wickets Diver took in a first-class career that stretched over 19 years, and he bowled more balls in this single innings than he did in any other complete cricket season. The Birmingham Daily Post was particularly enthusiastic about Diver's bowling. It wrote that he had bowled very well "and should be most serviceable as a change bowler this season." It continued: "His great height gives him every advantage, and the ball delivered right over comes up very fast from the pitch. He bowls well on the offside to his field, and it will surprise us if he does not obtain a good number of wickets in Warwickshire's county matches."

Those hopes were not realised, but Diver settled into an eight-year period in which he was a regular No 3 or middle-order batsman with the Warwickshire side, which competed in the County Championship from the 1895 season. He was not always successful: in 1895, he played in only seven matches and averaged only 12 runs an innings, but later in the 1890s he was the county's leading batsman in some seasons. In 1896, he scored 998 runs at an average of 32.19, and the runs included his first Warwickshire century, an unbeaten innings of 112 made in the match against Essex. In this game he also kept wicket in the absence of the regular Warwickshire wicketkeeper, Dick Lilley, on Test match duty; he also on occasion kept wicket while Lilley's sometimes-effective bowling was used. His best season with the bat in terms of aggregate was 1899, when he scored more than 1000 runs in a season for the only time in his career: 1096 at an average of 29.62. This season produced his highest innings, a score of 184 made out of a total of just 276 on the first day of the match against Leicestershire; Diver had made 121 by lunchtime. It also saw a recall to representative cricket, with an appearance for the Players in the Gentlemen v Players match, though he contributed only seven runs to a total of 647, and selection for a Midland Counties XI against the Australians, when he again failed as a batsman.

The 1900 season was not successful for Diver. He scored just 421 runs in 19 matches for an average of 16.19, and passed 50 just twice. A report at the start of the 1901 season indicates that Diver appeared for practice with the Warwickshire team, though it also states that the County Club was in severe financial difficulties. In the event, Diver played in only one match, the away fixture with Surrey at The Oval, and that was the last game of his first-class career.

== Disappearance and reappearance ==
In November 1901, some explanation for Diver's stuttering end to his cricket career emerged in newspaper reports of a court case in Walsall in which the North Worcestershire Brewery Company petitioned the police court to be allowed to transfer the licence of the Priory Hotel, Walsall, from Diver to his wife, Alice, because Diver had disappeared. Mrs Diver is reported to have told the court that her husband left on 12 November and that "she had not the slightest idea that he was going away". A hotel guest had told her that Diver had been seen at Queenstown taking a ship for New York, but she had not heard from him since his disappearance. The licence was duly transferred temporarily to Mrs Diver, who was reported to have had "considerable experience in the trade"; the police insisted that Diver should not be allowed to hold the licence if he reappeared, and Mrs Diver said that she "would not allow her husband to live at or take part in the management of the house if he came back". A report in February 1902 noted that the transfer of the licence had been made permanent and that Diver's whereabouts were "still unknown".

Diver did not stay disappeared for long. He was formally not re-engaged by Warwickshire for the 1902 season but by August a local newspaper in his home town of Cambridge was reporting that he had been expected to turn out for Cambridgeshire in a fixture against the newly reformed Suffolk side, but had not played; he was described as "engaged at Hunstanton". In 1903, he was a professional at Newport, Monmouthshire and averaged more than 50 runs per innings in topping the averages. He also played in a minor match for a Monmouthshire side, and continued then to play for the county when it joined the Minor Counties in 1905, right through to the First World War outbreak in 1914, acting as a middle-order batsman and frequently as wicketkeeper. He also played in South Wales sides from 1905 to 1907 that played minor matches against the touring teams from Australia, the West Indies and South Africa.

Diver's tangled personal life was tidied up in 1909; his wife, still manager of the Priory Hotel, Walsall, petitioned for divorce on the grounds of desertion and misconduct with a Mrs Ellen Williams, and was granted a decree nisi. Diver had not, she claimed, ever returned to Walsall and nor had he given her any financial support; Mrs Diver was granted custody of the surviving child of the marriage, a daughter, Norah.

Diver remained as a cricket professional and coach at Newport until he moved to Pontardawe, where he was found dead in bed from heart failure on 27 December 1924, aged 63.
