= Robert Turner King =

English cricketer (1824–1884)

Robert Turner King (14 July 1824; Melton Mowbray, Leicestershire – 12 May 1884; Bootle, Lancashire) was an English amateur cricketer who played from 1846 to 1851.

Robert Turner King was educated at Oakham and Emmanuel College, Cambridge. This fast-medium roundarm bowler was mainly associated with Cambridge University and Marylebone Cricket Club (MCC), where he made 45 known appearances. He played for the Gentlemen in the Gentlemen v Players series. He was "far-famed for his wonderful catches as a fielder at 'point'".

King subsequently became a clergyman.
