= 1853 English cricket season =

Cricket season review

The 1853 English cricket season was the 27th of the roundarm era. (Note: Any match listed in the ACS' Important Match Guide (1981) is historically important, and therefore of the highest standard, whether or not a scorecard might exist. The same applies to numerous matches discovered by researchers since 1981. For further information, see First-class cricket.)

== Important matches ==
- 1853 match list

== Leading batsmen ==
J Dean was the leading runscorer with 372 @ 12.82

Other leading batsmen were: TM Adams, W Caffyn, G Parr, W Nicholson, A Haygarth, E Balfour, T Lockyer, J Caesar, J Lillywhite

== Leading bowlers ==
J Grundy was the leading wicket-taker with 87

Other leading bowlers were: J Wisden, J Dean, W Clarke, WR Hillyer, J Bickley, SME Kempson

== Bibliography ==
- ACS (1981). A Guide to Important Cricket Matches Played in the British Isles 1709–1863. Nottingham: ACS. OCLC 85045528.
- Warner, Pelham (1946). Lords: 1787–1945. London: Harrap. OCLC 877106024.
