= Robert Carpenter (cricketer) =

English cricketer

Bob Carpenter
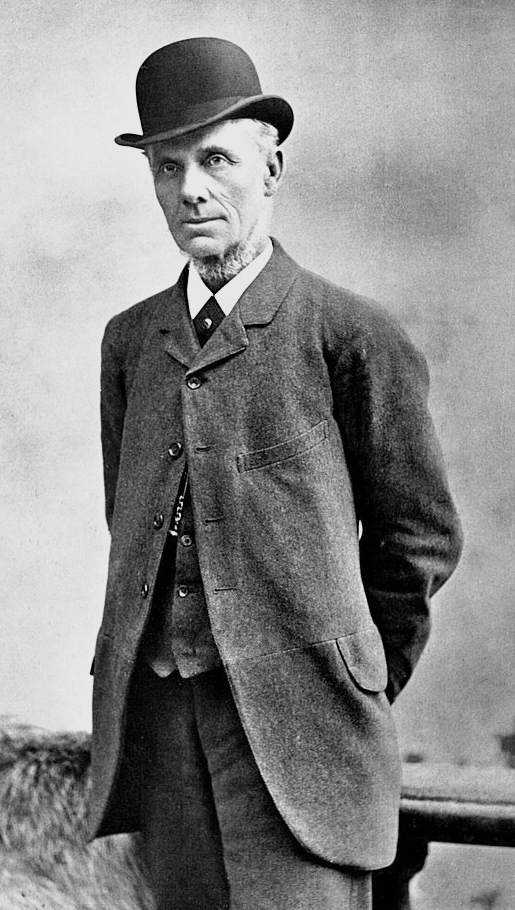
- Carpenter in about 1895

Personal information
- Born: 18 November 1830; Mill Road, Cambridge, England
- Died: 14 July 1901 (aged 70); Cambridge, England
- Batting: Right-handed
- Relatives: Herbert Carpenter (son); George Carpenter (brother); William Carpenter (brother)

Domestic team information
- Years: Team
- 1855–1861: Cambridge Town Club
- 1861–1871: Cambridgeshire

Career statistics
Competition	FC
Matches	141
Runs scored	5,220
Batting average	24.39
100s/50s	4/24
Top score	134
Balls bowled	718
Wickets	19
Bowling average	16.11
5 wickets in innings	0
10 wickets in match	0
Best bowling	4/29
Catches/stumpings	190/2
- Source: CricInfo, 24 November 2019

Robert Pearson Carpenter (18 November 1830 – 14 July 1901) was an English cricketer who played between 1855 and 1876, generally acknowledged to be one of the outstanding batsmen of the 1850s and 1860s. He was a right-handed batsman, usually opening the innings, and an occasional wicketkeeper. He played mostly for Cambridge and Cambridgeshire, the North and the United All England Eleven. In 1859, Carpenter went to North America as a member of the first-ever overseas tour undertaken by the England team and, in 1862–63, was in the England team to Australia and New Zealand. When travelling to Australia, the team travelled from Liverpool to Melbourne on the SS Great Britain. He umpired in two Test matches between England and Australia in the 1880s. His son Herbert played for Essex.

Carpenter's known career spanned the 1855 to 1876 seasons. He scored 5,220 runs in 141 matches with an average of 24.39, making four centuries with a highest score of 134. A noted fielder, he held 190 catches and made two stumpings.

At the end of the 1859 English cricket season, Carpenter was one of the twelve players who took part in cricket's first-ever overseas tour when an England cricket team led by George Parr visited North America. He also toured Australia with Parr in 1863. In the early 1860s, Carpenter and his Cambridgeshire contemporary Thomas Hayward were rated the finest batsmen in England. Richard Daft was among those ranking them as equal first, but George Parr reckoned Carpenter the better of the two. W. G. Grace said of Carpenter that "he may be safely placed as one of the finest of our great batsmen".

Carpenter played in the Gentlemen v Players fixture for the Players on many occasions, scoring centuries in the 1860 and 1861 fixtures at The Oval. In the 1860 match, he hit a ball clean out of The Oval.
