= H. H. Stephenson =

English cricketer

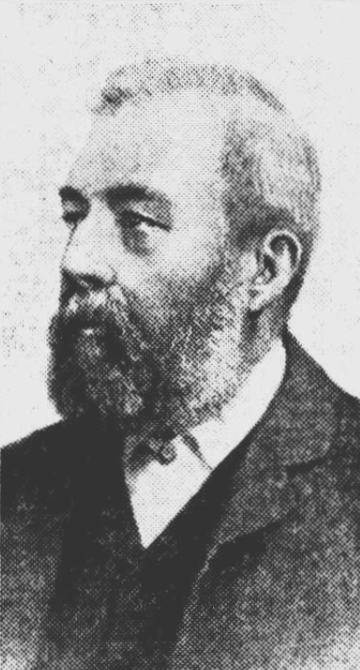
H.H. Stephenson

Heathfield Harman "HH" Stephenson (3 May 1833 in Esher, Surrey – 17 December 1896 in Uppingham, Rutland) was an English cricketer during the game's roundarm era.

Stephenson bowled right-arm fast roundarm, batted right-handed and was an occasional wicket-keeper.

His known career spanned the 1853 to 1871 seasons. He took 303 wickets in 256 matches at 16.37 with a best analysis of 8/28. He had 17 5wI and 4 10wM. He scored 7360 runs at 17.90 with a highest score of 119, making 3 centuries. He took 152 catches and made 25 stumpings.

HH Stephenson was the first cricketer to be awarded a hat for taking three wickets in consecutive balls, the origin of the hat-trick. He performed the feat for the All England Eleven against the twenty-two of Hallam at the Hyde Park ground, Sheffield in 1858. A collection was held for Stephenson (as was customary for outstanding feats by professionals) and he was presented with a cap or hat bought with the proceeds.

At the end of the 1859 English cricket season, Stephenson was one of the 12 players who took part in cricket's first-ever overseas tour when an England cricket team led by George Parr visited North America.

In the 1861-62 Australian first-class cricket season, Stephenson captained England, sponsored by Messrs Spiers and Pond, on the inaugural tour of Australia. The team travelled to Australia on the SS Great Britain. He is the first player featured on a mural in the Melbourne Cricket Ground (MCG) pavilion showing many of the famous cricketers who have played on that ground.

Stephenson was an occasional umpire after his playing career ended. He is known to have umpired 14 matches from 1866 to 1882. One of them was the inaugural Test match in England at The Oval in 1880. Until shortly before his death, he was coach at Uppingham School. He is buried in the town.

== External sources ==
- CricketArchive
