= Alfred Diver =

English cricketer

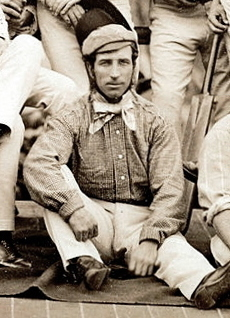
- Diver with the England in North America team in 1859

Personal information
- Born: 6 July 1823; Cambridge, England
- Died: 25 March 1876 (aged 52); Rugby, Warwickshire, England
- Batting: Right-handed
- Bowling: Right-arm fast-medium

Domestic team information
- Years: Team
- 1843–1855: Cambridge Town Club
- 1850: Middlesex
- 1857–1866: Cambridgeshire
- 1858: Nottinghamshire

Alfred John Day Diver (6 July 1823 – 25 March 1876) was an English cricketer whose career spanned the 1843 season to the 1866 season. Diver played mainly for Cambridge Town Club and the All England Eleven

Popularly known as "Ducky", Diver is best known as a reliable batsman. Following the 1859 English cricket season, he was one of the 12-strong party of English players who toured North America. Led by George Parr, this was the first overseas cricket tour.

His nephew, Edwin Diver, played over 200 important matches, mostly for Surrey and Warwickshire.

== External sources ==
- Media related to Alfred Diver at Wikimedia Commons
- Alfred Diver at ESPNcricinfo
