= William Caffyn =

English cricketer (1828–1919)

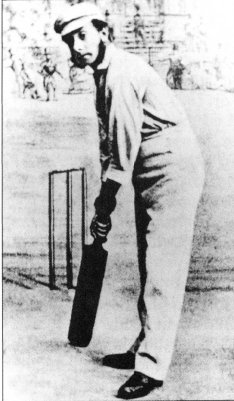
William Caffyn

William Caffyn (2 February 1828 – 28 August 1919) was an English cricketer who played mainly for Surrey. He played in over 200 important matches, 89 of them for Surrey. He made five appearances for New South Wales, two for Kent and one for Lancashire as well as appearing five times for the Marylebone Cricket Club.

Caffyn was born in Reigate in Surrey in 1828 and died in 1919 aged 91 in the town.

== Surrey and England ==
Caffyn was a genuine all-rounder: a middle-order right-handed batsman and an effective right-arm medium-fast roundarm bowler. He played a major part in the success of Surrey during the 1850s.

Caffyn's known career extended from 1849 to 1873. He took 602 wickets in his 200 matches at an average of 13.47 runs each, with a best analysis of nine wickets for the cost of 29 runs (9/29). He took five wickets in an innings 49 times and 10 wickets in a match 11 times. He scored 5,885 runs at an average of 17.99 runs per innings, with a highest score of 103, one of his two centuries. In 1860 whilst employed as a professional at Winchester College he played and beat an XI of the Town of Winchester single handed by 28 runs. Caffyn made scores of 35 and 1, and with two men fielding for him he bowled out the opposition for 4 and 4.

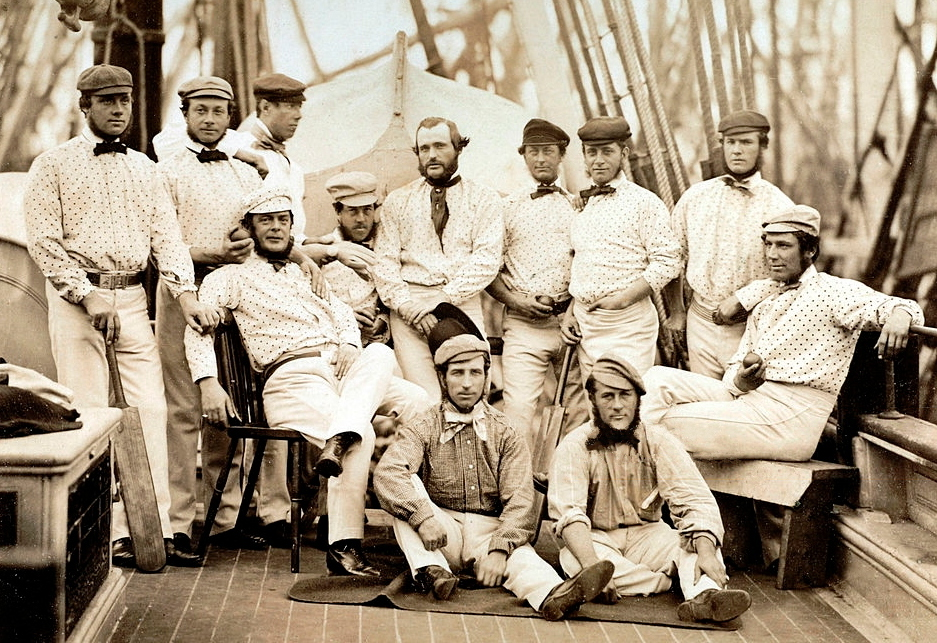
The first English touring team pictured on board ship at Liverpool. Caffyn is standing second from left.

At the end of the 1859 English cricket season, Caffyn was one of the 12 players who took part in cricket's first-ever overseas tour when an England cricket team led by George Parr visited North America.

== Influence in Australia ==
Caffyn was instrumental in the early development of Australian cricket and the establishment of Anglo-Australian competition. He first came to Australia with a sponsored team which consisted of mainly Surrey cricketers in 1861/62, visiting again in 1863/64. For both of these trips, Caffyn and the team travelled to Melbourne on the SS Great Britain. Following his 1864 visit he remained in Australia as coach of the Melbourne Cricket Club.

After a period in Melbourne, he moved to Sydney, where he started a hairdressing business with his wife and coached at the Warwick Club. During this time he was closely associated with fellow ex-Surrey professional cricketer Charles Lawrence who coached at the Albert Cricket Club in Sydney.

In his book Seventy-one Not Out he wrote:

The cricket out there in the ten years that have elapsed between the first visit of an English eleven and my leaving the country had made phenomenal improvement... It is a source of the greatest satisfaction to me that I have in some measure contributed to the successful state of things.

Caffyn has the distinction of bowling the first ball in the first match between a team from England and one from Australia at the Melbourne Cricket Ground. The match took place on New Year's Day 1862, and saw his visiting England up against a Victorian XVIII. He also played in the first Anglo-Australian important match, played from 1 March 1862 and dubbed The World v Surrey, also at the MCG. The first Test match was not played until 1877, 15 years later.

== Later life ==
He returned to England in 1871 and played for Surrey a few times in 1872 and 1873. He was awarded an annual payment by the club before retiring to live in Reigate. He died at his home in Surrey in 1919 at the age of 91. His house still remains at 'Sydneyville', 20 Parkgate Road, Reigate, unaltered from the time he resided there, the name a testament to his time in Australia.

John Arlott recognised the importance of his book of reminiscences Seventy-one Not out, edited by "Mid-On". Arlott wrote: "...despite its literary limitations, Seventy-one Not out is an essential book for anyone who wants to understand the history of cricket."

== Bibliography ==
- Carlaw, Derek (2020). Kent County Cricketers, A to Z: Part One (1806–1914) (PDF). Cardiff: ACS.
