= John Wisden =

English cricketer

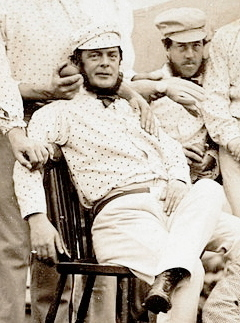
- Wisden in the England team to North America in 1859

Personal information
- Full name: John Wisden
- Born: 5 September 1826; Brighton, Sussex, England
- Died: 5 April 1884 (aged 57); Westminster, London, England
- Height: 5 ft 4 in (1.63 m)
- Batting: Right-handed
- Bowling: Underarm right arm slow
- Role: Bowler

Domestic team information
- Years: Team
- 1845–1863: Sussex
- 1854: Kent
- 1859–1863: Middlesex

Career statistics
Competition	First-class
Matches	187
Runs scored	4,140
Batting average	14.12
100s/50s	2/9
Top score	148
Balls bowled	24,205
Wickets	1,109
Bowling average	10.32
5 wickets in innings	111
10 wickets in match	39
Best bowling	10/58
Catches/stumpings	169/1
- Source: CricketArchive, 15 August 2022

John Wisden (5 September 1826 – 5 April 1884) was an English cricketer who played 187 first-class cricket matches for three English county cricket teams, Kent, Middlesex and Sussex. He is now best known for launching the eponymous Wisden Cricketers' Almanack in 1864, the year after he retired from first-class cricket.

== Early life ==
Wisden was born in Crown Street, Brighton. His father, William, was a builder. He attended Brighton's Middle Street School (formerly the Royal Union School, founded as a charity school in 1805). He moved to London after his father died, and lived with the wicket-keeper Tom Box.

== Cricket ==
In July 1845, aged 18, only 5 ft 4 in and weighing just 7 stone (44 kg), he made his first-class debut for Sussex against MCC, taking 6 wickets in the first innings and three in the second. He joined the All England Eleven in 1846, moving allegiance to the United All England Eleven in 1852. He was engaged to marry George Parr's sister Annie in 1849, but she died before the wedding, and he never married.

Initially a fast roundarm bowler, before overarm bowling was permitted, his pace slowed in later years so he bowled medium pace; he also bowled slow underarm. While bowling fast, he took on average nearly 10 wickets in each game. In 1850, when he was playing for the North against the South at Lord's, his off-cutter technique won him 10 wickets in the second innings, all clean bowled (still the only instance of all ten wickets being taken "bowled" in any first-class match). He was also a competent batsman, and scored two first-class centuries, the first, exactly 100, against Kent at Tunbridge Wells in 1849, and in 1855 he notched up 148 against Yorkshire, the only first-class century scored in 1855.

He played almost all of his cricket in England, mostly for Sussex, but once for Kent and thrice for Middlesex. He travelled with a touring team led by George Parr to Canada and the US in 1859, where eight matches in Montreal, Hoboken, Philadelphia, Hamilton and Rochester were won easily.

Of moderate height, he was nicknamed the "Little Wonder" after the winner of The Derby in 1840, and later the "Cardinal". He was said to be the best all-rounder of his day. In all, he took 1,109 first-class wickets with a bowling average of 10.32. He scored 4,140 first-class runs with a batting average of 14.12, an average which was very good for the time.

== Business career and legacy ==
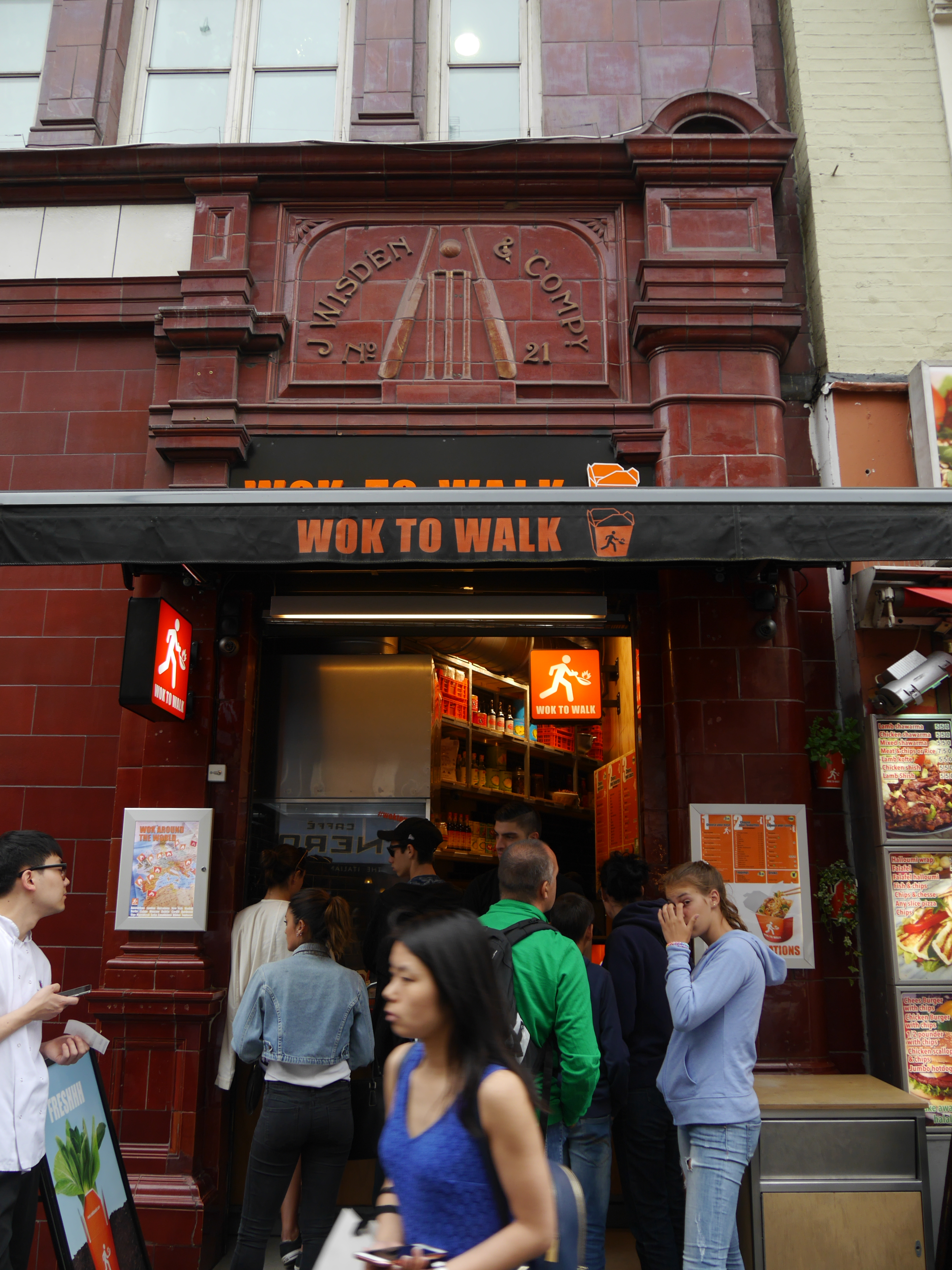
J Wisden & Company, 21 Cranbourn Street, London

Wisden began a cricket-equipment business in Leamington Spa in 1850 and five years later opened a "cricket and cigar" shop in Coventry Street near The Haymarket in central London, in partnership with Fred Lillywhite until 1858. He was also the cricket coach at Harrow School from 1852 to 1855, and owned The Cricketers, a public house at Duncton in Sussex.

He retired from cricket in 1863 at the relatively early age of 37 as a result of rheumatism, and started publishing his annual Cricketers' Almanack the following year. The first edition may have been based on a diary written in 1863 by Francis Emilius Cary Elwes, which came to light in 2016. According to Robert Winder, who wrote a history of the almanack, evidence from the diary indicates that there was a connection between the two men and that Wisden saw Elwes' work, but no definitive conclusion on the matter can be reached.

He also published in Cricket and How to Play It in 1866. In retirement, he developed his business into a manufacturer and retailer of equipment for many sports, not just cricket. The shop moved to Cranbourn Street near Leicester Square in 1872.

After his death the business grew into a major international sports brand, receiving a Royal Warrant in 1911 as "Athletic Outfitters to the King". The business went into receivership in 1939, and was acquired in 1943 by a Co-operative society, which sold it on to Grays of Cambridge in 1970. Grays then ceased to use Wisden as an equipment brand, but re-established John Wisden & Co as the publisher of the Cricketers' Almanack. It is now an imprint of Wisden's owner, Bloomsbury Publishing Plc.

== Death ==
Wisden died of cancer, at the age of 57, in the flat above his Cranbourn Street shop (next to Leicester Square tube station). He was buried in Brompton Cemetery, London.

In 1913, 29 years after his death, he was the subject of a "Special Portrait" in the 50th edition of Wisden, replacing the usual Wisden Cricketers of the Year feature which was dropped from that edition. In 1984, a headstone was placed at his grave to mark the centenary of his death.
