= George Parr (cricketer) =

English cricketer

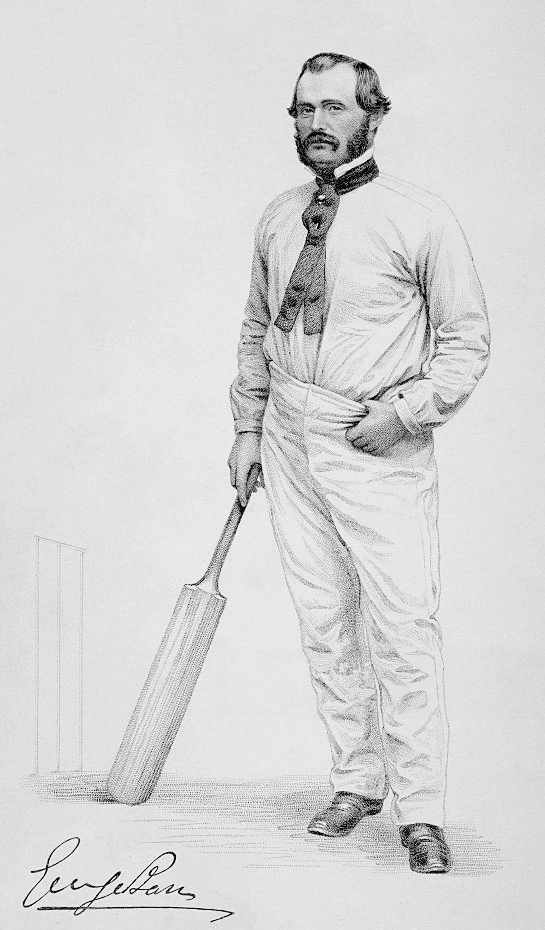

Personal information
- Full name: George Parr
- Born: 22 May 1826; Radcliffe-on-Trent, Nottinghamshire, England
- Died: 23 June 1891 (aged 65); Radcliffe-on-Trent, Nottinghamshire, England
- Nickname: Lion of the North
- Height: 5 ft 9 in (1.75 m)
- Batting: Right-handed
- Role: Batsman

Domestic team information
- Years: Team
- 1845–1870: Nottinghamshire
- 1853–1854: Surrey
- 1853–1854: Sussex
- 1854–1858: Kent
- 1863: Marylebone Cricket Club (MCC)

Career statistics
Competition
Matches	207
Runs scored	6,626
Batting average	20.20
100s/50s	1/31
Top score	130
Balls bowled	694
Wickets	29
Bowling average	15.34
5 wickets in innings	1
10 wickets in match	0
Best bowling	6/42
Catches/stumpings	126/–
- Source: CricInfo, 21 June 2014

George Parr (22 May 1826 – 23 June 1891) was an English cricketer whose career lasted from 1844 to 1870. Known popularly as the "Lion of the North", Parr was a right-handed batsman and bowled occasional right-handed underarm deliveries. Throughout his career he played mainly for Nottinghamshire, and was club captain from 1856 to 1870. He also made occasional appearances for other counties and for Marylebone Cricket Club. He was a stalwart of the All England Eleven (AEE) and was captain of the first England touring team, which went to North America in 1859. He also captained England's second tour to Australia and New Zealand in 1864, returning home unbeaten. During this trip he travelled with the team from Liverpool to Melbourne on the SS Great Britain.

Parr played in 207 matches and had 358 innings, in 30 of which he was not out. Parr is widely acknowledged to have been the best batsman in England in his time. He scored 6,626 runs (average 20.20) at a time when conditions greatly favoured bowlers. His highest score was 130 for Nottinghamshire, against Surrey at The Oval on 14 July 1859; his only century. He made 31 fifties and took 126 catches. He took 29 wickets in his career with a best analysis of 6/42. The Parr Stand which was replaced at Trent Bridge was named in his honour.

Sporting positions
Preceded by William Clarke	Nottinghamshire County cricket captain 1856–1870	Succeeded by Richard Daft
