= List of Kent county cricketers to 1842 =

This is a list (not necessarily complete) of cricketers who played for Kent to the end of the 1842 season. There had been attempts to form a Kent county club at Coxheath in 1787, and at Town Malling between 1835 and 1841, but both ventures failed. In August 1842, during the annual Canterbury Cricket Week, the Beverley Cricket Club reconstituted itself as a county club. The Beverley team played its first historically important match against England (i.e., the "rest" of England), at White Hart Field in Bromley, between 25 and 27 August 1842. Subsequently, a second county club was founded at Maidstone in 1859, and the two merged in 1870 to form the present Kent County Cricket Club. This list includes Kent players who took part in important matches before 25 August 1842. Many of the players appeared for other teams besides Kent, including the East and West Kent teams, and the amateur Gentlemen of Kent team. During the 18th century, team names were uncertain because patrons tended to vary the nomenclature. For example, it is well understood that teams formed by such as Edwin Stead, the Duke of Dorset, or Sir Horatio Mann were essentially Kent, even with given men, and players who were members of those teams are included here. Many of the names are linked to biographical articles.

Where there is no link, the intention is to provide some brief information such as a date, or a team name if not Kent. For example, Samson Baker played for Kent in 1823, and S. Bartram played for Dorset's XI in 1769.

== Key ==
- † preceding a player's name means that the original article is now a redirect to this list.

== A ==
- Tom Adams (1836–1858)
- Benjamin Aislabie (1823)
- Allen (1747)
- Stephen Amherst (1786–1795)
- William Ashby (1815–1829)
- Robert Ayling (1796)
- William Ayling (1806)
- James Aylward (1779–1793)

== B ==
- James Bray Baker (1825–1826)
- Samson Baker (1823)
- William de Chair Baker (1841–1853)
- Henry Barnard (1815–1823)
- John Barnard (1815–1822)
- William Barton (1796)
- Bartram (1744)
- S. Bartram (Dorset's XI, 1769)
- Bates (1789)
- Horace Bates (1823–1826)
- Thomas Battersbee (1822)
- Emilius Bayley (1842–1844)
- John Bayton (1776)
- Lord Frederick Beauclerk (1806)
- William Bedle (1700s to c. 1720s)
- William Bedster (1781–1792)
- Billy Beldham (1792–1806)
- John Bell (1747–1759)
- Thomas Bell (1747–1759)
- George Betts (1835)
- Edward Bligh (1790–1806)
- Birchett (1768)
- Bishop (Dorset's XI, 1769)
- Francis Booker (1773–1788)
- John Boorman (1776–1790)
- John Bowra (1739–1749)
- William Bowra (1775–1788)
- Thomas Boxall (1789–1796)
- Thomas Brandon (1750–1759)
- James Bray (1826)
- William Brazier (1774–1792)
- Jem Broadbridge (1828)
- Brobham (1768)
- T. Browning (1795)
- William Browning (1795)
- James Bryant (1744–1751)
- John Bryant (1743–1756)
- William Bullen (1774–1796)
- Burchwood (1759)
- John Burgess (1794)
- Peter Burrell (1788–1789)
- Anthony Burton (1822)
- Stephen Butcher (1790–1793)

== C ==
- Caesar (1828)
- Will Caldecourt (1827–1828)
- Thomas Calhoun (1827)
- Lewis Carrick (1828)
- Church (1789–1795)
- George Claridge (1827–1829)
- Robert Clifford (1779–1792)
- William Clifford (1834–1841)
- John Cocker (1842)
- John Colchin (1748–1749)
- Robert Colchin (1743–1749)
- Samuel Colchin (1774–1776)
- J. Cole (1784–1788)
- Collier (1786)
- Couchman (1786)
- Cox (Amherst's XI, 1789)
- John Crawte (1789–1792)
- Henry Crosoer (1786–1789)
- Charles Cumberland (1793)
- John Cutbush (1743–1744)

== D ==
- Danes (1744)
- James Dark (1827)
- Earl of Darnley (1790–1796)
- John Brewer Davis (1773)
- James Davis (1828)
- Dean (Mann's XI, 1789)
- John Deedes (1822–1828)
- William Deedes (1822–1823)
- David Denne (1823)
- John Dicker (1840)
- Alban Dorrinton (1836)
- William Dorrinton (1836–1848)
- Duke of Dorset (1773–1783)
- Captain Drew (1795)
- John Dudlow (1841)
- Timothy Duke (1823–1828)
- John Dyke (1822)
- Percyvall Dyke (1823–1828)
- Thomas Dyke (1827)

== E ==
- Robert Eures (1747–1752)
- John Evans (1822–1823)

== F ==
- Frederick Fagge (1834–1851)
- Nicholas Felix (1834–1852)
- William Fennex (1787–1792)
- Richard Fielder (1792–1796)
- Finch (1786)
- Jasper Fish (1773)
- John Frame (1773)
- Richard Francis (1782–1788)
- Andrew Freemantle (1790–1793)
- French (Darnley's XI, 1790)
- James Fuggles (1773)

== G ==
- C. Gardiner (1828)
- Garrett (1750–1751)
- Gibson (1780)
- Golding (Bourne, 1768)
- Goldstone (Dartford, 1759)
- Goodhew (1791–1795)
- N. Graham (1792)
- Green (1828)
- William Green (1841–1842)
- Greenstreet (1788)
- Grinstead (1788)

== H ==
- Hammond (Dartford, 1775)
- John Hammond (1794–1806)
- Henry Hampton (1806)
- Thomas Harden (1829)
- Archibald Harenc (1840)
- Charles Harenc (1834–1848)
- David Harris (1792)
- Isaac Hatch (1786)
- Robert Hills (1836–1838)
- Thomas Hills (1840)
- William Hillyer (1835–1853)
- Hines (1822)
- Joseph Hitches (Colchin's XI, 1749)
- Hodges (1781)
- William Hodsoll (1743–1752)
- Hogben (1781–1782)
- William Hollis (1841)
- Holness (1781)
- Hooker (1795)
- J. Hopper (1822–1827)
- Richard Hosmer (1782–1788)
- Howard (1745–1752)
- Edward Hussey (1773–1796)

== J ==
- James Jardine (1827)
- Herbert Jenner (1827–1836)
- Johnson (Mann's XI, 1789)
- Jones (Hadlow, 1745–1752)
- James Jordan (1822–1823)
- Thomas Jure (1747–1749)

== K ==
- Killick (Dartford, 1759)
- Killick (Amherst's XI, 1789)
- George Kipps (1744–1747)
- Henry Knatchbull (1827–1848)
- Edward Knight (1822–1828)
- George Knight (1827–1828)

== L ==
- William Lambert (1806)
- Henry Thomas Lane (1823)
- John Larkin (1747–1749)
- Robert Lascoe (1745–1748)
- Lawrence (Mann's XI, 1777)
- John Leaney (1825–1826)
- William Leaney (1815)
- John Lefeaver (1841–1854)
- Stephen Lefeaver (1825)
- Richard Leigh Jr (1806)
- Lintoft (Dartford, 1775)
- George Louch (1773–1792)
- Love (Bourne, 1768)
- Luck (1793)

== M ==
- Mandy (1768)
- Horatio Mann (1773)
- John Mansfield (1747–1754)
- Marclew (1795)
- Will Martingell (1841–1852)
- Stephen Masters (1815)
- Richard May (1773–1779)
- Thomas May (1773)
- William May (1834)
- John Mayers (1827)
- Henry Mayne (1835–1844)
- Joseph Miller (1773–1783)
- Mills (1744; brother of John Mills)
- Charles Mills (1840)
- George Mills (1825–1829)
- John Mills (1744)
- Richard Mills (1825–1843)
- John Minshull (1773)
- George Monson (1792)
- Muddle (1768)
- Alfred Mynn (1834–1859)
- Walter Mynn (1835–1848)

== N ==
- Richard Newman (1773)
- Nicholson (1788)
- John Noakes (1826)
- Thomas Nordish (1815–1823)
- George Warde Norman (1834–1836)
- Henry Norman (1827–1835)
- John Nyren (1787)

== O ==
- Oakley (Mann's XI, 1777)
- Oliver (Dorset's XI, 1769)
- Henry Ommaney (1828)
- Cyril Onslow (1841)

== P ==
- Palmer (Amherst's XI, 1789)
- W. Palmer (1789–1795; amateur player)
- Will Palmer (1776)
- Henry Parker (1841)
- Parr (Chatham, 1754)
- Thomas Pattenden (1773–1783)
- William Pattenden (1786)
- Tom Peake (1743–1749)
- Pennell (1777–1781)
- Fuller Pilch (1836–1854)
- William Pilch (1840–1854) (Note: William Pilch played for Kent in 1840, but not again till 1845, after the county club was formed. He had moved to Kent to live with his uncle.)
- John Pilcher (1787–1796)
- Uriah Pillion (1828)
- Potter (Dartford, 1759)
- Charles Prickett (1826)
- Purcell (1829)
- Richard Purchase (1793)
- Puttoo (Mann's XI, 1789)

== R ==
- Rawlings (1750–1751)
- Thomas Razell (1815)
- Charles Reed (1798–1810)
- Reid (1828)
- Benjamin Remington (1779–1781)
- Michael Remington (1781)
- Thomas Remington (1781)
- Richardson (Dartford, 1775)
- George Ring (1796)
- Joey Ring (1782–1796)
- Robert Robinson (1795)
- Charles Rocke (1828)
- Val Romney (1743–1751)
- Batchelor Roper (1835)

== S ==
- Lord Charles Sackville (1734)
- Lord John Philip Sackville (1734–1745)
- Sandham (Dartford, 1775)
- James Saunders (1827)
- William Sawyer (1744)
- Scudamore (Dartford, 1775)
- William Searle (1827–1829)
- Thomas Selby (1839–1841)
- Shearcy (Dorset's XI, 1769)
- Richard Simmons (1768–1779)
- Edward Sivewright (1828)
- Jack Small (1795)
- James Smith (1792–1793)
- William Smith (1840–1857)
- T. Southam (Colchin's XI, 1749)
- Stephen Southon (1825–1826)
- John Sparks (1822)
- Richard Stanford (1786–1787)
- Edwin Stead (1724–1731)
- William Stearman (1836–1840)
- Stephens (Dartford, 1751–1759)
- Lumpy Stevens (1774–1782)
- Stone (1751)
- Robert Stone (1790)
- Lord Strathavon (1827–1836)

== T ==
- G. Talbot (1789)
- L. Taylor (Mann's XI, 1789)
- Charles Templeton (1829)
- Terry (Dartford, 1775)
- Richard Thomas (1835)
- Edward Thwaites (1825–1826)
- Charles Town (1815–1823)
- Townsend (1786)
- Chauncy Hare Townshend (1827)
- Henry Tufton (1794–1796)
- John Tufton (1796)
- Sackville Tufton, 9th Earl of Thanet (1791–1794)
- Thomas Turney (1828)

== U ==
- John Unstead (1825)
- William Usmar (1841)

== V ==
- Richard Aubrey Veck (1779)
- Venner (1789–1790)

== W ==
- Wakelin (Dartford, 1759)
- Walker (1822)
- Tom Walker (1792)
- Waller (1774)
- William Walton (1828)
- Ward (Bourne, 1768)
- John Ward (1806)
- Webb (1781)
- Weller (Dorset's XI, 1777)
- John Wells (1792)
- Charles Wenman (1828)
- Ned Wenman (1825–1854)
- George Wenman (1825–1834)
- John Wenman (1825–1837)
- John Wheeler (1773)
- Thomas Whitby (1837)
- Charles Whittaker (1839–1847)
- White (1790)
- Thomas White (1772)
- Whiting (Dorset's XI, 1769)
- Wilden (1751)
- George Finch, 9th Earl of Winchilsea (1792–1794)
- John Willes (1806–1822)
- William Willes (1815)
- Edward Winter (1796)
- Wood (1828–1829)
- John Wood (1772–1783) (Note: John Wood was a bowler from Seal. His known career spanned the 1772–1783 seasons. In the primary sources, he was often confused with his namesake John Wood of Surrey, who was an all-rounder, and other players called either Wood or Woods.)

== Y ==
- William Yalden (1781–1783)

== See also ==
- List of Kent County Cricket Club players
- List of Gentlemen of Kent cricketers

== Bibliography ==
- Birley, Derek (1999). A Social History of English Cricket. London: Aurum Press. ISBN 978-18-54107-10-7 – via Internet Archive.
- Buckley, G. B. (1935). Fresh Light on 18th Century Cricket. Birmingham: Cotterell & Co. OCLC 23450280.
- Carlaw, Derek (2020). Kent County Cricketers, A to Z: Part One (1806–1914) (PDF). Cardiff: ACS.
- Denison, William (1846). Cricket: Sketches of the Players. London: Simpkin, Marshall and Co. OCLC 55776033.
- Haygarth, Arthur (1996) [1862]. Scores & Biographies, Volume 1 (1744–1826). Kennington: Frederick Lillywhite. ISBN 978-19-00592-23-9.
- Pycroft, James (1952) [1907]. "The Hambledon Club and the Old Players". In Lucas, E. V. (ed.). The Hambledon Men. London: Sportsman's Book Club. OCLC 500497384 – via Wikisource.
- Milton, Howard (1999). Bat and Ball Gravesend: A First-class Cricket History. Gravesend: Gravesend Cricket Club. ISBN 978-09-53604-10-4.
- Milton, Howard; Francis, Peter (2020). Kent County Cricket Grounds. Worthing: Pitch Publishing. ISBN 978-17-85316-61-6.
- Moore, Dudley (1998). The History of Kent County Cricket Club. London: Christopher Helm. ISBN 978-07-47022-09-1.
- Rajan, Amol (2011). Twirlymen: The Unlikely History of Cricket's Greatest Spin Bowlers. London: Yellow Jersey Press. ISBN 978-02-24083-23-2.
- Underdown, David (2000). Start of Play. Westminster: Allen Lane. ISBN 978-07-13993-30-1 – via Internet Archive.
- Waghorn, H. T. (2005) [1906]. The Dawn of Cricket. London: J. W. McKenzie. ISBN 978-09-47821-17-3.
