= List of people from Benenden =

This is a list of people from Benenden, Kent, England.

== Born in Benenden ==
- Aidan Crawley (1908–93), journalist and MP.
- John Grimston, (born 1951) British peer.
- Dora Honnywill (1870–1959), Olympic archer.
- Edward Leeds (died 1589) clergyman.
- Brian Moore (1932–2001), football commentator

=== Cricketers ===
- Edmund Hinkly (1817–1880), cricketer
- John Mayers (1801–65), cricketer.
- George Mills (1793–1865), cricketer.
- Richard Mills (1798–1882), cricketer.
- Stephen Southon (1806–1880), cricketer
- Charles Wenman (1797 – after 1841), cricketer.
- George Wenman 1805–37), cricketer.
- John Wenman (1803–77), cricketer.
- William Wenman (1832–1921), cricketer

== People connected with Benenden ==
- Anthony Barker (1880–1963), artist, lived in Benenden.
- Anthony Beattie (1944–2014), civil servant, lives in Benenden.
- Jo Brand (1957–), comedian, lived in Benenden as a child.
- Kitty Fisher (d 1767), courtesan, lived in Benenden.
- Andrew Gardner (1932–1999), newsreader, lived in Benenden.
- Benjamin Haughton (1865–1924) landscape artist, lived near Benenden.
- Lady Victoria Hervey (born 1976), an English model, taught at Benenden School.
- Collingwood Ingram (1880–1981), ornithologist and horticulturalist, lived in Benenden.
- George Miles (1913–88), organist, was curate of St. George's Church, Benenden 1919–22.
- Charles Marriott Oldrid Scott (1880–1952), architect, worked on worked on Benenden School Hall in 1938
- James Tinling (1900–83), partner in Power Jets Ltd, resided in Benenden at the time of his death.
- Philip Turbett (1961–), musician and teacher, taught at Benenden School.

== See also ==
- List of people educated at Benenden School
