= Wenman =

Wenman can refer to:

- Viscount Wenman, noble title

== People ==
=== Family name ===
- Charles Wenman (born 1797), English cricketer who played for Kent
- Charles Wenman (theatre) (c. 1876–1954), Australian theatre manager and producer
- Diana Wenman, American television director and editor
- Francis Wenman (1599–1640), English politician
- Henry Wenman (1875–1953), British actor
- John Wenman (1803–1877), English cricketer, cousin of Ned
- Ned Wenman (1803–1879), English cricketer
- Richard Wenman (disambiguation), several people:

- Richard Wenman (MP for Northampton) (1524-73), MP for Northampton (UK Parliament constituency)
- Richard Wenman, 1st Viscount Wenman (1573–1640), English landowner, MP for Oxfordshire
- Richard Wenman, 4th Viscount Wenman (1657–1690), English landowner, MP for Brackley and Oxfordshire
- Richard Wenman, 5th Viscount Wenman (1688–1729), English landowner, Viscount Wenman
- Richard Wenman (Nova Scotia politician) (c. 1712–1781), Nova Scotia merchant and politician

- Robert Wenman (1940–1995), Canadian politician
- Thomas Wenman (disambiguation)
- Wenman Bassett-Lowke (c. 1877-1953), English toymaker specializing in producing construction sets, model railways, boats and ships.
- William Wenman (1832–1921), English cricketer, son of Ned

=== Given name ===
- Wenman Coke (died 1776), MP for Norfolk.
- The Honourable Wenman Coke (1828–1907), British soldier and MP, grandson of the above.

== Places ==
- Wenman Island is another name for Wolf Island, one of the Galapagos Islands.
