= George Wenman =

English cricketer (1805–1837)

Personal information
- Born: 27 October 1805; Benenden, Kent
- Died: 19 January 1837 (aged 31); Brookland, Kent
- Batting: Left-handed
- Role: Batsman
- Relatives: John Wenman (brother); Ned Wenman (cousin); Charles Wenman (cousin)

Domestic team information
- Years: Team
- 1825–1834: Kent

George Wenman (27 October 1805 – 19 January 1837) was an English cricketer who played from 1825 to 1834.

== Family ==
Wenman was born at Benenden in Kent in 1805, the son of John and Elizabeth Wenman (née Gude), and was a member of the Wenman family, a number of whom were cricketers; his older brother John Wenman and cousins Charles and Ned Wenman (Note: Ned Wenman played for Kent between 1825 and 1854. He was an innovative wicket-keeper and a major force in the growth of the early Kent County Cricket Club which dominated English cricket through the 1840s.) all played for Kent in the early 19th century. Wenman is known to have played village cricket for Benenden, at that point one of the best teams in England, from 1822; a number of family members, including his uncle, also played for the team. As well as his home village, Wenman played village cricket for Hawkhurst, another strong club team, (Note: Hawkhurst is less than 4 miles (6.4 km) from Benenden and the match included a number of players from the local area. The Hawkhurt club was also one of the strongest clubs in England during the early 19th century and often consisted primarily of Benenden players.) and Leeds.

== Career ==
Wenman made his debut in June 1825 for Kent against Sussex on Hawkhurst Moor. (Note: The 1825 match against Sussex, as well as another match the same year and two in 1826, were organised by the Hawkhurst club and mark a return to matches between two county teams.) He played in a total of nine important matches, including five for Kent, making his final appearances in 1834 when he played twice for Kent against England (i.e., the "rest" of England), once for England against Sussex, and once for the Players against the Gentlemen. In his nine important matches he scored a total of 66 runs, with a highest score of 19 not out made against Sussex 1829.

Professionally Wenman was a grocer and linen draper at Brookland, Kent. He died there in 1837 aged 31 and is buried at Benenden.

== Bibliography ==
- Carlaw, Derek (2020). Kent County Cricketers, A to Z: Part One (1806–1914) (PDF). Cardiff: ACS.
- Lewis, Paul (2014). For Kent and Country. Eastbourne: Reveille Press. ISBN 978-19-08336-63-7.
- Milton, Howard (1999). Bat and Ball Gravesend: A First-class Cricket History. Gravesend: Gravesend Cricket Club. ISBN 978-09-53604-10-4.
- Milton, Howard; Francis, Peter (2020). Kent County Cricket Grounds. Worthing: Pitch Publishing. ISBN 978-17-85316-61-6.
- Moore, Dudley (1998). The History of Kent County Cricket Club. London: Christopher Helm. ISBN 978-07-47022-09-1.
