= Prickett =

Prickett is an English surname of Anglo-Saxon origins. It may refer to:

- Charles Prickett (1796–1866), English cricketer
- Clyde Prickett (born 1932), American racing driver
- Henry E. Prickett (1829–1885), American politician
- Maudie Prickett (1914–1976), American actress
- Richard Prickett (1777–1847), Michigan pioneer
- Thomas Prickett (1914–2010), Royal Air Force officer

== See also ==
- Abacuk Pricket, English sailor
- Prickett's Fort State Park, a West Virginia state park
