= Francis Clifford (cricketer) =

English cricketer

Personal information
- Full name: Francis Seath Clifford
- Born: 17 December 1822; Bearsted, Kent
- Died: 17 November 1869 (aged 46); Gravesend, Kent
- Batting: Right-handed
- Role: Wicket-keeper
- Relatives: William Clifford (brother); Robert Clifford (grandfather)

Domestic team information
- Years: Team
- 1849–1860: Kent
- FC debut: 28 May 1849 Kent v Yorkshire XI
- Last FC: 14 June 1860 Kent v Marylebone Cricket Club (MCC)

Career statistics
Competition	First-class
Matches	53
Runs scored	907
Batting average	10.30
100s/50s	0/2
Top score	60*
Catches/stumpings	24/8
- Source: CricInfo, 1 June 2022

Francis Seath Clifford (17 December 1822 – 17 November 1869) was an English cricketer who played for Kent County Cricket Club between 1849 and 1860.

Clifford was born at Bearsted in Kent in 1822, the son of Robert and Catherine Clifford. He lived at Gravesend for most of his life and played club cricket for Gravesend Cricket Club. His older brother William played for Kent teams before the county club was established in 1842 and his grandfather, Robert Clifford, had played for Kent in the late 18th century.

Described as "an excellent wicket-keeper", Clifford made his first-class cricket debut for Kent in 1849 against Yorkshire at Hyde Park in Sheffield. He initially played when Ned Wenman or William Dorrinton, Kent's established wicket-keepers, were unable to play, but after 1851 played as a specialist batsman who was noted as one who played on the front foot at a time when this was less common. He played in a total of 53 first-class matches, almost all of them for Kent: he played twice for England (i.e., the "rest" of England) and for the South against the North, and once for the Players against the Gentlemen in 1854.

Clifford worked in a variety of professions, including as a tailor, an undertaker and as a publican in Gravesend. He married Sarah King in 1825; the couple had two children. He died at Gravesend in 1869 aged 46.

== Bibliography ==
- Carlaw, Derek (2020). Kent County Cricketers, A to Z: Part One (1806–1914) (PDF). Cardiff: ACS.
- Lewis, Paul (2014). For Kent and Country. Eastbourne: Reveille Press. ISBN 978-19-08336-63-7.
