= Lefeaver =

Lefeaver is a surname. Notable people with the surname include:

- John Lefeaver (1817–1879), English cricketer
- Stephen Lefeaver (1791–1867), English cricketer
