= Dorrinton =

Dorrinton is a surname. Notable people with the surname include:

- Alban Dorrinton (1800–1872), English cricketer
- William Dorrinton (1809–1848), English cricketer, brother of Alban
