= Ommanney =

The names Ommanney and Ommaney are English, and may refer to one of the following:

== People with the surname ==
See Ommanney (surname)

== People with the given name ==
- George Willes (1823–1901), a.k.a. Admiral Sir George Ommanney Willes, a Royal Navy officer and Commander-in-Chief, Portsmouth.
- John Ommanney Hopkins (1834–1916), a.k.a. Admiral Sir John Ommanney Hopkins, a Royal Navy officer and Commander-in-Chief, Mediterranean Fleet.

== Places ==
- Mount Ommaney, Queensland, an outer suburb of Brisbane, Australia
- Ommanney Bay, an Arctic waterway in Qikiqtaaluk Region, Nunavut, Canada
- Ommanney Island a.k.a. Ostrov Ommani, a small island near Jackson Island, Franz Josef Land, Russia

== Ships ==
USS Ommaney Bay (CVE-79), a Casablanca-class escort aircraft carrier of the United States Navy
