= Stehmann =

The taxon author Stehmann may refer to:

- João Renato Stehmann (Stehmann), a botanist
- Matthias Stehmann, an ichthyologist

== See also ==
- Stermann
