= William Clifford (cricketer) =

English cricketer (1811–1841)

Personal information
- Full name: William Clifford
- Born: 1811 (Note: Carlaw gives Clifford's year of birth as 1812. CricketArchive gives the date of his christening as 11 December 1811.); Bearsted, Kent
- Died: 5 September 1841 (aged 29–30); Gravesend, Kent
- Batting: Right-handed
- Bowling: Right-arm slow
- Role: Wicket-keeper
- Relatives: Robert Clifford (grandfather); Francis Clifford (brother)

Domestic team information
- Years: Team
- 1834–1841: Kent

William Clifford (christened 14 December 1811 – 5 September 1841) was an English cricketer who played for Kent between 1834 and 1841. He was a right-handed batsman and a slow bowler who often fielded as a wicket-keeper.

Clifford was christened at Bearsted in Kent in December 1811. He was the son of Robert and Catherine Clifford; his grandfather, also Robert Clifford, was a well-known all-rounder who bowled leg breaks for Kent at the end of the 18th-century and made more than 70 appearances in top-level matches. William's brother, Francis Clifford, also played for Kent County Cricket Club during the mid-19th century.

Playing club cricket for a range of teams, including Bearsted and Leeds, William Clifford made his debut in 1834. Renowned as one of the best batsmen in Kent, he often open the batting. He played for the Players against the Gentlemen, for England (i.e., the "rest" of England), and for the South against the North. In 1841 he opened a cricket ground, Rucks Lane, at Gravesend (Note: The Bat and Ball Ground at Gravesend was established in around 1848 by Tom Adams, probably on the site of a private ground which had been created for the use of Lawrence Ruck, a Gravesend grocer who had built the nearby Ruckland House. This is likely to be the same ground.) and played his final important matches the same year.

Clifford worked as a wheelwright before becoming a publican at Gravesend in 1837. He died in September 1841 of a "bilious fever". He was probably aged less than 30.
