= Francis Clifford =

Francis Clifford may refer to:

- Francis Clifford, 4th Earl of Cumberland (1559–1641)
- Francis Clifford (cricketer) (1822–1869), English cricketer
- Francis Clifford (author) (1917–1975), the pen name of Arthur Leonard Bell Thompson, crime fiction author
