= Stearman =

Stearman is a surname. Notable people with the name include:

- Josiah Stearman (born 2003), American chess master
- Lloyd Stearman (1898–1975), American aviation pioneer
- Richard Stearman (born 1987), English footballer
- Wendi Stearman, American politician
- William Stearman (1813–1846) English cricketer
- William L. Stearman (1922–2021), American government official, aviator and author

== See also ==
- Stearman Aircraft, a company founded by Lloyd Stearman
  - Boeing-Stearman Model 75, a Stearman Aircraft biplane trainer commonly known eponymously as a Stearman
- Sterman, a surname
- Stermann, a surname
