= Usmar =

Usmar is both a given name and a surname. Notable people with the name include:

- Usmar Ismail (1921–1971), Indonesian film director
- Victor Darley-Usmar (born 1956), English biologist and biochemist
- William Usmar (1812–1879), English cricket player
