= Ommanney (surname) =

Ommanney or Ommaney is a surname, and may refer to:

- Catherine "Cat" Ommanney, a castmember of The Real Housewives of Washington, D.C.
- Charles Ommanney (fl. 2010), photojournalist for Newsweek
- Erasmus Ommanney (1814–1904), Royal Navy officer and Arctic explorer
- F. D. Ommanney (1903–1980), author of books on travel and nature including Life Nature Library's The Fishes
- Francis Ommanney (1774–1840), English politician
- George Campbell Ommanney (died 1936), vicar at St Matthew's Church, Sheffield, England
- Henry Ommaney (1805–1829), English cricketer
- Henry Mortlock Ommanney (1816–1880), discoverer, surveyor and namesake of Mortlock River, Western Australia
- John Ommanney (1773–1855), Royal Navy officer and Commander-in-Chief, Plymouth.
- Montagu Ommanney (1842–1925), British civil servant and Head of the Colonial Office
- Richard Ommanney (born March 14, 1948), English screenwriter known for sitcom
