= Charles Wenman =

English cricketer

Personal information
- Full name: Charles Wenman
- Born: 1797 (Note: Wenman was baptised on 16 April 1797.); Benenden, Kent
- Relatives: Ned Wenman (half-brother); George Wenman (cousin); John Wenman (cousin); William Wenman (nephew)

Domestic team information
- Years: Team
- 1828: Kent XI
- Only FC: 25 August 1828 Kent XI v Sussex XI
- Source: CricInfo, 15 May 2022

Charles Wenman (born 1797) was an English cricketer who played in one first-class match in 1828.

Wenman was born at Benenden in Kent in 1797, the son of John Wenman and his first wife Ann. His mother died the same year, and his father remarried; Wenman's half-brother Ned was born in 1808. The family was closely linked to Benenden Cricket Club, an important club in Kent at the time, and one that became one of the strongest in England by the 1830s, with Wenman's father playing for them, as did a number of his extended family members. Although Wenman is assumed to have played for Benenden, there are no definitive references to him having done so.

Although no other records of his cricket career survive, Wenman is known to have made a single first-class appearance, in an 1828 match played by a Kent XI at Brighton against a Sussex team. The match was organised by the Hawkhurst club and Wenman appeared alongside his half-brother Ned and his cousin George. (Note: Hawkhurst is less than 4 miles (6.4 km) from Benenden and the match included a number of players from the local area. The Hawkhurt club was also one of the strongest clubs in England during the early 19th century and often consisted primarily of Benenden players.) He scored three runs in the only innings in which it is known that he batted, although it is possible that the scorecard is incomplete.

Wenman was working as a carpenter in Brixton at the 1841 census and was married. No records of his life after this point have been found.

== Bibliography ==
- Carlaw, Derek (2020). Kent County Cricketers, A to Z: Part One (1806–1914) (PDF). Cardiff: ACS.
- Milton, Howard; Francis, Peter (2020). Kent County Cricket Grounds. Worthing: Pitch Publishing. ISBN 978-17-85316-61-6.
