= Richard Kilburne =

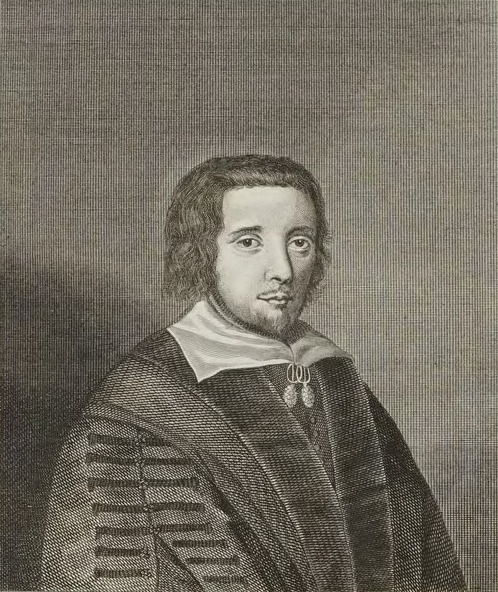
- Born: 1605
- Died: 15 November 1678 (aged 72–73)
- Occupation: Lawyer, topographer

Richard Kilburne (1605 – 15 November 1678) was an English lawyer and antiquarian. He published in 1659 A Topographie, or Survey of the County of Kent.

== Life ==
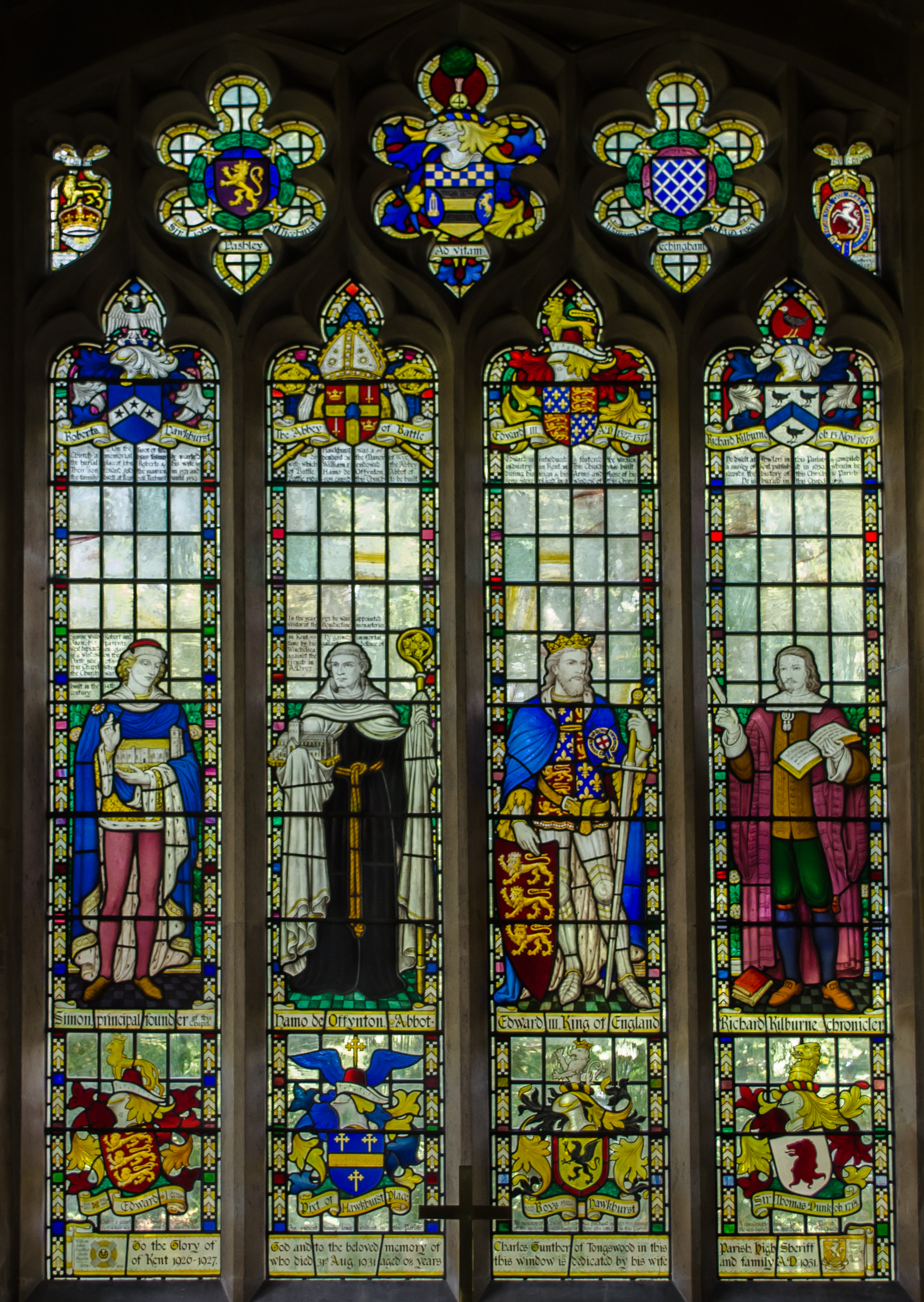
Window by H. Vernon Spreadbury (1951) in St Laurence, Hawkhurst, depicting Simon de Echingham (founder of the chapel of Whatlington), Hamo de Offynton (abbot of Battle Abbey), Edward III and Richard Kilburne.

Kilburne was born in 1605, the fifth and youngest son of Isaac Kilburne of London, and Mary, daughter of Thomas Clarke of Saffron Walden, Essex. His father's family originally came from Kilburn in Yorkshire. He was baptised on 6 October 1605 at St Mary Woolchurch Haw in London.

He entered Staple Inn, and became a chancery lawyer. By 1631 he had entered into possession of Fowlers, an estate in the parish of Hawkhurst, Kent. As a J.P. for the county he was deputed for three or four years during the Commonwealth to celebrate weddings at Hawkhurst without sacred rites, but married only two couples. In 1650 he appears as steward of the manors of Brede and Bodiam, Sussex. Edward Hasted wrote in 1798: "He was a man of some eminence in his profession as a lawyer, having been five times principal of Staples-inn, and of as worthy a character, both as a magistrate and an historian."

Kilburne died on 15 November 1678, aged 73, and was buried in the north chapel of St Laurence's Church in Hawkhurst, where there is a ledger stone to his memory, in Latin.

== Family ==
He married Elizabeth, daughter of William Davy of Beckley, Sussex, and they had six sons and three daughters. After her death he married in 1653 Sarah Birchett, a widow, daughter of James Short; she brought several children from her previous marriage.

== Publications ==
In 1657 Kilburne published as an epitome of a larger work A Brief Survey of the County of Kent, "viz. the names of the parishes in the same; in what bailiwick … and division … every of the said Parishes is …; the day on which any Market or Faire is kept therein; the ancient names of the Parish Churches, &c.". He issued in 1659 his promised larger survey entitled A Topographie, or Survey of the County of Kent, "with … historicall, and other matters touching the same, &c.". Although mainly a gazetteer, the book contains much information about Kilburne's own parish of Hawkhurst.

After his death, there was published in 1680 Choice Presidents upon all Acts of Parliament relating to the office and duty of a Justice of Peace ... "as also a more usefull method of making up Court-Rolls than hath been hitherto known or published in print," of which a third edition, "very much enlarged," was "made publick by G. F. of Gray's Inn, Esq.," in 1685. The eighth and last edition appeared in 1715.

A few of Kilburne's letters, which were preserved among the Frewen manuscripts at Brickwall House, Northiam, Sussex, were printed in Sussex Archaeological Collections (xvi. 302–4).
