= Stephen Lefeaver =

English cricketer

Personal information
- Born: 1791; Marden, Kent
- Died: 26 July 1867 (aged 75–76); Marden, Kent
- Relatives: John Lefeaver (son)

Domestic team information
- Years: Team
- 1825: Kent
- FC debut: 13 June 1825 Kent v Sussex
- Last FC: 27 June 1825 Kent v Sussex
- Source: CricketArchive, 30 March 2013

Stephen Lefeaver (1791 – 26 July 1867) was an English cricketer who played for Kent during the 1820s.

Lefeaver was born at Marden in Kent in 1791, the son of John Lefeaver and his wife Ann (née Summers). He farmed 190 acres (77 ha) at Stile Bridge on the River Beult in the same parish and played club cricket for the village team between 1817 and 1837. After 1822 he also appeared for other local cricket teams such as Benenden, Coxheath, Horsmonden and Leeds. He played two matches for Kent against Sussex in 1825, the first inter-county matches organised by the Hawkhurst club. After taking a wicket and recording a pair on debut, he made scores of eight and one in his second match.

Later in life Leafeaver ran the Stile Bridge Inn, a public house which his father had run during the 1820s and which remained in the family's hands for a number of years. He married Elizabeth Knell in 1814; the couple had seven children. One of their sons, John Lefeaver, played for Kent County Cricket Club between 1841 and 1854.

Lefeaver died at Marden in 1867.

== Bibliography ==
- Carlaw, Derek (2020). Kent County Cricketers, A to Z: Part One (1806–1914) (PDF). Cardiff: ACS.
