= Richard Wenman =

Richard Wenman may refer to:

- Richard Wenman (MP for Northampton) (1524-73), MP for Northampton (UK Parliament constituency)
- Richard Wenman, 1st Viscount Wenman (1573–1640), English landowner, MP for Oxfordshire
- Richard Wenman, 4th Viscount Wenman (1657–1690), English landowner, MP for Brackley and Oxfordshire
- Richard Wenman, 5th Viscount Wenman (1688–1729), English landowner, Viscount Wenman
- Richard Wenman (Nova Scotia politician) (c. 1712–1781), Nova Scotia merchant and politician
