= Lewis Hollingworth =

English cricketer

Lewis Hollingworth (23 February 1826 – 20 May 1876) was an English cricketer who played in three first-class cricket matches for Kent County Cricket Club in 1845 and 1846.

Hollingworth was the son of prominent paper manufacturer John Hollingworth and his wife Mary. The family paper mill operated at Turkey Mill at Boxley on the River Len in Kent, and Hollingworth was born there in 1826, one of five children. He played club cricket with one of his brothers Bearsted, Cobham and Penenden Heath as well as for West Kent. In his three first-class appearances he "made little impact", scoring only six runs in the six innings in which he batted.

Hollingworth emigrated to Australia in 1849 and married Mary Cocker, probably the sister of John Cocker who also played cricket for Kent, in 1852. The couple had two children, a son and a daughter. He suffered from health problems related to alcohol abuse and died at Adelaide in South Australia in 1876 aged 50 of kidney disease.

== Bibliography ==
- Carlaw, Derek (2020). Kent County Cricketers, A to Z: Part One (1806–1914) (PDF). Cardiff: ACS.
