= John Cocker =

English cricketer

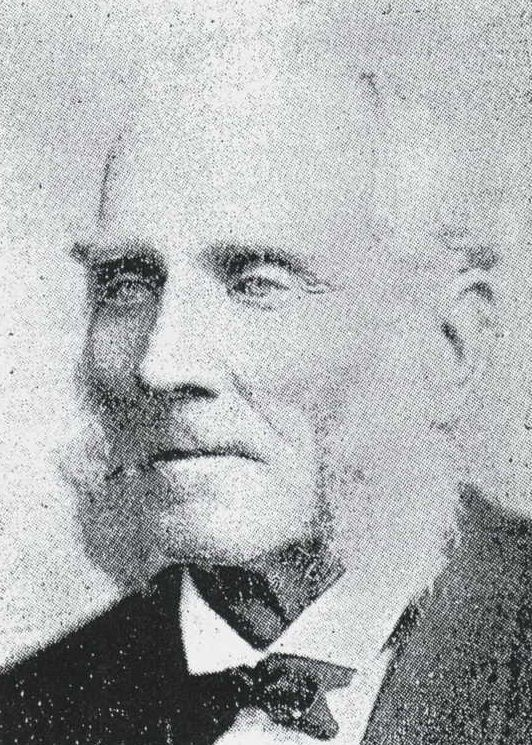
- Cocker c.1870

Personal information
- Full name: John Collard Cocker
- Born: 1815; Thurnham, Kent, England
- Died: 27 March 1885 (aged 69–70); Lower North Adelaide, South Australia

Domestic team information
- Years: Team
- 1842: Kent XI
- Only FC: 11 July 1842 Kent XI v England XI
- Source: CricInfo, 17 July 2022

John Collard Cocker (1815 – 27 March 1885), known as Joe Cocker, was an English cricketer who played a single first-class cricket match for a Kent XI in 1842. He was a key figure in the development of cricket in South Australia after emigrating to the colony in the 1840s and was the curator of the grounds that became Adelaide Oval. He was followed by the first curator of the Adelaide Oval George Gooden.

== Early life ==
Cocker was born at Thurnham near Maidstone in Kent in 1815, the son of Thomas and Mary Cocker. His father was a farmer and John played cricket such as Leeds, Bearsted and Yalding, where he played alongside players such as Alfred Mynn and William Hillyer and Ned Wenman, all of whom were key players in the great Kent teams of the day.

Cocker made his only first-class appearance for a Kent team in 1842 at Lord's just before the formation of the first Kent County Cricket Club. Although he did not play in any other first-class matches he seems to have been highly regarded as a lob bowler. He emigrated to Australia in 1846 and established a public house, the Kentish Arms, at Lower North Adelaide.

== Father of South Australian cricket ==
In South Australia Cocker became an important part of the development of cricket in the colony. He was a "central figure" of the game in Adelaide and considered by the Secretary of the Adelaide Cricket Club as the team's best player at the time. He became the curator of the grounds which became the Adelaide Oval and has been referred to as the "father of South Australian cricket". The Kentish Arms was a venue for cricket-related functions in the city.

Cocker scored what is one of the first recorded centuries in South Australia. In a single wicket challenge match against a seaman he is reported to have scored 109 runs, dismissing his opponent for less than 20 runs in return.

== Family ==
Cocker married Harriet Foster at Newington in Surrey in 1842 before emigrating. The couple had three sons and five daughters. His sister, Mary, is believed to have married fellow immigrant Lewis Hollingworth, another Kent cricketer whom Cocker played alongside in club cricket and for West Kent.

== Death ==
Cocker died at Lower North Adelaide in 1885 aged 69 survived by his three sons and five daughters and 43 grandkids.

== Bibliography ==
- Carlaw, Derek (2020). Kent County Cricketers, A to Z: Part One (1806–1914) (PDF). Cardiff: ACS.
