= William Smith (Kent cricketer) =

English cricketer

Personal information
- Full name: William Smith
- Born: c.10 February 1819; Gravesend, Kent
- Died: 6 February 1883 (aged 63); Gravesend, Kent
- Batting: Right-handed
- Role: Wicket-keeper

Domestic team information
- Years: Team
- 1840–1857: Kent
- Source: Cricinfo, 4 July 2020

William Smith (christened 10 February 1819 – 6 February 1883) was an English cricketer. He played in seven first-class cricket matches for Kent County Cricket Club between 1840 and 1857.

Smith was born at Gravesend in 1819 the son of George and Mary Smith. His father was a grocer and Smith worked in the same profession in his early life. He first played for Gravesend Cricket Club in 1839 and is thought to have been involved in the operation of the Bat and Ball Ground with Tom Adams.

Described as a "powerful hitter" in Scores and Biographies, Smith played as a wicket-keeper. He made his first-class debut for a Kent team against an England team in 1840 before the formation of the first Kent County Cricket Club in 1842. He played in 1842 and 1844 in the same fixture before emigrating to South Australia at some point during the early 1850s.

Smith is known to have played cricket in Australia and was one of the first wicket-keepers to wear pads and gloves in Australia. He worked as a government official at Port Augusta but had returned to live in Gravesend by 1856 when he played three times for Kent. His final first-class appearance came the following year.

Smith was married and in later life was a publican in Gravesend and nearby Milton. He died in 1883 aged 63 or 64.

== Bibliography ==
- Carlaw, Derek (2020). Kent County Cricketers, A to Z: Part One (1806–1914) (PDF). Cardiff: ACS.
