= Sterman =

Sterman is a surname. Notable people with the surname include:

- George Sterman (born 1946), American physicist
- John Sterman, American academic

== See also ==
- Sherman (name)
- Stearman
- Stermann
