= William Pattenden =

English cricketer (1747–1817)

William Pattenden (31 October 1747 at East Peckham, Kent – 1817 at Hadlow, buried 2 April 1817 at East Peckham) was an English professional cricketer who played for Kent. He made 7 known appearances in important matches. He was the younger brother of Thomas Pattenden.

He played alongside his brother in a number of Kent from 1777 to 1781. He may have played for Kent v Surrey in 1773 for in one account the Pattenden was William and in another it was Thomas. This is a good example of the confusion caused when initials or first names are left out of the scorecards. The same applies to various Woods, Mays, Rimmingtons, Whites, etc.
