= Robert Clifford (cricketer) =

English cricketer

Personal information
- Full name: Robert Clifford
- Born: 8 March 1752; Bearsted, Kent
- Died: 18 April 1811 (aged 59); Bearsted, Kent
- Batting: Left-handed
- Bowling: Right-arm slow
- Relatives: William Clifford (grandson); Francis Clifford (grandson)
- Source: CricInfo, 31 May 2022

Robert Clifford (8 March 1752 – 18 April 1811) was an English cricketer who played in 71 cricket matches between 1777 and 1792.

Despite having a deformed right hand caused by a childhood accident, Clifford was an effective leg break bowler who bowled right-arm slow underarm deliveries. Arthur Haygarth, writing in the mid-19th century, noted his attention to detail when bowling. He was a left-handed batsman who was recognised as an all-rounder.

Clifford mainly played for Kent (more than 30 appearances), as well as both East and West Kent, and other teams organised by Sir Horatio Mann and John Bligh, 4th Earl of Darnley, the leading Kent patrons of the day. He also played for England (i.e., the "rest" of England), Hampshire, White Conduit Club, and Marylebone Cricket Club (MCC). James Pycroft, writing in 1862, described him as one of Kent's three best players.

Clifford was born at Bearsted in Kent in 1752 and died there in 1811 aged 59. Two of his grandsons, William Clifford and Francis Clifford, also played for Kent.

== Bibliography ==
- Carlaw, Derek (2020). Kent County Cricketers, A to Z: Part One (1806–1914) (PDF). Cardiff: ACS.
- Lewis, Paul (2014). For Kent and Country. Eastbourne: Reveille Press. ISBN 978-19-08336-63-7.
