= Thomas Whitby =

English cricketer

Personal information
- Full name: Thomas Brand Whitby
- Born: 2 November 1813; Eynsford, Kent, England
- Died: 7 December 1881 (aged 68); Hackney, Middlesex, England
- Batting: Right-handed
- Bowling: Left-arm

Domestic team information
- Years: Team
- 1837: Kent

Career statistics
Competition	First-class
Matches	2
Runs scored	12
Batting average	6.00
100s/50s	0/0
Top score	11
Balls bowled	68
Wickets	0
Bowling average	–
5 wickets in innings	–
10 wickets in match	–
Best bowling	–
Catches/stumpings	2/–
- Source: Cricinfo, 30 August 2014

Thomas Brand Whitby (2 November 1813 – 7 December 1881) was an English cricketer active in the 1830s. He was born at Eynsford, Kent.

Whitby made two appearances in first-class cricket for Kent in 1837 against Sussex at Brighton, and Nottinghamshire at Town Malling. A batsman of unknown handedness, Whitby scored a total of 12 runs in his two matches, while with the ball he bowled seventeen wicket-less overs.

He died at Hackney, Middlesex on 7 December 1881.

== Bibliography ==
- Carlaw, Derek (2020). Kent County Cricketers, A to Z: Part One (1806–1914) (PDF). Cardiff: ACS.
