= Richard Mills (cricketer) =

English cricketer (1798–1882)

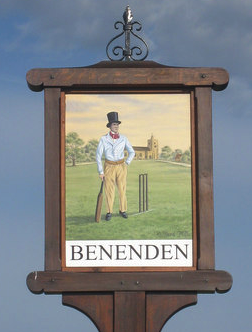
- Mills depicted on the Benenden village sign

Personal information
- Full name: Richard Mills
- Born: 18 February 1798; Benenden, Kent
- Died: 25 January 1882 (aged 83); Rolvenden, Kent
- Batting: Left-handed
- Bowling: Left-arm medium
- Relatives: George Mills (brother)

Richard Mills (16 February 1798 – 25 January 1882) was an English professional cricketer who played mainly for Kent from 1825 to 1843.

== Career ==
Mills was born at Pump Farm, Benenden in Kent in 1798. He made his debut in 1825 for Kent against Sussex at Brighton, going on to play a total a total of 47 matches. A left-handed batsman and left arm medium pace roundarm bowler, Mills played mainly for Kent, including one match for the newly formed Kent County Cricket Club in 1843 at Hemsted Park near his home in Benenden. (Note: This match was played as a benefit for Ned Wenman who Mills had famously played with in 1836.) He played six times for the Players in the Gentlemen v Players series, four times for England teams and for the South in the North v. South series.

Mills was said to be "one of the strongest professionals in the country". Benenden produced a number of fine cricketers and, in 1836, Mills played with fellow Kent and Benenden man Ned Wenman against a full team of 11 players from the Isle of Oxney on the border between Kent and Sussex. Mills and Wenman won the match which had been organised as a wager. The event is recorded on the Benenden village sign.

Mills came from a cricketing family which on at least one occasion is reported to have played as a family team against Benenden. His brother, George, played occasionally for Kent between 1825 and 1829, making his debut in the same match as Richard. George also played in the 1831 Gentlemen v Players match, possibly a match which Richard had been invited to play in but, due to the method of addressing professionals simply by their surname, the invitation is reported to have been misunderstood.

A benefit match was played for Mills in 1861 at Swifts Park in Cranbrook. He retired to Rolvenden in Kent where he died in 1882 aged 83.

== Bibliography ==
- Carlaw, Derek (2020). Kent County Cricketers, A to Z: Part One (1806–1914) (PDF). Cardiff: ACS.
