= 1842 English cricket season =

Cricket season review

The 1842 English cricket season was the 16th of the roundarm era. (Note: Any match listed in the ACS' Important Match Guide (1981) is historically important, and therefore of the highest standard, whether or not a scorecard might exist. The same applies to numerous matches discovered by researchers since 1981. For further information, see First-class cricket.) The official foundation of Kent County Cricket Club took place in Canterbury.

== Important matches ==
- 1842 match list

== Events ==
6 August. Formation of the original Kent County Cricket Club in Canterbury; it was reformed as the present club in 1859. Teams representing Kent had been playing regularly since the early 18th century but these were invariably ad hoc teams raised by wealthy patrons.

The new Kent club played its first important match against England at the White Hart Ground, Bromley on 25 to 27 August.

== Leading batsmen ==
N Felix was the leading runscorer with 406 @ 31.23

Other leading batsmen were: F Pilch, A Mynn, T Box, CG Taylor, FGB Ponsonby, B Good, T Barker, TA Anson, J Guy, C Hawkins, R Kynaston, T Sewell, JRLE Bayley

== Leading bowlers ==
WR Hillyer was the leading wicket-taker with 127

Other leading bowlers were: A Mynn, FW Lillywhite, J Dean, CG Taylor

== Bibliography ==
- ACS (1981). A Guide to Important Cricket Matches Played in the British Isles 1709–1863. Nottingham: ACS. OCLC 85045528.
- Warner, Pelham (1946). Lords: 1787–1945. London: Harrap. OCLC 877106024.
