= The Bat and Ball Ground =

Sports ground in Gravesend, Kent

- The Bat
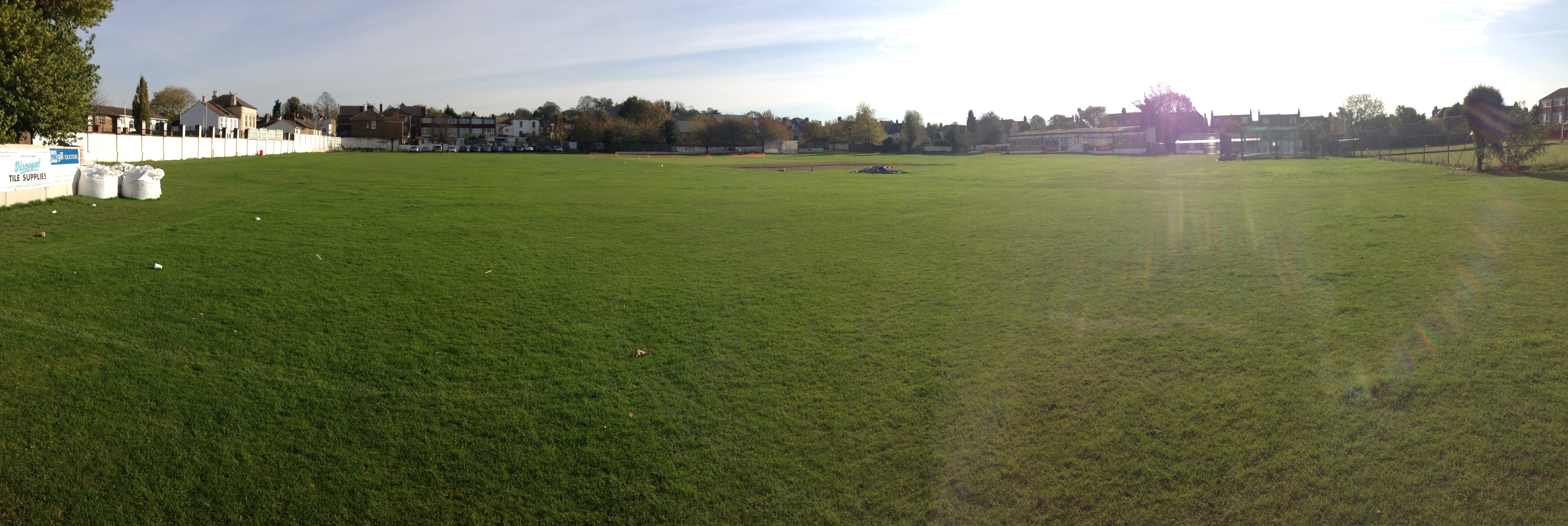
- Interactive map of The Bat and Ball Ground

Ground information
- Location: Gravesend, Kent
- Country: England
- Coordinates: 51.437°N 0.365°E
- Establishment: 1845
- Owner: Gravesend Cricket Club

Team information
| Kent County Cricket Club | (1849–1971) |
| Gravesend Cricket Club | (1881–present) |
- As of 25 November 2017; Source: CricketArchive

The Bat and Ball Ground is a cricket and sports ground in Gravesend in Kent. The ground was used as a first-class cricket venue by Kent County Cricket Club between 1849 and 1971. It remains in use by Gravesend Cricket Club who have used the ground as their home since their formation in 1881. The site also has lawn bowls and tennis facilities and is the home of Gravesend Bowls Club.

The ground is situated south of Gravesend town centre on the western team of the A227 Wrotham Road. The Bat and Ball Inn, which was named after the ground, is on the eastern team of the ground.

== Cricketing history ==
The first recorded cricket match on the site of the ground was in 1840 when a Gravesend team played Penenden Heath. It is believed by local historians that a new wicket was laid down at the ground in 1845 by Tom Adams who had played for Kent teams before and after the formation the County Club in 1842. Adams operated the ground in its early days, possibly along with another Gravesend cricketer William Smith. The cricket ground was laid out in the grounds of Ruckland House, described as a "large mansion", and used as the private cricket ground for the house. It was later owned by the Darnley family from Cobham Hall to the south of Gravesend, and by the Billings family.

Kent County Cricket Club first used the ground in 1849 for a match against an All-England Eleven in the grounds first first-class cricket match. From 1849 to 1971 the ground was the venue for 142 (Note: CricketArchive lists 143 matches played by Kent teams on the ground. Kent County Cricket Club sources detail 142 matches played by the club on the ground. Kent do not include a number of matches played by the county in the 19th century where 13 or more players were included in the Kent team as first-class matches. These are accepted as first-class matches by some other sources. An 1854 match between a Kent XV and a United England Eleven took place on the ground which is not classified as a first-class match by Kent sources.) first-class matches for Kent, the last of which saw them play the touring Pakistan team in 1971. The ground was used regularly for County Championship matches by Kent between the start of the Championship in 1890 and 1970 with one or two matches scheduled by the county at the ground in almost every season. Kent played the touring Australian team on the ground in 1893 and two matches were played by the South of England cricket team against Australian tourists in 1884 and 1886.

Non-first class matches held on the ground include one of the first matches played by the Australian Aboriginal team which toured England in 1868 – the first tour by any Australian team. The team had arrived at Gravesend and were taken to lunch at the Bat and Ball inn next to the ground. The first matches on the tours of England by the West Indies in 1933 and Indian team in 1936 were at the ground, both against teams organised by Kent great Tich Freeman, and the West Indian tourists of 1939 played against a team organised by Les Ames at the Bat and Ball Ground. In 1963 the West Indies returned again to play the Club Cricket Conference.

The ground has also played host to 24 matches involving the Kent Second XI in the Minor Counties Championship and Second XI Championship. In local cricket, the ground is the home venue of Gravesend Cricket Club who play in the Kent Cricket League.

== Records on the ground ==
A total of 145 games classified by sources as first-class cricket matches were played on the ground. All except two matches featured Kent as the home team. The South of England cricket team played two first-class matches on the ground in the 1880s.

- Highest total: 561 by Kent against Nottinghamshire, 1908
- Lowest total: 18 by Kent against Sussex, 1867
- Highest partnership: 296, 4th wicket by KL Hutchings and FE Woolley, for Kent against Northants, 1908
- Highest individual score: 257, WG Grace for Gloucestershire against Kent, 1895
- Best bowling in an innings: 8/40, AP Freeman for Kent against Leicestershire, 1935
- Best bowling in a match: 15/142, AP Freeman for Kent against Essex, 1931

== Other uses ==
The ground has been used for a number of sports and was used during the winter by Gravesend and Old Gravesendians Hockey Clubs for a number of years for field hockey matches. It has also been used for school sports, association football, rugby union and was flooded and used as an ice skating rink during the harsh winter of 1895.
