= Richard Prickett =

American fur trader

- Born: 1777; Greene County, Pennsylvania
- Died: 1847 (aged 69–70); Manitowoc County, Wisconsin
- Citizenship: U.S.A.
- Occupation: Interpreter
- Employer: Indian Service
- Partner: Wa-saw-mo-quaw
- Children: 6

Richard Prickett was an early settler of Michigan and Wisconsin. He was a fur trapper and an interpreter for the United States government during its early contacts with the Menominee tribe.

== Early life ==
It is often said that Richard Prickett was born about 1777. The 1830 Brown County, Michigan Territory federal census, however, shows him to be between the sges of 60 and 70 and it seems more likely that he was born in the late 1760. He was born in Fayette County, now Greene County, Pennsylvania. His parents were Josiah and Mary Elliott Prickett; his paternal grandfather was Abraham Prickett, a New Jersey Quaker who migrated to Maryland, then to Frederick County, Virginia, and finally to Fayette County, Pennsylvania. Richard's older brother Josiah served in the American Revolution, at times as an Indian spy. At age 13, Richard was captured by Shawnee Indians on Bear Creek, northeast of Fort Pitt, in present-day Armstrong County, Pennsylvania and later taken to Ohio by the Stockbridge tribe. After a number of years, he was given to the Chippewa tribe and Prickett moved to Michilimackinac and worked in the fur trade for 20 years. In 1804/05 Prickett was employed by the Northwest Company at the Lac La Pluie post as an interpreter with a three-year contract.

== Government interpreter ==
From 1818 to 1834, Prickett was the government interpreter for the Indian Service with the Menominee tribe. Prickett spoke the Chippewa language but did not speak the Menominee language. He was able to interpret due to the fact that most Menominee chiefs also spoke Chippewa.

In 1823, Prickett claimed a section of land on the west bank of the Fox River near Green Bay, Wisconsin. Although he himself was Roman Catholic, Prickett subscribed to and sent two of his children to the Episcopal seminary school at Green Bay. The headmaster at the school described him as "violent and abusive."

Prickett was the U.S. interpreter for Colonel Samuel C. Stambaugh, along with interpreters R.A. Forsyth, C.A. Grignon, and A.G. Ellis for the 1831 treaty with the Menominee tribe. When the Senate modified the treaty, he interpreted for the second one, in 1832. Prickett later worked for Colonel George Boyd, the U.S. Indian Agent at Green Bay, Wisconsin as an interpreter. He was said to have married a Chippewa and later a Menominee.

He also worked as a fur trapper. When he died in Manitowoc, Wisconsin, in 1847, he was said to be the wealthiest man on the reservation. His mixed-breed descendants still lived in Michigan.
