= William May (cricketer) =

English cricketer (died 1888)

Personal information
- Full name: William May
- Died: 5 August 1888; Linton, Kent
- Batting: Unknown

Domestic team information
- Years: Team
- 1834: Kent

Career statistics
Competition	First-class
Matches	1
Runs scored	6
Batting average	3.00
100s/50s	–/–
Top score	6
Balls bowled	–
Wickets	–
Bowling average	–
5 wickets in innings	–
10 wickets in match	–
Best bowling	–
Catches/stumpings	–/–
- Source: Cricinfo, 26 December 2011

William May (date of birth unknown – 5 August 1888) was an English cricketer. May's batting style is unknown. He was christened at Linton, Kent on 20 April 1808.

May made a single first-class appearance for Kent against England at the West Kent Cricket Club Ground in 1834. May was dismissed by Tom Marsden for 3 runs in Kent's first-innings total of 127. In response England made 130, while in Kent's second-innings he was dismissed for 3 runs by William Lillywhite, with Kent making just 35 runs. This left England with a target of 33, which was chased down for the loss of just one wicket. This was his only major appearance for Kent.

He died at Linton, Kent on 5 August 1888.

== Bibliography ==
- Carlaw, Derek (2020). Kent County Cricketers, A to Z: Part One (1806–1914) (PDF). Cardiff: ACS.
