= Stermann =

Stermann is a surname. Notable people with the surname include:

- Catherine Stermann (1949–1985), French actress
- Dirk Stermann (born 1965), German comedian of the duo Stermann & Grissemann

== See also ==
- Sterman
- Stearman
