= Charles Prickett =

English cricketer

Charles Prickett (1796 – 24 April 1866) was an English cricketer who made two appearances for Kent in 1826.

Prickett's matches were just a week apart, both against Sussex. In the first, despite scoring a duck in the first innings, he made his best score of 7 in the second.

In his second fixture, Kent won comfortably, with Prickett in the opening position in the order. Despite losing his opening batting partner John Noakes for a duck in the second innings, Prickett finished not out, as the team scored a nine-wicket victory.

== Bibliography ==
- Carlaw, Derek (2020). Kent County Cricketers, A to Z: Part One (1806–1914) (PDF). Cardiff: ACS.
