= Uriah Pillion =

English cricketer

Uriah Pillion (dates of birth and death unknown) was an English cricketer. Pillion's batting and bowling styles are unknown.

Pillion made a single first-class appearance for Kent in 1828 against the Marylebone Cricket Club at Lord's. In this match he was 12 not out at the end of the Kent first innings, but in their second innings he was dismissed for a duck by James Burt. He also took a single wicket in this match, but how many deliveries he bowled and how many runs were scored off of his bowling is not recorded.

== Bibliography ==
- Carlaw, Derek (2020). Kent County Cricketers, A to Z: Part One (1806–1914) (PDF). Cardiff: ACS.
