= Thomas Turney =

English cricketer

Thomas Turney (c. 1801 – 3 April 1887) was an English cricketer who played for the Kent XI. He was born and died in Westerham.

Turney made a single first-class appearance for Kent during the 1828 season, playing against a Surrey XI. From the tailend, he scored a duck in the first innings in which he batted, and 7 runs in the second. He played club cricket for Westerham, Sevenoaks Vine and the West Kent club and was a respected allrounder in club cricket. He was a carpenter and builder by trade, both at Westerham and in London.

== Bibliography ==
- Carlaw, Derek (2020). Kent County Cricketers, A to Z: Part One (1806–1914) (PDF). Cardiff: ACS.
