= William Hollis =

English cricketer

William Hollis was born 1816 in Lewisham, South London. He was an English cricketer who played seven first-class matches for Kent and the Marylebone Cricket Club in the 1840s.

== Bibliography ==
- Carlaw, Derek (2020). Kent County Cricketers, A to Z: Part One (1806–1914) (PDF). Cardiff: ACS.
