= Edward Sivewright =

English cricketer

Edward Sivewright (10 November 1806 – 1 January 1873) was an English cricketer with amateur status. He was associated with Kent, Surrey and Cambridge University and made his debut in 1828.

Sivewright was educated at Eton and Downing College, Cambridge. He was in the British Army (12th Lancers) from 1827 to 1841, rising to the rank of Captain.

== Bibliography ==
- Carlaw, Derek (2020). Kent County Cricketers, A to Z: Part One (1806–1914) (PDF). Cardiff: ACS.
- Haygarth, Arthur (1996) [1862]. Scores & Biographies, Volume 1 (1744–1826). Kennington: Frederick Lillywhite. ISBN 978-19-00592-23-9.
- Haygarth, Arthur (1997) [1862]. Scores & Biographies, Volume 2 (1827–1840). Kennington: Frederick Lillywhite. ISBN 978-19-00592-23-9.
