= Lewis Carrick =

English cricketer

Lewis Carrick (christened 27 April 1806 – 1872) was an English cricketer who played in one match for Kent.

There are some doubts about Carrick's identity, but he was probably the son of William and Celia Carrick (née Ready). (Note: The 1907 History of Kent County Cricket written by Lord Harris, Carrick is identified as Garrick.) He was christened at Dover in April 1806 and his father is believed to have been a bricklayer. Carrick played club cricket for the prestigious Updown Club, formed by landowner John Bayley who lived near Sandwich in Kent. The club recruited from the local farming community and played matches against the Marylebone Cricket Club (MCC) amongst other teams.

Carrick made a single first-class appearance for Kent during the 1828 season, playing against MCC at Lord's. In the only innings in which he batted he made a duck.

After moving to the Croydon area, Carrick worked in the brewing industry. In 1841 he married Sarah Terry at Bromley. The couple had one daughter. Carrick died at Croydon in 1872.

== Bibliography ==
- Carlaw, Derek (2020). Kent County Cricketers, A to Z: Part One (1806–1914) (PDF). Cardiff: ACS.
