= Cyril Onslow =

English cricketer

Cyril Winnington Onslow (17 December 1815 – 24 July 1866) was an English cricketer who played for Kent in 1841.

Onslow was the son of Arthur Onslow, a clergyman, and his wife Elizabeth, and was born at Newington in Surrey in 1815.

He played club cricket for Penshurst and Tunbridge Wells Cricket Clubs and for West Kent, generally as an opening batsman. In 1841 he made his only first-class cricket appearance, playing for Kent against England at Bromley. He scored four runs in the only innings Kent batted in and was not out.

Onslow worked in the police force, initially as a constable at Sheerness Dockyard, rising to the rank of superintendent at Tunbridge Wells.

He married Mary Hewlett at Barnstaple in Devon in 1848; the couple had two daughters before Mary's death in 1855. Onslow died at Tunbridge Wells in 1866 aged 50.

== Bibliography ==
- Carlaw, Derek (2020). Kent County Cricketers, A to Z: Part One (1806–1914) (PDF). Cardiff: ACS.
