= Batchelor Roper =

English cricketer

Personal information
- Full name: Batchelor Roper
- Born: 1801; Hollingbourne, Kent
- Died: 10 January 1876 (aged 74–75); Hollingbourne, Kent

Domestic team information
- Years: Team
- 1835: Kent

Career statistics
Competition	First-class
Matches	2
Runs scored	7
Batting average	1.75
100s/50s	0/0
Top score	4
Catches/stumpings	0/–
- Source: ESPNcricinfo, 30 August 2014

Batchelor Roper (1801 – 10 January 1876) was an English cricketer active who played in the 1820s and 1830s. He was born at Hollingbourne in Kent.

Roper made two appearances in first-class cricket, the first for an England XI against Sussex at Brighton in 1833 and the second appearance for Kent against England at Lord's in 1835. He is thought to have played local club cricket at Leeds, Hollingbourne and for a number of other local teams. There is some doubt whether Roper played for Kent, partly because the man who played in the 1835 Lord's match is identified in Scores and Biographies as W Roper and there is the possibility that the player involved in that match was Roper's younger brother James who played alongside him in club cricket.

The Roper brothers came from a farming family and were both farmers by profession later in life. Their parents were Batchelor and Mary Roper. Both brothers were also well-known hunters and renowned shots.

Batchelor Roper married Susannah Hudson in 1836. The couple had eight children, including an oldest son also named Batchelor. Roper died in 1876 at Hollingbourne.

== Bibliography ==
- Carlaw, Derek (2020). Kent County Cricketers, A to Z: Part One (1806–1914) (PDF). Cardiff: ACS.
