= Hawkhurst Moor =

Cricket ground in Kent, United Kingdom

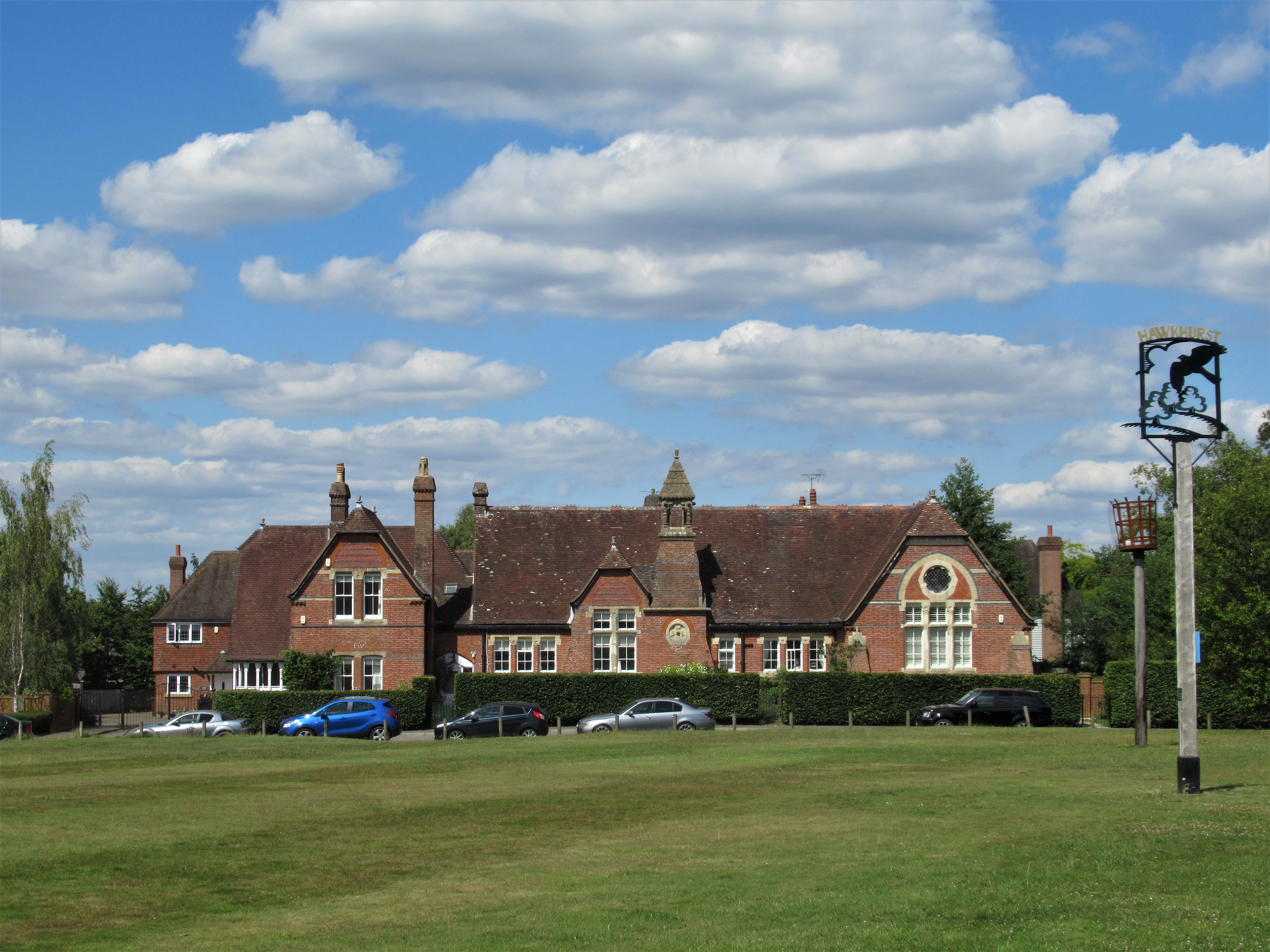
- Part of the village green with the Victorian primary school building
- Interactive map of Hawkhurst Moor

Ground information
- Location: Hawkhurst, Kent
- Country: England
- Coordinates: 51.039°N 0.504°E
- Establishment: by 1788
- Last used: 1927

Team information
Hawkhurst Cricket Club	(1788–1927)
Kent XI	(1825–1826)
- As of 6 September 2010; Source: CricketArchive

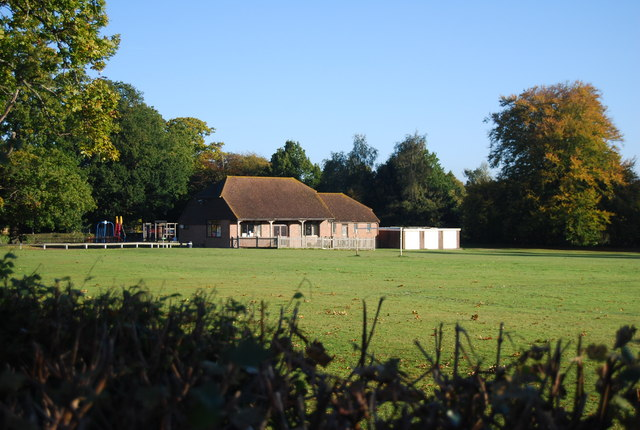
The modern sports pavilion on the King George V playing field

Hawkhurst Moor is a village green and sports field at Hawkhurst in Kent. It was the centre of the original village, and lies to the south of the modern town, with the A229 road running across the area. A cricket ground on the Moor was the venue for two important matches in the 1820s.

The Moor was originally an area of common land. The right to hold an annual fair on the green was established by a deed granted by Edward II in 1311, and a fair was held annually until the 19th century. A market was also held on the green until the 17th century and the area is used today for community events. The area is designated a conservation area, one of four in Hawkhurst. The village church, the Eight Bells public house, parish council office, a former brewery, the original Victorian village school, closed in 2003, and a former post office and stores building surround the village green area. To the east, the King George V playing field was established in 1937, and is the modern sports ground.

== Cricket ==
The cricket ground, located on the village green, was used by Hawkhurst Cricket Club in 1788. The club is known to have been active since 1727, probably playing on the Moor. The club was influential in Kent at the beginning of the 19th century, and challenged the County XI a number of times. During the 1820s, the ground was a popular venue, and two important matches were played there, one in 1825 and one in 1826.

Both matches were organised by the Hawkhurst club, and featured Kent playing against Sussex. In each year, Kent also played Sussex at the Royal New Ground in Brighton as part of the same arrangement. These were the first inter-county matches played anywhere since 1796, due to the impact of the Napoleonic Wars. During the 1830s the ground was used for at least one match by the Gentlemen of Kent amateurs against Marylebone Cricket Club.

The ground remained in use until 1927, although the buildings to the north of the green had to be shuttered during play due to the small size of the ground. The main road running to the east of the green became too busy and was widened, reducing the area usable for cricket. The cricket club moved to play on a local school playing field from 1928 to 1936, but returned to the Moor in 1937, using the newly opened King George V playing field across the main road from the original ground.

== Bibliography ==
- Carlaw, Derek (2020). Kent County Cricketers, A to Z: Part One (1806–1914) (PDF). Cardiff: ACS.
- Everleigh, N. G. (1999). Hawkhurst Conservation Areas Appraisal. Tunbridge Wells: Tunbridge Wells Borough Council. (Available online.)
- Neighbourhood Plan 2016—2033, Hawkhurst Parish Council, 2020. (Available online.)
- Milton, Howard (1979). Kent cricket grounds, in The Cricket Statistician, no. 28, December 1979, pp. 2–10. (Available online at The Association of Cricket Statisticians and Historians.)
- Milton, Howard (1992). Cricket Grounds of Kent. Nottingham: The Association of Cricket Statisticians and Historians. (Available online.)
- Milton, Howard (2020). Kent County Cricket Grounds. Woking: Pitch Publishing. ISBN 978-1-78531-661-6
