= Thomas Pattenden =

English cricketer

Thomas Pattenden (5 January 1742 at East Peckham, Kent – 10 November 1791 at East Peckham) was a noted English cricketer who played for Kent in the 1760s and 1770s. He was the elder brother of William Pattenden.

Thomas was probably the Pattenden playing for the Duke of Dorset's XI against Wrotham in 1769 when John Minshull scored the earliest-known century in cricket history, albeit in a minor match.

"Probably" is because there are often doubts about the name "Pattenden" in the old sources. Thomas played with his brother in a number of Kent from 1777 to 1781. William may have played for Kent v Surrey in 1773 for in one account the Pattenden was William and in another it was Thomas. This is a good example of the confusion caused when initials or first names are left out of the scorecards. The same applies to various Woods, Mays, Rimmingtons, Whites, etc.

Thomas Pattenden was clearly the better player of the two brothers. His highest score was 72 for Kent v Hampshire in 1775, when he so upset the odds that "more money was won and lost than ever known". He made a number of other good scores including 52 against the bowling of Lumpy Stevens and David Harris in 1783.

He is believed to have been an innkeeper in his native village of East Peckham, perhaps at the Rose & Crown adjoining the cricket ground.
