= Alban Dorrinton =

English cricketer

Personal information
- Full name: Alban Dorrinton
- Born: 24 December 1800; West Malling, Kent, England
- Died: 28 November 1872 (aged 71); West Malling, Kent, England
- Relatives: William Dorrinton (brother)

Domestic team information
- Years: Team
- 1836: Kent

Career statistics
Competition	First-class
Matches	1
Runs scored	4
Batting average	2.00
100s/50s	0/0
Top score	4
Catches/stumpings	0/–
- Source: ESPNcricinfo, 9 November 2013

Alban Dorrinton (24 December 1800 – 28 November 1872) was an English cricketer. Dorrinton batted right-handed.

Born at West Malling, Kent, he was the son of Thomas Dorrinton. Dorrington made a single appearance in first-class cricket for Kent against Sussex in 1836 at the Royal New Ground, Brighton. In a match which Sussex won by seven wickets, he was last man out when he was dismissed for a duck in Kent's first-innings, while in their second-innings he was again the last man out when he was dismissed for 4 runs when he was run out.

He died in the town of his birth on 28 November 1872. His brother William Dorrinton also played first-class cricket.

== Bibliography ==
- Carlaw, Derek (2020). Kent County Cricketers, A to Z: Part One (1806–1914) (PDF). Cardiff: ACS.
