= William Usmar =

English cricketer

William Usmar (4 October 1812 – 12 May 1879) was an English cricketer who played for Kent. He was born and died in West Malling.

Usmar made a single first-class appearance in 1841, against Sussex. As an upper-middle order batsman, he was bowled out by William Lillywhite in the first innings in which he batted, and finished not out for 0 in his second innings.

== Bibliography ==
- Carlaw, Derek (2020). Kent County Cricketers, A to Z: Part One (1806–1914) (PDF). Cardiff: ACS.
