= George Mills (cricketer, born 1793) =

English cricketer (1793–1865)

George Mills (March 1793 – August 1865) was an English professional cricketer who played from 1825 to 1831. He was mainly associated with Kent and made nine known appearances in important matches.

Mills was born at Benenden in Kent into a family of cricketers. He made his debut in 1825 against Sussex at Brighton, playing alongside his brother Richard. He made eight appearances for Kent between then and 1829. Mills' final appearance was for the Players in the Gentlemen v Players of 1831. It is reported that the invitation to play in the match was meant to be made to Richard, but that, due to the method of addressing professionals simply by their surname, was misunderstood.

Mills died at Rolvenden in Kent in 1865 aged 72.

== Bibliography ==
- Carlaw, Derek (2020). Kent County Cricketers, A to Z: Part One (1806–1914) (PDF). Cardiff: ACS.
