= Henry Ommaney =

English cricketer

Henry Ommaney (April 1805 – 21 May 1829) was an English cricketer who played for Kent. He was born in England and died in Port Royal.

Ommaney made a single first-class appearance, during the 1828 season, against Marylebone Cricket Club. Batting as an opener, he scored 20 runs in the first innings in which he batted and 24 not out in the second.

Ommaney died at the age of just 24, less than a year after the end of his first-class career.

== Bibliography ==
- Carlaw, Derek (2020). Kent County Cricketers, A to Z: Part One (1806–1914) (PDF). Cardiff: ACS.
