= William Dorrinton =

English cricketer

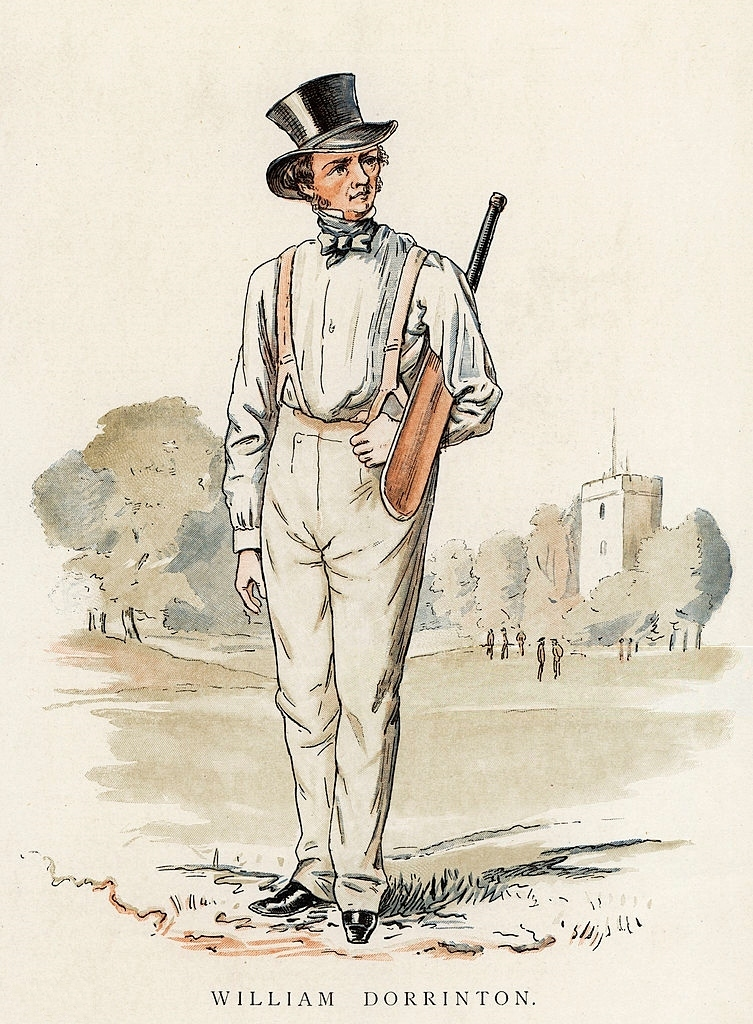

Personal information
- Full name: William Dorrinton
- Born: 29 April 1809; West Malling, Kent
- Died: 8 November 1848 (aged 39); West Malling, Kent
- Batting: Right-handed
- Role: Wicket-keeper
- Relatives: Alban Dorrinton (brother)

Domestic team information
- Years: Team
- 1836–1848: Kent County Cricket Club
- 1843–1845: Hampshire
- 1844–1846: MCC
- 1847: Suffolk
- FC debut: 8 August 1836 Kent v Sussex
- Last FC: 14 August 1848 Kent v England

Career statistics
Competition	First-class
Matches	94
Runs scored	1,440
Batting average	8.88
100s/50s	0/3
Top score	65
Balls bowled
Wickets	2
Bowling average
5 wickets in innings	0
10 wickets in match	0
Best bowling	1/?
Catches/stumpings	89/25
- Source: CricketArchive, 17 September 2008

William Dorrinton (29 April 1809 – 8 November 1848) was an English first-class cricketer who played for Kent, Hampshire, Suffolk and the Marylebone Cricket Club in a 94–match career which began in 1836 and lasted until 1847, a year before his death. While Dorrinton has two first–class wickets to his name, he became a wicket keeper part–way through his career, taking 89 catches and performing 25 stumpings.

== Early life ==
William Dorrinton was born in West Malling, Kent, in 1809, second son to father Thomas Dorrinton, who himself played two club cricket matches for Rochester against the Marylebone Cricket Club in 1800. William's brother, Alban Dorrinton, was nine years his senior and also played club cricket, and one first–class match for Kent in 1836.

William Dorrinton began his career in the 1836 cricket season with two matches for Kent, scoring 16 runs at 4.00 and a high score of only seven. In his debut match, Kent faced Sussex on 8 August. Dorrinton scored a duck and his season-best seven with the bat, playing his debut match alongside fellow debutant Tom Adams. In Dorrinton's only other match of the season, also against Sussex, he scored five and four. It was in this match that his brother Alban also debuted.

== Cricketing career ==
=== Early years ===
In 1837, Dorrinton continued to play only sporadically for Kent, appearing in four matches that season, scoring seven runs overall at an average of 1.00. In 1838 and 1839 he again played two matches each, scoring six runs at 2.00 and 11 runs at 3.66. This second season total was all accrewed in a single innings of 11 runs. In 1840 he played two more matches, scoring 27 runs across the season, at 9.00 with a high score of 22, all career bests. He also took his first wicket on in a rare bowling spell. His form continued into his first substantial season for Kent in 1841, where he played in seven matches, scoring 86 runs in the season at 8.60 with a high score of 21. In 1842 his batting continued to return career best figures with 118 runs from eight matches at 9.83, including a high score of 31.

=== Golden years ===
The period from 1843 until 1847 were Dorrintons most successful on the cricket pitch. In 1843 he played seven matches, scoring 90 runs at 7.50 with a high score of 24. It was during this season that he supplemented his career at Kent by playing for Hampshire, prior to the clubs elevation to full county status. Dorrinton began his most prolific years in 1844, where he played a total of 16 matches, scoring career bests of 310 runs at 10.00 with one half century, a score of 50 for the MCC, for which he also began playing. This was also his most successful year in the field, taking 16 catches and taking the wicket-keepers position for the first time and returning with five stumpings. He would continue to use the gloves each season for the remainder of his career.

He continued to represent both Kent, Hampshire and the MCC in 1845, playing 19 matches and bettering his previous year with the highest statistics of his career, 522 runs at 15.35, with two half centuries and a high score of 65. He continued with the gloves, taking 13 catches and completing six stumpings. He also took his second and final first–class wicket. By the end of the 1845 season, however, Dorrinton left Hampshire, and in the following season he left the MCC to play only for Kent.

=== Decline and death ===
The 1846 season saw his batting form drop, however, with a reduced 11 appearances returning only 99 runs at 4.95, with a highscore of 25. He continued to hold the gloves, taking 13 catches and completing three stumpings In 1847 Dorrinton joined Suffolk as well as continuing at Kent, and enjoyed a slight rise in form, scoring 105 runs from 10 matches, including a best score of 34*, at 6.17. He also took 12 catches and performed eight stumpings He left Suffolk at the end of 1847, to once again begin the next season playing only for Kent. The final season of his career in 1848 was, however, one of little success. In only four appearances he scored 43 runs at 7.16, at no time passing 16 runs, and took only five catches and performed three stumpings. Dorrinton retired from Kent that year. He was chosen to play one match for the All England XI late in the season on 20 September. Opening the batting, he scored three and one, took three catches and performed one stumping, however he did not return to the cricket field again, and just over a year later died in his home town in Kent.

== Bibliography ==
- Carlaw, Derek (2020). Kent County Cricketers, A to Z: Part One (1806–1914) (PDF). Cardiff: ACS.
- Norman, Philip. Scores and annals of the West Kent cricket club. With some account of the neighbourhoods of Chislehurst and Bromley and of the families residing there, Oxford University, 1897.
- Sessions, Ric. The Players: A Social History of the Professional Cricketer Pluto Press, 1988. ISBN 0-949138-20-7
- Player Profile: William Dorrinton from CricketArchive
