= Richard Wenman (Nova Scotia politician) =

Nova Scotian politician (1712–1781)

Richard Wenman (ca 1712 – September 28, 1781) was a merchant and political figure in Nova Scotia. His surname also appears as Winman. He represented Halifax Township in the Nova Scotia House of Assembly from 1765 to 1770.

He was born in England, served in the British Navy, and came to Halifax with his wife and son in 1749. In 1751, he married the widow Ann Pyke, the mother of John George Pyke. He was named a justice of the peace in 1762 and later served as a captain in the local militia. Wenman owned a brewery and was involved in real estate. He also administered the orphan house in Halifax. He died in Halifax at the age of 69.
