= William Stearman =

English cricketer

Personal information
- Born: 1813; Aldborough, Norfolk
- Died: 11 April 1846 (aged 32–33); Thurgarton, Norfolk
- Batting: Right-handed
- Role: Batsman

Domestic team information
- Years: Team
- 1836–1840: Kent XI
- 1842–1845: Norfolk XI
- FC debut: 12 September 1836 Kent XI v Sussex XI
- Last FC: 6 July 1840 Kent XI v England XI

Career statistics
| Competition | First-class |
|---|---|
| Matches | 15 |
| Runs scored | 244 |
| Batting average | 9.76 |
| 100s/50s | 0/0 |
| Top score | 26* |
| Catches/stumpings | 15/– |
- Source: CricInfo, 14 April 2024

William Stearman (1813 – 11 April 1846) was an English cricketer who played during the 1830s and 1840s. He made 15 top-class appearances, mainly for Kent, immediately before the formation of Kent County Cricket Club.

Stearman was born at Aldborough in Norfolk in 1813, the son of John and Sarah Stearman (née Muniment). Professionally he worked as a cooper and is believed to have been recruited to play for Kent by Fuller Pilch, a Norfolk player who had been persuaded to move to Town Malling in 1836.

On his debut for Kent against Sussex in 1836, Stearman scored 26 not out in his second innings, the highest score of the match. A right-handed batsman, he played in a total of 15 top-class matches, 11 for Kent and four for England (i.e., the "rest" of England), scoring a total of 244 runs and frequently opening the batting for Kent. The 26 he scored on debut remained his highest. (Note: Scores during this period were typically much lower than would be the norm today.) In 1839 he was the first man dismissed by Sam Redgate during a four-ball over in which he took three wickets. Stearman had scored 15; both Alfred Mynn and Pilch were dismissed for ducks.

By 1843 Stearman had returned to Norfolk. He played for Norfolk between 1842 and 1845 in minor matches. He died of tuberculosis in 1846 and is buried at Thurgarton, the neighbouring village to Aldborough.

== Bibliography ==
- Birley, Derek (1999). A Social History of English Cricket. London: Aurum Press. ISBN 978-18-54107-10-7 – via Internet Archive.
- Carlaw, Derek (2020). Kent County Cricketers, A to Z: Part One (1806–1914) (PDF). Cardiff: ACS.
- Lewis, Paul (2014). For Kent and Country. Eastbourne: Reveille Press. ISBN 978-19-08336-63-7.
