= William Wenman =

English cricketer

William Wenman (22 May 1832 – 23 November 1921) was an English first-class cricketer active 1862–64 who played for Kent. The son of Ned Wenman, he was born in Benenden and died in Souris, Manitoba. He played in eleven first-class matches as a right-handed batsman, scoring 179 runs with a highest score of 29 and held 6 catches.

== Bibliography ==
- Carlaw, Derek (2020). Kent County Cricketers, A to Z: Part One (1806–1914) (PDF). Cardiff: ACS.
