= Tom Adams (cricketer) =

English cricketer

Personal information
- Full name: Thomas Miles Adams
- Born: 2 May 1810; Gravesend, Kent
- Died: 20 January 1894 (aged 83); Gravesend, Kent
- Batting: Right-handed
- Bowling: Right-arm medium

Domestic team information
- Years: Team
- 1836–1858: Kent
- 1838–1856: Marylebone Cricket Club (MCC)

Thomas Miles Adams (2 May 1808 – 20 January 1894) was an English cricketer who played in the mid-19th century. He was a member of the great Kent of the 1840s and played for both Marylebone Cricket Club (MCC) and various All England Elevens. He was a right-handed batsman who bowled roundarm style.

Adams was born in Gravesend in Kent. He made his debut in the 1836 season and is known to have made over 150 appearances in important matches between 1836 and 1858. He played for Kent both before the first county club was formed in 1842 and afterwards for Kent County Cricket Club. He stood as umpire in 20 matches from 1852 to 1865.

Adams is believed to have laid down the wicket at the Bat and Ball Ground in Gravesend in 1845 and operated the ground, possibly along with another a local cricketer William Smith. This formed the basis of the ground which was used by Kent for county matches between 1849 and 1971. He died at Gravesend in 1894 aged 83.

== Bibliography ==
- Carlaw, Derek (2020). Kent County Cricketers, A to Z: Part One (1806–1914) (PDF). Cardiff: ACS.
