= John Lefeaver =

English cricketer

John Lefeaver (25 December 1817 – 20 December 1879) was an English cricketer who played for Kent County Cricket Club during the early years of the club's history.

Lefeaver was born at Stile Bridge on the River Beult in the parish of Marden in Kent. Lefeaver's family ran the Stile Bridge Inn. He played in a total of nine matches, including some during the 1841 Canterbury Cricket Week, wherein the first Kent County Cricket Club was founded, and for the county until 1854.

He died in either Stile Bridge or Upper Hardres in 1879 aged 61.

== Bibliography ==
- Carlaw, Derek (2020). Kent County Cricketers, A to Z: Part One (1806–1914) (PDF). Cardiff: ACS.
