= Hawkhurst =

Village in Kent, England

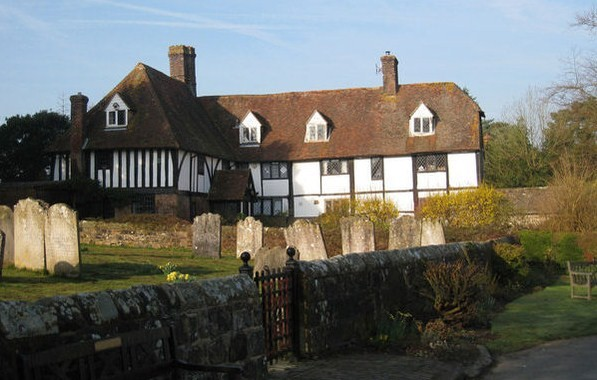
- Cottages at The Moor

- Location within Kent
- Population: 3,683
- OS grid reference: TQ765305
- District: Tunbridge Wells
- Shire county: Kent
- Region: South East
- Country: England
- Sovereign state: United Kingdom
- Post town: CRANBROOK
- Postcode district: TN18
- Dialling code: 01580
- Police: Kent
- Fire: Kent
- Ambulance: South East Coast
- UK Parliament: Tunbridge Wells

Hawkhurst is a village and civil parish in the borough of Tunbridge Wells in Kent, England. The village is located close to the border with East Sussex, around 12 miles (19 km) south-east of Royal Tunbridge Wells and within the High Weald Area of Outstanding Natural Beauty.

Hawkhurst is virtually two villages: The Moor, to the south, consists mainly of cottages clustered around a large triangular green, while Highgate, to the north, features a colonnade of independent shops, two country pubs, hotels, a digital cinema in a converted lecture hall, and Waitrose and Tesco supermarkets.

There are four designated conservation areas in Hawkhurst parish – one at Sawyers Green, two in Highgate (Highgate and All Saints' Church) and one at The Moor. There are also over 200 listed buildings across the parish.

== Toponymy ==
The name Hawkhurst is derived from Old English heafoc hyrst, meaning a wooded hill frequented by hawks – 'Hawk Wood'. Hurst (Hyrst) in a place name refers to a wood or wooded area – there are several in West Kent and East Sussex. The 11th-century Domesday Monachorum refers to the village as Hawkashyrst, belonging to Battle Abbey. In 1254, the name was recorded as Hauekehurst; in 1278, it is often shown as Haukhurst; by 1610, it had changed to Hawkherst, which then evolved into the current spelling.

== History ==
Hawkhurst has over 1,000 years of recorded history. The oldest known settlement was the Saxon manor of Congehurst, which was burnt by the Danes in 893 AD. There is still a lane of this name to the east of the village. At the time of the Domesday Book in 1086, the parish was mainly in the Lathe of Wye.

The ancient parish of Hawkhurst straddles the boundaries of four hundreds, including three that by 1295 were parts of the south of the Lathe of Scray in East Kent. The western portion of the parish of Hawkhurst was the entirety of the hundred of Great Barnfield (or East Barnfield). The eastern portion of the parish was partially in the hundred of Cranbrook and the hundred of Selbrittenden. Some acreage of the eastern portion was also in the hundred of Henhurst in the Rape of Hastings, East Sussex.

=== Iron industry ===
The village is located towards the Eastern end of the Weald, where iron has been produced from Roman times. The Weald produced over a third of all iron in Britain, and over 180 sites have been found across the Weald. Ironstone was taken from clay beds, then heated with charcoal from the abundant woods in the area. The iron was used to make everything from Roman ships to medieval cannon, and many of the Roman roads in the area were built to transport the iron. William Penn, founder of the state of Pennsylvania, is erroneously claimed to have owned ironworks at Hawkhurst. The industry eventually declined during the industrial revolution of the 18th Century, when coal became the preferred method of heating, and could not be found nearby.

=== Hop growing ===
In the 14th century, Edward III, wanting to break the Flemish (Dutch) monopoly on weaving, encouraged Flemish weavers to come to England. Many chose to settle in the Weald, because it had all the elements needed for weaving – oak to make mills, streams to drive them, and fuller's earth to treat the cloth.

The Kentish domination of the hop industry was stimulated by that same influx of Flemish weavers, who brought with them a taste for beer, and beer making skills. Several wealthy Kentish farmers invested in this new opportunity and approach. Although not the centre of the industry, Hawkhurst Brewery and Malthouse was built in 1850, on the edge of Hawkhurst Moor (now a house).

Hop growing also gave the area its distinctive skyline of hop gardens and oast houses, which were used to dry the hops. Nowadays, most hops are imported. However, at its peak 35,000 acres (140 km^{2}) of hop gardens existed in England, almost all of them in Kent, including much around Hawkhurst. Eventually mechanisation and cheap imports ended the industry, but the oast houses remain.

=== The Hawkhurst Gang ===
A witness before a 1745 Committee of Enquiry estimated there were 20,000 smugglers operating in Britain at that time. An infamous group, the "Holkhourst Genge", terrorised the surrounding area between 1735 and 1749. They were the most notorious of the Kent gangs, and were feared all along the south coast of England. At Poole in Dorset, where they had launched an armed attack on the customs house (to take back a consignment of tea that had been confiscated), several were hanged including Thomas Kingsmill, one of the gang's leaders.

A number of inns and local houses in Hawkhurst claim associations with the gang: high taxation on luxury goods in the early 18th century had led to an upsurge in smuggling, and the gang brought in brandy, silk and tobacco up from Rye and Hastings to be stowed away in hidden cellars and passages, before being sold off to the local gentry. It was reputed that when needed for a smuggling run, 500 mounted and armed men could be assembled within the hour. The Battle of Goudhurst eventually brought their career to an end.

== Transport ==
=== Roads ===
Hawkhurst lies at the intersection of the A229 and A268 roads.

=== Railway ===
A railway station was built in Hawkhurst in 1892, to the west side of the Cranbrook Road, on the northern edge of the village. It was rarely busy except during hop picking time, when up to 26 special trains per day, each carrying up to 350 Cockneys from London, would arrive at Hawkhurst – up to 10,000 people per day. As this declined, the station became uneconomic, and it was closed in 1961.

The station site is now an industrial area just off the Cranbrook Road, but some original buildings are still standing and in a good state of preservation. The nearest open station is now Etchingham.

=== Buses ===
Hawkhurst is served by the Stagecoach South East bus routes 254, 304 and 349 and provide connections to Tunbridge Wells, Wadhurst, Robertsbridge, Battle, Bodiam and Hastings. Arriva Kent and Surrey route 5 connects the village to Cranbrook, Sissinghurst, Staplehurst and Maidstone.

== Notable buildings ==
In 1886, the largest Barnardo's home for orphans under six years old was built in Hawkhurst, caring for hundreds of babies. It was known as Babies' Castle, and followed nine inspiring principles, known as "The Nine Nos":

1. No destitute child refused
2. No Race Barrier
3. No Creed Clause
4. No Physical Disability
5. No Age Limit
6. No Money Promise
7. No Voting
8. No Waiting
9. No Red Tape

Unfortunately, the building stood neglected for many years and was eventually redeveloped into a care home for the elderly, Hawkhurst House, in 2017.

In 1903 Gunther and his wife Leonie bought the Tongswood Estate. When he died in 1935, the house, dating from the 1860s, was sold and became St Ronan's School. Earlier owners of Tongswood were the Dunks family, who lived there from about 1500–1750. Sir Thomas Dunk, a wealthy clothier, who died in 1718, bequeathed enough money to build almshouses for six 'decayed housekeepers' (three men and three women) and a village school, plus enough money to buy lands to generate a steady income.

In 1875, the Victoria Lecture Hall was built by Henry Maynard "for the good of the village". It now houses Kino, a digital cinema.

=== Churches ===
The parish church of St Laurence stands at the south end of the village known as The Moor, which is the older part of Hawkhurst. It falls within the Diocese of Canterbury, and has as patron the Dean and Chapter of Christ Church, Oxford. It is likely that a church has stood on this site since 1100, or even earlier. After the Battle of Hastings William I gave the Manor of Wye, with rights over a large part of the parish, to the Abbot of Battle. The first mention of the church is in the charter of 1285, and its first rector was Richard de Clyne in 1291. The Chancel and North Chapel are the oldest parts of the church. The Great East Window was built about 1350 and has been described as one of the finest pieces of architecture in the country. Most of the rest of the church dates from around 1450, when the nave was lengthened and raised, the aisles, porches and tower added, and it took on its present appearance. The room over the North porch was used by Battle Abbey officials for rent collecting, and used to be called "The Treasury". In 1574, communion rails were introduced at a cost of 53 shillings, to keep communicants from the altar, the first parish church in England to have done so.

In 1944 a German flying bomb fell in the churchyard, causing considerable damage, and the church was put out of action until 1957. Part of the flying bomb can be seen on the south side at the back of the church.

There is a Roman Catholic church in the High Street, dedicated to St Barnabas, but, apart from Sunday, services are now held at the sister church in Goudhurst. An active Baptist Church is in Cranbrook Road, built partly on the site of the original Rootes cycle factory. A Methodist church on Highgate Hill is now being converted to a domestic dwelling: the congregation now holds services in Dunk's Almshouses.

All Saints' Church, Rye Road was a former chapel of ease for St Laurence's at Highgate. Built in 1861 by Sir George Gilbert Scott, the Church sits on the Highgate ridge with its spire visible from some distance. Grade II listed, the property is a local landmark that sat derelict for over two decades, but has now been sympathetically restored and converted into a number of private apartments.

=== Hospital ===
Hawkhurst Community Hospital (formerly the Cottage Hospital) provides 22 beds for patients who do not need to be in an acute hospital.

== Education ==
Hawkhurst is home to two schools, one local authority primary and one independent preparatory school.

- Hawkhurst Church of England Primary School
- St. Ronan's School

Hawkhurst was formerly home to Marlborough House School, prior to the school's merger with Vinehall School to become Marlborough House Vinehall School in September 2025. All operations moved to the Vinehall site near Robertsbridge, East Sussex, and the Hawkhurst site closed in July 2025.

== Notable residents ==
The 19th-century astronomer Sir John Herschel (1792–1871) lived in Hawkhurst for thirty years. It was he who named the four moons of Uranus, the planet which had been discovered by his father, Sir William Herschel. He was also a mentor and inspiration to the young Charles Darwin. Herschel lived at Collingwood House in Hawkhurst.

Richard Kilburne, born in London to a Kentish family, was a lawyer and historian. He died at Hawkhurst on 16 November 1678, at age 74. Kilburne is buried in the chancel of the church at Hawkhurst under a flat stone inscribed with Latin declaring him "an ornament and an honour to his country."

Hawkhurst was the birthplace of the Rootes car empire.

Another leading local businessman was Charles Eugene Gunther, head of the Liebig Meat Extract Company, later known as Oxo. He was also Lord Lieutenant of Kent in 1926.

Philip Langridge, the 20th-century operatic tenor, was born in Hawkhurst.

== Civil parish ==
Hawkhurst parish lies within the undulating High Weald National Landscape and is characterised by sandstone ridges, and steep-sided valleys, typically wooded and cut by gill streams. In addition to Hawkhurst village the parish includes small villages and hamlets linked by rural lanes and there are patches of ancient woodland. Streams in the north of the parish feed into the Hexden Channel, while those in the southern part drain to the Kent Ditch Water Body, both of which are tributaries of the River Rother. The geology of the area is Tunbridge Wells Sand overlying belts of Wadhurst Clay. A report for Tunbridge Wells Borough Council has mapped the borough into local Landscape Character Areas with Hawkhurst parish designated as either Wooded Farmland or Forested Plateau. The report describes Hawkhurst Wooded Farmland area as having a "peaceful, rural ambience"; sheep graze the steeper slopes, while arable farming takes place on the gentler slopes. The night sky is dark away from the village of Hawkhurst. The Bedgebury Forested Plateau is an upland landscape area, the eastern half of which falls within the parish. A medley of assart fields and woodland cover the lower slopes.

The following settlements are within the civil parish of Hawkhurst:

- Beal's Green, hamlet 51.057°N 0.511°E
- Four Throws, village
- Four Wents, hamlet
- Gill's Green, village
- Gun Green, hamlet
- High Street, village
- Little Conghurst, hamlet
- Pipsden, village
- Tubslake, hamlet
- Woodsden, hamlet

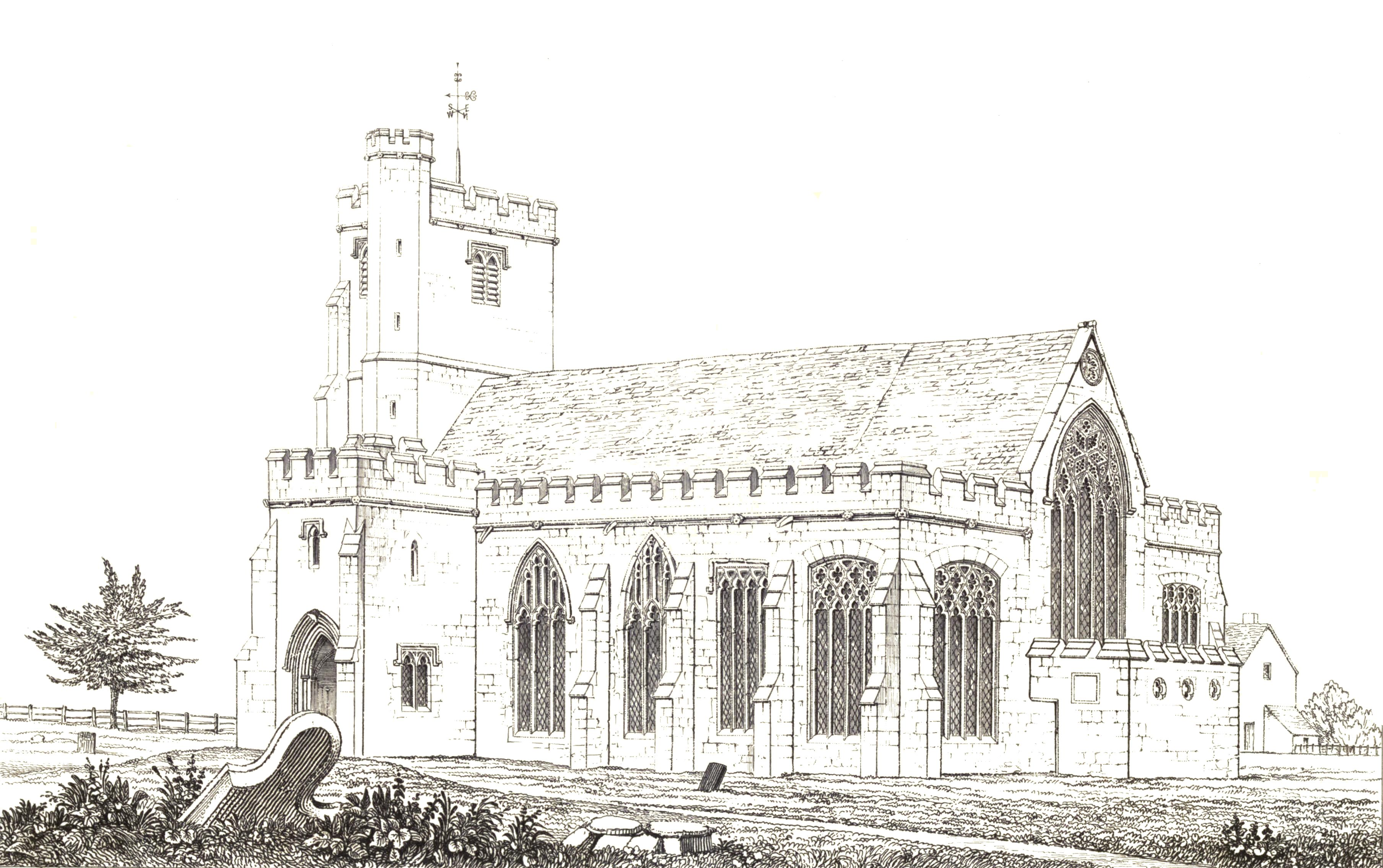
Hawkhurst Church

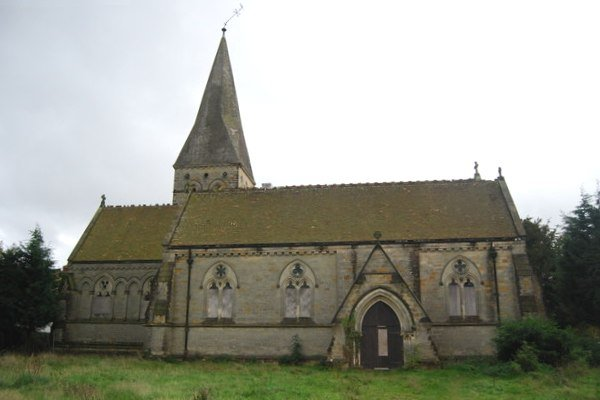
All Saints’ Church

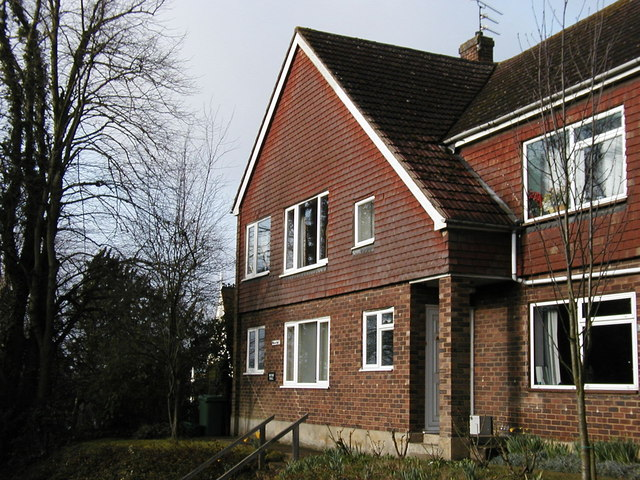
Mouse Hall and Toad Hall, Highgate

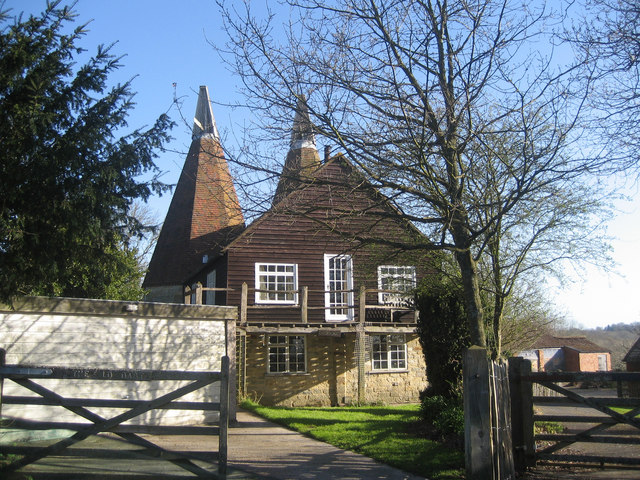
Oast
