= Gravesend Cricket Club =

Coordinates: 51°26′10″N 0°21′53″E

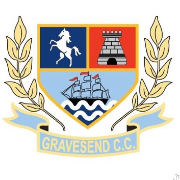
- Twenty20 name: Bat and Ball Strikers
- League: Kent Cricket League
- Association: England and Wales Cricket Board & Kent Cricket

Personnel
- Chairman: Tim Hance & Robert Lister

Team information
- City: Gravesend, Kent
- Colours: Black and Pink
- Founded: 1881
- Home ground: Bat and Ball Ground
- Secondary home ground: Nurstead Cricket Club

History
- Notable players: Gareth Breese, Ashutosh Sharma, Eldine Baptiste, Simon Hinks, Matthew Walker
- Official website: Gravesend CC Homepage

Gravesend Cricket Club is a cricket club located in Gravesend, serving the wider area of Gravesham, Kent, England. Established in 1881, the club is affiliated with Kent Cricket and the England and Wales Cricket Board (ECB). It provides opportunities for community engagement and participation in cricket through its youth and adult programmes.

== History ==
Gravesend Cricket Club was formed in 1881 through the merger of the Harkaway and Clarence Cricket Clubs. The club’s home ground, the Bat and Ball Ground, has been a cricket venue since 1848. It hosted first-class cricket for Kent County Cricket Club until 1971. Notable events at the ground include W.G. Grace's innings of 257 for Gloucestershire in 1895 and Tich Freeman's record-setting performance in 1931.

In 2015, the club became a registered charity with the objective of promoting participation in cricket and recreational activities among local residents.

The club received £43,214 from Sport England's Olympic Legacy Fund in 2011 to improve its facilities, including the installation of new outdoor nets, a roller, a bowling machine, and covers for the ground. In 2024, the club, supported by Kent Cricket's community programme, installed a borehole to reduce water usage, aligning with sustainability goals.

== Teams ==
Gravesend Cricket Club fields teams across various levels:

- Adult Teams: Compete in the Kent Cricket League, including 1st, 2nd, 3rd, 4th and 5th XI teams.
- Junior Teams: Include age groups from Under-11 to Under-17, coached by ECB-qualified staff, and participate in the ECB’s All-Stars and Dynamos Cricket programmes.
- Women’s Team: Launched in 2022, competing in the Kent Women’s Development League.
- Sunday and Midweek Teams: Play friendly fixtures throughout the season.

== Grounds ==
The club utilises two grounds for its fixtures:

- Bat and Ball Ground: The primary venue, used for league matches, junior fixtures, and Kent age-group games.

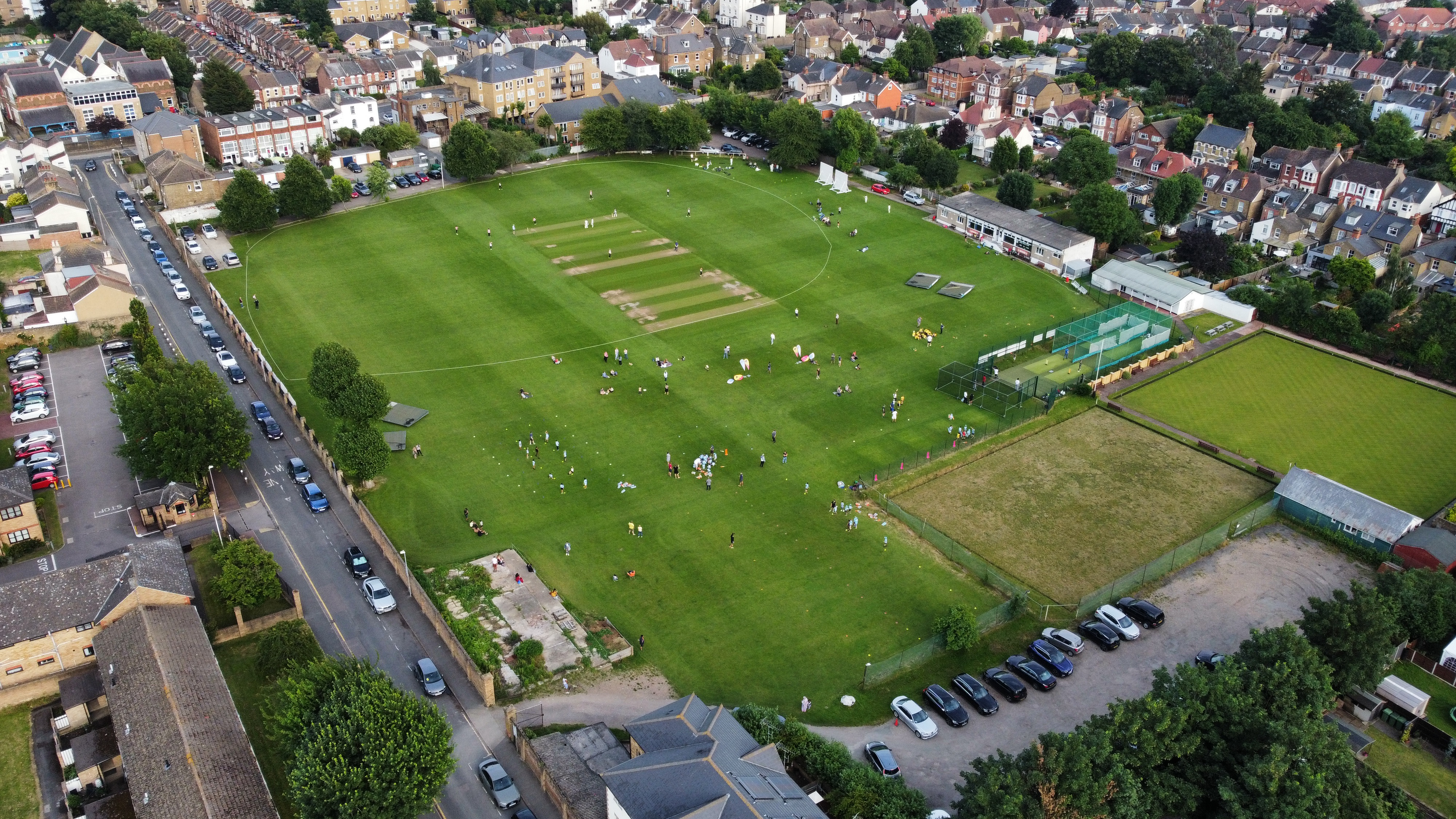
The Bat and Ball Ground, home of Gravesend Cricket Club.

- Nurstead Cricket Club: A secondary ground hosting additional league matches and friendly games. Google Maps link

== Notable players ==
Several individuals associated with Gravesend Cricket Club have gone on to achieve recognition in cricket:

- Simon Hinks – Played for Gravesend before representing Kent and Gloucestershire.
- Matthew Walker – Represented Kent and Essex, later serving as Kent's head coach.
- Eldine Baptiste – Played for Kent and Gravesend, joining as an experienced player from the West Indies.
- Gareth Breese – Played for Gravesend during his early career before becoming a first-class cricketer for Jamaica and Durham. Breese was part of Durham's 2014 Royal London One-Day Cup-winning team.
- Ashutosh Sharma – Played for Gravesend before being signed by the Indian Premier League's Punjab Kings. In 2024, he was acquired by the Delhi Capitals in the IPL auction.

== Chairpersons ==
The current chairpersons of Gravesend Cricket Club are Tim Hance and Robert Lister.
