= Ned Wenman =

English cricketer (1803–1879)

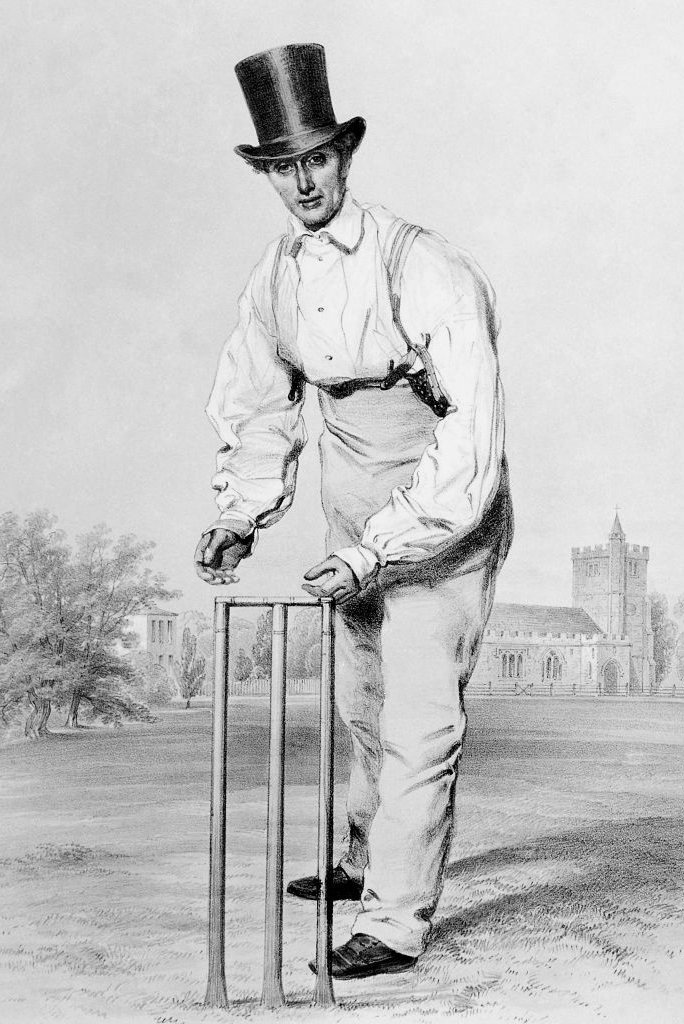
- Wenman in about 1840

Personal information
- Full name: Edward Gower Wenman
- Born: 18 August 1803; Benenden, Kent
- Died: 28 December 1879 (aged 76); Benenden, Kent
- Batting: Right-handed
- Bowling: Right-arm slow underarm
- Role: Wicket-keeper
- Relatives: William Wenman (son); Charles Wenman (half-brother); George Wenman (cousin); John Wenman (cousin)

Domestic team information
- Years: Team
- 1825–1842: Kent
- 1842–1854: Kent

Edward Gower Wenman (18 August 1803 – 28 December 1879) was an English cricketer whose career spanned the 1825 to 1854 seasons. A wicket-keeper, he was a prominent member of the great Kent elevens of the 1840s which featured Nicholas Felix, William Hillyer, Alfred Mynn and Fuller Pilch. Wenman is generally remembered as one of the best wicket-keepers of the 19th century with William Martingell describing him as the best all-round cricketer of his time.

== Early life and family ==
Born at Benenden in 1803, Wenman came from a cricketing family. His father, John, played for the village cricket team as did his cousins George and John Wenman and his half-brother Charles Wenman. All three of his sons went on to play for the village team, with one, William, going on to play cricket.

== Cricket career ==
Wenman made his cricket debut in an 1825 match between Kent and Sussex. He went on to play for Kent both before and after the formation of Kent County Cricket Club in 1842. Of the 146 important matches in which he appeared, 61 were for Kent. (Note: Wenman also played twice for a combined Kent and Sussex and three times for the Gentlemen of Kent) He played 15 times for the Players against the Gentlemen between 1830 and 1844, having also appeared as a given man for the Gentlemen in the fixture in 1829. He played for Marylebone Cricket Club (MCC)s 26 times and played 18 times for England during his career. In 1844 he retired and a benefit match was played for him at Hemsted Park near Benenden. Two years later he resumed his career, playing top-level matches until 1854.

In the 146 important matches that he is known to have played, Wenman scored 3,204 runs with a highest score of 73 not out. When not keeping wicket, Wenman was a good slow right-arm underarm bowler who took at least 45 wickets with a best performance of six in an innings. He is credited with 118 catches and 87 stumpings.

== Later life ==
Wenman worked as a carpenter and wheelwright in Benenden where he lived for the whole of his life. He married Hannah Richardson in 1830; the couple had three sons and two daughters. Wenman died at Benenden in 1879 aged 76.

== Bibliography ==
- Carlaw, Derek (2020). Kent County Cricketers, A to Z: Part One (1806–1914) (PDF). Cardiff: ACS.
