= John Wenman =

English cricketer

John Gude Wenman (11 August 1803 at Benenden, Kent – 25 November 1877 at Chobham, Surrey) was an English professional cricketer who played from 1825 to 1838. He was a cousin of Ned Wenman. He played for Kent and made nine known appearances in important matches. He represented the Players in the Gentlemen v Players series and the South in the North v. South series.

== Bibliography ==
- Carlaw, Derek (2020). Kent County Cricketers, A to Z: Part One (1806–1914) (PDF). Cardiff: ACS.
