= Sarah Lennox =

Sarah Lennox may refer to:

- Lady Sarah Lennox (1745–1826), daughter of Charles Lennox, 2nd Duke of Richmond, love of George III
- Sarah Lennox, Duchess of Richmond (1706–1751), daughter of William Cadogan, Lady of the Bedchamber to Queen Caroline
