= Caroline Fox, 1st Baroness Holland =

English baroness (1723–1774)

The Right Honourable The Lady Holland
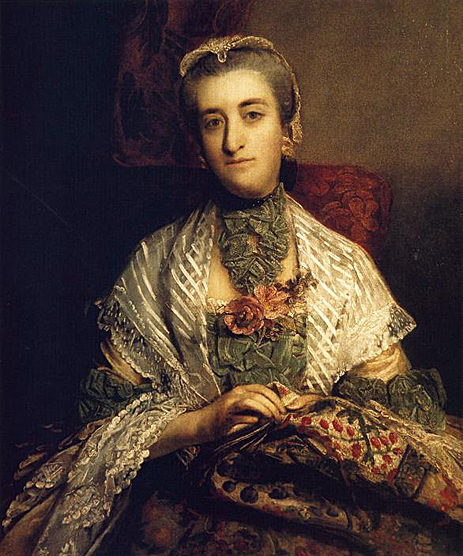
- Portrait, 1757–58
- Born: Lady Georgiana Carolina Lennox; 27 March 1723; Richmond House, London, England
- Died: 24 July 1774 (aged 51); Holland House, London, England
- Title: Baroness Holland, of Holland; Lady Holland, of Foxley
- Spouse: Henry Fox, 1st Baron Holland of Foxley (m. 1744; died 1774)
- Children: Stephen Fox, 2nd Baron Holland; Hon. Charles James Fox; Gen. Hon. Henry Edward Fox
- Parents: Charles Lennox, 2nd Duke of Richmond; Hon. Sarah Cadogan

Georgiana Carolina Fox, 1st Baroness Holland (née Lennox; 27 March 1723 – 24 July 1774) was a British aristocrat and the eldest of the Lennox sisters, who became notorious during the Georgian era for their scandalous behaviour. Her father was Charles, 2nd Duke of Richmond, a wealthy peer and grandson of King Charles II through an illegitimate line. Both her parents were also longtime courtiers. Born into wealth and influence, Caroline was raised with the expectation that her marriage would reflect and reinforce her family’s social standing.

Caroline's elopement in 1744 with Henry Fox, an ambitious Member of Parliament, caused a considerable scandal, for the marriage was made without her parents’ consent and the couple were not regarded as social equals. Nevertheless, it was a happy marriage and they had four sons, including the Whig statesman Charles James Fox and the general Henry Edward Fox. Her husband's political career advanced with Caroline's support, allowing them to accumulate a huge fortune, albeit with significant controversy. In 1762, she was created suo jure Baroness Holland, of Holland.

== Early life ==
=== Family background ===
Lady Georgiana Caroline Lennox was born on 27 March 1723 at Richmond House, London. Her parents were Charles, Earl of March (soon to be 2nd Duke of Richmond), and his wife Sarah, daughter and co-heir of William, 1st Earl Cadogan. Her paternal grandfather, Charles, 1st Duke of Richmond, was an illegitimate son of King Charles II by his longtime mistress Louise de Kérouaille. Through this connection, the 1st Duke was awarded with titles in the peerages of England, Scotland, and France. He also inherited an annuity of £2,000 and a share of coal dues that would normally have been part of the Crown's tax revenue. This coal allocation became a major source of the Lennox family's wealth, as mining and manufacturing grew during the Industrial Revolution. By the 1740s, the family was also collecting rental income of £20,000 a year. The family's royal connections increased over the years through court appointments and military promotions under King George I and King George II.

The 1st Duke spent much of his life in France, and the informality of that country left a marked influence on his children and grandchildren. Though they had an arranged marriage, the 2nd Duke and Duchess had an unusually loving relationship and produced a large family; Caroline was the eldest of twelve children, seven of whom survived to adulthood – the female members would be known as the Lennox sisters and acquire fame for their marriages to prominent men. Her next surviving sibling, Emily, was eight years younger. As Caroline was an only child for much of her early life, she was doted upon by her parents as well as her paternal grandmother, whom she visited in 1728. Her mother had many miscarriages and experienced the early deaths of numerous children, (Note: Her mother reportedly had twenty-seven pregnancies and fifteen miscarriages.) which gave Caroline a lifelong melancholic outlook and anxious fixation on illness and mortality. She was nearly thirty years older than her youngest sibling, Cecilia. Emily was her confidante and, barring several significant breaches, with whom she would remain closest in the family.

=== Childhood and education ===
Because her parents were courtiers required to accompany King George II and Queen Caroline as they travelled, Caroline had a nomadic childhood. She was supervised by a French-speaking governess and sometimes did not see her parents for days. At age nine, she performed in The Indian Emperour, or the Conquest of Mexico by the Spaniards, being the Sequel of The Indian Queen, a dramatic stage play, before the King and Queen.

Few details survive of young Caroline's education. She did not receive a formal education, but did have access to the leading intellectual writings of the day; her letters indicate that she was an avid reader with many interests. She loved reading stories with humour and emotion; French literature, such as that of Voltaire, was a big influence on all the Lennox sisters, and they could read that language nearly as well as English. Her father was also an influence. He had many intellectual interests, including in biology and medicine; he formed the first private menagerie of animals in England, and entertained prominent scientists at Goodwood House, their country estate in West Sussex.

Raised among the aristocratic circle of her parents, Caroline was considered intelligent and loved formal parties. Given their prominence in society, her parents hoped she would attract a great match; she worried this would be an arranged marriage rather than one of love.

== Elopement and marriage ==
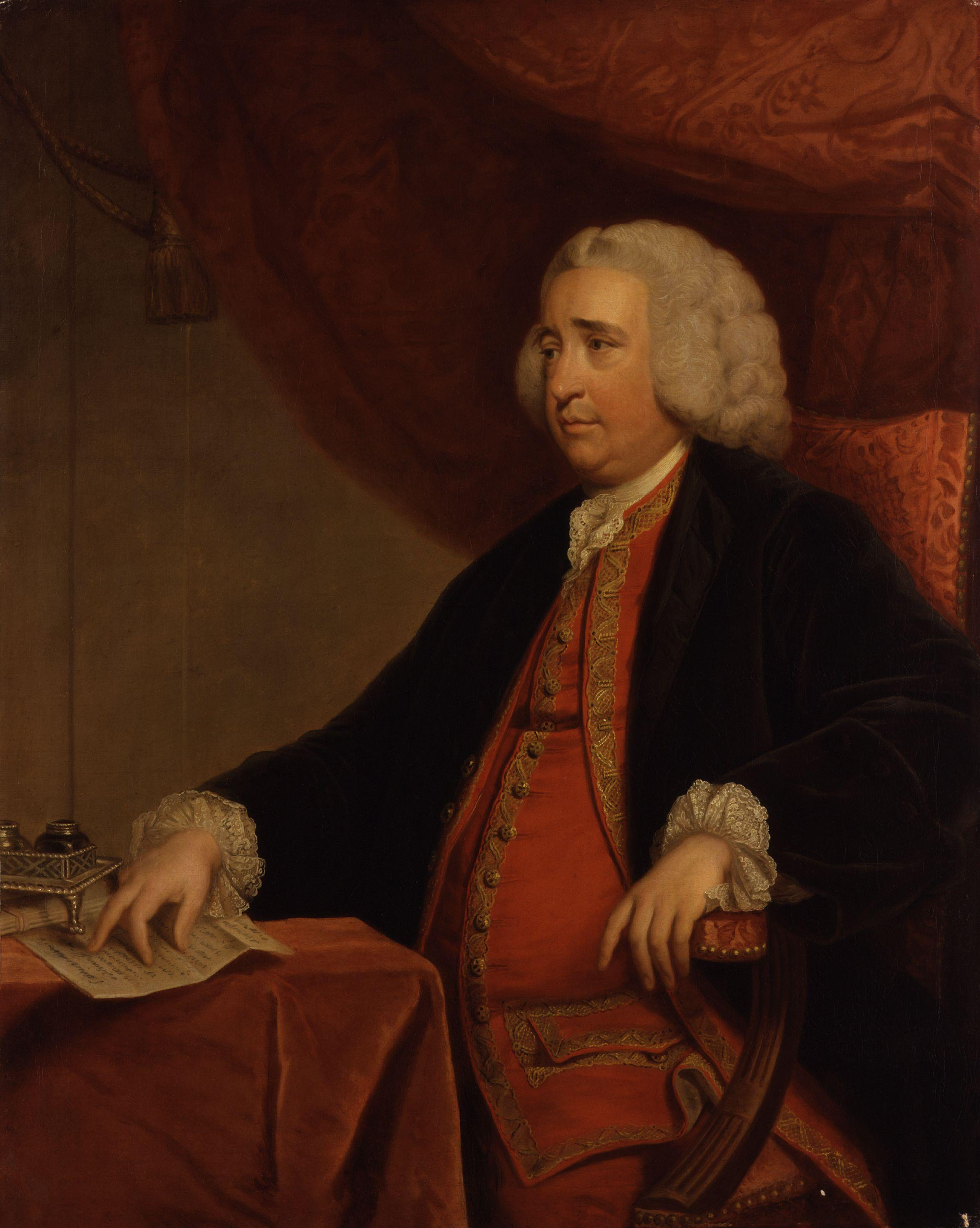
Caroline eloped with Henry Fox in 1744.

At age nineteen, Caroline fell in love with Henry Fox, a Member of Parliament who was 18 years older. Her parents viewed the connection with marked disapproval; they valued him as a friend, but disliked his Whig politics and undisguised ambition. He had a reputation as a gambler and womaniser, and was a commoner who came from a relatively low social background in sharp contrast to hers. (Note: Henry Fox's father, Sir Stephen, had risen from humble origins to be called "the richest commoner in three kingdoms" for his position as Paymaster to King Charles II.) Though he lacked physical attractions, Caroline was drawn to his intelligence, confidence, and charm; she was perhaps also enticed by the forbiddenness of the match. His brother Stephen had recently married, motivating Henry to seek companionship; her family connections were also attractive to him.

Henry Fox asked the Duke of Richmond for permission to marry Caroline, but was furiously denied. Their opposition only made Henry more adamant to pursue the match. The Duke declared his intention to depart with his family for their country estate, so knowing his time was limited, Henry forced the issue by asking Caroline to choose between him and her parents. She wrote him in a letter:

I am vastly frightened to think of what I am going to do. I dare not reflect upon it, I fear they will never forgive me. I hope you won't suspect me now of being altered but, believe me, this is the greatest proof of love it is possible for me to give you.

Her agreement led to an elopement, quietly marrying at the home of his friend Charles Hanbury Williams on 2 May 1744. Henry sent a letter to her parents informing them of the marriage; they responded with fury and effectively exiled Caroline from their home, forbidding her from seeing her siblings and not speaking to her for four years. A ball they had planned to host at Richmond House on 8 May was quickly cancelled. The historian Tim Clarke describes the elopement as "perhaps the only great sorrow of [the Duke's] full and successful life".

Polite society was outraged by the unequalness of the marriage, despite Henry Fox's prominence in government. They felt that Henry, while politically talented, had ambitions beyond his social standing that threatened the traditional class order. Attempts to restrict such clandestine, unapproved marriages had previously been raised in the House of Lords, as its aristocratic members feared their sons would become the targets of seductive fortune hunters. But these frequent calls for reform and restriction inevitably failed in the House of Commons, which was composed of men with ambitions of their own to marry into the aristocracy. As a member of the lower chamber, Henry had opposed such legislative attempts, ultimately to his benefit as it allowed him to marry well. He later also opposed the Clandestine Marriages Act of 1753 and similar legislative proposals aiming to put restrictions on marriage.

=== Children ===
A love match, the Foxes' marriage was a happy partnership of equals. She had few friends of her own, as her father forbade their family from seeing her and also threatened to alienate any acquaintances who called on his daughter. Outside of politics, Henry's time and energy was spent on his family. Between 1745 and 1755, the couple had four sons – Stephen, 2nd Baron Holland (1745–1775); Henry (1746), who died young; Charles James (1749–1806), a leading Whig politician; and Henry Edward (1755–1811), a general. The Foxes especially doted on Charles James, who was intelligent and charming. Spoilt and the favourite of his father, Caroline was the only parent who encouraged restraint in his behaviour. Her influence, however, was limited due to frequent illnesses and lengthy visits to Bath.

Caroline educated her sons at home herself, and they were all able to read and write by the age of five. She drew inspiration from the educational philosophy of Jean-Jacques Rousseau, such as encouraging exercise outdoors. However, whilst other women were starting to identify as "bluestockings", Caroline did not consider herself an intellectual. She was in favour of modern medical practices, including inoculation; the practice had become recently popular among aristocrats affiliated with the Whigs, so she accepted the risk of mortality and had her children inoculated when they were young. As her sons grew older, she believed that "school is the best place for boys," and sent them to be educated at Eton. As they aged into young adulthood, expecting they would inherit large fortunes, Stephen and Charles James frequently gambled and accumulated debts, causing her much embarrassment and distress.

== Holland House ==
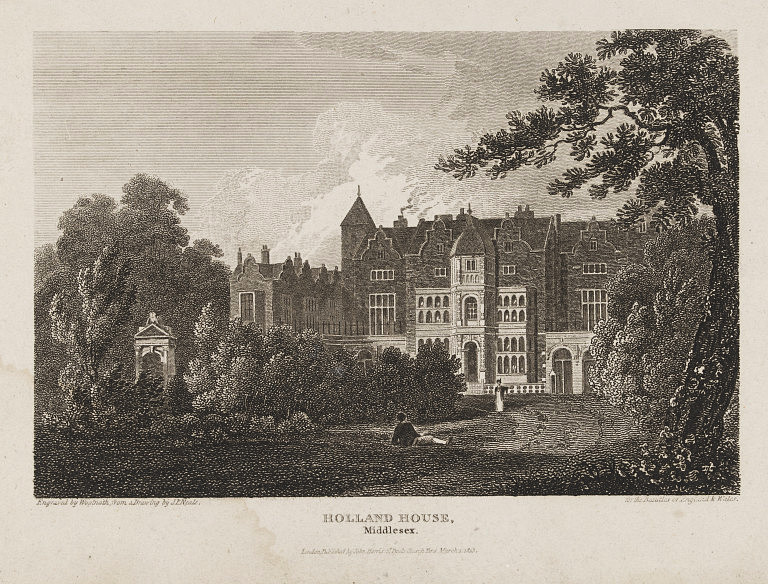
The Foxes established Holland House as their primary London residence.

In 1746, the Foxes obtained a ninety-nine year lease to Holland House, a dilapidated Jacobean country house situated over 64 acres (26 ha) on the edges of London. Intending to eventually purchase it, the Foxes made many interior improvements and bought nearby land. By the mid-1750s, the home had been completely remodelled and converted into a major social and political gathering place. They bought the residence outright in 1764, and lived there for most of the year.

Henry's political career advanced quickly. Two years into their marriage, he was appointed as Secretary at War, holding that position until 1755. He also joined the Privy Council as an adviser of the King. Holland House's proximity to Westminster meant that he could host large gatherings one day and conduct government matters the next. At first Caroline complained that this activity was a distraction from their domesticity, but eventually realised that it allowed her to see him in comparison to politicians with distant country estates.

In contrast to contemporaries who supported their husbands' careers through frequent social hosting – such as her sister Emily – Caroline did not involve herself directly in political matters, jealously feeling that it took Henry away from their domestic life. Despite the successful political careers of the men in her family, she disliked politics and only ever acted as an adviser. The historian Elaine Chalus attributes this to Caroline's irritability and social anxiety. Nonetheless, Henry recognised her ability to accurately read people and often solicited her opinion on political matters.

In addition to politics, Holland House was known for its portrait gallery. Such spaces served as family rooms and were an important way for aristocratic families to display their heritage and power. Early scholarship, drawn from account books, has credited Henry Fox with its formation and development. However, Caroline's correspondence reveals that she was the principal hand behind the forming and growing of the gallery, which she started in 1761. Intended to be a public display of the Foxes' happy marriage and Henry's successful career, it contained the couple's portraits as well as works highlighting her Lennox heritage and his political career. The collection included commissions from prominent artists like Godfrey Kneller, Joshua Reynolds, and Allan Ramsay. The Foxes used the gallery often when hosting friends and politicians, and also compiled a large library at their residence which included works by Voltaire and Rousseau.

== Lennox family scandal ==
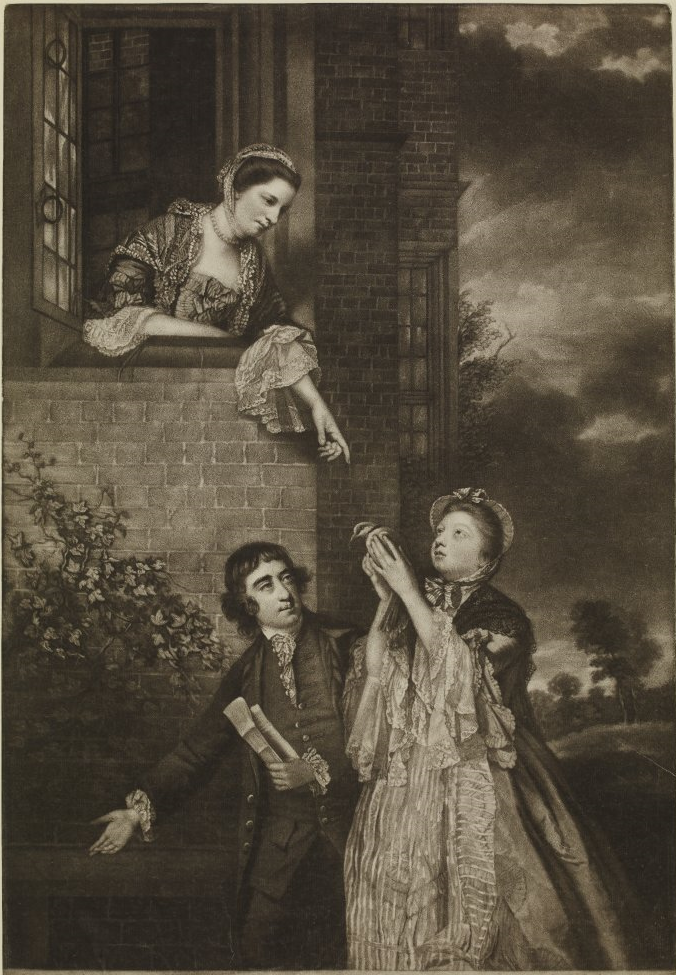
Caroline's son Charles James Fox with her sister Sarah Lennox (left) and niece Susan Fox-Strangways

Henry and Caroline's relationship with her parents was restored four years into their marriage. The birth of a grandchild helped, as did Henry's commission of three snuff boxes of Meissen porcelain containing portraits of his wife, one of which was gifted to the Duchess. The death of her father in 1750 and her mother in 1751, left three young daughters – Louisa, Sarah, and Cecilia, aged eight, six, and one. The Duke, in his will, remembered Caroline's reckless elopement and passed over her by instructing that the girls be entrusted to the care of their sister Emily and her husband, James, 20th Earl of Kildare, who lived in Ireland. As the eldest sibling, Caroline resented this slight, but hoped to redeem herself by presenting her younger sisters at court and helping them make good matches.

Caroline's opportunity came in November 1759 when, as dictated in their father's will, her fourteen-year-old sister Sarah returned to London to stay at Holland House. The pair were largely strangers after their long time apart, but within a year, their relationship was restored. (Note: Sarah also became lifelong friends with Henry Fox's niece Susan Fox-Strangways, who was staying at their home and would go on to scandalously marry an actor and endure social exile.) Sarah's presentation at court quickly drew the eye of the twenty-one year old George, Prince of Wales, who fell in love with her over a two-year period. Caroline searched for other suitable marriage candidates whilst Henry encouraged the match, hoping to earn royal favour and secure himself an earldom. Such a marriage for Sarah failed to materialise after the prince – now King George III – married a German princess in 1761. Caroline continued her efforts to find a husband for her sister, hoping to prove herself as a reliable chaperone and matchmaker. (Note: Her sister Louisa had stayed in Ireland to marry, largely due to Emily's efforts to find her a suitable husband in Thomas Conolly.)

A new candidate, Charles Bunbury, often attended Holland House and began courting Sarah. Caroline made inquiries and determined he was a suitable option, albeit not wealthy enough to support their lifestyle. Their marriage would prove to be a disaster; Sarah scandalously embarked on extramarital affairs and had a child with her lover, leading Bunbury to divorce her. The affair brought much dismay and disagreement to the Lennox family. Lord Kildare accused Caroline of "careless" oversight and declared that the Duke of Richmond's will had been quite correct in placing his young daughters in their care; he added that Holland House was immoral for young women, implying that Henry’s own independent, unconventional views were partly to blame. Caroline's subsequent, furious defense of herself and her husband embroiled the whole family and effectively ended a twenty-five-year relationship with Emily. Their quarrel was not healed until shortly before Caroline's death.

== Final years and legacy ==
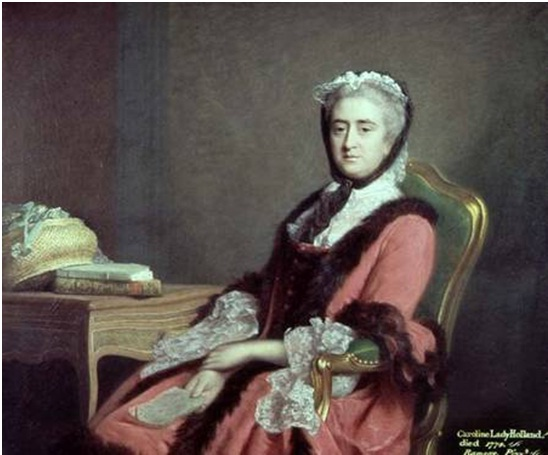
Lady Caroline, 1766

The Foxes' wealth increased upon the deaths of the Duke and Duchess of Richmond, and the obtainment of a £10,000 lottery prize. But the primary source of their growing fortune began in 1757, when Henry was appointed as Paymaster of the Forces, which while politically unimportant, allowed him to accrue great wealth. Over seven years, he reportedly accumulated a sum of £400,000. This attracted substantial criticism in newspapers and pamphlets, with Henry described as the "public defaulter of unaccounted millions," though no corruption was ever proven. Their sons' rampant, excessive gambling, which also acquired press attention, dissipated some of the family fortune despite Caroline's entreaties for them to stop.

Henry Fox had a long-standing ambition to acquire a title for his wife, hoping this would be realised due to Sarah Lennox's relationship with George III or for other services done for the Crown. A barony in the Peerage of Great Britain was the highest title he ever achieved, which allowed him to enter the House of Lords but otherwise meant the effective end of his political power. Caroline was first created Baroness Holland, of Holland on 3 May 1762. Her husband was created Baron Holland, of Foxley less than a year later, on 17 April 1763.

By the mid-1760s, Henry Fox had retired from active politics. Caroline took advantage of their newly available time to accompany him on Grand Tours to Europe three times, starting in 1766. Through both her parents, she had been raised amongst European influences and loved to travel. Details of her trips were documented through her correspondence as well as her personal notebook – in one letter to her sister Emily, Caroline wrote that she loved "vastly to see places where such and such people have been, and where great Events have hap'ned [sic] so long ago". Noting her keen eye of observation for the people and sites around her, the historians James T. Boulton and T. O. McLoughlin describe her letters as proving "invaluable to an understanding of how the wealthy aristocratic Tourists spent their time" on daily routines whilst travelling.

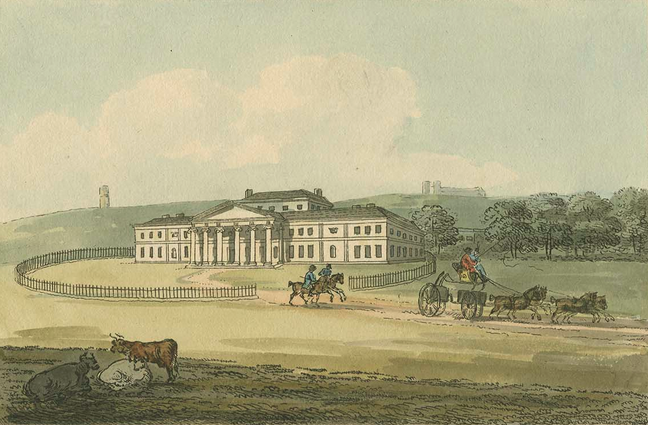
The Foxes' country retreat was at Holland House, Kingsgate.

A desire for a seaside retreat – which were becoming very popular in the Georgian era due to their perceived health benefits – led the Foxes to build a country residence at Holland House, Kingsgate in Kent, beginning in 1763. Located seventy-two miles from London, Caroline planned it as "a little quiet retreat within a day's journey of" their city residence where they could avoid being bothered by political business. A fragmented project worked on by both professional and amateur architects, it was finished in 1773, shortly before their deaths. Caroline designed portions of the residence and took inspiration from the Italian villas seen in their travels. Eventually the couple spent their summers and autumns there. The architectural historian Michael Cousins writes that "despite its aesthetic and practical shortcomings, as an early seaside villa it deserves more recognition than it has received".

=== Death ===
In October 1773, Henry Fox had a mild stroke while making arrangements to sell stock and annuities to discharge their son Stephen's substantial gambling debts. As his health slowly worsened, Caroline experienced sharp pains, nausea, and substantial weight loss, leading some of her doctors to diagnose the condition as cancer. Henry died on 1 July 1774. Twenty-three days later, his widow died in substantial pain, passing on 24 July at Holland House with her sister Louisa present. Caroline was the first of the adult Lennox siblings to die, and was buried alongside her husband at Farley, Wiltshire.

=== Legacy ===
The Lennox sisters' correspondence constitutes much of their legacy. The historian Stella Tillyard describes them as "nearly a century's worth of letters [...] written in voices that we have scarcely ever heard, from eighteenth-century women" whose "circumstances were extraordinary". Caroline typically saved the letters she received, which became part of Holland House's collection after her death. Most of her correspondence has since not survived. Her will may have mandated the destruction of some letters, but it is more likely that others exercised editorial oversight and selectively destroyed them. For example, oftentimes only correspondence deemed significant to the life of her son, Charles James, survived. During a research project about him in 1907, Lady Agatha Russell and her adviser George Trevelyan destroyed many of the Fox family letters deemed damaging to their subject's reputation. A further selection of her letters were also believed to have been destroyed sometime after the death of the 6th Earl of Ilchester, Holland House's last resident. In 1994, Tillyard published a biography of the Lennox sisters that drew upon thousands of their surviving letters. Entitled Aristocrats, it was later adapted into a six-part drama series and released in 1999; Caroline was portrayed by the actress Serena Gordon.
