= Lady Sarah Napier =

English noble (1745–1826)

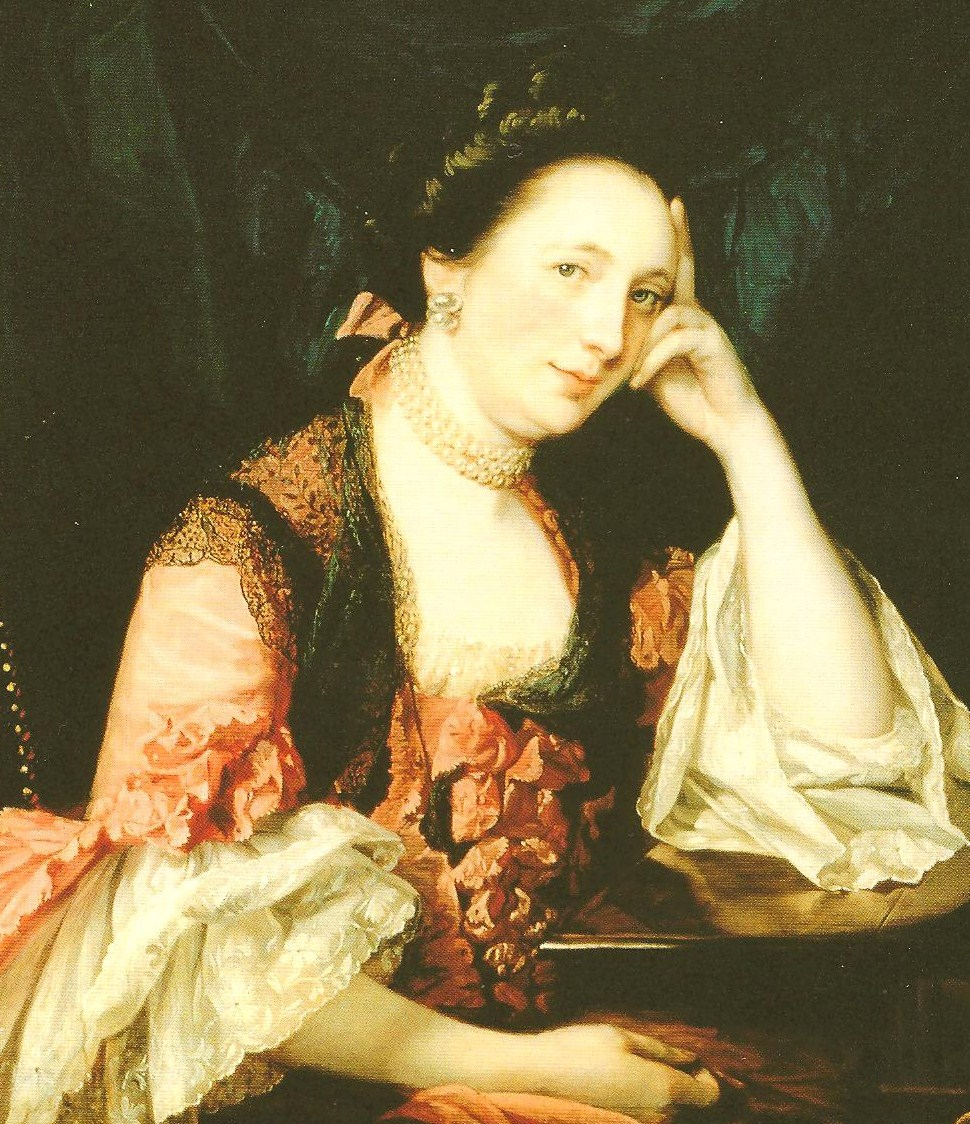
- Portrait, 1760
- Born: Lady Sarah Lennox; 14 February 1745; Richmond House, London, England
- Died: 26 August 1826 (aged 81); Cadogan Place, London, England
- Burial place: St Mary on Paddington Green Church, London, England
- Spouses: Sir Charles Bunbury, 6th Baronet (m. 1762; div. 1776) Hon. George Napier (m. 1781; died 1804)
- Children: Louisa Bunbury; Sir Charles Napier; Emily, Lady Bunbury; Sir George Thomas Napier; Sir William Napier; Richard Napier; Henry Edward Napier; Caroline Napier; Cecilia Napier
- Parents: Charles Lennox, 2nd Duke of Richmond; Hon. Sarah Cadogan

Lady Sarah Napier (née Lennox, later Bunbury; 14 February 1745 – 26 August 1826) was a British aristocrat who became notorious for her status as a royal favourite and for her scandalous extramarital affairs. One of the famous Lennox sisters, she was the frequent subject of gossip and press coverage during the middle of the Georgian era.

Her father was Charles, 2nd Duke of Richmond, a wealthy peer and grandson of King Charles II through an illegitimate line. The Duke held court appointments and frequently brought his young daughter with him to Kensington Palace, where she became a royal favourite of King George II. After her father's death, she spent her late childhood in Ireland before returning to London for her first season. The future King George III fell in love with her over a two-year period, causing Sarah to become a pawn of political factions hoping to influence him. The relationship ended upon his engagement to a German princess.

Lady Sarah's subsequent marriage in 1762 to Charles Bunbury, a Member of Parliament and horse racing enthusiast, was unhappy. Six years later, she scandalously had a child and eloped with her lover, Lord William Gordon. Bunbury successfully petitioned for divorce, a rare event for the time. Her activities attracted press attention and led to a 12-year effective exile from society. In 1781, Sarah wed George Napier in what would be a happy marriage living modestly in Ireland; they had eight children, four of whom became prominent officers in the British Army or Royal Navy.

For a long time, Sarah remained a conspicuous symbol of the feminine dissoluteness often attributed by the public to the upper classes. Her connection with George III played a part in shaping his reputation as a puritan suffering from repressed sexuality. Moreover, the Lennox sisters' surviving correspondence provide almost a century's worth of insight into the lives of aristocratic women in the Georgian era. Twentieth‑century authors drew on details from Sarah's letters when writing books about her life, including Stella Tillyard, whose biography of the sisters was adapted into a 1999 television drama series.

== Early life ==
=== Family background ===
Lady Sarah Lennox was born on 14 February 1745 at Richmond House, London. Her parents were Charles, 2nd Duke of Richmond, and his wife Sarah, daughter and co-heir of William, 1st Earl Cadogan. The younger Sarah was thus born into great wealth and influence. Her paternal grandfather, Charles, 1st Duke of Richmond, was an illegitimate son of King Charles II by his longtime mistress Louise de Kérouaille. Through this connection, the 1st Duke was awarded with titles in the peerages of England, Scotland, and France. He also inherited an annuity of £2,000 and a share of coal dues that would normally have been part of the Crown's tax revenue. This coal allocation became a major source of the Lennox family's wealth, as mining and manufacturing grew during the Industrial Revolution. The family's royal connections increased over the years through court appointments and military promotions under King George I and King George II.

The 1st Duke spent much of his life in France; the informality of that country's aristocracy, namely their casual approach to social and sexual behaviour, left a marked influence on his children and grandchildren. Though they had an arranged marriage, the 2nd Duke and Duchess had an unusually loving relationship and produced a large family; Sarah was the second youngest of twelve children, seven of whom survived to adulthood – the female members would be known as the Lennox sisters and acquire fame for their marriages to prominent men. Compared to the social rigidity typical of the British upper classes, the family was inseparable and unconstrained; Sarah was considered lively in an already energetic family. Her father had many intellectual interests, including in biology and medicine, eventually forming a small menagerie of animals and entertaining prominent scientists at Goodwood House, their country estate in West Sussex.

=== Education and coming of age ===
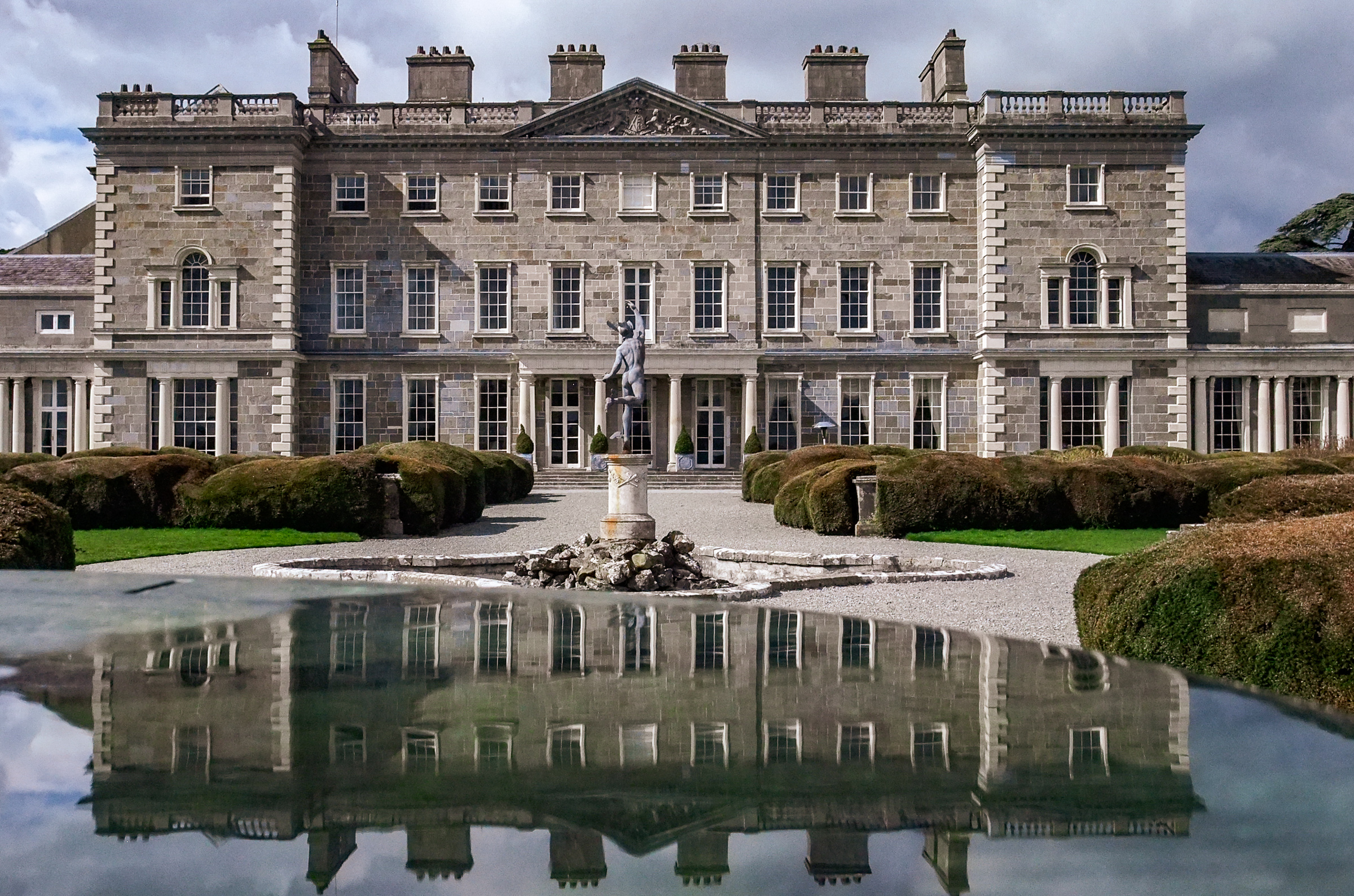
Sarah spent her late childhood years at Carton House in County Kildare, Ireland.

By the time Sarah was six years old, both of her parents were dead. The Duke's will dictated that she and her nearest siblings, Louisa and Cecilia, would be brought up by their second eldest sister Emily, Countess of Kildare, who lived at Carton House in County Kildare, Ireland. More than ten years older than her siblings, Emily acted as both a sister and second mother to them. Married to the wealthy Earl of Kildare, she already had numerous children of her own and did not mind raising a few more. Her children were of a similar age to Sarah, who acted more as their playmate than their aunt.

Sarah's letters do not include many details about her education. It is known that they were educated at home under the care of governesses. French literature was a big influence on all the Lennox sisters, and they could read that language nearly as well as English. Emily did not consider herself to be an intellectual woman, but she did seek out the latest ideas in French education for women, including those of Jean-Jacques Rousseau, Madame de Sévigné, and Jeanne-Marie Leprince de Beaumont. As a member of the Protestant Ascendancy that ruled over Ireland, Sarah would also have acquired experience socialising with her aristocratic peers.

As dictated in their father's will, Emily reluctantly sent her fourteen-year-old sister back to London for her first season in 1759. Provided with a dowry of £10,000 to find a worthy husband, Sarah stayed at Holland House, the home of her eldest sister, Lady Caroline Fox. Described by Caroline as "immensely pretty" and in possession of a "vastly engaging" manner, Sarah was also at first awkward and unsure of her attractions. She soon gained a reputation for beauty; her brother-in-law, the Whig politician Henry Fox, characterised her as "different from & prettyer than any other girl [he] ever saw ... her beauty is not easily described, otherwise by saying she had the finest complexion, most beautiful hair, with a sprightly and fine air, a pretty mouth, remarkably fine teeth & excess of bloom in her cheeks."

== Royal favourite ==
=== Childhood at court ===
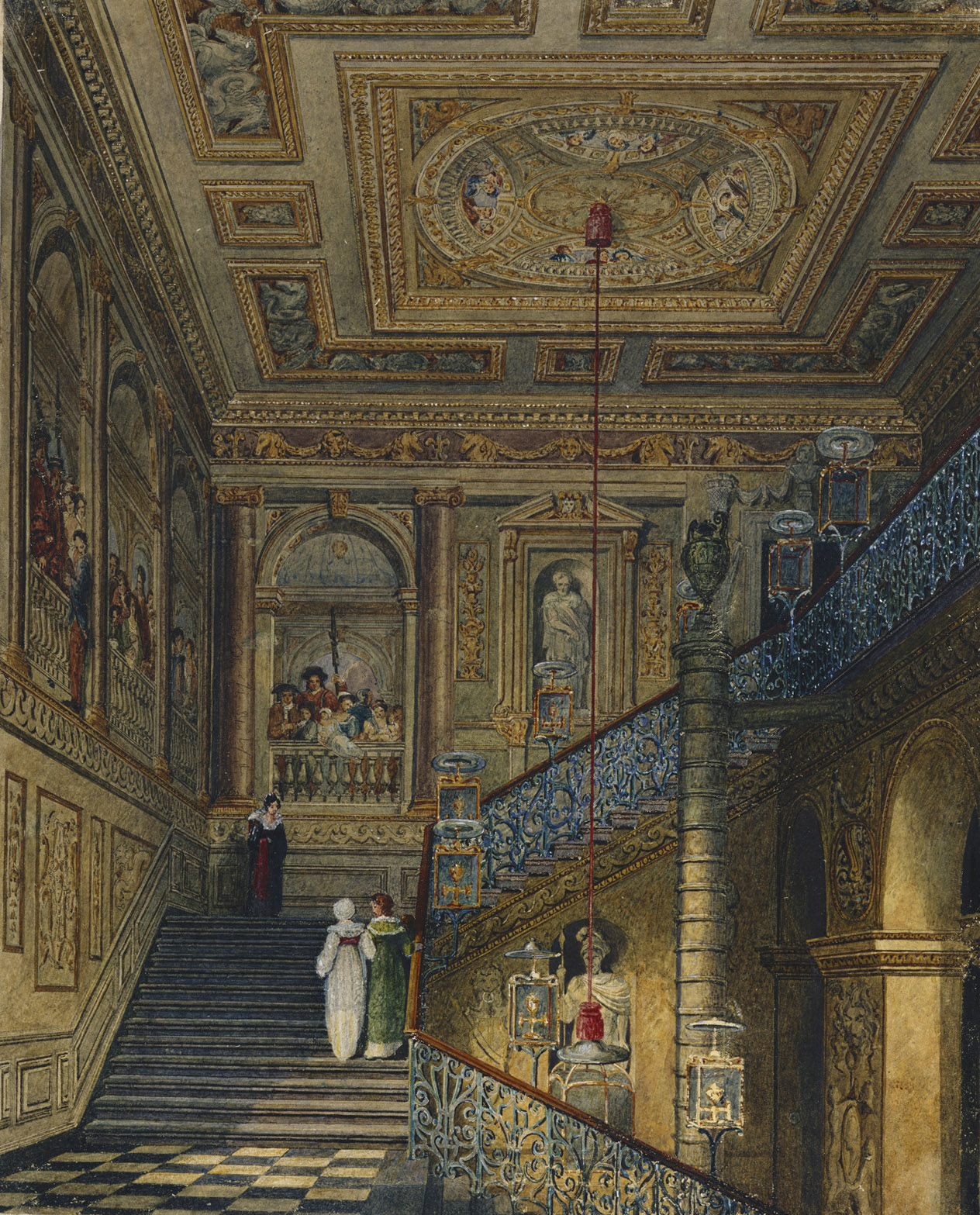
Sarah frequently visited Kensington Palace as a child and then later as an adult.

The Duke of Richmond had a long career in the service of the British Crown, and was a strong supporter of the Hanoverian Royal Family. He was proud of his young daughter's prettiness and charming manner, and often brought Sarah to court at Kensington Palace. From an early age she was a favourite of King George II, who presided over a dull court and found amusement in her energy and playfulness. During one visit in the late 1740s, the king set her in a large Chinese jar and shut the lid; instead of being fearful, to his delight she sang a rendition of the folk song Malbrough s'en va-t-en guerre. During another visit, when Sarah was still younger than five, she grew impatient to see the king and escaped her governess to surprise him with a sudden approach, declaring in French "How are you doing, Mr. King? You have a large and beautiful house here, don't you?"; (Note: Original phrase in French: Comment vous portez vous Monsieur le Roi, vous aves une grande et belle maison ici, n'est ce pas?) this impropriety was saved when she prettily curtsied.

=== Relationship with George III ===
When Sarah returned to London approximately eight years later, she was again invited to Kensington for her presentation at court. She quickly caught the eye of the king's twenty-one-year-old grandson, George, Prince of Wales. Over a two-year period, he fell in love with her, writing that "she is everything I can form to myself lovely." Sarah was flattered by the attention and fond of the shy prince, though they barely spoke during their first meeting and afterwards she spent more time in her diary describing her clothing than his appearance. After that first encounter in 1759, she continued to appear at the weekly assemblies held by the court. He gradually found the courage to ask her questions and learn more about her life and family.

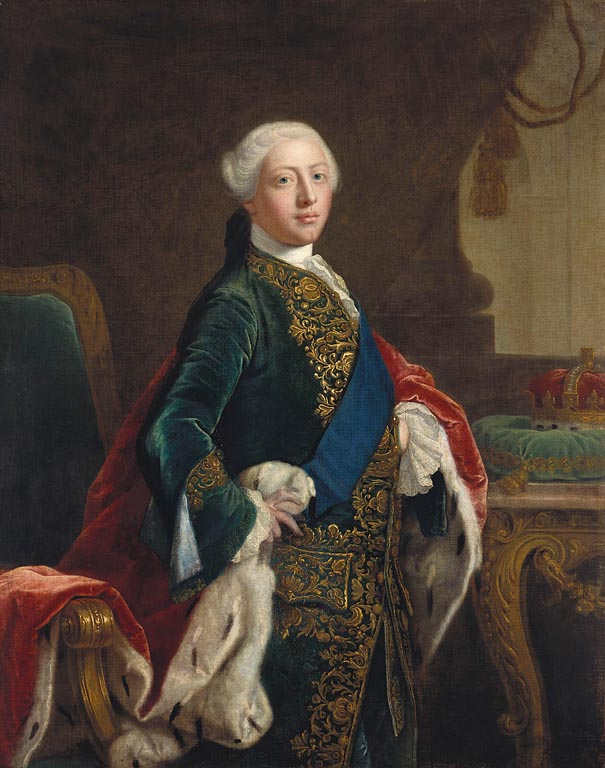
George III when Prince of Wales

The Prince of Wales kept his feelings private but eventually confided in his adviser and friend, Lord Bute, who replied that marriage with a non-royal spouse was impossible and started looking for a suitable match. Henry Fox, at first amused by the relationship, began encouraging her appearances at court – even if it did not end in marriage – as he hoped to use the connection to supplant Bute's influence with the prince or at least advance himself to an earldom. In response, part of Bute's objection to Sarah was that her elevation would bring increased power to Fox and the rest of her family at Bute's expense. Fox, in particular, was considered by many to be corrupt and unscrupulous, a dangerous connection for the Royal Family. George's mother, the Dowager Princess of Wales, also opposed the match.

In October 1760, King George II died and his grandson ascended the throne as George III. The new king was still interested, possibly hinting to her close friend Susan Fox-Strangways that he wanted an English queen and that Sarah would be a worthy candidate. However, a year after George's ascension, his engagement was announced to Charlotte of Mecklenburg-Strelitz, a German princess considered plain but also unlikely to interfere in politics. George had finally, albeit reluctantly, recognised his duty, writing in his diary that Lord Bute:

Has thoroughly convinced me of the impossibility of ever marrying a countrywoman ... The interest of my country shall ever be my first care, my own inclinations shall ever submit to it; I am born for the happiness or misery of a great nation, and consequently must often act contrary to my passions.

Sarah was surprised and embarrassed to learn of his betrothal, feeling that she had been deceived and upset that she "look[ed] like a fool." She was not, apparently, too struck by disappointment; Fox observed that she seemed sadder over the death of her pet squirrel, and Sarah also noted in a letter that she had only liked the king, not loved him. Fox encouraged her to participate in the wedding as one of the ten bridesmaids carrying Charlotte's train, so the king would "behold your pretty face and repent." She did by serving as chief bridesmaid. In later life, Sarah expressed relief that she had not become queen. The historian John Brooke describes the relationship as an infatuation in which neither would have been happy. The king's piousness and sense of virtue precluded him from taking Sarah as a mistress; he told Lord Bute, "before God that I have never had any improper thought with regard to her."

== Marriage to Charles Bunbury ==
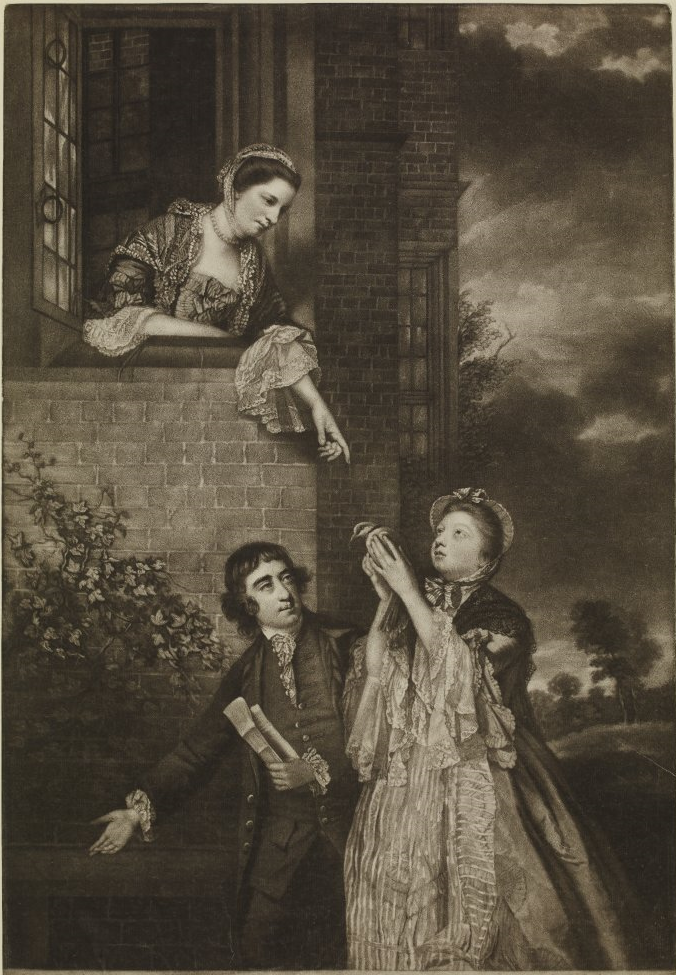
Sarah (left) with her close friend Susan Fox-Strangways and nephew Charles James Fox

Throughout Lady Sarah's association with the king and in its aftermath, her sister Caroline searched for a suitable marriage candidate. After the royal nuptials failed, Sarah's self-confidence was low and she worried about finding a good match as her three elder sisters had. By the end of the London season in 1761, the most suitable options – such as the Duke of Marlborough – had moved on to others or been ruled out by her. A brief, secret engagement with Lord Newbattle did not move forward. By the end of that year, another prospect named Charles Bunbury emerged and began courting her.

Bunbury was a 22-year-old Member of Parliament for Suffolk and often attended political discussions at Holland House. He had not had a successful legislative career, but was considered handsome and witty – Sarah described him as a "Marquis in a French story book." Caroline made inquiries and found that he was the eldest son of a baronet and came from a prominent family who owned lands in Cheshire and Suffolk. He was not deemed by her family to have a large enough fortune for them to live in fashionable society, but Caroline was ready for her matchmaking duties to be over, and the match was approved.

Sarah, perhaps perceiving the familial and social pressure, consented to the union. The male adults in their lives – Sir William Bunbury, Henry Fox, and her brother, the 3rd Duke of Richmond – negotiated the marriage settlement. Sir William was prepared to settle an annuity of £2,000 as well as "a house in town and country" on the couple. Such a small settlement led Sarah's relatives to assume it must be a love match. They were wed on 2 June 1762 in Holland House's chapel. Upon their marriage, they went to live at Barton Hall, Bunbury's country estate in Suffolk. He inherited his father's baronetcy in 1764.

=== Separation and divorce ===
The relationship was troubled nearly from the start. During their courtship, Sarah did not share her feelings and barely mentioned Bunbury in her letters, indicating a possible lack of enthusiasm. After the wedding, she viewed him as emotionally distant and quickly grew anxious for his affection. Bunbury's primary interest was horse racing, which often kept him away. Lonely in their country home and lacking funds, Sarah filled her days with modest distractions such as gardening and visiting the bustling market town of Bury St Edmunds, as well as seeking solace in her family. As a politician's wife, she was expected to host or attend local events and did so with enthusiasm. During one occasion, she reportedly secured 94 out of 100 votes while canvassing in the borough of Morpeth.

Sarah blamed herself for the failings of their marriage, which was also childless. Four years in, she grew tired of pretending it was successful and started behaving recklessly. She visited Paris, where her ostentatious flirting and gambling became the subject of gossip. She had relationships or affairs with several men, but the most prominent and long-lasting was with Lord William Gordon, an Army officer and younger son of Cosmo, 3rd Duke of Gordon. She gave birth to his illegitimate daughter, Louisa Bunbury, on 19 December 1768 and guiltily admitted the child's paternity to Bunbury. Seeking to avoid an embarrassing scandal, he agreed to raise Louisa but demanded that Sarah give up her lover. Sarah feared that leaving her husband would lead to her involuntary commitment, a circumstance that was not uncommon among unfaithful or troublesome wives. Nevertheless, she and Lord William eloped shortly afterwards to Knole House, the country estate of a friend. Morally, she felt that she could not impose an illegitimate child upon her husband. Bunbury refused to take her back, and Sarah returned to her brother's house with her daughter.

On 22 April 1769, her husband pursued a judicial separation through Doctors' Commons on the grounds of adultery:

Lady Sarah Bunbury, being of loose and abandoned disposition, and, being wholly unmindful of her conjugal vow, &c. did contract and carry on a lewd and adulterous conversation with [...] Lord William Gordon, and they had frequently carnal knowledge of each other: the party proponent therefore prays right [...] that he may be pronounced to be divorced from bed, board, and mutual cohabitation with [...] Lady Sarah Bunbury, his wife.

Bunbury's court filing, confirmed on 17 June 1769, invalidated his marriage agreement and served to protect his finances from any further children born to Sarah. Shortly after, she fled with Lord William to Scotland, staying there for half of the year to avoid public attention. Meanwhile, the affair was bringing dismay and disagreement to her family. Caroline found little fault in Bunbury's behaviour, placing the blame wholly on Sarah and her lover. Emily's husband accused Caroline of lax oversight and declared that the Duke of Richmond's will had been quite correct in placing his young daughters in their care. The family eventually persuaded Sarah to end the relationship, and so by December, she and her daughter were residing in a small manor house called Halnaker on the Lennox estate, Goodwood House. It was not until 14 May 1776 that the decree of divorce was issued, as they were expensive, rare, and required a private act of Parliament. The high cost stemmed from the necessity of filing three distinct lawsuits. While divorce was morally frowned upon, it had become more socially permissive in the 17th and 18th centuries as aristocratic men sought legal avenues to remarry and produce male heirs.

=== Press coverage and social exile ===
Within days of the couple's separation, the affair grew into a great scandal. Gossip swiftly spread at court and elsewhere; after a visit to Kensington Palace, the writer Lady Mary Coke came away with the news that "Lady Sarah ... had thrown off all regard to decency ... [her] story was all over the drawing room." Sarah's actions also gained widespread coverage in the British press. Aristocrats were prominent figures and their activities featured heavily in newspapers as production and readership increased during the 18th century. Stories of misconduct, which often combined fact and gossip, were a big driver of sales. Laden with guilt and self-loathing, Sarah did not pay the fee that would normally have suppressed such reporting.

Sarah's notoriety was enhanced by her previous connection to the king and her royal ancestry, as well as the general British public's antipathy towards openly licentious aristocrats. Town and Country, for instance, published a detailed description in April 1769 and declared "rank and beauty have been her ruin." While chastising Sarah as a "Messalina", that publication also lent sympathy to her situation, noting her as an example of the type of wife to avoid but also how not to treat one after marriage. The Morning Post, newly founded in 1772, quickly popularised scandal as entertainment; their reporting of the situation caused Sarah to complain that they were "full of lies and no news." When the finalisation of her divorce finally arrived in 1776, her sister Louisa was relieved that it coincided with the bigamy trial of Elizabeth Chudleigh, which garnered much media attention and diverted some public interest off Sarah.

In 18th-century Britain, a wife's public adultery typically meant the end of her social life. For twelve years, Sarah lived a self-described "solitary life" and was initially allowed to socialise only with family members; when other guests stayed at the Lennox estate, her brother ordered her to remain apart. Compared to her prior residences, Halnaker was small and outdated, so after seven years, he permitted the construction of a new home on his estate, called Molecomb House. Sarah possessed a deep interest in architecture – her family let her assist with the remodelling of Frescati House, her sister Emily's house in Ireland – and she was now able to work on her own home's design. The historian Amy Boyington writes that the Molecomb project "provided her with a sense of purpose and usefulness during the long years of social obscurity" and enabled her to finally "live independently and respectably." Economy was still necessary, but it allowed her to live in style and comfort. The finalisation of her divorce also permitted her to revert to using her maiden name and provided her with opportunities to travel away from Goodwood House, such as to Bath.

== Marriage to George Napier ==
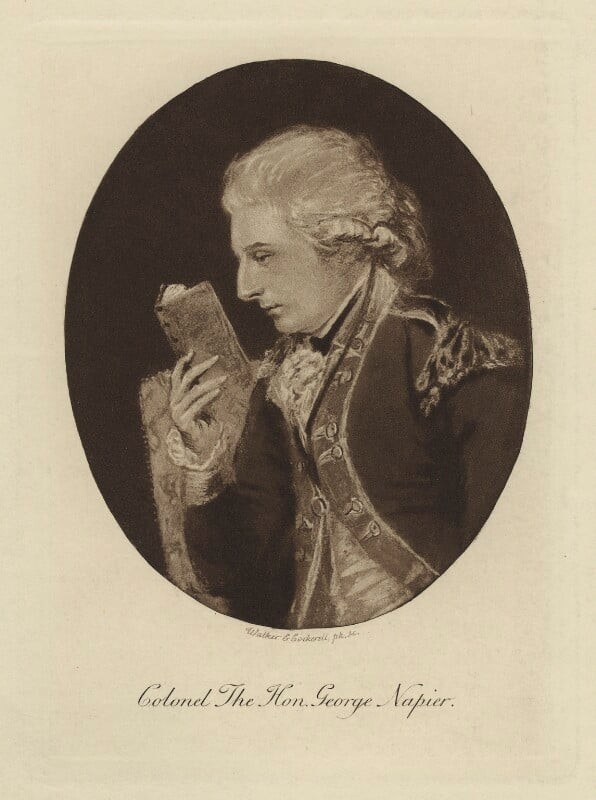
Sarah married the British Army officer George Napier in 1781.

In 1776, Lady Sarah befriended the Hon. George Napier, an impoverished army officer and younger son of the Scottish peer Francis Napier, 6th Lord Napier. Though the connection was made through her brother Lord George, their relationship drew concern from her family since Napier was already married. He was pressured to transfer to another regiment and saw active service in the ongoing American Revolutionary War. After the death of his wife, the pair were able to wed on 27 August 1781 at Goodwood House. The marriage was happy, and they had eight children:

- General Sir Charles James Napier (10 August 1782 – 29 August 1853); married Elizabeth Oakeley in 1827 and Frances Philipps in 1835.
- Emily Louisa Augusta Napier (1783–18 March 1863); married Lt.-Gen. Sir Henry Bunbury, 7th Baronet (nephew of her mother's first husband).
- Lieutenant-General Sir George Thomas Napier (30 June 1784 – 8 September 1855); married Margaret Craig in 1812 and had children; married Frances Blencowe in 1839.
- Lieutenant-General Sir William Francis Patrick Napier KCB (17 December 1785 – 12 February 1860); married Caroline-Amelia Fox (granddaughter of Henry and Caroline Fox) in 1812 and had children.
- Richard Napier (1787–13 January 1868); married Anna-Louisa Stewart, daughter of Sir James Stewart, 7th Baronet, in 1817.
- Captain Henry Edward Napier RN (5 March 1789 – 13 October 1853); married Caroline Bennett (an illegitimate daughter of his uncle, the 3rd Duke of Richmond) and had children.
- Caroline Napier (1790–1810); died of consumption.
- Cecilia Napier (1791–1808); died of consumption.

== Later life ==
=== Napier family ===
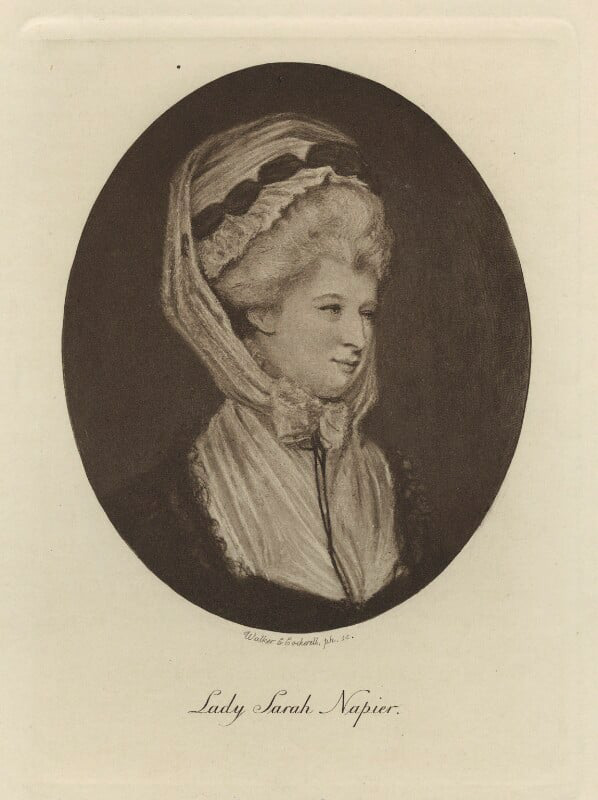
Lady Sarah Napier in later years

Though she never regained her former prominence, her new identity as Lady Sarah Napier allowed her to revive relationships with former friends in London. They had a limited income; Sarah only possessed a small annual allowance of £500 from her divorce settlement and often had to request the assistance of friends and relatives in finding military and government appointments for her husband. Buoyed with a sense of usefulness, she also helped George with administrative tasks – such as paying his recruiting officers – and grew to see herself as a military wife, rather than an indolent aristocrat from a failed marriage.

In August 1784, Louisa's husband, Thomas Conolly, allowed the growing family to live in his country home at Stretton Hall, Staffordshire. A few months later the Napiers moved in with the Conollys at Castletown House, near Emily, thus reuniting the three sisters in Ireland for the first time since their childhood. Three years later, Thomas helped the Napiers buy a modest home in nearby Celbridge. Sarah eventually resigned herself to the family's meagre standard of living, writing that "we can feed, clothe, and keep (at a common house in the village) our boys, though we can neither have carriages, dress, company or many luxuries."

George Napier's career brought them into contact with people from different classes, including conscripted men and common labourers. Sarah enjoyed this mixing of social ranks, and saw her sons raised as "servants of empire" alongside those of prosperous Irish families. Separated financially and politically from the power held by their Lennox relatives, they lacked a sense of belonging with the aristocratic class and instead were raised to idolise the military; four of them would have distinguished military careers in the British Army or Royal Navy – three generals and one captain.

Louisa Bunbury died of consumption at the age of seventeen, shortly after the birth of Sarah's third son. The grieving mother found solace in religion, praising her daughter's "angellick [sic] disposition" and writing that "her death carried up my thoughts to that Heaven where I know she is." Her second daughter, Emily Napier, was raised by her childless sister Louisa. Sarah had a warm relationship with her five sons, later writing that she strove to be a friend whom they could confide in while leaving their "management" to her husband. While George gave them a sense of duty and provided military training, she oversaw everything else; she passed on her love of literature, including of her favourite story, Alexander Pope's translation of the Iliad.

=== Widowhood and death ===
George Napier's health steadily worsened, and he died on 13 October 1804 at the age of fifty-three. His death devastated Sarah, who wrote, "I have lost him who made me like this world. It is now a dreary expanse ... while he lived, I saw all objects through the medium of my own happiness." George's will had left her nearly everything, including his debts. To economise, Sarah moved in with her widowed sister Louisa and sought financial assistance from King George as repayment for her husband's faithful career in the Crown's service. At first she received no reply, but after asking a friend to appeal directly to Queen Charlotte, the king granted her a pension of £800, nearly 50 years after his earlier courtship had ended in her humiliation.

Lady Sarah returned to London and used the funds to repay debts and buy a residence at Cadogan Place for £1,600. In later years, Sarah's diminishing eyesight left her reliant on her daughter Emily, with whom she closely and proudly tracked the activities of her sons engaged in the Napoleonic Wars. They earned much distinction in the Peninsular campaign, leading Lord Wellington to send Sarah letters of praise about their exploits. Her two youngest children, Cecilia and Caroline, died of consumption in 1808 and 1810, respectively. Sarah's mind began to fail by 1818, but she was lucid enough to be aware of Louisa's death in 1821, which left her as the last surviving Lennox sister. At age eighty-one, Sarah died on 26 August 1826 at Cadogan Place among her remaining children. She was buried on 30 August at St Mary on Paddington Green Church, London.

== Legacy ==
During her lifetime, Lady Sarah was widely regarded as a society beauty; one contemporary publication, The Man of Pleasure's Pocket Book, listed her among its top three women known for beauty, grace, and elegance. She attracted substantial media interest in a time of growing readership for scandalous news. Between 1769 and 1772, she – alongside the high-profile divorces of Henrietta Grosvenor and Penelope Ligonier – captivated London's press and gossip circles, becoming a long-standing symbol of feminine dissoluteness in high society. The historian Soile Ylivuori speculates that Sarah might have avoided media attention had her only offence been adultery. Her clear pregnancy and impulsive choice to flee her husband's home helped to magnify the affair by violating the rules of social propriety. Her reputation also became further connected to King George III beyond their early relationship; during one of his episodes of mental illness in 1788, he invoked Sarah's name which contributed to his reputation of secretly being a deeply repressed sexual puritan.

=== Depictions in art and literature ===
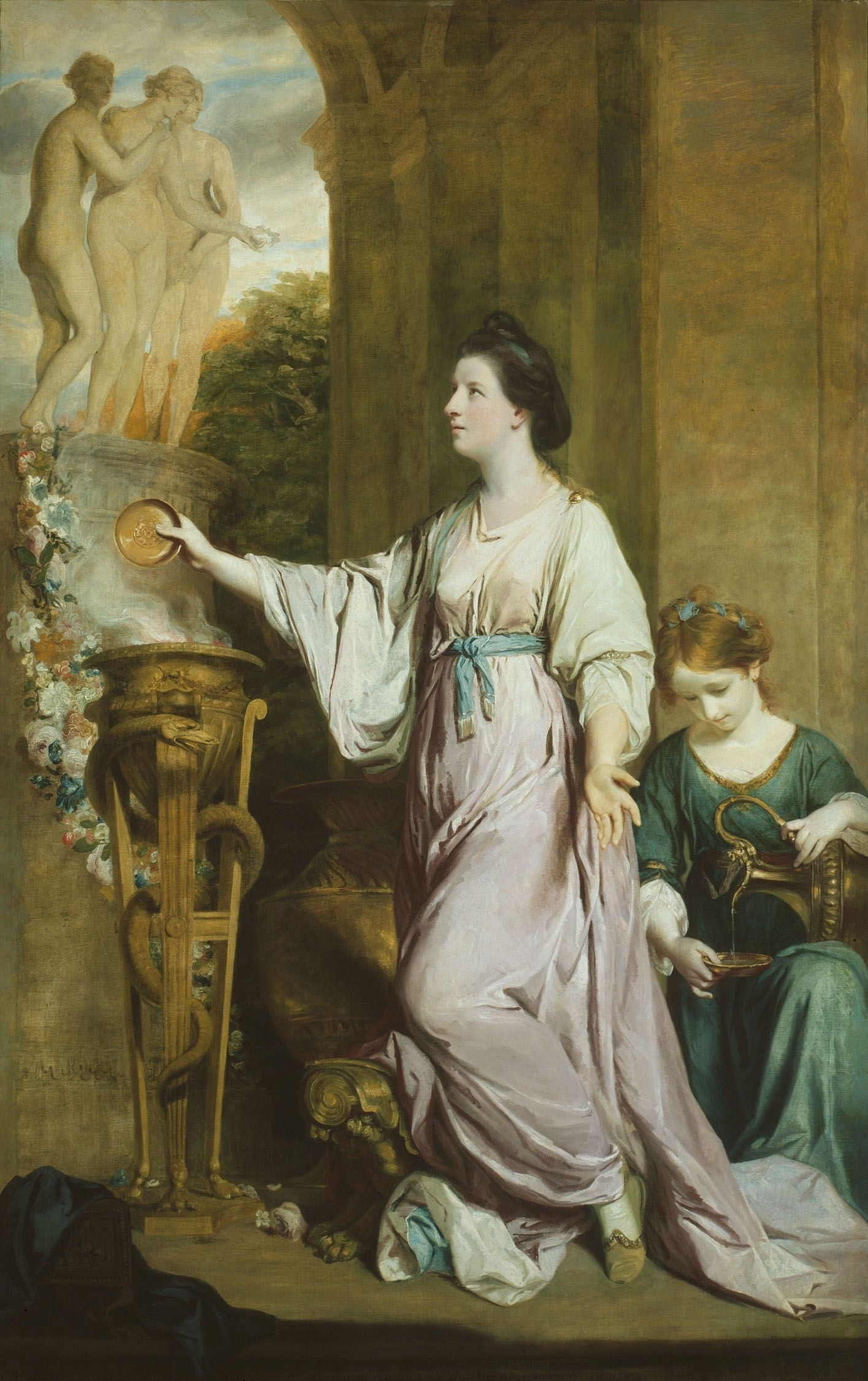
Charles Bunbury commissioned Lady Sarah Bunbury Sacrificing to the Graces, which was completed in 1765.

Sarah was the subject of multiple works of art, including engravings and paintings, which were swiftly reproduced. A year into their marriage, Charles Bunbury commissioned a portrait of his wife with the society painter, Sir Joshua Reynolds. The work, Lady Sarah Bunbury Sacrificing to the Graces, is now on display at the Art Institute of Chicago. The portrait represents one of Reynolds's first – and most theatrical – efforts to fuse the genre of history painting with his modern subjects, often by placing them in historical dress amid classical scenery. It inspired the caricaturist James Gillray's 1787 parody La Belle Assemblêe, which depicts five women who do not meet the idealistic beauty standards often portrayed in Georgian art.

Throughout their lives, the Lennox sisters maintained regular correspondence with each other. Though not all their letters survived, they still provide almost a century's worth of intimate insight into the ordinary lives of highly connected women during the Georgian era. For scholars of Irish history, they represent the largest collection of first-hand accounts of aristocratic domestic life and have impacted much of the period's scholarship. Historians such as A. P. W. Malcomson have viewed this outsized impact as concerning, as their views of elite society in Ascendancy Ireland were often disdainful.

Seventy-five years after Sarah's death, Mary and Henry Fox-Strangways edited a two-volume collection of her correspondence. Published in 1901 as The Life and Letters of Lady Sarah Lennox, 1745-1826, it includes nearly 60 years of letters with her close friend Susan Fox-Strangways and others. The New York Times in 1902 described the publication as "peculiarly interesting" correspondence that "preserves the memory of many noteworthy persons in graphic, intimate descriptions ... [from] a truly excellent mind whose discretion was only surpassed by its indiscretion."

Sarah has appeared in many works of fiction and non-fiction. The American writer Edith Roelker Curtis drew upon the Fox-Strangways collection to publish a 1946 biography entitled Lady Sarah Lennox, An Irrepressible Stuart. The English writer Priscilla Napier published many books about her husband's ancestors, including a 1971 biography entitled The Sword Dance: Lady Sarah Lennox and the Napiers; drawing extensively from her letters, the work chronicles Sarah's early life at the British court, her ensuing two marriages, and the military careers of her sons. In 1994, the historian Stella Tillyard published a biography of the Lennox sisters that drew upon thousands of their letters. Entitled Aristocrats, it was later adapted into a six-part drama series and released in 1999; Sarah was portrayed by the actress Jodhi May.
