= Henry Edward Napier =

British naval officer and historian

Captain Henry Edward Napier FRS
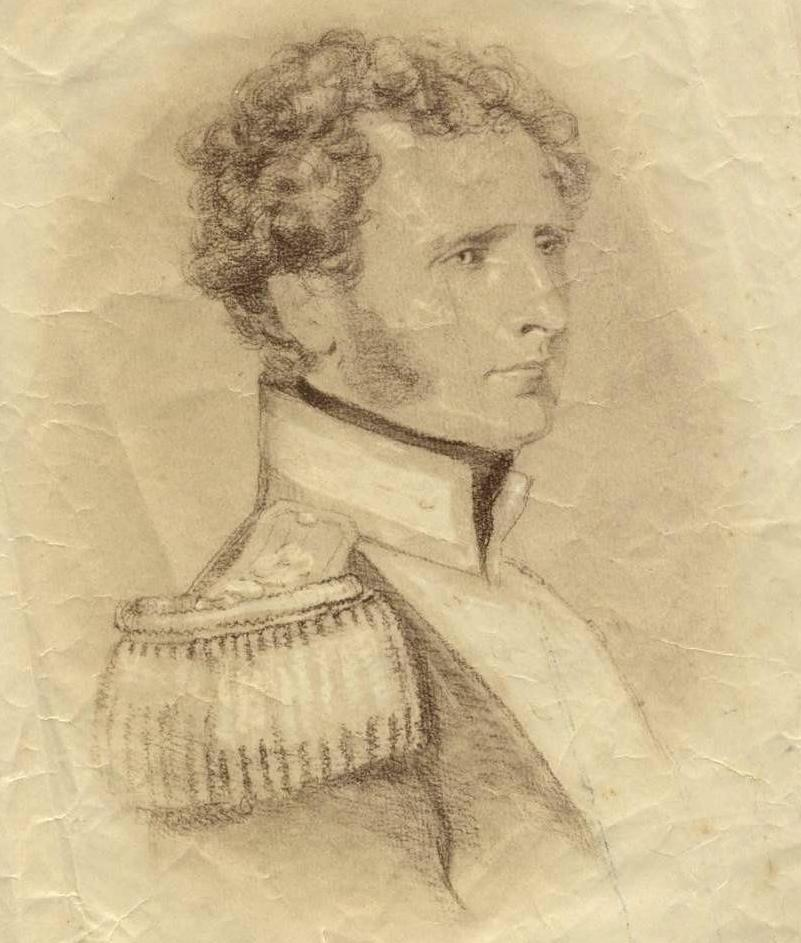
- Henry Edward Napier
- Born: 5 March 1789
- Died: 13 October 1853 (aged 64); London, England
- Military career
- Allegiance: United Kingdom
- Branch: Royal Navy
- Service years: 1803–1830
- Rank: Captain
- Commands: HMS Goree; HMS Rifleman; HMS Jaseur; HMS Pelorus
- Conflicts: Napoleonic Wars

Henry Edward Napier (5 March 1789 – 13 October 1853) was a British naval officer and historian.

== Family background ==
He was the fifth son of Colonel the Honourable George Napier, and his second wife, Lady Sarah Lennox, seventh daughter of the 2nd Duke of Richmond, and one of the famed Lennox sisters. His brothers included General Sir Charles James Napier, Commander-in-Chief, India and conqueror of Sindh; Lieutenant-General Sir George Thomas Napier, Governor and Commander of the Cape of Good Hope; and General Sir William Francis Patrick Napier, Lieutenant Governor of Guernsey, and author of the History of the Peninsular War.

== Naval career ==
Napier entered the Royal Naval Academy at Portsmouth Dockyard on 5 May 1803, and on 20 September 1806 joined the 74-gun Spencer, as a first-class volunteer. In her under the Captains the Honourable Robert Stopford and John Quilliam, he visited the Cape of Good Hope, and as a midshipman took part in the Bombardment of Copenhagen, also assisting in the destruction of Fleckeroe Castle, on the coast of Norway. From December 1808 until September 1811 he served in the East Indies aboard the frigate Clorinde under Captain Thomas Briggs; the 74-gun Russell, flagship of Vice-Admiral William O'Bryen Drury, and the frigate Diomede, Captain Hugh Cook. He was appointed acting-lieutenant of the Diomede on 31 October 1809, receiving his commission on 4 May 1810.

In 1812–13 he served aboard the 74-gun Chatham, Captain Graham Moore, and the frigates Minerva, Captain Richard Hawkins, and Nymphe, Captain Farmery Predam Epworth, on the North Sea and North American stations. On 7 June 1814, he was promoted to commander aboard the 18-gun sloop Goree at Bermuda; and soon after appointed to the brig-sloop Rifleman, employed in protecting merchant vessels in the Bay of Fundy. In August 1815 Napier went on half-pay, having declined accepting a piece of plate that had been voted to him for his care in the conduct of convoys between the port of Saint John, New Brunswick and Castine, Maine. His last appointments were to the Jaseur at Halifax from January 1821 to July 1823, and to the Pelorus at Plymouth, for a brief period in 1826. He was promoted to captain on 31 December 1830.

== Writing career ==
Napier was elected a fellow of the Royal Society on 18 May 1820. His chief work was the Florentine History from the earliest Authentic Records to the Accession of Ferdinand the Third, Grandduke of Tuscany, in six volumes, published in 1846–47.

== Personal life ==
On 17 November 1823 Napier married his first cousin, Caroline Bennet (died 5 September 1836), in Florence). She was the illegitimate daughter of his uncle Charles Lennox, 3rd Duke of Richmond. They had five children:

- Augusta Sarah (born 1826) married Frederick Williams-Freeman, grandson of Adm. William Peere Williams-Freeman.
- Charles George (20 July 1829 – 2 September 1882) married Susanna Juliana Ricarda Carolin, daughter of Samuel Carolin, on 13 December 1860. They had one son, and two daughters.
- Adelaide Harriet Sophia (1831–1832)
- Arthur Lennox (1833–1839)
- Vice-Adm. Richard Henry (11 March 1836 – 1 March 1903) married twice. Firstly, Mary Dyer in 1861. Secondly, Mary Teresa Priest in 1883. No known issue.

Napier died at 62 Cadogan Place, London, on 13 October 1853.
