= Governor Napier =

Governor Napier may refer to:

- Francis Napier, 10th Lord Napier (1819–1898), Governor of Madras from 1866 to 1872
- Robert Napier, 1st Baron Napier of Magdala (1810–1890), Governor of Gibraltar from 1876 to 1883
- George Thomas Napier (1784–1855), Governor of the Cape Colony from 1838 to 1844
