= Edith Roelker Curtis =

American novelist (born 1893–1977)

- Born: July 29, 1893; East Greenwich, Rhode Island, U.S.
- Died: February 1, 1977 (aged 83); Dublin, New Hampshire, U.S.
- Occupation: Biographer; historian; diarist
- Spouse: Charles Pelham Curtis, Jr.

Edith Roelker Curtis (1893–1977) was a New England writer, historian, and diarist.

== Early life, education, and social activities ==
Edith Goddard Roelker was born on July 29, 1893, to William and Eleanor (Jenckes) Roelker. Her mother's roots in Rhode Island stretched back to the colonial era, and Edith grew up in a privileged environment on an East Greenwich homestead and in a city residence in Providence. With the marriage strained by Eleanor's alcoholism, the Roelkers divorced in 1901. Edith attended school in Providence and lived for a time with an aunt in Cincinnati. She subsequently attended the elite Miss Porter's School in Farmington, Connecticut, between 1909 and 1912 but left before receiving a degree. She made her society debut in 1912.

Two years later, she married Charles Pelham Curtis Jr., a Harvard Law student and member of a similarly distinguished Boston family. Charles became a partner at the Choate, Hall & Stewart firm, and the couple lived in Boston's Back Bay neighborhood until they moved to Norfolk, Massachusetts, in 1924. They had five children: Sarah (called Sally) (b. 1915), Anita (b. 1917), Charles (b. 1919), William, and Richard. During the First World War, Edith volunteered for the Red Cross. She was active in Boston club life, becoming a member of the Nucleus, Chilton Club, and Boston Sewing Circle (a predecessor to the Junior League), among others. The clubs functioned as hubs of high society, but Edith also participated in the cultural events and volunteer activities sponsored by the groups. She maintained an interest in literary and social organizations throughout her life.

== Literary career ==
Edith Curtis's literary ambitions were awakened after the birth of her third child, and she undertook course work in composition and English literature at Radcliffe College. She published small pieces through the 1920s. Inspired by the celebration of the Boston tercentennial, she released a full-length book, Anne Hutchinson: A Biography in 1930. As her professional writing career developed, her marriage foundered. Charles's extramarital affairs prompted a divorce in 1936 when Edith discovered in a gossip column that her husband had registered at a New York hotel with his mistress. Given the prominent standing of the family, the divorce caused scandal in Boston social circles.

While maintaining an active social life and overseeing a large household, Edith continued to write as her children grew up and left the home. Short works appeared in magazines and newspapers throughout the 1930s. A second historical biography, Lady Sarah Lennox, An Irrepressible Stuart, was published by Putnam in 1946 and was also released in London and Brazil. This extensively researched narration of the life of the notorious royal consort was reportedly enjoyed by the British royal family and Winston Churchill.

Moving to Dublin, New Hampshire, in the mid-1950s, where she would remain until her death in 1977, Curtis became an avid gardener and bird-watcher while still publishing historical sketches, book reviews, and travel essays. She covered eclectic topics in magazine and newspaper articles, which ranged from scholarly pieces in academic journals to pulp stories in confessional magazines. Her most noted book, A Season in Utopia, The Story of Brook Farm, was published in 1961 and reprinted in 1971. This history of the Massachusetts Transcendentalist commune was widely reviewed, and it won the National League of American Pen Women's 1962 prize for the best work of non-fiction. Curtis later assisted greatly in the successful effort to designate the endangered site of Brook Farm in West Roxbury a national historical landmark.

== Later writings and death ==
In the 1960s, Edith Roelker Curtis became an increasingly prolific writer of fiction and verse, exploring more personal and contemporary topics than her historical works. A novella about Gilded Age Rhode Island, Love’s Random Dart, came out in 1962, and the full-length novel, Mexican Romance, was published in 1969.

At the same time, Curtis spent many years researching and writing a biography of Josiah Tattnall III, a naval officer who became a commander in the Confederate Navy during the Civil War. Though she was not able to complete this book project, she distributed her research and writings to the National Archives and Records Administration and the Sophia Smith Collection in hopes that the work would be completed. Her unpublished diaries, which cover many years between the 1920s and 1970s, provide a perspective on a troubled marriage and complex family life, the struggle to make a writing career, and day-to-day observations of New England life.

Edith Roelker Curtis died in Dublin, New Hampshire, on February 1, 1977, at the age of 83.

== Additional Information ==
- Edith Roelker Curtis Papers, 1893-1977, Sophia Smith Collection, Smith College.
