= Lennox sisters =

Four 18th-century British aristocrats

The Lennox sisters were four eighteenth-century British aristocrats, the daughters of Charles Lennox, 2nd Duke of Richmond (1701–1750) by his wife Lady Sarah Cadogan (1705–1751).

The Lennox sisters became well known after the publication in 1994 by a book of the historian Stella Tillyard, Aristocrats, heavily drawn on letters left by the four sisters. The book became a bestseller and was translated in Danish, Dutch, French, German, Italian, Portuguese and Swedisch. In 1999, the BBC adapted Stella Tillyard's book as a six-part miniseries called Aristocrats. This BBC-adaption made the Lennox sisters world famous.

The four sisters were:

- Caroline Fox, 1st Baroness Holland (1723–1774),
- Emily FitzGerald, Duchess of Leinster (1731–1814),
- Lady Louisa Conolly (1743–1821),
- Lady Sarah Napier (1745–1826)

They all married prominent men and attracted varying degrees of admiration or notoriety. A fifth sister (Cecilia, 1750-1769) died unmarried aged 19, and three others (Louisa Margaret, 1725-1728; Anne, 1726-1727; Margaret, 1739-1741) in childhood.

== Ancestry ==
They were the daughters of Charles Lennox, 2nd Duke of Richmond, by his wife Sarah Cadogan (1705–1751), a daughter of General William Cadogan. Their paternal grandfather was an illegitimate son of King Charles II.

Ancestors of Lennox sisters

Charles II of England
Charles Lennox, 1st Duke of Richmond
Louise de Kérouaille, Duchess of Portsmouth
Charles Lennox, 2nd Duke of Richmond
Francis Brudenell, Lord Brudenell
Anne Brudenell
Frances Savile
Lennox sisters
Henry Cadogan
William Cadogan, 1st Earl Cadogan
Bridget Waller
Sarah Cadogan
Jan Munter de Jonge, Heer van Zanen en Raaphorst
Margaret Cecilia Munter
Margaretha Trip

== Caroline (1723–1774) ==
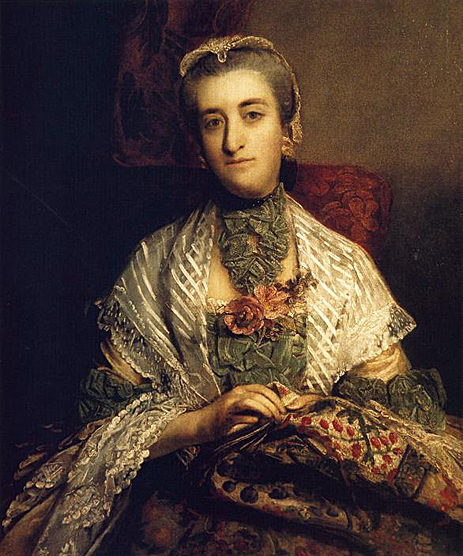
Caroline, 1757/8, Sir Joshua Reynolds

Georgiana Caroline Lennox was born on 27 March 1723. In 1744, at the age of 21, she eloped with Henry Fox, a Whig politician. He was the brother of Stephen, first Earl of Ilchester, and son of politician Sir Stephen Fox. Though she was eventually reconciled with her parents, she was snubbed in her father's will by not being given the guardianship of her three youngest sisters. In 1762, she was raised to the peerage as Baroness Holland of Holland in the County of Lincolnshire. Her husband became Baron Holland of Foxley in the County of Wiltshire the next year. Her three surviving sons (one other died young) were dissipated, caused her great grief over their gambling, and this may have contributed to her death. She died on 24 July 1774, soon after Henry Fox.

== Emily (1731–1814) ==
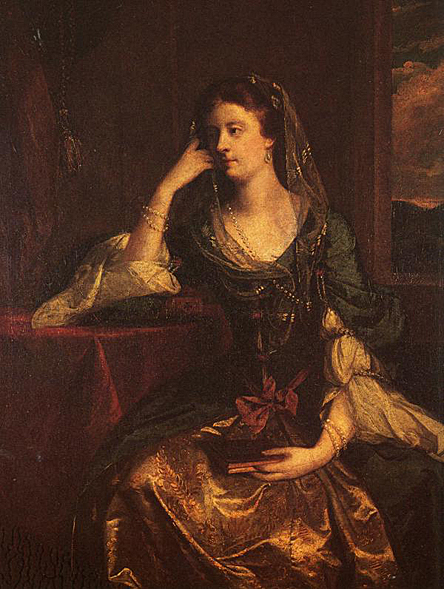
Emily, 1753, Sir Joshua Reynolds

Emilia Mary Lennox was born on 6 October 1731 and died on 27 March 1814. On 7 February 1747 she married James Fitzgerald, 20th Earl of Kildare and 1st Duke of Leinster, becoming Emily Fitzgerald, Duchess of Leinster. The couple had at least nineteen children, eleven of whom survived to adulthood. Fourteen of her children predeceased her. Lord George Simon FitzGerald (16 April 1773 – May 1783) was recognised as the son of Lord Kildare and Emily Mary Lennox, but in fact was the biological child of the Fitzgerald children's tutor, William Ogilvie. In 1774, a year after her husband died in 1773, Emily outraged society in Ireland by marrying Ogilvie in France. With Ogilvie she had four more children. The couple returned from France in 1779.

== Louisa (1743–1821) ==
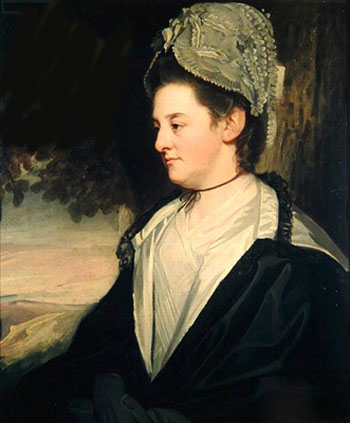
Louisa, 1776, Sir George Romney

Louise Augusta Lennox was born on 5 December 1743. On the deaths of her father, in 1750, and mother in 1751, when she was eight years old, she went to Ireland to live with her elder sister, Emily, in accordance with the provisions of her father's will. In 1758, she married Thomas Conolly, of Castletown, County Kildare, becoming Louise Conolly. The couple had no children. Louisa was involved in charitable works in Castletown, including the building of an industrial school and several other buildings. She managed her husband's estate after his death.

== Sarah (1745–1826) ==
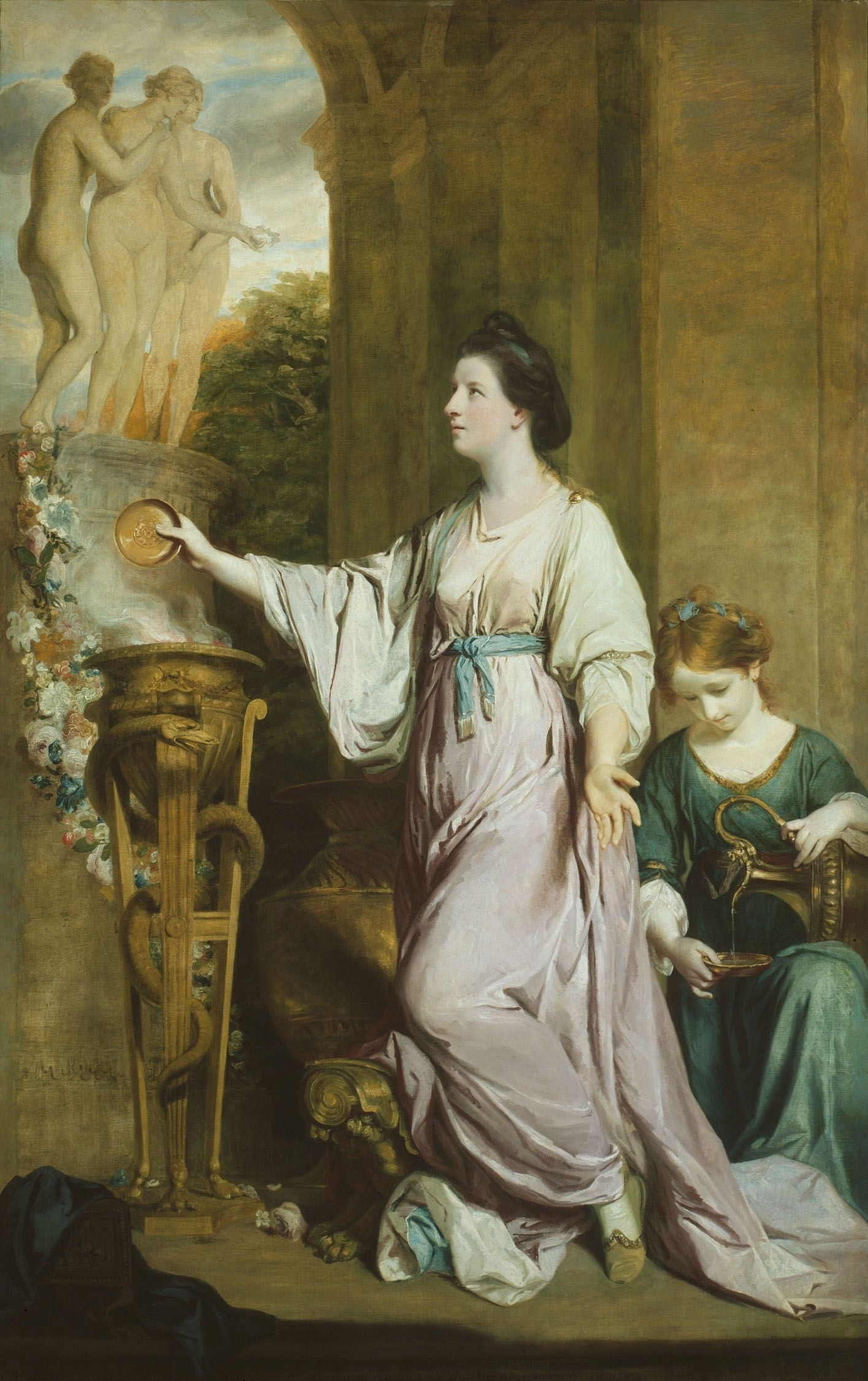
Sarah, 1765, Sir Joshua Reynolds

Sarah Lennox was raised in Ireland by her sister Emily, in accordance with the provisions of her father's will, her parents having died when she was six years old. She caught the eye of the young Prince of Wales, later George III, who, after ascending the throne, hinted that he was considering her as a wife but never proposed. In 1762, she married Charles Bunbury. They had no issue. Lady Sarah embarked on an adulterous affair with Lord William Gordon and bore him a daughter, called Louisa Bunbury, in 1768. Bunbury divorced her in 1776. In 1781, Lady Sarah contracted a much- happier second marriage with Hon. George Napier, by whom she had eight children.

== Cecilia (1750–1769) ==
Cecily Margaret Lennox, sometimes called Cecilia, was born in 1750. Her parents died in 1750 and 1751 when she was only a year old, and Cecilia, along with her sisters Louisa and Sarah, was raised by her sister Emily in Ireland. As a young woman, she fell ill with a wasting disease—possibly tuberculosis—and her older siblings sent her first to Lyons Gate and then to France in a vain effort to recover her strength. She died in Paris on 13 November 1769.

== Other sisters and brothers ==
While four Lennox sisters lived to mature adulthood and a fifth lived until she was 19, three others died in childhood: Louisa Margaret (1725–1728), Anne (1726–1727), and Margaret (1739–1741). The Lennox sisters had two brothers who lived to adulthood, Charles Lennox, 3rd Duke of Richmond (1735–1806), and Lord George Lennox (1737–1805), as well as two others who died in infancy.

== Dramatisation ==
- In 1999, the BBC adapted Stella Tillyard's book as a six-part miniseries called Aristocrats. The top cast production received 5 nominations.
