= Sarah Lennox, Duchess of Richmond =

English noble (1705-1751)

Her Grace The Duchess of Richmond
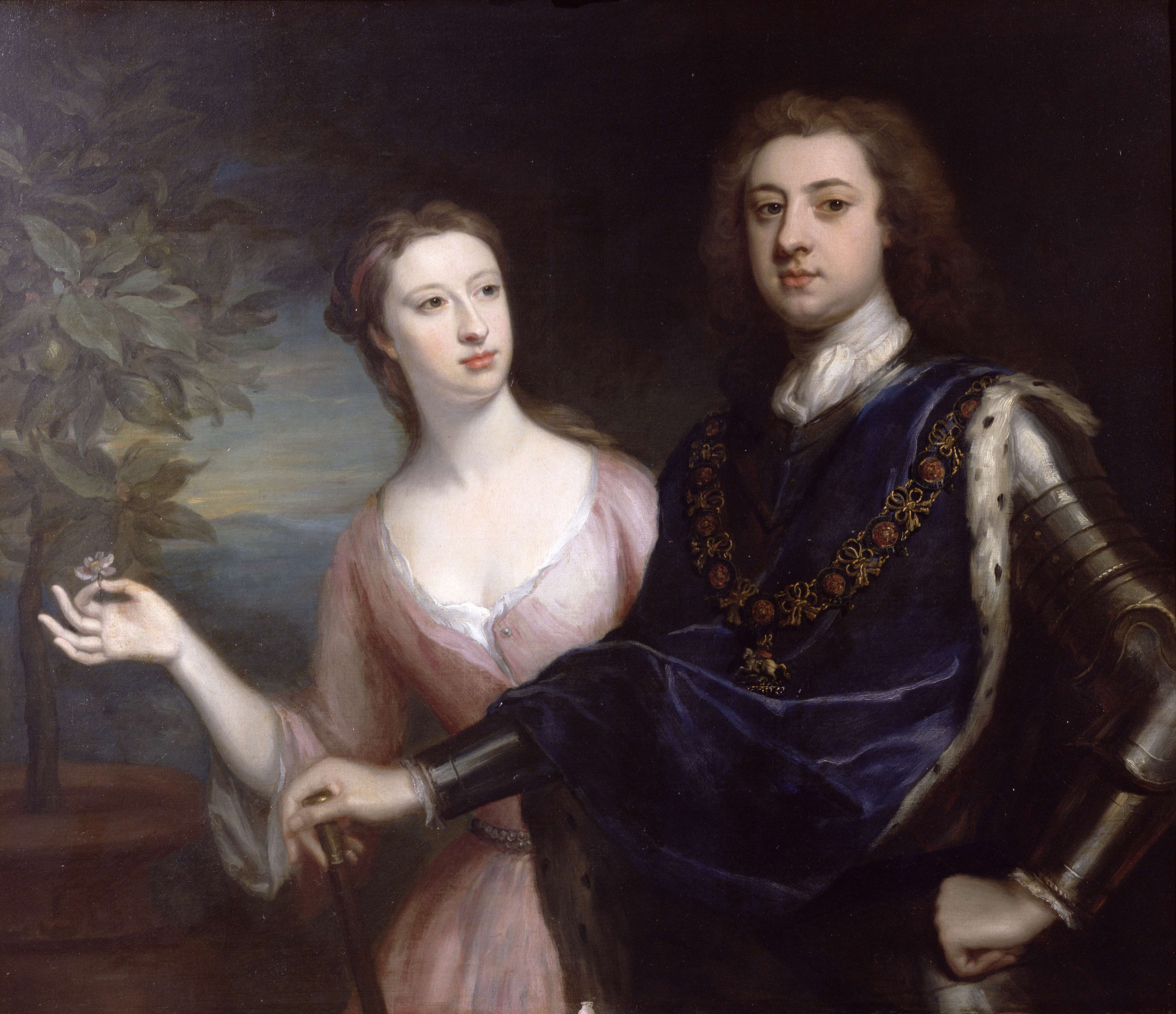
- The Duke and the Duchess of Richmond, by Jonathan Richardson. This portrait was made at the request of the Duke's grandmother Louise de Kérouaille, who wanted a portrait of her grandson and his wife.
- Born: 18 September 1705
- Died: 25 August 1751 (aged 45)
- Spouse: Charles Lennox, 2nd Duke of Richmond (m. 1719; died 1750)
- Children: Caroline Fox, 1st Baroness Holland; Emily FitzGerald, Duchess of Leinster; Charles Lennox, 3rd Duke of Richmond; Lord George Lennox; Lady Louisa Conolly; Lady Sarah Napier; Lady Cecilia Lennox
- Parents: William Cadogan, 1st Earl Cadogan; Margaretta Munter

Sarah Lennox, Duchess of Richmond (née Cadogan; 18 September 1705 – 25 August 1751), was Lady of the Bedchamber to Queen Caroline from 1724 to 1737. She was the mother of the famous Lennox sisters and the heir to the title, the "radical Duke".

== Early life ==
She was born Sarah Cadogan at The Hague, the eldest daughter of William Cadogan (from 1716 1st Baron Cadogan of Reading and from 1722 1st Earl Cadogan) and his wife, Margaretta Cecilia Munter. She was brought up in a convent and at the age of fourteen was married, on 4 December 1719, to Charles Lennox, Earl of March, at The Hague. The marriage was arranged by both fathers in order to cancel a gambling debt incurred by Lord Cadogan; after the marriage the Earl of March, aged eighteen, embarked on his Grand Tour. On his return in 1722, the earl was reluctant to meet Sarah; he went to the theatre, glimpsed a young woman and asked who she was. "You must be a stranger in London not to know the toast of the town, the beautiful Lady March", was the reply. In 1723, Charles succeeded to his father's title of Duke of Richmond, whereupon Sarah became Duchess of Richmond. They had a well-publicised happy and companionable marriage, which produced many children.)

== Courtier and philanthropist ==
Sarah was appointed a Lady of the Bedchamber to Caroline of Ansbach when Princess of Wales, and remained in the post when Caroline became queen consort in 1727. She received a salary of £500 per year but, despite the fact that the post represented the highest possible position at court, she would have carried out mundane duties, including ordering meals and clothes and dispatching servants to run errands.

Sarah was one of the twenty-one "ladies of quality and distinction" who signed Thomas Coram's first petition, presented to George II in 1735, calling for the foundation of the Foundling Hospital. She signed the petition on 22 December 1729 and was the first Lady of the Bedchamber to the Queen recruited by Coram. Her husband signed the Royal Charter in 1739.

== Collecting ==
In the 1730s and 1740s, Sarah and her daughters were enthusiastic collectors of shells brought by naval captains returning to Portsmouth. They arranged the shells into elaborate patterns that were incorporated into a grotto in the park of the family's home in Sussex, Goodwood House.

== Children ==
Sarah had twenty-three pregnancies, but many did not come to term. The children are:

- Lady Georgiana Carolina Lennox (27 March 1723 – 24 July 1774), who married Henry Fox, 1st Baron Holland.
- Charles Lennox, Earl of March (3 September 1724 – 1724), who died in infancy.
- Lady Louisa Margaret Lennox (15 November 1725 – May 1728), who died in early childhood.
- Lady Anne Lennox (27 May 1726 – 1727), who died in early childhood.
- Charles Lennox, Earl of March (9 September 1730 – November 1730), who died in infancy.
- Lady Emilia Mary Lennox (6 October 1731 – 27 March 1814), who married first James FitzGerald, 1st Duke of Leinster and secondly William Ogilvie and had issue.
- Charles Lennox, 3rd Duke of Richmond (22 February 1735 – 29 December 1806).
- Lord George Lennox (29 November 1737 – 25 March 1805), a general.
- Lady Margaret Lennox (16 November 1739 – 10 January 1741), who died in early childhood.
- Lady Louisa Augusta Lennox (24 November 1743 – 1821), who married Thomas Connolly but had no issue.
- Lady Sarah Lennox (14 February 1745 – August 1826), who married first Sir Charles Bunbury, 6th Baronet, and had a daughter (although not with her husband, but with Lord William Gordon); and secondly George Napier.
- Lady Cecilia Lennox (28 February 1750 – 21 November 1769), who died unmarried.

Only half of the children lived to adulthood.

== Popular culture ==
In 1999, a six-part BBC miniseries based on the lives of her daughters aired in the U.K. It was called Aristocrats and the Duchess was played by Diane Fletcher.
