= William Napier (British Army officer, born 1785) =

British Army officer and historian

General Sir William Napier KCB
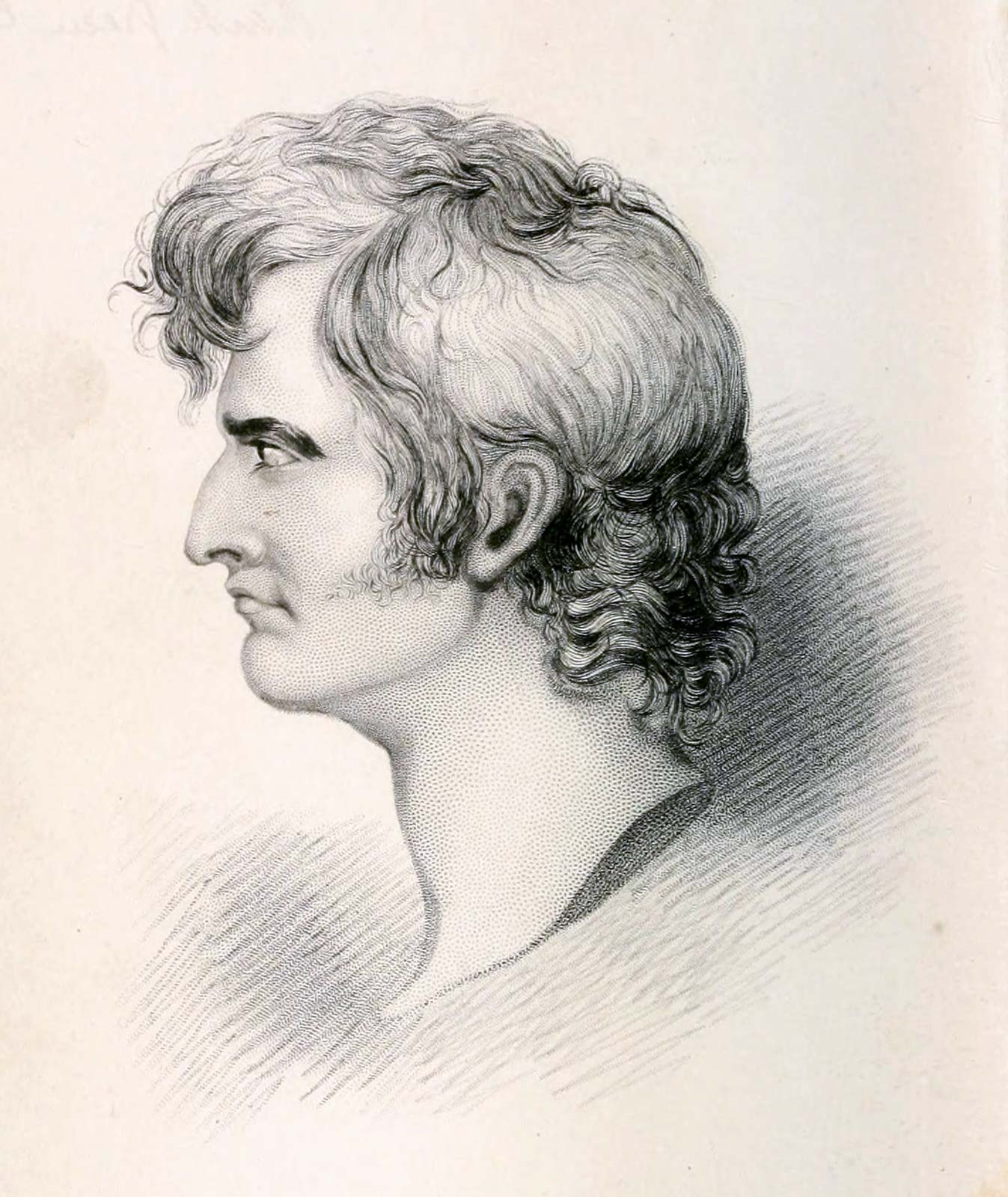
- 1855 portrait
- Born: 7 December 1785; Celbridge, County Kildare
- Died: 12 February 1860 (aged 74); Clapham, London
- Burial place: West Norwood Cemetery, West Norwood; 51°25′59″N 0°05′53″W
- Military career
- Allegiance: Great Britain; United Kingdom
- Branch: British Army
- Service years: 1800–1819
- Rank: General
- Units: Royal Irish Artillery; 62nd Regiment of Foot; 52nd Regiment of Foot; 43rd Regiment of Foot
- Commands: 43rd Regiment of Foot
- Conflicts: Peninsular War
- Awards: Knight Commander of the Order of the Bath
- Other work: Author and historian

General Sir William Francis Patrick Napier, KCB (7 December 1785 – 12 February 1860) was a British Army officer and historian.

== Early life ==
Napier was born at Celbridge in County Kildare, the third son of Colonel George Napier (1751–1804) and his wife, Lady Sarah Lennox (1745–1826).

== Military service ==
He became an ensign in the Royal Irish Artillery in 1800, but at once exchanged into the 62nd, and was put on half-pay in 1802. He was afterwards made a cornet in the Royal Horse Guards by the influence of his uncle the Duke of Richmond, and for the first time did actual military duty in this regiment, but he soon accepted Sir John Moore's suggestion that he should exchange into the 52nd, which was about to be trained at Shorncliffe Army Camp. Through Sir John Moore he soon obtained a company in the 43rd, joined that regiment at Shorncliffe and became a favourite with Moore.

He served in Denmark, and was present at the Battle of Køge and, his regiment being shortly afterwards sent to Spain, took part in the retreat to Corunna, the hardships of which permanently impaired his health. In 1809 he became aide-de-camp to his cousin the Duke of Richmond, Lord Lieutenant of Ireland, but joined the 43rd when that regiment was ordered again to Spain. With the light brigade (the 43rd, 52nd, and 95th), under the command of General Craufurd, he was on the march to Talavera which he described in his History, and had a violent attack of pleurisy on the way.

He, however, refused to leave Spain, was wounded on the Coa, and shot near the spine at Cazal Nova. After taking part in the pursuit of Masséna after he left the lines of Torres Vedras, he and his brother George were recommended for a brevet majority. He became Brigade Major, was present at Fuentes d'Onoro, but an attack of fever obliged him to return to England.

In England he married his cousin Caroline Amelia Fox, daughter of General Henry Edward Fox and niece of the statesman Charles James Fox. They had a number of children, one of whom, Pamela Adelaide Napier, married Philip William Skynner Miles and had a son, Philip Napier Miles. Another daughter, Louisa Augusta Napier, married General Sir Patrick Leonard MacDougall.

Three weeks after his marriage he again went to Spain, and was present at the Siege of Badajoz, where his friend Colonel McLeod was killed. In the absence of the new Lieutenant-Colonel he took command of the 43rd regiment (he was now a substantive Major) and commanded it at the Battle of Salamanca. After a short stay at home he again joined his regiment at the Pyrenees, and secured the most strongly fortified part of Marshal Jean-de-Dieu Soult's position at the Battle of Nivelle. He served with his regiment at the battles of the Nive, where he received two wounds, Orthes, and Toulouse. For his services he was made brevet Lieutenant-Colonel, and one of the first Companions of the Bath. Like his brother Charles he then entered the military college at Farnham. He commanded his regiment in the invasion of France after the Battle of Waterloo, and remained in France with the army of occupation until 1819, when he retired on half-pay. As could not live on a Major's half-pay with a wife and family, he decided to become an artist, taking a house in Sloane Street, where he studied with George Jones, the academician.

== Historian ==
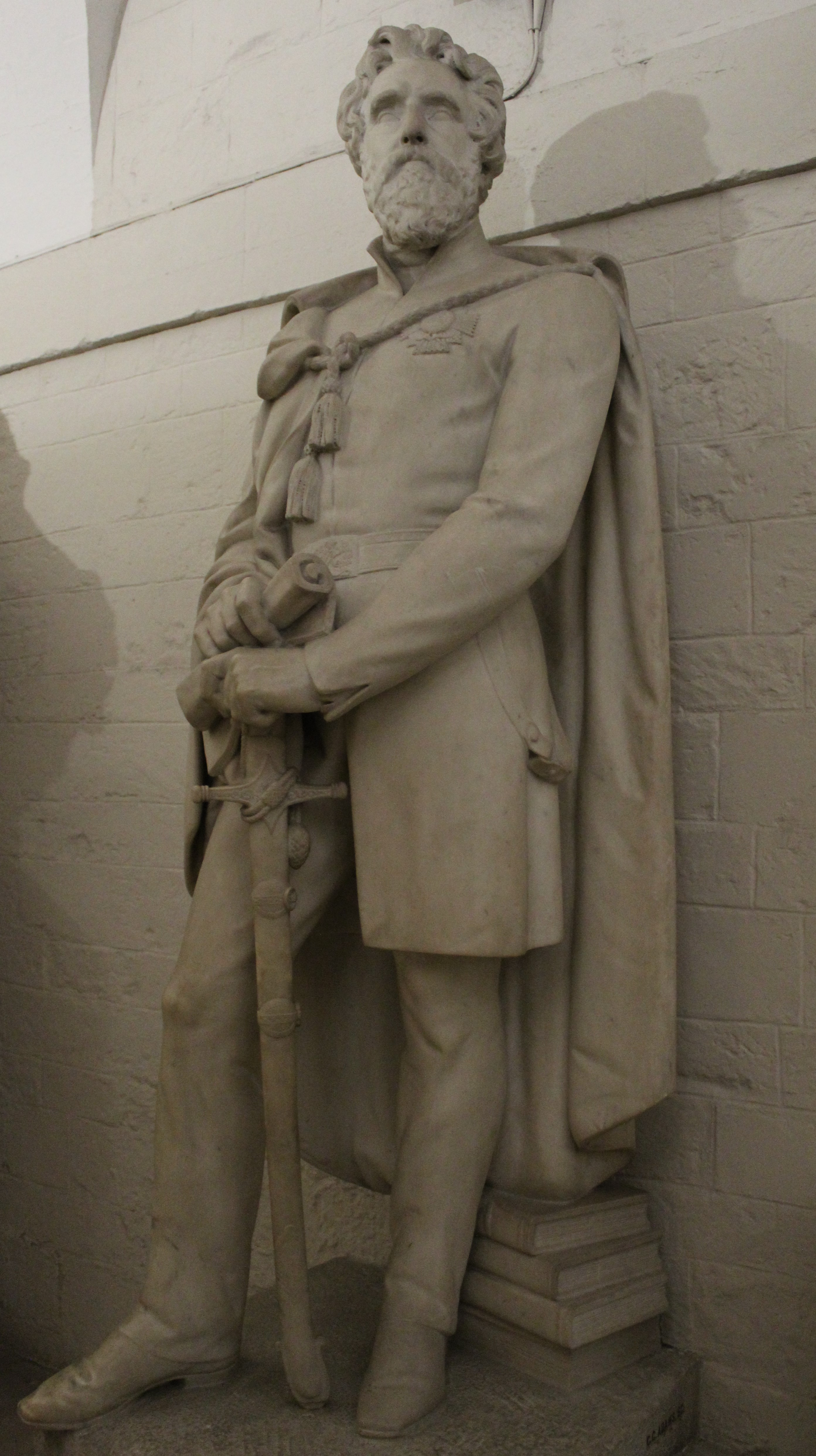
Statue of Napier at St Paul's Cathedral by George Gammon Adams

While in France he improved his general education, and his post-army career was in literature, not art. He wrote a review of Jomini's works (Edinburgh Review) in 1821, and in 1823 Henry Bickersteth suggested that he write a history of the Peninsular War. As an author he wished to defend the memory of Sir John Moore, and to prevent his old chief being overshadowed by that of Wellington. The Duke of Wellington himself gave him much assistance, and handed over the whole of Joseph Bonaparte's correspondence captured at the Battle of Vitoria; this was all in cipher, but Mrs Napier discovered the key. Soult took an active interest in the work arranging for a French translation of Mathieu Dumas. The first volume of his History of the War in the Peninsula was published in 1828. The publisher John Murray was disappointed by the sales of the first volume so Napier published the remaining five volumes himself. These proved successful, and when in 1840 the last volume of the History was published, his reputation not only in England but in France and Germany was well established.

His life during these years had been chiefly absorbed in his History, but he sympathized with the movement for political reform in England. 'The Radicals' of Bath, (forerunners of Chartism), among many other cities and towns pressed him to enter parliament. Napier's friends actually invited to become the military chief of a national guard to obtain reforms by force of arms, which he refused on the ground that he was in bad health and had a family of eight children. In 1830 he had been promoted Colonel, and by 1841 he attained the rank of Major-General and was appointed Lieutenant Governor of Guernsey. On Guernsey he was engaged in controlling relations between soldiers and the inhabitants. He was working on proposals for a complete scheme of reform in the government of the island, upsetting many people in the process, when his tenure came to an end.

While he was at Guernsey his brother Charles had conquered Sindh, and the attacks made on the policy of that conquest led to William Napier again to write. In 1845 he published his The Conquest of Scinde, and in 1851 the corresponding History of the Administration of Scinde. In 1847 he resigned his governorship, and in 1848 was made a Knight Commander of the Bath and settled at Scinde House, Clapham Park. In 1848 he was given the colonelcy of the 27th (Inniskilling) Regiment of Foot which he held until 1853, when he transferred to succeed his brother Charles as colonel of the 22nd (Cheshire) Regiment of Foot. In 1851 he was promoted Lieutenant-General. His time was fully occupied in defending his brother, in revising the numerous editions of his History and in writing letters to The Times on military and literary subjects. He never fully recovered from the effects of the wound received at Cazal Nova, and often lay on his back for months to assuage.

William's domestic life was overshadowed by an incurable illness of his only son. When his brother Charles died in 1853 he wrote a life for his brother, which appeared in 1857. At the end of 1853 his younger brother, Captain Henry Napier RN., died and, in 1855, his brother Sir George. He lived until the year 1860, when, suffering ill health, he died at Clapham, and was buried at West Norwood. Four months earlier he had been promoted to the full rank of general. There is a memorial to him in St Paul's Cathedral.

== Works ==
The Encyclopædia Britannica Eleventh Edition considered his military history, at the time, to be "incomparably superior to any other English writer", comparing him to three other soldier-writers: Thucydides, Julius Caesar and Enrico Caterino Davila. Among his works are:

- History of the War in the Peninsula and the South of France from the Year 1807 to the Year 1814 (6 vols.) (1828–40)
- The Conquest of Scinde (1845)
- History of General Sir Charles Napier's Administration of Scinde, and Campaign in the Cutchee Hills (1851)
- The life and opinions of General Sir Charles James Napier, (4 vols.) (1857)

== See also ==
- Father – Colonel George Napier (1751–1804)
- Mother – Lady Sarah Lennox (1745–1826), daughter of Charles Lennox, 2nd Duke of Richmond
- Brother – Sir Charles James Napier (1782–1853), Commander-in-Chief, India. The city of Napier, New Zealand is named after him.
- Brother – Sir George Thomas Napier (1784–1855), Commander–in–Chief of the Army in the Cape Colony
- Brother – Henry Edward Napier (1789–1853), naval officer and historian
- Grandson – Philip Napier Miles (1865–1935), philanthropist and composer

Government offices
Preceded by Sir James Douglas	Lieutenant Governor of Guernsey; 1842–1848	Succeeded by Sir John Bell
Military offices
Preceded by Sir Charles James Napier	Colonel of the 22nd (The Cheshire) Regiment of Foot; 1853–1860	Succeeded by Sir John Lysaght Pennefather
Preceded by Sir John Maclean	Colonel of the 27th (Inniskilling) Regiment of Foot; 1848–1853	Succeeded by Edward Fleming
