= George Napier =

British Army officer (1751–1804)

Colonel The Honourable George Napier
- Born: 11 March 1751
- Died: 12 October 1804 (aged 53)
- Spouses: Elizabeth Pollock (m. 1775; died 1778) Lady Sarah Lennox (m. 1781)
- Children: 6, including: Sir Charles James Napier; Sir George Thomas Napier; Sir William Francis Patrick Napier; Henry Edward Napier
- Relatives: Francis Napier, 6th Lord Napier (father)
- Military career
- Allegiance: Kingdom of Great Britain
- Branch: British Army
- Service years: 1767–1804
- Rank: Colonel
- Conflicts: American War of Independence

Colonel George Napier (11 March 1751 – 13 October 1804), styled "The Honourable", was a British Army officer, most notable for his marriage to Lady Sarah Lennox, and for his sons Charles James Napier, William Francis Patrick Napier and George Thomas Napier, all of whom were noted military officers, collectively referred to as "Wellington’s Colonels". He also served as Comptroller of Army Accounts in Ireland from 1799 until his death in 1804.

== Birth ==
George Napier was the younger son of Francis Napier, 6th Lord Napier and his wife Henrietta Maria Johnston.

== Military service ==
Napier was commissioned into the 25th Foot in 1767 and was promoted lieutenant in 1771. He became the regiment's Quartermaster in 1776. In 1778 he transferred to the 80th Regiment of Foot (Royal Edinburgh Volunteers) as a captain. He served in the American War of Independence on the staff of Sir Henry Clinton. He sold his commission in 1781, but was commissioned into the 1st Foot Guards in 1782. In 1783 he transferred to the 100th Regiment of Foot (Loyal Lincolnshire Regiment) as a captain. In 1794 he was promoted major, transferred to the 87th Foot, and then transferred again to the newly raised Londonderry Regiment as lieutenant-colonel. In 1800 he was promoted colonel.

== Marriages ==
On 22 January 1775 he married Elizabeth Pollock (died 1779), and together they had two daughters, Louisa Mary Napier (died 1856) Sarah Elizabeth, 6 May 1777 – 1779 and two sons,George Cranston Napier born 1778, d 1779 and Francis Napier, b. Sept 1779,d 1779. While he was in the West Indies (either St Lucia or Martinique) he and his wife and children all fell dangerously ill. He was mortally ill. His brother officers decided to sell his commission, so that if his wife and children survived, they would have money to live on. Unfortunately, it was his wife and their two sons and one daughter who died, he survived along with one daughter. That is why, at the time of his second marriage, he is described as "impoverished".

On 27 August 1781 he married Lady Sarah Lennox, daughter of Charles Lennox, 2nd Duke of Richmond. He was described at the time as being “impoverished”. Her previous marriage had ended in scandal and divorce; George was Sarah's second husband, Sarah was George's second wife. Together they raised eight children, including three who were to become famed military officers:

- General Sir Charles James Napier GCB (10 August 1782 – 1853)
- Emily Louisa Augusta Napier (1783 – 1863), married Sir Henry Bunbury, 7th Baronet
- Lieutenant-General Sir George Thomas Napier KCB (1784 – 1855)
- Lieutenant-General Sir William Francis Patrick Napier KCB (17 December 1785 – 12 February 1860)
- Richard Napier (1787 – 1868) married Anna Louisa Stewart, daughter of Sir J. Stewart.
- Captain Henry Edward Napier RN (5 March 1789 – 13 October 1853)
- Caroline Napier (1790 - 1810)
- Cecilia Napier (1791 - 1808)

In 1785 he moved his family to Celbridge in County Kildare, Ireland, where George eventually earned a post as Comptroller of Army Accounts. Lady Sarah was the sister of the very wealthy Lady Louisa Conolly and Emily FitzGerald, Duchess of Leinster who lived nearby. During the Irish Rebellion of 1798, in which one of the rebel leaders was his nephew Lord Edward FitzGerald, he is said to have armed his five sons, put his house in a state of defence, and offered an asylum to all who were willing to resist the insurgents.

== Trivia ==
In 1999, a 6-part miniseries called Aristocrats, based on the lives of Sarah Lennox and her sisters, aired in the U.K. George Napier appears at various ages in the series, played by Martin Glyn Murray and Jeremy Bulloch.

It is incorrectly stated that George Napier's grandson, Colonel Napier, brought the first pair of skis to Davos in 1888, starting the popular sport of Alpine skiing that had formerly been the activity of a few experts. The actual "Colonel Napier" who was responsible for the growth of Alpine skiing was the son of Robert Napier, 1st Baron Napier of Magdala
