= Lady Louisa Conolly =

English-born Irish noblewoman (1743–1821)

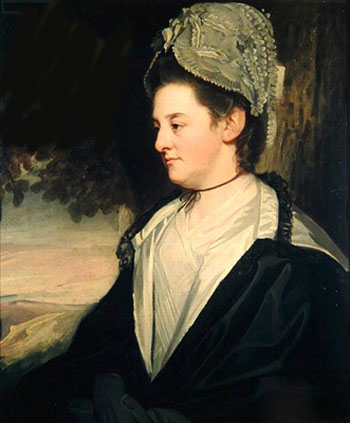
- Lady Louisa Conolly, by George Romney, 1776.
- Born: Lady Louisa Augusta Lennox; 5 December 1743
- Died: August 1821 (aged 77–78)
- Resting place: Tea Lane Graveyard, Celbridge
- Known for: Lennox sisters
- Spouse: Thomas Conolly (m. 1758; died 1803)
- Parent(s): Charles Lennox, 2nd Duke of Richmond; Sarah Cadogan

Lady Louisa Conolly (5 December 1743 – August 1821) was an English noblewoman. She was the third of the famous Lennox Sisters, and was notable among them for leading a wholly uncontroversial life filled with good works.

== Biography ==
Born Lady Louisa Augusta Lennox, she was the third of the four Lennox sisters portrayed in Stella Tillyard's book Aristocrats: Caroline, Emily, Louisa, and Sarah Lennox and in the BBC television series based on it. The Lennox sisters were the daughters of Charles Lennox, 2nd Duke of Richmond, and Lady Sarah Cadogan. The 2nd duke's father, the first duke, was an illegitimate son of King Charles II of England.

Louisa was still a child when her parents died within a year of each other in 1750 and 1751. After this, Lady Louisa was brought up by her much older sister Emily FitzGerald, Duchess of Leinster, in Kildare. In 1758, aged 15, she married Thomas Conolly (1738–1803), grand-nephew of William Conolly, Speaker of the Irish House of Commons. Her husband, a wealthy land-owner and keen horseman, was also a successful politician who was elected to Parliament as early as 1759. The couple lived in the Palladian mansion Castletown House in County Kildare, the decoration of which she directed throughout the 1760s and 1770s. The Conolly summer residence 'Cliff House' on the banks of the River Erne between Belleek, County Fermanagh and Ballyshannon, County Donegal was demolished as part of the Erne Hydroelectric scheme, which constructed the Cliff and Cathaleen's Fall hydroelectric power stations. Cliff hydroelectric power station was constructed on the site of 'Cliff House' and was commissioned in 1950.

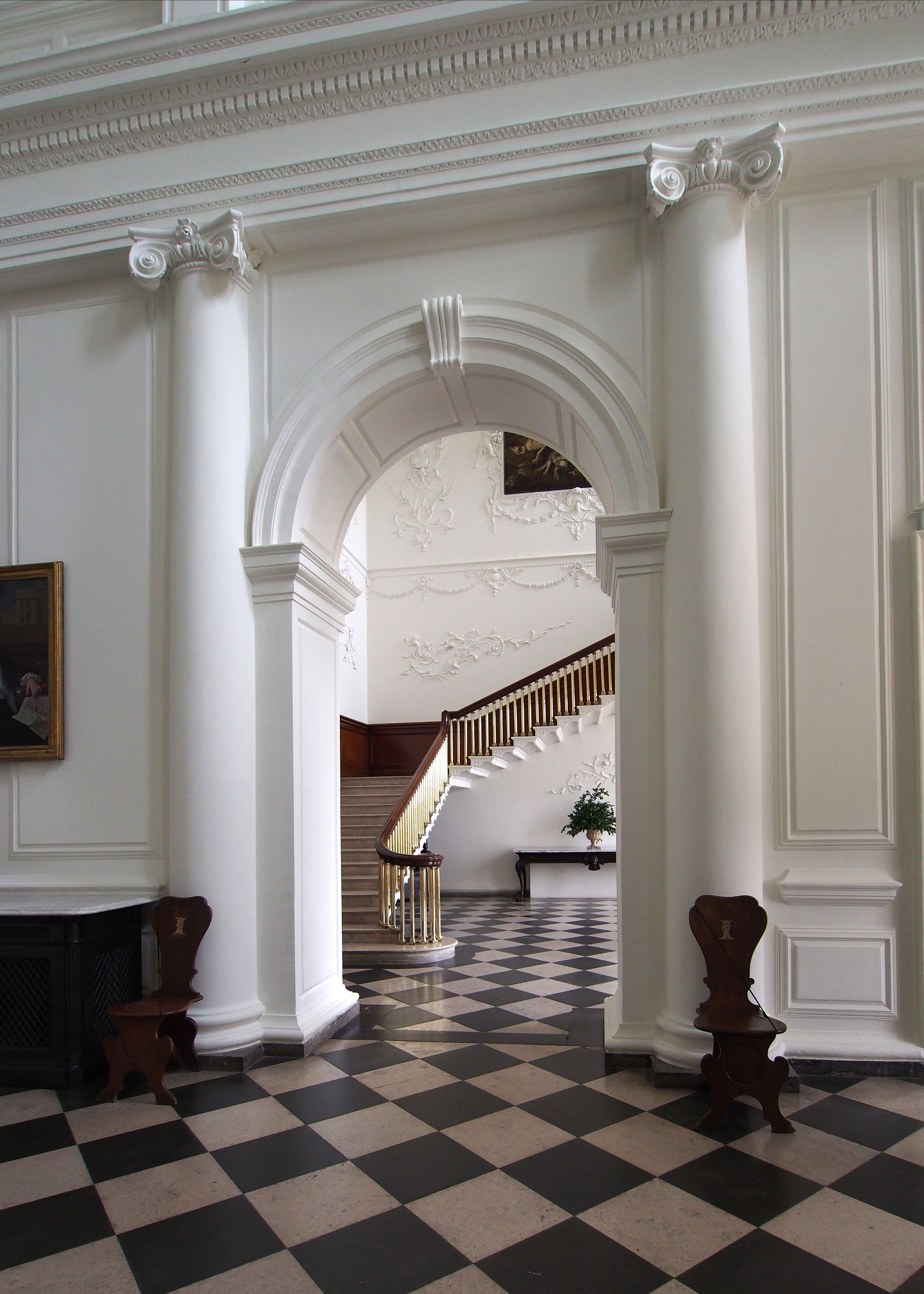
The interior entrance hall at Castletown House in County Kildare

Themselves unhappily childless, at that point they took up the welfare of young children from disadvantaged backgrounds as a lifelong project, contributing both money and effort towards initiatives which would enable foundlings and vagabonds to acquire productive skills and support themselves. They developed one of the first Industrial Schools where boys learnt trades, and Lady Louisa took active personal interest in mentoring the students. In middle age, Lady Louisa also virtually adopted her niece Emily Napier (1783–1863), the daughter of her sister Lady Sarah Lennox. Emily, who would spend long months with her aunt in Kildare, married Sir Henry Bunbury, 7th Baronet, and moved to Suffolk, although she remained close to her aunt until her death.

Thomas Conolly died in 1803. Upon his death, the major part of his estates, which included Wentworth Castle, passed to a distant relative, Frederick Vernon. Lady Louisa received the Castletown House and estate, as also certain liquid investments and valuable urban properties, which enabled her to live in comfort and continue her activities until her own death in 1821. She willed these substantial properties to a great-nephew, Edward Michael Pakenham (grandson of Thomas' sister Harriet), later the MP for County Donegal,

== In media ==
The 1769 travelogue "Hibernia Curiosa: A Letter from a Gentleman in Dublin to his Friend at Dover in Kent..." by John Bush was dedicated to Conolly. The dedication reads:

"To the Right Honourable the Lady Louisa Conolly. The following Strictures of a Civil and Natural History of Ireland, Are most humbly inscribed By Her Ladyship's Most respectful, And most obedient, Humble servant, J. Bush"

She was portrayed by Anne-Marie Duff in Aristocrats, a 1999 6-part miniseries based on the lives of Louisa Lennox and her sisters, aired in the U.K. on BBC and on the PBS anthology series Masterpiece Theater in the USA. It was based on Stella Tillyard's 1994 biography, Aristocrats: Caroline, Emily, Louisa and Sarah Lennox 1740-1832.

== Sources ==
- Bush, John (1769). Hibernia Curiosa: A Letter from a Gentleman in Dublin to his Friend at Dover in Kent, Giving a general View of the Manners, Customs, Dispositions, &c. of the Inhabitants of Ireland. With occasional Observations on the State of Trade and Agriculture in that Kingdom. And including an Account of some of its most remark-able Natural Curiosities, such as Salmon-Leaps, Water-Falls, Cascades, Glynns, Lakes, &c With a more particular Description of the Giant's Cause-way in the North; and of the celebrated Lake of Killarney in the South of Ireland; taken from an attentive Survey and Examination of the Originals. Collected in a Tour Through the Kingdom in the Year 1764 And ornamented with Plans of the principal Originals, engraved from Drawings taken on the Spot. London: London (Printed for W. Flexney, opposite Gray's-Inn-Gate, Holbourn); Dublin (J. Potts and J. Williams).
