= The Man of Pleasure's Pocket Book =

1780s notebook with articles

The Man of Pleasure's Pocket-Book is a pocket-sized memorandum book which includes etiquette advice and a guide to leisure activities in London. Two "annual" editions were published in 1780 and 1781. Modern historians refer to it for its evidence of men's sexual culture in Georgian England, exemplified by its ranking of notable women by their attractiveness and its notes on the availability of prostitutes.

== Contents ==
Annual pocket-books were a form of combined journal and periodical publication, which began appearing in England in the 1730s and were widely popular by the 1750s. They provided blank spaces for note-taking, storage pockets for personal items, and articles on entertaining or useful subjects. They were carried as a mobile reference text for daily life, supplanting the almanac as the go-to personal calendar. The Man of Pleasure's Pocket-Book is bound in red sheepskin leather, with pockets in the cover for users to store paper ephemera or money. The frontispiece features an engraving (illustrating fashionable dress in 1780, and the Royal Academy Exhibition of 1780 in 1781). The first section provides fifty-two lined pages intended for the owner to take notes. These are described as including "the usual tables"; generally, pocket-books of this era included pre-labeled tables for recording social engagements and weekly expenses. Princeton University Library holds a copy of the Pocket-Book owned by a British land agent who filled it with the expenses of his customers, including those of the colonial administrator Thomas Pownall.

Following the blank section for note-taking, the book includes several articles about society life and leisure activities. The 1780 books contained eight articles: a list of "public Diversions" and the logistics of attending them; advice on the suitable clothes for specific occasions; a list of "the most elegant Amusements in Vogue"; advice on urban etiquette, for country gentlemen and students; tips for making pleasant conversation; a list of hotels; a ranking of notable women, described as an "annual Register of Toasts upon the haut, milieu, and petit Tons"; and a dictionary of modern slang. The 1781 pocket-book also included eight articles, but on slightly different topics: advice on fashion for the year; extracts of elegant writing in both French and English, "of the greatest Utility of Scholars who aim at writing French and English with Ease and Elegance"; a treatise on dancing, including a discussion of the new cotillion and "Minuet de la Cour"; an expanded list of "Diversions" in London; a list of public leisure facilities in Bath, Somerset; an exercise routine practiced by the Royal Guards; advice on etiquette for "a Man of Pleasure"; and a piece titled "Circuit of the Judges".

== Publication history ==
The full title of the book (with the year updated annually) is The Man of Pleasure's Pocket-Book: Or, The Bon Vivant's Vade Mecum, For The Year 1780. Being The Universal Companion in every Line of Taste, Gallantry, and Haut Ton. It was printed by S. Bladon, and its title page says it is by "a Member of the Club of Savoir-Vivres".

The pocket-book for the year 1780 was advertised for sale at the end of 1779 and the beginning of 1780, with the notice that it would be "continued annually". Its article on "The Art of Pleasing on Conversation" was also printed in the November 1779 issue of Town and Country Magazine. The next year's pocket-book was advertised in late 1780. The price of both was two shillings.

== Historical analysis ==
Historians have noted the book for the details it provides about men's sexuality at the time. The 1780 hotel guide includes information about the availability of prostitutes, and the discussion of available entertainments in London also includes suggestions for brothels in Covent Garden. The "Scale of Beauty" also expresses the cultural norms of heterosexual gender performance by ranking notable women by their "Beauty, Grace, and Elegance", each scored out of fifty. Ranked lists of attractive women occasionally appeared in newspapers at the time, asserting specific qualities that men desired in women. As in these newspaper lists, the Pocket-Book gives its highest score to Georgiana Cavendish, Duchess of Devonshire. The scale then descends by rank through nobility, actresses, and courtesans. According to the historian Jianna Jarvis, all of these women "could be perceived as enjoying a measure of autonomy in their lives", while publicly evaluating them based on their attractiveness to men "fixed them in an acceptable female role, as the decorative adornment to a man's life."

The Pocket-Book also serves as an expression of hierarchical social rank, as in its explanations of the specific forms of expensive, elite dress required for particular activities. It identifies the opera as the most well-esteemed form of public entertainment, followed by theatres, pleasure gardens, private clubs, and assemblies. These operas were typically performed at the King's Theatre, close to the elite gathering-places of St. James' Court and White's and Almack's social clubs, and far from the commercial activity (including prostitution) which was near the theatres of Covent Garden and Drury Lane.
