= George Thomas Napier =

British Army general (1784–1855)

Lieutenant-General Sir George Thomas Napier KCB
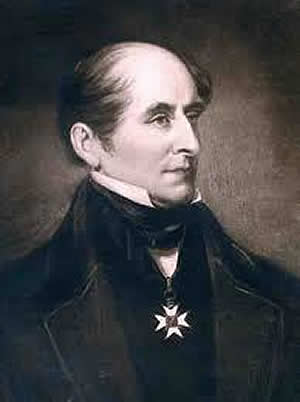
- Born: George Thomas Napier; 30 June 1784
- Died: 16 September 1855 (aged 71); Geneva, Switzerland
- Military career
- Allegiance: United Kingdom
- Branch: British Army
- Rank: Lieutenant-General
- Wars: Peninsular War

Sir George Thomas Napier KCB (30 June 1784 – 16 September 1855) was a British Army officer who saw service in the Peninsular War and later commanded the army of the Cape Colony.

== Life ==
He entered the British Army in 1800, and served with distinction under Sir John Moore and the Duke of Wellington in the Peninsula—losing his right arm at the 1812 storming of Ciudad Rodrigo, where, as a major in the 52nd Foot, he led the Light Division's storming party.

He became major-general in 1837, KCB in 1838 and lieutenant-general in 1846. He was governor and Commander-In-Chief of the army in the Cape Colony from 1839 to 1843, during which time the abolition of slavery and the expulsion of the Boers from Natal were the chief events. He was offered, but declined, the chief command in India after the Battle of Chillianwalla, and also that of the Sardinian army in 1849. He became full general in 1854. He died at Geneva, Switzerland on 16 September 1855, aged 71.

His autobiography, Passages in the Early Military Life of General Sir G.T. Napier, was published by his surviving son, General William Craig Emilius Napier (the author of an important work on outpost duty) in 1885.

The town of Napier, Western Cape, and also Napier House at Fairbairn College, Goodwood, Cape Town, are named after Sir George Thomas Napier.

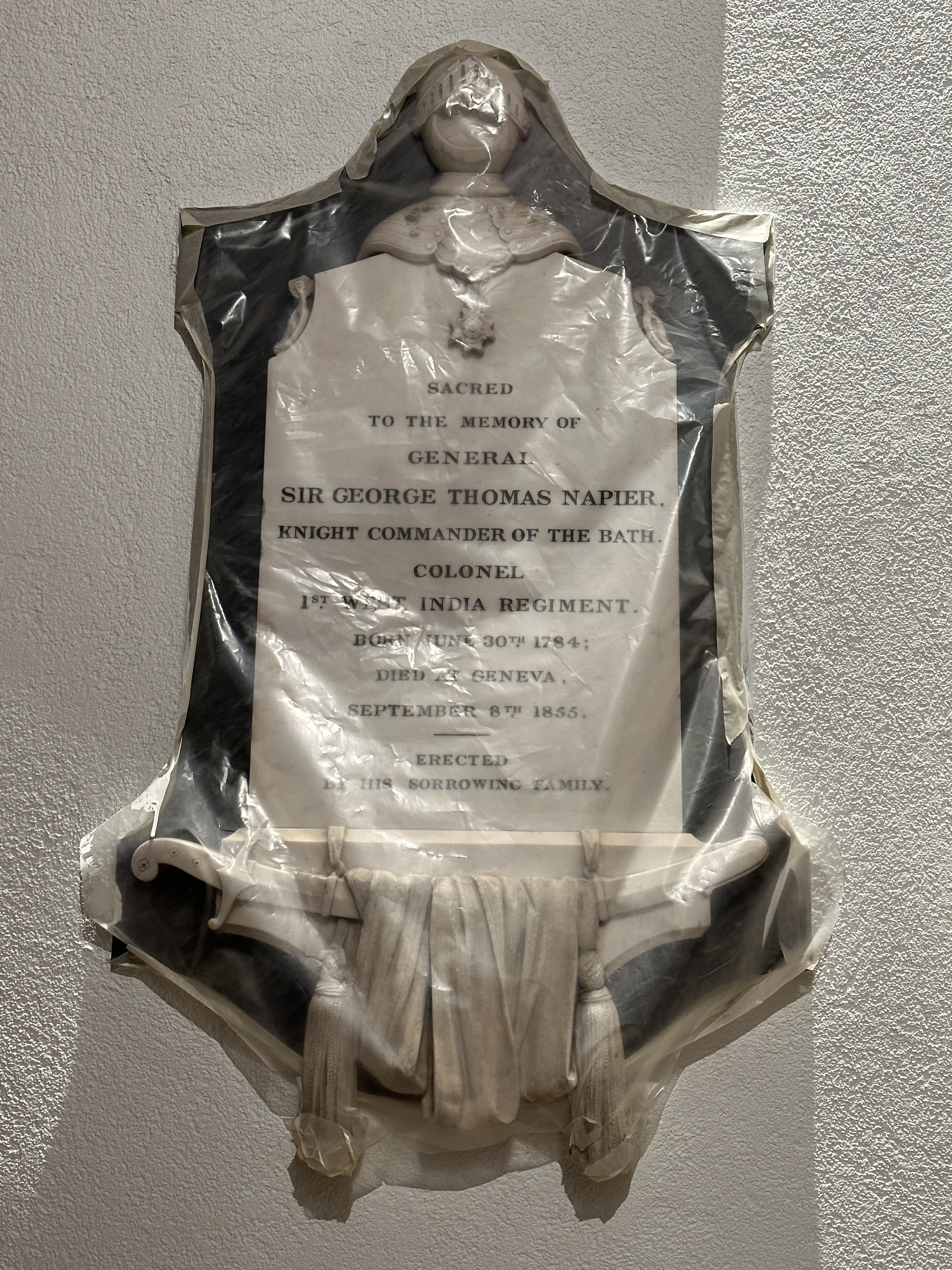
Memorial plaque of George Thomas Napier in Holy Trinity Church, Geneva

== Family ==
- Father - Colonel George Napier (1751–1804)
- Mother - Lady Sarah Lennox (1745–1826), daughter of Charles Lennox, 2nd Duke of Richmond.
- Brother - Sir Charles James Napier (1782–1853), Commander-in-Chief in India. The New Zealand city of Napier is named after him.
- Brother - Sir William Francis Patrick Napier (1785–1860), soldier and military historian.
- Brother - Henry Edward Napier (1789–1853), naval officer and historian
- Wife - Frances Dorothea Blencowe, formerly married to William Peere Williams Freeman.
- Son-in-law - Colonel Henry William St Pierre Bunbury (1812–1875), married his daughter Cecilia
- Lieut. Colonel George S. F. Napier (c. 1862–1942)

Government offices
Preceded by Benjamin d'Urban	Governor of the Cape Colony; 1838–1844	Succeeded by Sir Peregrine Maitland
