= Aristocrats (TV series) =

Television series

- Genre: Drama
- Based on: Biography by Stella Tillyard
- Screenplay by: Harriet O'Carroll
- Directed by: David Caffrey
- Composer: Mark Thomas
- Countries of origin: United Kingdom; United States; Ireland
- Original language: English
- No. of series: 1
- No. of episodes: 6

Production
- Executive producers: Kevin Menton; Rod Stoneman; Rebecca Eaton; Michael Wearing
- Production locations: Maynooth, County Kildare, Ireland
- Editor: Neil Thomson
- Running time: 300 min. (6 episodes)

Original release
- Network: BBC One
- Release: 20 June – 25 July 1999

Aristocrats is a 1999 six-part television series based on the biography by Stella Tillyard of the four aristocratic Lennox sisters in 18th century England. The series consists of six episodes of 50 minutes each and was first broadcast in the United Kingdom on BBC, starting on 20 June 1999. It was a co-production between the United Kingdom, the United States, and Ireland.

Carton House in County Kildare in Ireland was a major location. This is where two of the sisters had been brought up by another sister after the death of their father.

== Episodes ==
- Episode 1 - broadcast 20 June 1999
- Episode 2 - broadcast 27 June 1999
- Episode 3 - broadcast 4 July 1999
- Episode 4 - broadcast 11 July 1999
- Episode 5 - broadcast 18 July 1999
- Episode 6 - broadcast 25 July 1999

== Cast ==
Character	Played by
Lady Caroline Lennox	Serena Gordon
Lady Louisa Lennox	Anne-Marie Duff
Lady Emily Lennox	Geraldine Somerville
Narrator / Older Lady Emily Lennox	Siân Phillips
Lady Sarah Lennox	Jodhi May
Lord Holland	Alun Armstrong
Lord Kildare	Ben Daniels
Duke of Richmond	Julian Fellowes
Duchess of Richmond	Diane Fletcher
Thomas Conolly	Paul Ridley Tom Mullion
Sir Charles Bunbury, Bt	Andrew Havill
William Ogilvie	George Anton
Lord Edward FitzGerald	John Light
King George II	Clive Swift
Lord Beaufield	Richard Dempsey
Little Eddie	Eoin O'Driscoll
Young Charles James Fox	Fearghal Geraghty

== Awards ==
The series was nominated in 1999 for two Awards by the Irish Film and Television Awards for "Best Craft Contribution," and "Best Television Drama." It also was nominated for two awards by the Royal Television Society, including " Best Costume Design," and "Best Make Up."

== DVD release ==
All six parts of the miniseries were released in a DVD boxset on 8 August 2006. The set includes three discs containing all the episodes.
