= Stella Tillyard =

British author and historian, born 1957

- Born: 1957 (age 68–69)
- Education: University of Oxford; Harvard University; School of the Museum of Fine Arts at Tufts
- Occupations: Author, historian, professor

Stella Tillyard FRSL (born 1957) is a British author and historian.

== Education and career ==
She was educated at Oxford and Harvard Universities and the School of the Museum of Fine Arts at Tufts. In 1999 her bestselling book Aristocrats was made into a six-part series for BBC1/Masterpiece Theatre sold to over 20 countries. Winner of the Meilleur Livre Étranger, the Longman/History Today Prize and the Fawcett Prize, she has taught at Harvard; the University of California, Los Angeles; Birkbeck, London and the Centre for Editing Lives and Letters at Queen Mary, London. She is a visiting professor in the Department of History, Classics and Archaeology, Birkbeck, University of London, and a Fellow of the Royal Society of Literature.

== Personal life ==
Tillyard moved to the United States in 1981 and has lived for long periods in Boston, Los Angeles, Chicago and Florence. In 2006 she moved to London. She campaigned for Britain to remain in the EU. She divides her time between London and Italy. She has two children.

== Books ==
- 2024: (as translator), In Defense of Don Giovanni: A Feminist Mythobiography, by Luisa Passerini, Punctum Books, California
- 2019: George IV: King in Waiting, Allen Lane, an imprint of Penguin Books, London
- 2018: The Great Level, Chatto & Windus, London; published in 2019 as Call Upon the Water, Atria Books, New York
- 2011: Tides of War. A Novel of the Peninsular War, Chatto & Windus, London. Danish translation available
- 2006: A Royal Affair: George III and His Troublesome Siblings, Chatto & Windus, London; also published as A Royal Affair: George III and his Scandalous Siblings, Random House, New York. Swedish translation available
- 1999: Aristocrats: The Illustrated Companion, Weidenfeld & Nicolson, London
- 1997: Citizen Lord: Edward Fitzgerald 1763-1798, Chatto & Windus, London. published in 1998 as Citizen Lord: The Life of Edward Fitzgerald, Irish Revolutionary, Farrar, Straus & Giroux, New York; Russian, Hungarian and Brazilian translations in preparation
- 1994: Aristocrats: Caroline, Emily, Louisa and Sarah Lennox 1740-1832, Chatto & Windus, London. Reprinted by the Folio Society, 2008, with a new introduction. Translations into Danish, Dutch, French, German, Italian, Portuguese and Swedish
- 1987: The Impact of Modernism, 1900-1920: The Visual Arts in Edwardian England , Routledge, London

== Professional activities ==
- 2019: Fellow of the Royal Society of Literature
- 2016: Visiting Professor, Birkbeck, University of London
- 2016: Judge, Sunday Times Young Writer of the Year
- 2013: Judge, Hesell-Tiltman History Prize for English PEN
- 2010: Judge, Samuel Johnson Prize
- 2010-14: Judge, Prison Reform Trust writing competition
- 2009: Writer in Residence, Farmleigh, Dublin
- 2006-11: Senior Research Fellow, AHRB Centre for Editing Lives and Letters, Queen Mary, University of London
- 2002: Judge, Whitbread Prize
- 1999-2000/2005-6: Columnist, Prospect magazine

== Prizes and awards ==
- 2012: Orange Prize long list, Tides of War
- 1999: Meilleur Livre Etranger, Aristocrats
- 1997: Whitbread Prize biography short list, Citizen Lord
- 1995: Fawcett Prize, Aristocrats
- 1994: Longman/History Today Book of the Year Award, Aristocrats
- 1988: Nicholas Pevsner Prize
- 1981-2: Knox Fellowship, Harvard University
- 1979-81: Domus Student, Linacre College, Oxford

== Film and television ==
- 2012: "A Royal Affair", Denmark 2012
- 2009: Deutsches Radio TV documentary, "A Royal Affair"
- 2008: "Library Late", National Library, Dublin
- 2000: "The Making of Aristocrats". One-hour documentary interview. BBC Education
- 1999: Aristocrats BBC/WGBH 6 part Co-Production with Screen Ireland, for BBC1 and Masterpiece Theatre

== Radio ==
- 2019: BBC Radio4, A Point of View:
  1. "The Sea is Back"
  2. "Peak Stuff"
- 2018: BBC Radio 4, A Point of View:
  1. "Speak, History!"
  2. "Cities of the Dead"
  3. "A Problem with Words"
  4. "The Museum of Deportation"
- 2017: BBC Radio 4, A Point of View: "The Screensaver of Life, or the Idling Brain"
- 2014: BBC Radio 4 on the Georgians
- 2012: Woman's Hour, Radio 4, "Female Academicians"
- 2012: Today, Radio 4, "The History of Fame and Celebrity"
- 2011: BBC Radio 3, "Private Passions"

== Recent articles and introductions ==
- 2014: Introduction, Jan Morris, The Venetian Empire
- 2014: "The Creaking of the Scenery", Writing Historical Fiction: The Writers & Artists Companion
- 2012: Introduction, Nancy Mitford, The Sun King
- 2008: "Biography and Modernity: some thoughts on origins", Writing Lives, Biography and Textuality, Identity and Representation in Early Modern England
- 2006: Introduction, James Boswell, London Journal
- 2006: "All our Pasts", TLS, October 2006. Reprinted in The Author, Spring 2007.
- 2006: "David Malouf", Prospect
- 2005: "Alan Hollinghurst", Prospect

== Catalogue essays ==
- 2015: "Newfoundland", the work of Romilly Saumarez Smith, Edmund de Waal Studio; Sainsbury Centre, Norwich
- 2005: "Paths of Glory: Fame and the Public in Eighteenth Century London", Joshua Reynolds and the Creation of Celebrity, Tate Britain, London

== Recent talks ==
- 2019: "The Hanoverians: when Germans spoke French in St James's", Europe House, London
- 2017: "History and the Historical Novel", Warwick University
- 2017: "Female Celebrity, Feminism and Celebrity Culture", Oxford University
- 2016: "Opera and the Historical Novel", Royal Holloway, London
- 2015: "Tony Small; an African American in Ireland", Dublin Festival of History
- 2015: "Collecting the World; How Global Art came to Ireland in the Eighteenth Century", Art Institute of Chicago
- 2015: "Hollywood and the Eighteenth Century", ASECS Conference, Los Angeles
- 2015: "Two Irish Interiors", Northwestern University
- 2015: "Celebrity and the Plain Portrait in the Eighteenth Century", King's College, London, February
- 2014: "History and the Historical Novel", Warwick University, 14 January
