= 1726 English cricket season =

Cricket season review

During the 1726 English cricket season, a newspaper report named the players in a match, the first time this ever happened. The players concerned were Perry of London and Piper of Hampton, who played in what is the sport's earliest known single wicket match. In addition, brief reports of two eleven-a-side matches have survived. (Note: Any match listed in the ACS' Important Match Guide (1981) is historically important, and therefore of the highest standard, whether or not a scorecard might exist. The same applies to numerous matches discovered by researchers since 1981. For further information, see First-class cricket.) The main story of the year, as in some earlier seasons, concerns cricket's relationship with the law, and once again the issue was non-payment of gambling debts. County cricket was gaining in strength, and teams representing Kent and Surrey were prominent in 1726.

== Background ==
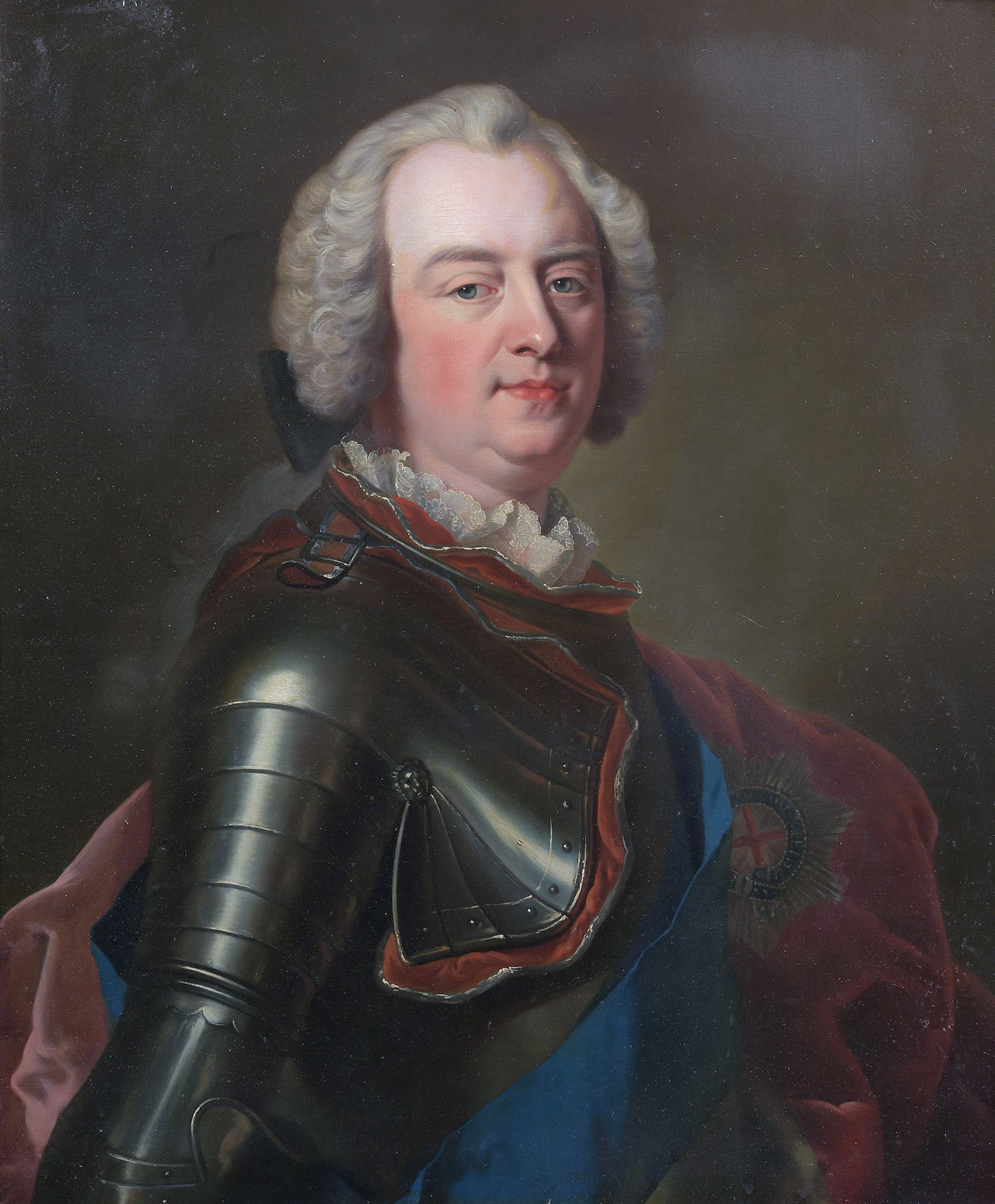
Charles Lennox, 2nd Duke of Richmond was one of cricket's main patrons in the 1720s.

By 1726, cricket had become an established sport in London and the south-eastern counties of England. It had also been played in India and North America by English colonists and sailors. The spread of cricket at home was limited by the constraints of travel at the time, but it was slowly gaining adherents in other parts of the country with references being found in counties outside the south-east, although it had apparently not reached the North of England yet.

Having been essentially a rural pastime for well over a century, cricket was becoming a focus for wealthy patrons such as the 2nd Duke of Richmond; and also for gamblers whose interests would fund its growth through the 18th century. Other famous patrons in the 1720s were Edwin Stead of Kent; Sir William Gage of Sussex; and Alan Brodrick of Surrey. Gambling was prevalent at cricket matches in the Georgian era, and many gambling – or alcohol-fuelled incidents occurred. The issue was not addressed by the sport's ruling body until the 1770s, and it remained a significant factor even then. The counterpart of that was the reliance of cricket, as a professional sport, upon the investment accrued through gambling interests.

== Media coverage ==
No cricket had been reported in the infant newspaper industry before 1697 due to the Licensing of the Press Act 1662, which controlled the press until 1696. Reports were beginning to increase by the mid-1720s, though it would be a very long time before coverage became anything like comprehensive.

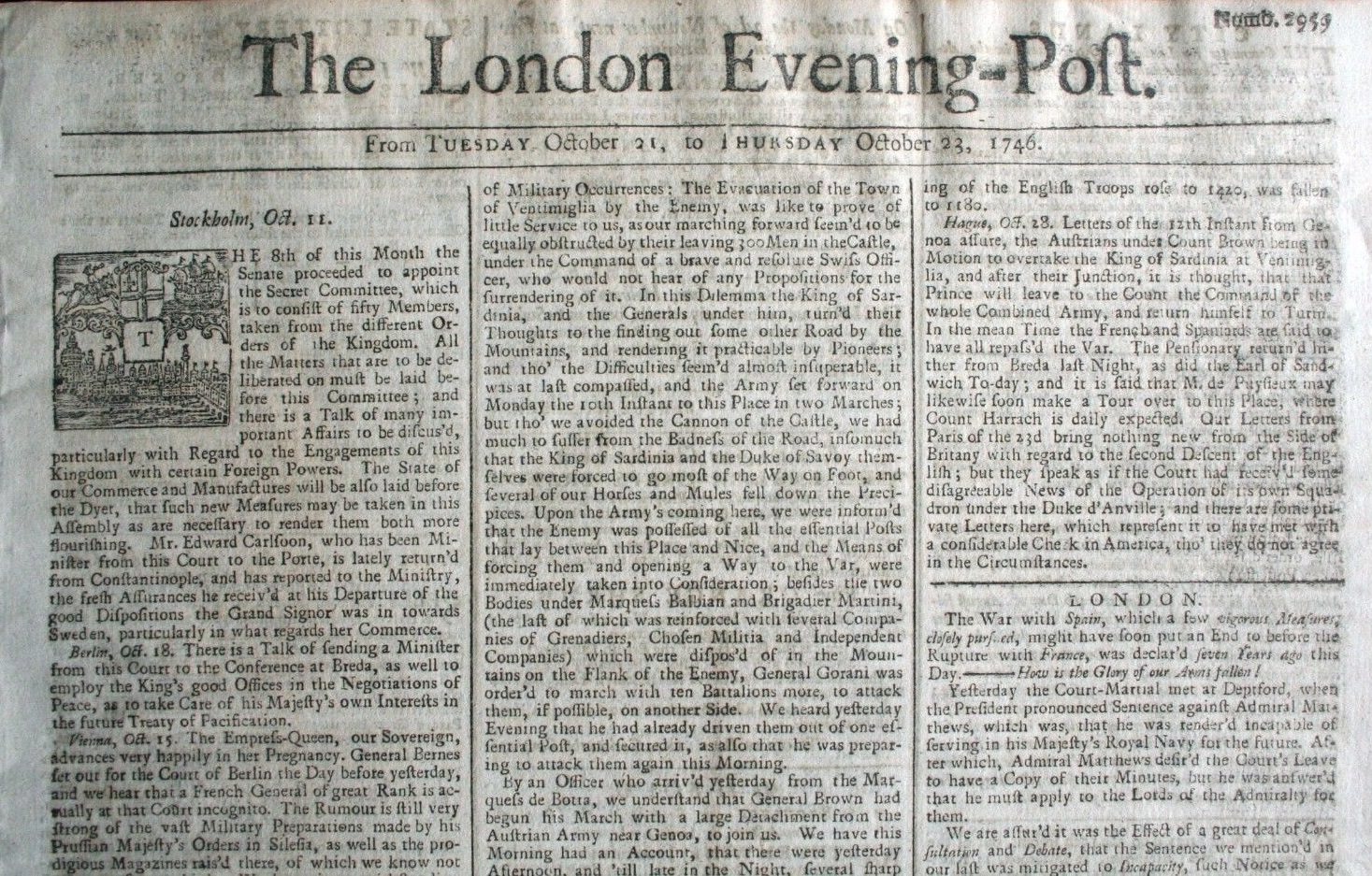
Front page of the London Evening Post in October 1746

The typical early report tended to be an advertisement for a scheduled match or else a brief discussion of the gambling odds, rather than the actual play, and it was not until 1726 that any player was mentioned by name in a newspaper report.

The London Evening Post was founded in 1726 and carried a good many cricket notices until it ceased publication in 1797. The growth of the newspaper industry was important contemporarily for giving the sport much needed publicity, and historically for providing glimpses into a developing sport that had still not learned how to record itself for posterity.

== Single wicket ==
It was the London Evening Post, in its issue dated Saturday, 27 August 1726, that carried an advertisement for a single wicket match between players called "the noted Perry" (of London) and "the famous Piper" (of Hampton), playing for twenty pounds each. The match was played at Moulsey Hurst, a multi-sport venue near Molesey in Surrey. This is the first time that players are known to have been named in a newspaper, and the match itself is the earliest known to have been played under single wicket rules. Moulsey Hurst was especially famous for prizefighting, but it was often used for cricket throughout the 18th century.

== County cricket ==
A feature of cricket in the 1720s was the increasing use by teams of county names. Teams called Kent and Surrey had been recorded as far back as 1709, though those may have been parish teams only. On 29 August 1726, a combined London & Surrey team hosted Stead's Kent on Kennington Common in a match classified as "important" by The Association of Cricket Statisticians and Historians (ACS). The brief newspaper report said it was played "for 25 guineas between the men belonging to Edwin Stead, Esq. of Maidstone and the men of London and Surrey". The result is unknown. Kent, based on the esteem of the Dartford club, and the successful patronage of Edwin Stead, is generally believed to have been the strongest county team in the 1720s.

== Controversies ==
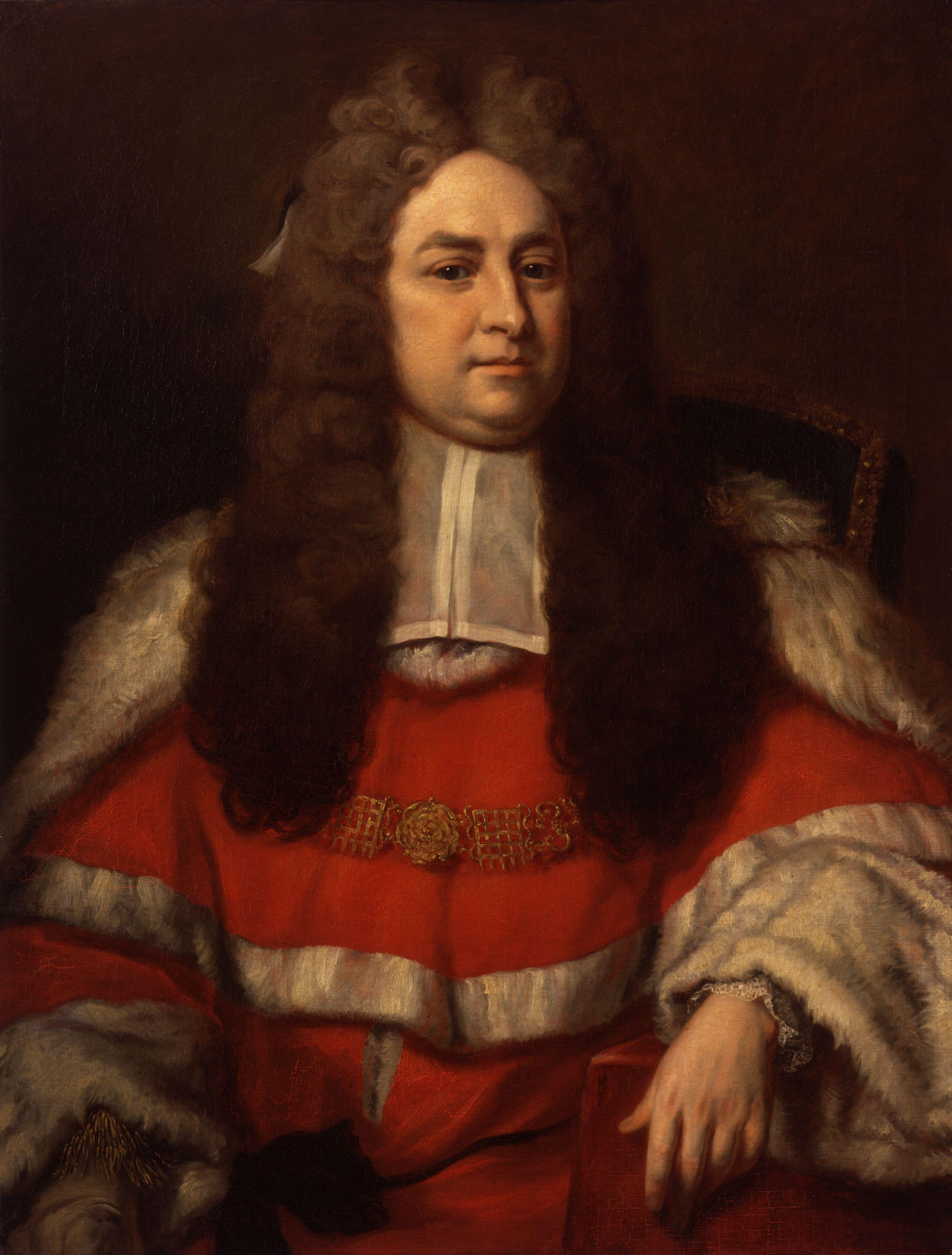
Lord Chief Justice Pratt, painted c.1710 by Michael Dahl.

Cricket encountered some legal issues in the first quarter of the 18th century, including two court cases about unpaid gambling debts. The second of these followed a match in 1724 between Edwin Stead's XI and a Chingford team. Terminating Stead's lawsuit, Lord Chief Justice Pratt ordered the match "to be played out" on Dartford Brent in order that the stakes could be settled, but he died in 1725 before it was played out. The replay took place in September 1726 but, again, the result is unknown.

In the same month and still on the subject of legal matters, a letter was written by a resident of Essex who complained that a local Justice of the Peace (JP) had seen fit to literally "read the Riot Act" to some people who were playing cricket on Saturday, 10 September. He had a constable with him who dispersed the players. G. B. Buckley commented that it seems the JP saw any game or sport as a pretence covering the gathering of disaffected people who intended to raise a rebellion. Given the ruling by Pratt, who had ordered the Stead v Chingford match to be played out on Dartford Brent, the issue raised by the letter-writer was that it was apparently lawful to play cricket in Kent, but not in Essex.

== Edmund Chapman ==
One Surrey player who could well have been involved in the game at Kennington was Edmund Chapman of Chertsey, who died on Wednesday, 30 July 1763, aged 68. Chapman was an eminent master bricklayer, and "accounted one of the most dextrous cricket players in England". There are no known references to Chapman earlier than his obituary notice but, given his age, he must have been an active player from the 1710s until perhaps the 1730s, presumably playing for Chertsey, and possibly for Surrey, as his county team.

== First mentions ==
=== Clubs and teams ===
- Hampton
- London & Surrey

=== Players ===
- Perry (London)
- Piper (Hampton)

== Bibliography ==
- ACS (1981). A Guide to Important Cricket Matches Played in the British Isles 1709–1863. Nottingham: ACS. OCLC 85045528.
- Altham, H. S.; Swanton, E. W. (1962). A History of Cricket, Volume 1 (to 1914) (5th ed.). London: George Allen & Unwin. OCLC 894274808.
- Birley, Derek (1999). A Social History of English Cricket. London: Aurum Press. ISBN 978-18-54107-10-7 – via Internet Archive.
- Bowen, Rowland (1970). Cricket: A History of its Growth and Development. London: Eyre & Spottiswoode. ISBN 978-04-13278-60-9.
- Buckley, G. B. (1935). Fresh Light on 18th Century Cricket. Birmingham: Cotterell & Co. OCLC 23450280.
- Buckley, G. B. (1937). Fresh Light on pre-Victorian Cricket. Birmingham: Cotterell & Co. OCLC 23469107.
- Byrd, William (1941). The Secret Diary of William Byrd of Westover, 1709-1712. Richmond, Virginia: Dietz Publishing. OCLC 1364677 – via Internet Archive.
- Haygarth, Arthur (1996) [1862]. Scores & Biographies, Volume 1 (1744–1826). Kennington: Frederick Lillywhite. ISBN 978-19-00592-23-9.
- Major, John (2007). More Than A Game. London: HarperCollins. ISBN 978-00-07183-64-7 – via Internet Archive.
- Malcolm, Dominic (2013). Globalizing Cricket. London: Bloomsbury Publishing. ISBN 978-18-49665-27-8 – via Internet Archive.
- Marshall, John (1961). The Duke Who Was Cricket. London: Frederick Muller Ltd. OCLC 11214571.
- Maun, Ian (2009). From Commons to Lord's, Volume One: 1700 to 1750. Cambridge: Roger Heavens. ISBN 978-19-00592-52-9.
- McCann, Tim (2004). Sussex Cricket in the Eighteenth Century (PDF). Vol. 88. Lewes: West Sussex Record Office. ISBN 978-08-54450-55-8.
- Underdown, David (2000). Start of Play. Westminster: Allen Lane. ISBN 978-07-13993-30-1 – via Internet Archive.
- Waghorn, H. T. (2005) [1906]. The Dawn of Cricket. London: J. W. McKenzie. ISBN 978-09-47821-17-3.
