= Professional and amateur status in first-class cricket =

English cricket player status

Professional and amateur status in first-class cricket was a long-standing distinction between participants who were paid – professionals – and those were not paid – amateurs. The divide was a large part of the cricketing landscape between the 1600s and 1962, when amateur status was abolished in England – the country where the system was most developed. Amateur cricketers tended to be drawn from the upper and middle classes and were generally only reimbursed for expenses, while professionals, largely drawn from people of working-class backgrounds were paid a salary by their clubs.

An annual Gentlemen v Players match was played between amateur and professional cricketers for over 150 years, with the final match occurring shortly before the abolition of amateur status. The divide presented itself in many ways, such as having separate dressing rooms, players having their names recorded differently on scorecards and the established convention that team captains be amateurs.

By the mid-twentieth century, the arrangement had come under attack, with widespread "shamateurism", where amateurs were being covertly paid. In 1962, the Marylebone Cricket Club (MCC) voted to end amateur status and from 1963, all first-class cricketers in England were officially regarded as professionals.

While amateur status has formally disappeared, many writers have continued to debate its legacy and how elements of the divide have continued to affect the modern game.

== Distinctions between amateur and professional status ==
On the face of it, the distinctions between amateurs and professionals in first-class cricket were their availability and their means of remuneration. The professional cricketer received a wage from his county club or, if he went on a tour, a contracted fee paid by the tour organiser. In both cases, there was the possibility of bonuses being earned. The amateur in theory received expenses only, again paid either by his county club or a tour organiser. Professionals were full-time players during the cricket season and would mostly seek alternative employment in the winter months. The amateur was not always a full-time player during the season and many played by choice as they typically had other means of income or support. Some amateurs, those in education being a common example, were part-time players of necessity as they could only commit to cricket during the school or university holidays (say, late July to mid-September). Those in other forms of employment relied for availability on occasional holidays or, in some cases, being given time off by their employers. There were employers who hired well-known cricketers for commercial prestige reasons and so were keen to see them take part in big matches.

In terms of cause and effect, however, availability and remuneration were effects only. The real distinction between amateur and professional, encapsulated by the Gentlemen v Players fixture which was first arranged by Lord Frederick Beauclerk in 1806 and played annually from 1829 to 1962, was social status within the English class structure. Amateurs (the Gentlemen) belonged to the upper and middle classes; professionals (the Players) invariably came from the working class. It was perceived that the amateur held a higher station in life and was therefore a class apart from the professional. The outlook of the two classes contrasted in that most of the amateurs played primarily for enjoyment, while most of the professionals took the game, as their living, very seriously indeed. Of underlying importance to the concept of amateurism were the schools, universities and other centres of education in which cricket was played, both as a curricular and extracurricular activity. The public schools (e.g., Eton, Harrow, Winchester) and the main universities (i.e., Oxford and Cambridge) produced most of the first-class amateur players and standards of amateur cricket rose during the 19th century through rivalry between the schools and then at university.

As early as the 17th century, there is evidence that sporting types among the well-to-do relished strong competition and welcomed the opportunity to play against the best performers, who tended to be working class and in time became the first professionals. Although the gentry were happy to play with and against the working class, they still retained a sense of social distinction and so, by the 19th century, the word "amateur" had taken on a peculiar meaning of its own in cricket terms that was redolent of social status and implied respectability. The amateurs insisted upon separate dressing rooms and, at some grounds, even a separate gateway onto the field. On scorecards, the amateur would be listed initials first and a professional teammate initials last: for example, P. B. H. May and Laker, J. C. In one notably laughable instance, when the professional Fred Titmus was walking out to bat, the public announcer stated that there was a mistake in the printed scorecards being sold at the ground: "F. J. Titmus should read Titmus, F. J."

The "Gentlemen and Players" distinction was a reflection of the higher status enjoyed by officers above other ranks in the British Army, and of employers above the workforce in commerce and industry. It therefore seemed natural to most 19th century English people, of all classes, to have a similar distinction in sport. This perception of amateurs as officers and gentlemen, and thereby leaders, meant that any team including an amateur would tend to appoint him as captain, even though most if not all of the professional players were more skilled technically. On occasion, as in the Yorkshire team of the 1920s, a ridiculous situation arose wherein the de facto captain was the senior professional (e.g., Wilfred Rhodes) and the nominal amateur captain "did what he was told". The idea of amateur captains only was applied to Test cricket from 1888. Some English touring teams to Australia until then had been all-professional, having been launched as private ventures, but England did not appoint another professional captain until Len Hutton in 1952 though, in the 1930s, Wally Hammond switched status from professional to amateur so that he could captain his country. Some of the amateur captains (e.g., W. G. Grace, Stanley Jackson, C. B. Fry and Peter May) were unquestionably worth their places in England's Test team on the grounds of their technical ability.

== Beginnings of amateurism (17th century) ==
The earliest definite mention of cricket is in a court case on Monday, 17 January 1597 (Julian date) in which John Derrick, a Queen's Coroner for the county of Surrey, and therefore a gentleman, bore written testimony as to a parcel of land in Guildford. Derrick, then aged 59, stated that when he was a schoolboy he and his friends had played cricket on the land (i.e., c.1550). Records from the early years of the 17th century show that cricket, having apparently been a children's game, was increasingly taken up by adults and the first clear indication that the gentry were involved (notwithstanding Derrick's own status) is in the record of an ecclesiastical court held in 1629. In this, Henry Cuffin, a curate at Ruckinge in Kent, was prosecuted by an Archdeacon's Court for playing cricket on a Sunday evening after prayers. He claimed that several of his fellow players were "persons of repute and fashion". For the next two centuries, the gentry saw cricket as a gambling sport akin to prizefighting and horse racing. The earliest mention of cricket-related gambling is in a 1646 court case that concerned non-payment of a wager. In 1652, another court case accused a gentleman called John Rabson, Esq. and other defendants who were all working class, revealing that cricket had crossed the social divide.

From the start of the English Civil War, the Long Parliament (1642–60) banned theatres and other social activities that met with Puritan disapproval, but there is no actual evidence of cricket being prohibited, except as previously that it was not allowed on Sundays. For example, three men were prosecuted at Eltham in Kent for playing cricket on a Sunday in 1654. Oliver Cromwell had established the Protectorate the previous year, so the Puritans were fully in control, but the defendants were charged with "breaking the Sabbath", not with playing cricket. It is believed that Cromwell himself was an early gentleman participant, having played both cricket and football as a young man.

It was during the second half of the 17th century that, in Roy Webber's words, "the game took a real grip" especially in the south-eastern counties. The nobility withdrew to their country estates during the Commonwealth and were involved in village cricket as a pastime which, after the Commonwealth expired in 1660, they continued to indulge when they returned to London. The Restoration was effectively completed during the spring of 1660 and one of its immediate results was an increase in gambling, mostly by the gentry, on cricket and other sports. In Harry Altham's view, the same period "was really the critical stage in the game's evolution" with a kind of "feudal patronage" being established as the nobility took control of the sport, their interest fuelled by the opportunities for gambling that it provided, and this set the pattern for cricket's development through the 18th century. The post-Restoration period saw the first "great matches" as cricket evolved into a major sport, a significant aspect of the evolution being the introduction of professionalism. Members of the nobility and gentry who returned to London after the Restoration were keen to develop cricket and brought with them some of the "local experts" from village cricket whom they now employed as professional players. Altham wrote that within a year or two of the Restoration, "it became the thing in London society to make matches and form clubs".

In 1694, accounts of Sir John Pelham record 2s 6d paid for a wager concerning a cricket match at Lewes. The earliest known newspaper report of a first-class match was in the Foreign Post dated Wednesday, 7 July 1697:

"The middle of last week a great match at cricket was played in Sussex; there were eleven of a side, and they played for fifty guineas apiece".

The high stakes on offer confirm the importance of the fixture and the fact that it was eleven-a-side suggests that two strong and well-balanced teams were assembled. No other details were given but the report provides real evidence to support the view that "great matches" played for high stakes were in vogue in the years following the Restoration. One of the main cricket patrons at the time was Charles Lennox, 1st Duke of Richmond, resident at Goodwood House in Sussex.

As the 17th century ended, cricket in the words of David Underdown was "embedded in the culture of many English social groups" – the aristocracy, the merchant class, the working class and even "the delinquents". The aristocracy was the group that advanced the cause of amateurism and did so, in several fields of activity, with the purpose of publicly asserting their political and social authority to emphasise, as Underdown said, "what they fondly believed was the popular nature of their rule". Their strategy was to portray themselves as regional and national leaders who nevertheless shared the habits and assumptions of their neighbours, and one of those habits was taking an active part in sport – not only by playing but in the main through conspicuous patronage. The willingness of aristocrats to mix with the working class on the cricket field may have helped to promote social stability; the historian G. M. Trevelyan wrote (admittedly concerning a period about a hundred years later): "If the French noblesse had been capable of playing cricket with their peasants, their chateaux would never have been burnt".

== 18th century ==
Patronage was of vital importance to the growth and development of cricket in the 18th century. It is extremely doubtful if cricket would ever have become a national sport without patronage and gambling. The key figures in the 18th century were the Dukes of Richmond; Edwin Stead; Sir William Gage; Frederick, Prince of Wales; Lord John Sackville; John Sackville, 3rd Duke of Dorset; Sir Horatio Mann; George Finch, 9th Earl of Winchilsea and, into the 19th century, Lord Frederick Beauclerk. They were all members of the nobility or the gentry, they all played cricket (Beauclerk and, to a lesser degree, Dorset were very good players) and they all gambled on matches.

To boost their chances of winning wagers, some patrons formed their own county-class teams such as the Kent and Sussex ones led by Stead and the 2nd Duke of Richmond in the 1720s. As players themselves, they captained their teams and it was gentlemen like them, and the friends whom they invited to play, who established cricket's amateur tradition. Professionals were paid a match fee for taking part. Thus, Sussex of the 1720s might be captained by Richmond and include not only additional gentlemen like his fellow patron Gage but also professionals like Thomas Waymark. That was the pattern of top-class English teams until 1962. Waymark, for example, was employed by the Duke of Richmond as a groom and this became a common arrangement between patron and professional in the 18th century. In later years, Lumpy Stevens and John Minshull were employed by their patrons as a gardener and gamekeeper respectively. In the longer term, however, the professional became an employee of his club and the beginnings of this trend could be observed in the 1770s when the Hambledon Club paid match fees to its players.

While the gentlemen were happy to play in the same team as the professionals, a form of apartheid was created off the field (e.g., separate changing rooms and gateways as mentioned above). Conscious of their higher social status, they used the fact that they were not paid a match fee to declare themselves amateurs, though not in the sense of someone playing the game as a spare-time hobby because they were either investing in each game by wagering or by claiming expenses for travel and accommodation. They styled themselves amateurs in order to erect a barrier between themselves and the working class professionals. The concept was a reflection not only of social status but also of the military mindset which perceived three separate classes: officers, sergeants and the so-called "other ranks". That classification was even extended to marriage in terms of "officers and their ladies, sergeants and their wives, other ranks and their women".

Assertion of authority was always an amateur trait and in no way was this more emphatically asserted than in the taking of full responsibility for drafting and agreeing, among themselves only, the Laws of cricket. The sport had rules from time immemorial but, as with football, subject to local variations. William Goldwin's 1706 poem In Certamen Pilae (On a Ball Game), which describes a rural cricket match, has a scene in which the teams dispute the rules of the match, each insisting on their own code of laws. Arbitration falls to a character called Nestor, clearly based on the Homeric ruler, who imposes his Justas Leges, acceptable to both teams. The context is uncertain but the phrase can be taken to mean an "established code". Goldwin, incidentally, was a scholar of both Eton and Cambridge.

In 1727, ahead of two games to be patronised by them, the 2nd Duke of Richmond and Alan Brodrick, 2nd Viscount Midleton, drew up Articles of Agreement to determine the terms and conditions applicable to their matches. This document, which has been preserved, is cricket's oldest set of written rules. Many of the rules are concerned with pitch dimensions, means of dismissal, scoring runs, etc. but there are some striking points which emphasised the authority of the patrons. For example, the Duke and Mr Brodrick selected an umpire each, as well as all the players, and only they were allowed to address the umpires. In 1744 and again in 1774, the first versions of what are now known as "The Laws of Cricket" were coded by the "Noblemen and Gentlemen" who, in 1744, frequented the Artillery Ground in London. By 1774, they were associated in cricketing terms with the Hambledon Club and, in London, with a convivial club called the "Je-ne-sais-quoi" which met at an establishment called the Star and Garter on Pall Mall.

The original Lord's ground was opened in May 1787 and was intended to be the private preserve of the same gentlemen's club, which from 1782 had become known as the White Conduit Club, based in Islington, and would soon reconstitute itself as Marylebone Cricket Club (MCC). Only a gentleman could become a member but the club from its very beginning employed or contracted professionals. Thomas Lord himself was a professional bowler at the White Conduit who was given the job of finding the ground that was afterwards named after him. Lord's immediately began to stage first-class matches and these attracted the crowds that some members had originally sought to avoid. MCC teams soon adopted the now age-old formula of "gentlemen" and "players" in the same team. Very early in its history, MCC claimed ownership of the Laws and re-published them on 30 May 1788. In the 21st century, MCC still retains copyright of the Laws although it is now the International Cricket Council (ICC) which has power of regulation.

The "noblemen and gentlemen" may have had the final word in cricket's governance during the 18th century but the professionals certainly had a voice, as illustrated by two famous incidents. In September 1771, when Chertsey played Hambledon at Laleham Burway, Chertsey's Thomas White introduced a bat that was fully as wide as the wicket. He was not actually cheating because there was no limit on bat size at the time, rather he was probably making a point in order to force an issue because straight bats were still new, having been introduced in the 1760s, and it is believed that there was no standard. The Hambledon professionals objected and their senior bowler Thomas Brett wrote out a formal protest that was signed by himself, his captain Richard Nyren and senior batsman John Small, all three being professional players. Brett's action brought about a change in the Laws, as confirmed in 1774, whereby the maximum width of the bat was set at four and one quarter inches. This ruling remains intact. In May 1775, master batsman Small was involved in the incident which resulted in the introduction of the third (middle) stump in the wicket. The wicket in 1775 still consisted of two uprights and a crosspiece, as it had from time immemorial. In a single wicket match played at the Artillery Ground, the great Chertsey bowler Lumpy Stevens (another professional) beat Small at least three times only for the ball to pass through the wicket without disturbing it, and Small won the match for Hambledon. Like Brett before him, Stevens protested and his petition was granted soon afterwards, although research has discovered that the introduction of the third stump in practice was gradual and the two-stump wicket did continue in places for a number of years yet.

== Gentlemen v Players ==
Lord Frederick Beauclerk was the leading "amateur" player of the Napoleonic period but he was notoriously mercenary, despite his status and his calling as an ordained minister of religion. In 1806, he had the idea of a match between the amateurs and the professionals. To emphasise the social distance between the two, the amateur team would be called the Gentlemen and the paid professionals the Players. Even then, it was not a straight match because Beauclerk selected the two leading professional players Billy Beldham and William Lambert as given men for the Gentlemen. Thanks mainly to Lambert's contribution, the Gentlemen won. The match was not a success but Beauclerk organised a repeat two weeks later, also at Lord's. This time, only Lambert was given, while Beldham joined the Players. The joint efforts of Beauclerk and Lambert earned another win for the Gentlemen. The seed for the long-running series had been planted but the fixture was not revived until 1819. Cricket was badly disrupted by the Napoleonic Wars, especially between 1810 and 1814. The 1819 match was won by the Players, who had the unquestionably amateur Lord Strathavon as a "given man", against a Gentlemen team that was all-amateur and included their best players Beauclerk, E. H. Budd and William Ward. As in 1806, the game attracted little interest but MCC were determined to persevere.

In 1821, the so-called "Coronation Match" could have killed the fixture. The Gentlemen were all out for 60 and then the Players steadily amassed 270–6, a large score given pitch conditions at the time, with Thomas Beagley scoring 113*, the first century in the series. Sometime during the second day, the Gentlemen got fed up of fielding and conceded defeat. Derek Birley remarked that it was called the "Coronation Match" to celebrate the accession of the unpopular George IV "and it was a suitably murky affair".

The fixture survived and managed to struggle through the 1820s and 1830s, when it was necessary to handicap the Players to give the Gentlemen a competitive chance. It became annual (often played more than once per season) from 1829. The teams were evenly matched in the early 1840s when Alfred Mynn and Nicholas Felix were in the Gentlemen team but then, of the 25 matches from July 1844 to July 1865, the Players won 23 with one draw and only one win for the Gentlemen.

In 1865, W. G. Grace came into the Gentlemen team and the picture changed completely with the Gentlemen dominant for the next twenty years. From the mid-1880s, the batsmen on each side were usually strong but the hallmark of the Players from that time became their greater strength in bowling and fielding, areas in which the Gentlemen were relatively weak after Grace was past his best.

The teams remained evenly matched until the end of the 19th century but in the 130 encounters between 1900 and 1962, the Gentlemen won only 15, with the Players winning 57 and 58 being drawn.

The Gentlemen's last victory, at Scarborough in September 1953, was achieved after the Players had scored 532–5 declared (Len Hutton 241) in their first innings. The Gentlemen, captained by Hutton's Yorkshire colleague Norman Yardley, replied with 447–8 declared (Peter May 157). Hutton sportingly declared the Players' second innings at 165–6 to give the Gentlemen a feasible target of 251 in the final sessions. Thanks to an innings of 133 by Bill Edrich, they won by 5 wickets.

Meanwhile, social change after the Second World War was leading inexorably to a reaction against the concept of amateurism in English cricket and, on 31 January 1963, all first-class cricketers became nominally professional as, in effect, "Players".

The last edition of the Gentlemen v Players fixture was played 8, 10 and 11 September 1962 at Scarborough. The Players, under the captaincy of Fred Trueman, won by 7 wickets. The Gentlemen scored 328 and 217; the Players replied with 337 and 212–3. Ken Barrington, with exactly 100, scored the last century in the series.

== 19th century ==
In 1801, an antiquarian book about English sport noted that cricket had become "exceedingly fashionable, being much countenanced by the nobility and gentlemen of fortune". In another work a year later, the fashion for cricket was deplored because it was (and remains) a dangerous activity, the writer saying that the country expects very different from those of "rank and fortune" than from those of "the labouring classes". The determining factor in cricket's future as an "exceedingly fashionable" sport was its popularity, handed down through generations from old boys to new boys, in the fee-paying ("public") schools. Even so, headmasters of the time were not convinced that inter-school rivalry was a good thing and, when Eton played Harrow at Lord's in 1805, the match was organised by the boys themselves, among them Lord Byron.

Like everything else, cricket struggled as the Napoleonic Wars wore on and very few matches were played when the conflict escalated from 1810 to 1814. MCC were accused by some critics of not providing leadership or vision but in fact MCC kept the game alive and maintained a profile. There was a discernible change in the type of membership as the war progressed. As the 1820s began, the aristocrats like Dorset, Winchilsea and Colonel Lennox had gone and MCC's leading lights then, besides Beauclerk, included E. H. Budd, a civil servant, and William Ward, a banker. Having been founded by "noblemen and gentlemen", MCC now belonged to the "gentlemen" and, as such, they were keen to maintain their "declaration of social realities" by matching teams of Gentlemen against teams of paid Players.

From the 1820s to the 1860s, the influence and status of amateurism steadily rose to a zenith that Derek Birley called the Amateur Ambuscade and Harry Altham called the Halcyon Days of Amateur Cricket. Standards of play at the fee-paying schools and at the two great universities rose to an unprecedented height that remains unsurpassed. Having said that, credit for the prolonged success of the Gentlemen against the Players through the 1870s belongs essentially to W. G. Grace, who became an amateur by special MCC invitation. None of the Grace brothers attended public school or university; they learned how to play at home and in local club cricket. This period of amateur dominance, encompassing as it did the so-called Golden Age of cricket, lasted until an erosion set in after the First World War which ultimately resulted in the abolition of amateurism in 1962.

Gentlemen v Players became the most famous match of the 19th century, albeit challenged by North v South and by the annual matches between the All-England Eleven (the AEE) and the United All-England Eleven (the UEE), until international cricket and the official County Championship began. In amateur circles, it was one of three main events of the cricket season. The others were The University Match between Oxford and Cambridge, which was first played in 1827; and until 1854 the Schools Week at Lord's, involving the teams of Eton, Harrow and Winchester. Cricket was played at the schools and universities in the 18th century but it was never really noteworthy until the Eton v Harrow match of 1805 although, like Gentlemen v Players, that match was followed by a hiatus until it was revived and became established, a few exceptions aside, as an annual fixture at Lord's. The first University Match was played at Lord's in 1827 and it became an annual fixture from 1838, again played mostly at Lord's. There was no inter-county cricket through the Napoleonic Wars and it was not revived until 1825 when Sussex played four matches, two each against Hampshire and Kent. These county teams were still the largely ad hoc units of the 18th century, reliant on patronage. The first formally constituted county club was Sussex in 1839, followed in the 1840s by Cambridgeshire, Kent, Nottinghamshire and Surrey; in the 1860s by Hampshire, Lancashire, Middlesex and Yorkshire; and then by Derbyshire and the Grace family's Gloucestershire in 1870.

== Abolition of amateurism ==
The abolition of amateur status in 1962 was partly the result of long-established disillusionment with the hypocrisy known as "shamateurism". The amateur was, by definition, not a professional and in November 1878, the haughtily worded dictum of the amateur-dominated Marylebone Cricket Club (MCC) was:

"that no gentleman ought to make a profit by his service (sic) in the cricket field".

They also added an empty threat that anyone found guilty of profiteering would be barred from taking part in the Gentlemen v Players match at Lord's.

In practice, many leading amateurs were paid for playing, and it is widely believed that the most famous amateur cricketer, W. G. Grace, made more money out of cricket than any genuine professional. In Charles Williams' view, the dictum was very subtly worded because it did not forbid amateurs from making money from cricket off the field of play. In fairness to Grace, he was a general practitioner who had to pay for a locum tenens to run his medical practice while he was playing cricket, and he had a reputation for treating poor and impoverished patients at a lowered or no fee. C. B. Fry commented that Grace was the only man who became a doctor of medicine "on account of successful operations on the cricket field".

The use of the term "shamateurism" apparently originated during the English tour of Australia in 1887–88, a venture from which certain amateurs, notably George Vernon, Andrew Stoddart and Walter Read, were known to be profiting. Long before that, the Grace brothers had been notorious for submitting excessive expense claims but, when an official enquiry was held into their activities in January 1879, the outcome was an official whitewash and they continued to profit. In the 20th century, there were cases of amateur players being given a nominal job, such as county club assistant secretary. Sometimes, there were allegations of surreptitiously paid bonuses over and above the bona fide travelling and hotel expenses that they were entitled to claim.

Although concerns about shamateurism were widespread, the abolition of amateurism was actually the result of interaction by two irresistible forces:

- Firstly, the tide of social change in the wake of the Second World War and the growth of a more egalitarian society in general.
- Secondly, the demand for dedicated professionalism in sports such as cricket and football that became increasingly conscious of their business obligations and the need to generate income through success on the field.

An example of the latter is cricket authorities ending the Gentlemen v Players fixture after amateurism was abolished (and with it the raison d'etre for the fixture) on 31 January 1963, and introducing the Gillette Cup limited overs knockout competition (which was also the first sponsored cricket competition) in its place.

There were contrasting views about the end of amateurism and the passing of Gentlemen v Players. Some traditionalists like E. W. Swanton and the editor of Wisden Cricketers' Almanack lamented the "passing of an era". On the other hand, social change had rendered the whole concept an anachronism, and Fred Trueman spoke for many when he described amateurism as a "ludicrous business" that was "thankfully abolished" and said he was glad there would be "no more fancy caps".

Charles Williams commented that amateurism in the highest levels of cricket had become "so ludicrous in its presentation and corrupt in its practice" that its end was a necessity, but he praised other aspects of the concept – its so-called "Corinthian spirit" whereby a game was played with "honour and verve" – which he believed had value and the disappearance of which would in time be seen as a loss to society.

== Bibliography ==
- Altham, H. S. (1962). A History of Cricket. Vol. 1 (to 1914). George Allen & Unwin.
- Birley, Derek (1999). A Social History of English Cricket. Aurum.
- Bowen, Rowland (1970). Cricket: A History of its Growth and Development. Eyre & Spottiswoode.
- Brodley, Lawrence (2013). A Soldier of the Empire. ShieldCrest.
- Haygarth, Arthur (1862). Scores & Biographies. Vol. One (1744–1826). Lillywhite.
- Major, John (2007). More Than a Game. HarperCollins.
- McCann, Tim (2004). Sussex Cricket in the Eighteenth Century'. Sussex Record Society.
- Preston, Norman (1963). Wisden Cricketers' Almanack (100th ed.). London: Sporting Handbooks Ltd.
- Swanton, E. W., ed. (1986). Barclays World of Cricket. Willow Books.
- Trueman, Fred (2004). As It Was. Macmilla.
- Underdown, David (2000). Start of Play. Allen Lane.
- Warner, Pelham (1946). Lord's 1787–1945. Harrap.
- Webber, Roy (1960). The Phoenix History of Cricket. Phoenix.
- Williams, Charles (2012). Gentlemen & Players – The Death of Amateurism in Cricket. Weidenfeld & Nicolson.
