= 1728 English cricket season =

Cricket season review

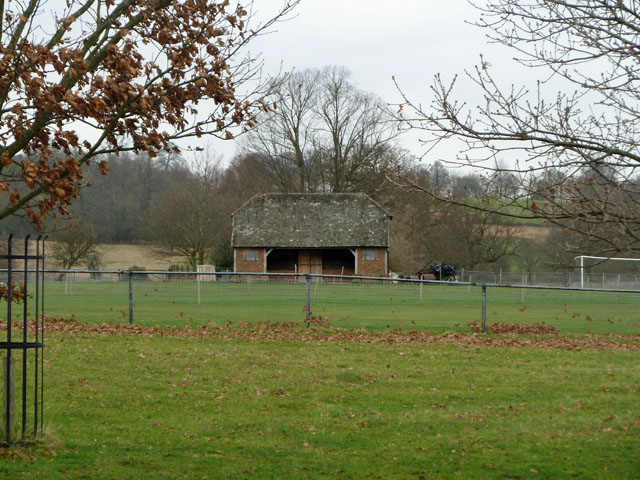
Cricket pavilion at Penshurst Park

In the 1728 English cricket season, it is possible to discern the existence of an inter-county rivalry between teams representative of Kent and Sussex. Details of four historically important matches are known. (Note: Any match listed in the ACS' Important Match Guide (1981) is historically important, and therefore of the highest standard, whether or not a scorecard might exist. The same applies to numerous matches discovered by researchers since 1981. For further information, see First-class cricket.)

A Swiss traveller in southern England recorded county cricket as "a commonplace" and wrote that it unites "the common people and men of rank". Teams of county strength were being formed as the patrons sought stronger combinations to help them in the serious, for them, business of winning wagers. Easily the most successful in 1728 was Edwin Stead whose Kent was "too expert" for Sussex, led by the 2nd Duke of Richmond and Sir William Gage.

== Kent v Sussex ==
There were three matches between teams which were potentially representative of Kent and Sussex. Nominally, however, the Kent team was Edwin Stead's XI, while the Sussex team in the first two matches was the 2nd Duke of Richmond's XI, and Sir William Gage's XI in the third. The first match was on Coxheath Common, then called Cock's Heath, on 25 June, pre-announced in the Kentish Weekly Post on 19 June. They played a return match at Penshurst Park sometime in July; this one was the subject of a brief notice in the Whitehall Evening Post dated 6 August 1728.

Reports of the third match, played at Penshurst Park in either late July or early August, state that it was "the third time this summer that the Kent men have been too expert for those of Sussex". The 6 August editions of both the London Evening Post and the Daily Journal include the "too expert" comment, and so modern sources agree that Stead's XI won both of the matches against Richmond's XI. The third match between Stead's XI and Gage's XI was for a stake of 50 guineas. It was hosted by John Sidney, 6th Earl of Leicester, at Penshurst Park. Stead's XI won by 7 runs – the newspaper report says "the former [Gage's XI] wanted 7 to be even with (them)".

The proclamation of Kent's superiority in 1728 is the first time that the concept of a "champion county" can be seen in the sources, and it was augmented by a "turned the scales" comment made by a reporter after Sussex defeated Kent in 1729. The 1729 report added that the "scale of victory had been on the Kentish team for some years past". In 1730, a newspaper referred to the "Kentish champions".

== Richmond's XI v Gage's XI ==
There was a match in August between Richmond's XI and Gage's XI. The sources say the teams "met again" but it is not clear if they had already played each other in 1728; they had met in earlier seasons. The match was at an unspecified venue in Lewes and the result is unknown.

== Other events ==
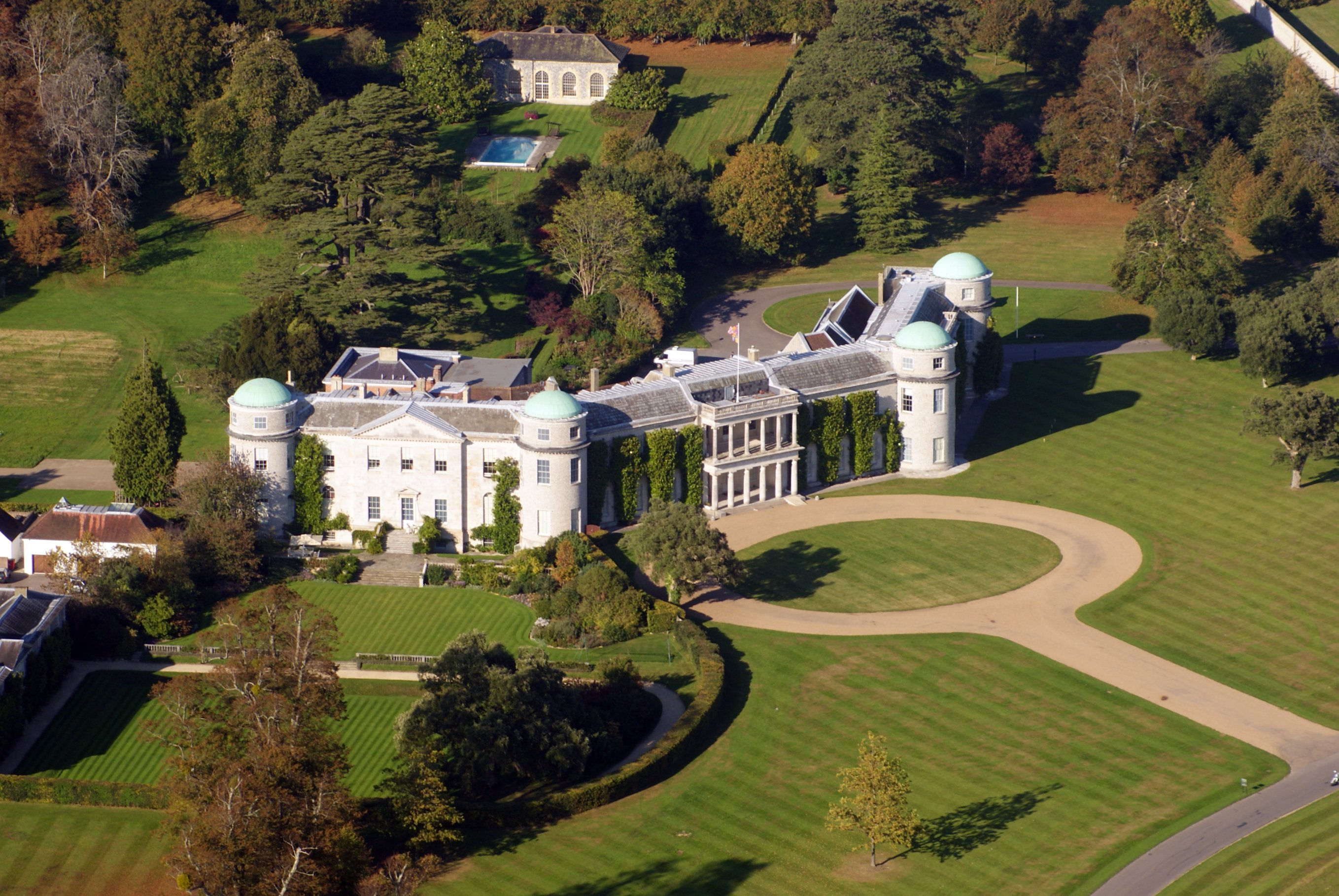
Goodwood House

Swiss traveller César-François de Saussure noted in his journal the frequency with which he saw cricket being played while he was making his journeys across southern England in June. He referred to county matches as "a commonplace" and wrote that "everyone plays it, the common people and also men of rank". Saussure's comment was:

The English are very fond of a game they call cricket. For this purpose they go into a large open field, and knock a small ball about with a piece of wood. I will not attempt to describe this game to you, as it is too complicated, but it requires agility and skill, and everyone plays it, the common people and also the men of rank. Sometimes one county plays against another county. The papers give notice of these meetings beforehand, and, later, tell you which team has come off victorious. Spectators crowd to see the games when they are important.

In several sources, a Gentlemen of Middlesex v Gentlemen of London match is listed as due to take place in Islington on Tuesday (sic), 5 August. In fact, 5 August 1728 was a Monday, and recent research has confirmed that the match in question was due to be held on Tuesday, 5 August 1729.

The archives at Goodwood House, Richmond's seat, include numerous receipts for purchases made by the Duke in 1728 which relate to his cricketing interests. Three are from a tradesman called Walter Seagar for "binding bats at Lyndhurst", the amounts ranging from 2 to 4 shillings. Another, dated 21 June, is for "11 pairs of men's thread hose for ye gentlemen Crickett players" amounting to £2 9s 6d. Also, in an undated accounting entry, the Duke paid 12 shillings each for "twelve yellow velvet caps with silver tassells", which is understood to have been his team colours.

== Bibliography ==
- ACS (1981). A Guide to Important Cricket Matches Played in the British Isles 1709–1863. Nottingham: ACS.
- Ashley-Cooper, F. S. (1929). Kent Cricket Matches, 1719–1880. Canterbury: Gibbs & Sons. OCLC 220674085.
- Buckley, G. B. (1935). Fresh Light on 18th Century Cricket. Birmingham: Cotterell & Co. OCLC 23450280.
- Maun, Ian (2009). From Commons to Lord's, Volume One: 1700 to 1750. Cambridge: Roger Heavens. ISBN 978-19-00592-52-9.
- Maun, Ian (2011). From Commons to Lord's, Volume Two: 1751 to 1770. Leicester: Martin Wilson. ISBN 978-09-56906-60-1.
- McCann, Tim (2004). Sussex Cricket in the Eighteenth Century. Lewes: Sussex Record Society. ISBN 978-08-54450-55-8.
- Waghorn, H. T. (2005) [1906]. The Dawn of Cricket. London: J. W. McKenzie. ISBN 978-09-47821-17-3.
- Wilson, Martin (2005). An Index to Waghorn. London: Bodyline Books (limited edition, by subscription only).
