= 1729 English cricket season =

Cricket season review

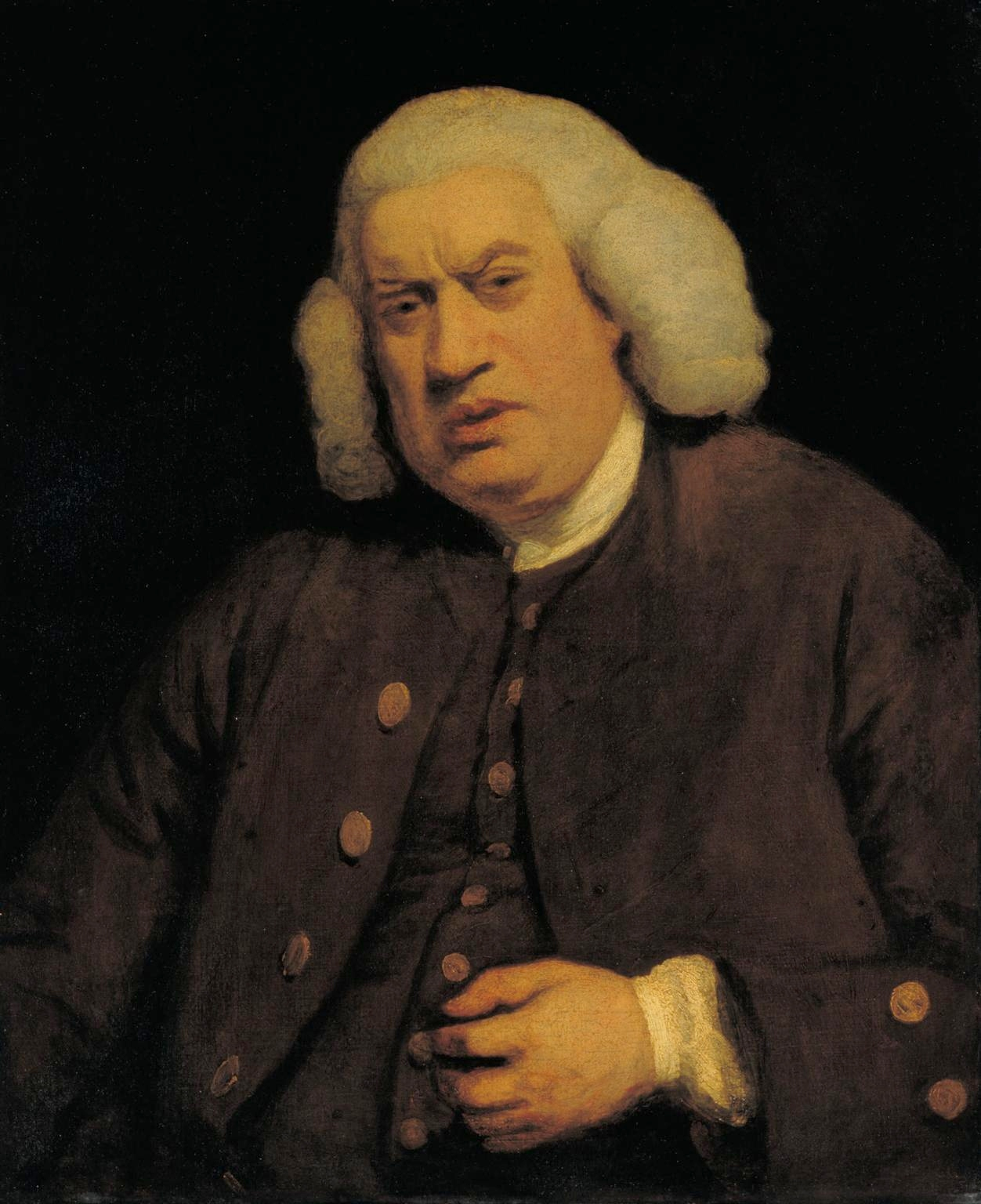
Samuel Johnson took part in cricket matches at the University of Oxford in 1729.

There are signs of increasing media interest in the 1729 English cricket season as reports of seven historically important matches have survived, compared with four in each of the two previous years. (Note: Any match listed in the ACS' Important Match Guide (1981) is historically important, and therefore of the highest standard, whether or not a scorecard might exist. The same applies to numerous matches discovered by researchers since 1981. For further information, see First-class cricket.)

Although the source information is confusing, Sir William Gage's XI achieved the earliest known innings victory when they defeated Edwin Stead's XI at Penshurst Park in August. The best of the known professional players at this time was the all-rounder Thomas Waymark, who was a groom employed by the 2nd Duke of Richmond.

Cricket continued to spread throughout England, and is known to have reached both Gloucestershire and Norfolk in 1729; also, its popularity at the University of Oxford was attested by Dr Samuel Johnson, a student there at the time. The oldest known bat, now on display in the Kennington Oval pavilion, is dated 1729.

== Dartford v London ==
Dartford and London played each other twice in 1729. The first match, on 30 July, was played in Dartford—probably on Dartford Brent. The stake was £50 but the result of the match is unknown. A return match took place 5 August on Kennington Common, and the 7 August edition of the London Evening Post says: "On Tuesday was played a great cricket match on Kennington Common between the Londoners and the Dartford men for a considerable sum of money, wagers and bets, the latter beat the former very much". This match is mentioned in correspondence to the 4 September 1890 edition of Cricket: A Weekly Record of the Game.

== Inter-county matches ==
There were two matches in which both teams were named after their respective counties. However, there is no certainty at this stage of cricket's development that any team was representative of a whole county. It has been suggested that teams called Kent, for example, consisted of players from the Dartford area only. Kent played in both matches, one against Sussex and the other against Surrey. Neither result is known.

Kent played Sussex 24 June on Walworth Common, a neutral venue in Surrey which was used occasionally during this period. The London Evening Post pre-announced: "On Tuesday next at Walworth Common will be play'd a Match at Cricket between the Counties of Kent and Sussex, for fifty Pounds a side, to meet at One o'Clock, play or pay". That is a typical example of an eighteenth century notice. This one is unusual, however, in its emphasis upon county names, rather than some other nomenclature, and it is notable as the earliest mention of a team expressly called Sussex, though teams of similar strength had been raised by Sussex patrons in earlier seasons.

The 26 August edition of the Daily Journal reported that a match would be played same day near Farnham between "Mr Steed (sic) of Kent and his Company, against the best Players in the County of Surrey". Farnham was later known for its Holt Pound ground that was associated with Billy Beldham and John Wells.

== Gage's XI v Stead's XI ==
Edwin Stead of Kent again matched his team against those of his Sussex rivals, the 2nd Duke of Richmond and Sir William Gage. As a newspaper report said, "the scale of victory (for some years past) has been generally on the Kentish side". But, on 28 August, when Stead's XI met Gage's XI at Penshurst Park, Gage's team is believed to have gained the earliest known innings victory (i.e., scoring more in one completed innings than their opponents in two). It is understood that Stead's XI were all players from Kent, but Gage's XI included players from Hampshire and Surrey as well as Sussex, and is also known as Hampshire, Surrey & Sussex. The match was played for 100 guineas with "some thousands" watching.

The newspaper says Gage's XI "got as many within 3 in one Hand, as the former did in two, so the Kentish men flung it up". A "hand" was a team's innings but the report is confusing because Stead's XI must have batted last and they apparently conceded the match when still three runs behind—therefore Gage's XI won by an innings and three runs. Thomas Waymark, described as "a groom of the Duke of Richmond" was the outstanding player. The report says he "signalised himself by extraordinary agility and dexterity" and "turned the scale of victory".

There was a return match in September on "The Downs" near Lewes. A report in the British Journal on 13 September says: "The great match played at Penshurst will be played again in Sussex". As before, it was effectively Kent against a team from three counties. F. S. Ashley-Cooper asserted that the three counties team should have been called England, even though cricket at that time had still not made headway beyond its native southeast.

== Gloucestershire ==
Cricket continued to spread throughout England, and a local game in Gloucester on 22 September 1729 is the earliest known reference to cricket in the county of Gloucestershire. The match was pre-announced 15 September in the Gloucester Journal which said the prize was "upwards of 20 guineas".

== Gentlemen ==
There has been confusion over a pre-announced match on Tuesday, 5 August 1729. In H. T. Waghorn's original research, he noted the date as Tuesday, 5 August 1728, and several sources have subsequently listed the match in 1728. A review of the primary source confirmed that the match in question was due to be held on Tuesday, 5 August 1729. The given day of the week did not match the calendar, because 5 August 1728 was a Monday. The teams were the Gentlemen of Middlesex and the Gentlemen of London; they were due to meet "in the Field behind the Woolpack Back Gate near Sadler's Wells" for a stake of £50 per side.

It is not known if the match was actually played, but it is the earliest known to involve teams using "Gentlemen" in their name, and it was also the first in which a team is called Middlesex. "Gentlemen only" matches did not involve professionals, and are not as highly rated as those that did, especially so on this occasion as the London club's first team was playing Dartford on the same day (see § Dartford v London).

== Other events ==
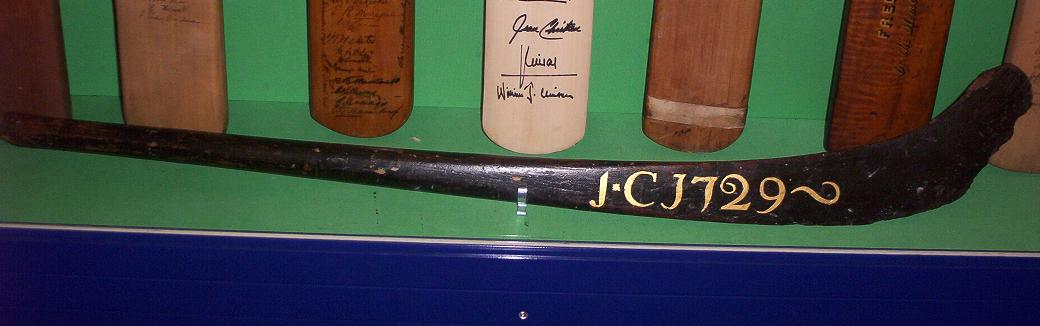
The oldest cricket bat still in existence dates from 1729. Note the shape, which is more like that of a modern-day hockey stick than a modern-day cricket bat. It is kept in the Sandham Room in the Member's Pavilion at Kennington Oval.

There is a bat in the Kennington Oval pavilion which belonged to John Chitty of Knaphill, Surrey. Dated 1729, it is the oldest known bat. It looks more like a field hockey stick than a modern cricket bat, but its curvature was to enable the batsman to play a ball that was always rolled or skimmed along the ground, as in bowls, never pitched. Pitching began about 30 years later, and the straight bats used nowadays were invented in response to the pitched delivery.

Although matches in the county of Norfolk are unknown before 1745, the Norwich Gazette and the Norwich Mercury both carried notices for the Gage/Stead match in September 1729.

Dr Samuel Johnson attended the University of Oxford from October 1728 until the following summer, and later told James Boswell that cricket matches were played there. Boswell mentioned this in his Life of Samuel Johnson.

== First mentions ==
=== Counties ===
- Gloucestershire

=== Clubs and teams ===
- Sussex (pre-1839)
- Gentlemen of London
- Gentlemen of Middlesex
- Hampshire, Surrey & Sussex (combined)

=== Players ===
- John Chitty (Surrey)

=== Venues ===
- Walworth Common
- "Woolpack", Islington
- Farnham (unspecified)
- Gloucester (unspecified)
- "The Downs", near Lewes

== Bibliography ==
- ACS (1981). A Guide to Important Cricket Matches Played in the British Isles 1709–1863. Nottingham: ACS. OCLC 85045528.
- Ashley-Cooper, F. S. (1929). Kent Cricket Matches, 1719–1880. Canterbury: Gibbs & Sons. OCLC 220674085.
- Bowen, Rowland (1970). Cricket: A History of its Growth and Development. London: Eyre & Spottiswoode. ISBN 978-04-13278-60-9.
- Buckley, G. B. (1935). Fresh Light on 18th Century Cricket. Birmingham: Cotterell & Co. OCLC 23450280.
- Buckley, G. B. (1937). Fresh Light on pre-Victorian Cricket. Birmingham: Cotterell & Co. OCLC 23469107.
- Maun, Ian (2009). From Commons to Lord's, Volume One: 1700 to 1750. Cambridge: Roger Heavens. ISBN 978-19-00592-52-9.
- McCann, Tim (2004). Sussex Cricket in the Eighteenth Century (PDF). Vol. 88. Lewes: West Sussex Record Office. ISBN 978-08-54450-55-8.
- Waghorn, H. T. (2005) [1906]. The Dawn of Cricket. London: J. W. McKenzie. ISBN 978-09-47821-17-3.
- Wilson, Martin (2005). An Index to Waghorn. London: Bodyline Books (limited edition, by subscription only).
