= Penshurst Park =

Cricket ground in Kent

Penshurst Park Cricket Ground
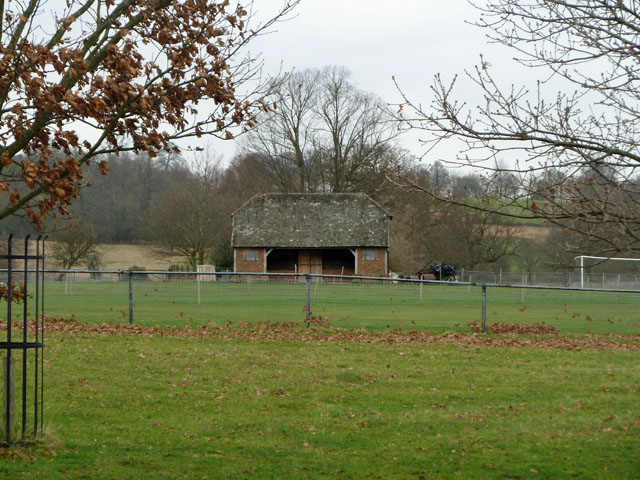
- The pavilion at the ground
- Interactive map of Penshurst Park Cricket Ground
- Location: Penshurst Place, Penshurst, near Tonbridge, Kent
- Coordinates: 51.177°N 0.183°E
- Home club: Penshurst Park Cricket Club
- Establishment: 1723

Penshurst Park Cricket Ground, also known as the Earl of Leicester's Park, is a cricket ground at Penshurst in Kent. It is one of the oldest cricket venues in England. Part of the Penshurst Place estate, it hosted its first recorded match in 1724.

== 18th-century cricket ==
Penshurst Park, then the seat of John Sidney, 6th Earl of Leicester, is known to have been the venue for four historically important matches played between 1724 and 1729. It is first recorded in 1724 for a match involving a combined Penshurst, Tonbridge & Wadhurst team against Dartford. In the 1728 season, it was the venue for two matches organised by Kent patron Edwin Stead against teams led by the 2nd Duke of Richmond and Sir William Gage. In the 1729 season, Stead used it as his home venue for another match against Sir William Gage's XI.

=== 1728 matches ===
There were three matches in 1728 between teams representing Kent and Sussex. Nominally, however, the Kent team was Edwin Stead's XI, while the Sussex team in the first two matches was the 2nd Duke of Richmond's XI, and Sir William Gage's XI in the third. Stead's XI won the first match against Richmond's XI, which was played on Coxheath Common, and a return took place at Penshurst Park sometime in July. It was the subject of a brief notice in the Whitehall Evening Post dated 6 August 1728.

The third match, hosted by the Earl of Leicester at Penshurst Park in either late July or early August, was between Stead's XI and Gage's XI. Reports in both the 6 August editions of both the London Evening Post and the Daily Journal say of the match that it was "the third time this summer that the Kent men have been too expert for those of Sussex". Based on this, modern sources agree that Stead's XI won both of the matches against Richmond's XI. The Stead v Gage match was played for a stake of 50 guineas, and Stead's XI won by 7 runs – the newspaper report says "the former [Gage's XI] wanted 7 to be even with (them)".

=== 1729 match ===
Stead's XI met Gage's XI at Penshurst Park on 28 August 1729. Gage's XI is believed to have gained the earliest known innings victory (i.e., scoring more in one completed innings than their opponents in two). It is understood that Stead's XI were all players from Kent, but Gage's XI included players from Hampshire and Surrey as well as Sussex, and is also known as Hampshire, Surrey & Sussex. Ashley-Cooper says Gage's XI should be called England. The match was played for 100 guineas with "some thousands" watching.

According to the British Journal, Gage's XI "got as many within 3 in one Hand, as the former did in two, so the Kentish men flung it up". A "hand" was a team's innings but the report is confusing because Stead's XI must have batted last and they apparently conceded the match when still three runs behind—therefore Gage's XI won by an innings and three runs. Thomas Waymark, described as "a groom of the Duke of Richmond" was the outstanding player. The report says he "signalised himself by extraordinary agility and dexterity" and "turned the scale of victory".

== Penshurst Park Cricket Club ==
The ground is now the home of Penshurst Park Cricket Club, founded in 1752, which is a member of the Kent County Village League. In each of the 1969 and 1972 seasons, the club hosted the visiting Toronto Cricket Club at Penshurst Park.

== Bibliography ==
- Ashley-Cooper, F. S. (1929). Kent Cricket Matches, 1719–1880. Canterbury: Gibbs & Sons. OCLC 220674085.
- Buckley, G. B. (1935). Fresh Light on 18th Century Cricket. Birmingham: Cotterell & Co. OCLC 23450280.
- Maun, Ian (2009). From Commons to Lord's, Volume One: 1700 to 1750. Cambridge: Roger Heavens. ISBN 978-19-00592-52-9.
- McCann, Tim (2004). Sussex Cricket in the Eighteenth Century (PDF). Vol. 88. Lewes: West Sussex Record Office. ISBN 978-08-54450-55-8.
- Waghorn, H. T. (2005) [1906]. The Dawn of Cricket. London: J. W. McKenzie. ISBN 978-09-47821-17-3.
- Wilson, Martin (2005). An Index to Waghorn. London: Bodyline Books (limited edition, by subscription only). [ISBN unspecified]
