= 1727 English cricket season =

Cricket season review

In the 1727 English cricket season, matches are, for the first time, known to have been played in accordance with agreed, written rules. Articles of Agreement were drawn up by the 2nd Duke of Richmond and Alan Brodrick, two of the sport's foremost patrons, to formalise the rules applicable to matches which they promoted. Details of four historically important matches have survived. (Note: Any match listed in the ACS' Important Match Guide (1981) is historically important, and therefore of the highest standard, whether or not a scorecard might exist. The same applies to numerous matches discovered by researchers since 1981. For further information, see First-class cricket.)

== Articles of Agreement ==
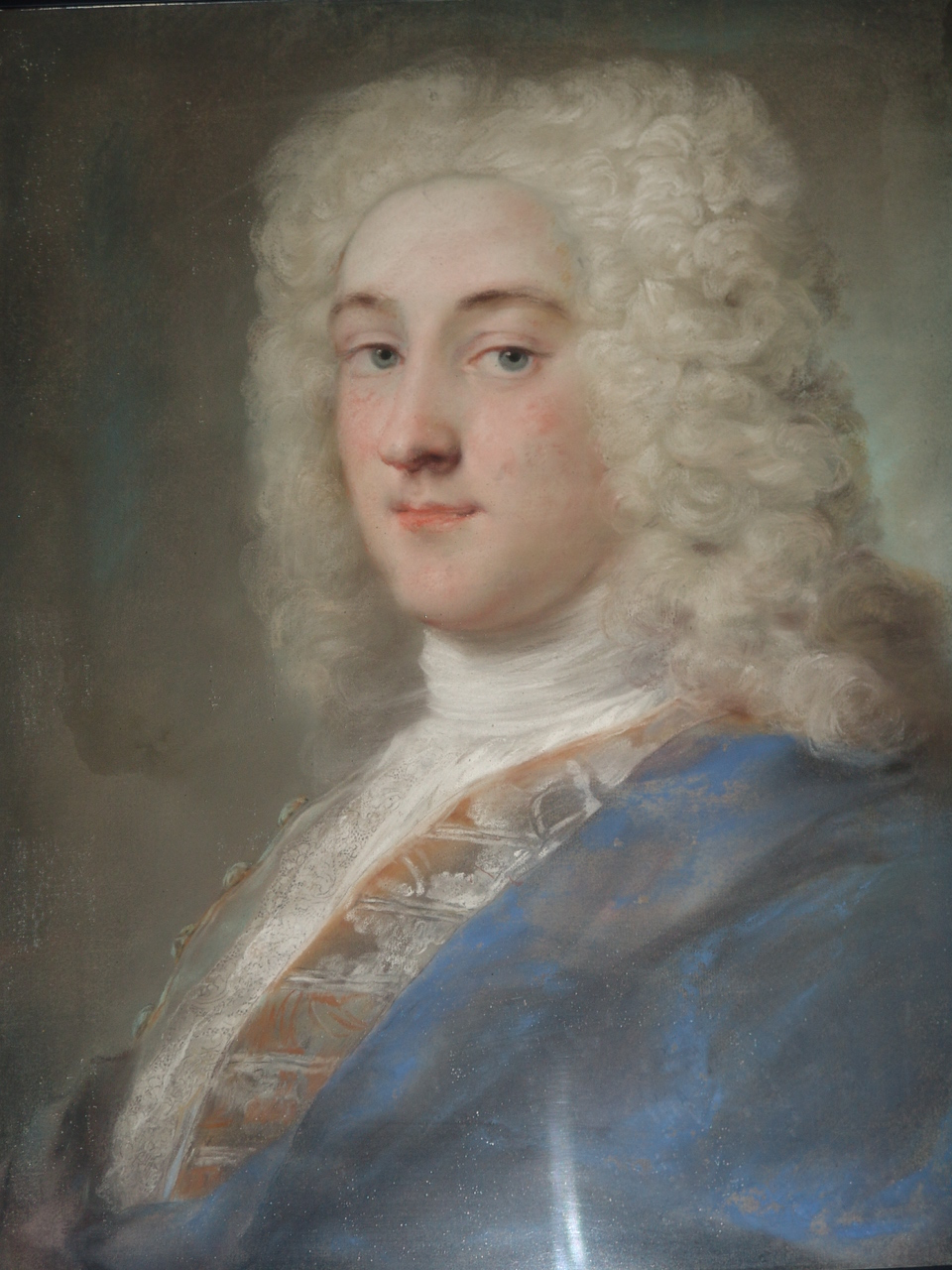
Alan Brodrick

The Articles of Agreement drawn up by the 2nd Duke of Richmond and Alan Brodrick may have been the first instance of rules being formally agreed, although rules as such definitely existed and, as in the early days of football, would have been agreed orally and subject to local variations. The Articles themselves are the source for two matches played earlier in the 1727 season by the 2nd Duke of Richmond's XI and Sir William Gage's XI. One of the written conditions is "the Duke of Richmond to choose any Gamesters, who have played in either of His Grace's two last Matches with Sir William Gage". Nothing else is known about the two Richmond v Gage matches.

The first match between Richmond's XI and Alan Brodrick's XI was played in July, probably at Peper Harow, as the Articles state: "the first Match shall be played some day of this instant July in the county of Surry". Peper Harow is mentioned: "Mr. Brodrick to choose any Gamesters within three Miles of Pepperhara (sic), provided they actually lived there last Lady Day". Peper Harow is about four miles from Godalming, and was the home of the Brodrick family. There is a view that it was the venue of the match in July. The Articles then state: "the second match to be played in August next in the County of Sussex, the Place to be named by the Duke of Richmond". The chosen venue is unknown.

Thomas Waymark is the only player mentioned in connection with either match. Accounted the first great all-rounder, Waymark played for over 20 years and was noted for his "extraordinary agility and dexterity".

== Other events ==
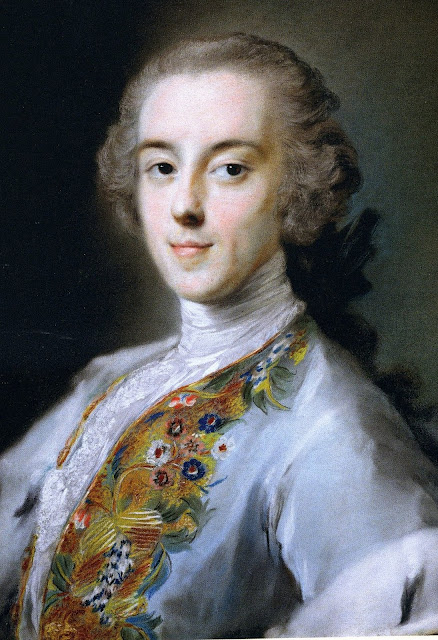
Horace Walpole

Horace Walpole commented that cricket was already "common" at Eton College. This is the earliest reference to cricket being played both at Eton, and in the county of Berkshire.

A match was played at Cranbrook, Kent on Monday, 29 May between "14 old men of that town". The oldest, Richard Shefe, was 84. The match was to celebrate Restoration Day, also known as Oak Apple Day.

There was a game on Warehorne Green, at Warehorne in Kent, on Monday, 5 June that was arranged by George Baker, Esq. who is described as the General Receiver; and Thomas Hodges, Esq. The teams were Warehorne v Hawkshurst, and they played twelve-a-side.

== First mentions ==
=== Counties ===
- Berkshire (and at Eton College)

=== Clubs and teams ===
- Alan Brodrick's XI

=== Players ===
- Alan Brodrick (Surrey)
- Thomas Waymark (Sussex)

=== Venues ===
- Cranbrook
- Peper Harow
- Warehorne Green

== Bibliography ==
- ACS (1981). A Guide to Important Cricket Matches Played in the British Isles 1709–1863. Nottingham: ACS. OCLC 85045528.
- Bowen, Rowland (1970). Cricket: A History of its Growth and Development. London: Eyre & Spottiswoode. ISBN 978-04-13278-60-9.
- Buckley, G. B. (1935). Fresh Light on 18th Century Cricket. Birmingham: Cotterell & Co. OCLC 23450280.
- Major, John (2007). More Than A Game. London: HarperCollins. ISBN 978-00-07183-64-7 – via Internet Archive.
- Marshall, John (1961). The Duke Who Was Cricket. London: Frederick Muller Ltd. OCLC 11214571.
- Maun, Ian (2009). From Commons to Lord's, Volume One: 1700 to 1750. Cambridge: Roger Heavens. ISBN 978-19-00592-52-9.
- McCann, Tim (2004). Sussex Cricket in the Eighteenth Century (PDF). Vol. 88. Lewes: West Sussex Record Office. ISBN 978-08-54450-55-8.
