= 1763 English cricket season =

Cricket season review

The 1763 English cricket season began after the Seven Years' War had ended in February that year. Details have survived of two historically important eleven-a-side matches. (Note: Any match listed in the ACS' Important Match Guide (1981) is historically important, and therefore of the highest standard, whether or not a scorecard might exist. The same applies to numerous matches discovered by researchers since 1981. For further information, see First-class cricket.)

== Surrey v Middlesex ==
Surrey and Middlesex met 3 August on Ripley Green, and again 22 & 23 August on the Artillery Ground. The first was played for £200, and Middlesex won 'with great ease'.

In the second match, Middlesex won 'by a great majority'. One newspaper reported that, during play on the first day, a spectator lost over £20 to a pickpocket. The Artillery Ground had by this time fallen into disrepute, and it would not last much longer as a major venue.

== End of the war ==
1763 was an important year for England, and for the future of cricket, as it marked the end of the Seven Years' War. French influence in India was reduced to a handful of trading posts, and its hopes of an eastern Empire were no more, though Napoleon Bonaparte certainly tried to revive those hopes. Great Britain expanded its interests in India to begin the era of the British Raj, a consequence of which was the eventual hegemony of cricket in Indian sport. In the short term, however, economic hardship at home meant little capital for investment in cricket, as evidenced by only a couple of matches in 1763.

== Edmund Chapman ==
Wednesday, 30 July. The death of Mr Edmund Chapman of Chertsey in his 69th year, which means he was born in either 1694 or 1695. Chapman was an eminent master bricklayer, and "accounted one of the most dexterous cricket players in England". There are no earlier references to Edmund Chapman who must have been active c.1715 to c.1740, presumably playing for Chertsey Cricket Club, or perhaps Croydon Cricket Club, and for Surrey as a county.

== Other events ==
Rowland Bowen found a brief 1763 reference to cricket in Pembroke, and assumed it meant the town in Wales. However, later research discovered that the item was a reference to cricket at Pembroke College, Oxford. The earliest-known mention of cricket in Wales is a letter written by a Swansea resident in April 1771.

== Bibliography ==
- ACS (1981). A Guide to Important Cricket Matches Played in the British Isles 1709–1863. Nottingham: ACS. OCLC 85045528.
- Bowen, Rowland (1970). Cricket: A History of its Growth and Development. London: Eyre & Spottiswoode. ISBN 978-04-13278-60-9.
- Buckley, G. B. (1937). Fresh Light on pre-Victorian Cricket. Birmingham: Cotterell & Co. OCLC 23469107.
- Maun, Ian (2011). From Commons to Lord's, Volume Two: 1751 to 1770. Leicester: Martin Wilson. ISBN 978-09-56906-60-1.
- Waghorn, H. T. (1899). Cricket Scores, Notes, &c. From 1730–1773. Edinburgh: Blackwood. OCLC 1086375331.
- Waghorn, H. T. (2005) [1906]. The Dawn of Cricket. London: J. W. McKenzie. ISBN 978-09-47821-17-3.
