= 1761 to 1765 in sports =

Events in world sport through the years 1761 to 1765.

== Boxing ==
Events

- 2 March 1761 — English champion Bill "the "Nailer" Stevens defended his title against George Meggs in London. Meggs won after 17 minutes, but Stevens was suspected of throwing the fight and fell into disgrace.
- July 1762 — In his first defence of the title, Meggs lost to George Millsom. The bout was held at Calne, in Wiltshire, Millsom winning after 40 minutes.
- 10 August 1762 — Millsom successfully defended the title in a return bout against Meggs at Lansdown, in Somerset.
- 1763 — Millsom defeated Parfit Meggs (brother of George) at Beckhampton (now part of Avebury, Wiltshire).
- 1763 — It is believed that Millsom had other fights in this period besides the one against Parfit Meggs and remained unbeaten until 22 or 27 August 1765, but details have not been found.
- 20 June 1764 — Bill Darts defeated Parfit Meggs, who was the brother of George Meggs at Shepton Mallet.
- 20 June 1764 — Harry Sellers defeated Parfit Meggs at Shepton Mallet.
- 28 June 1764 — Tom Juchau defeated Charles Cohant in a 47 to 50 minute fight, depending on source at Guildford.
- 22 or 27 August 1765, depending on source — Millsom lost the English Championship to Tom Juchau at St Albans in a fight lasting 1 hour & 10 minutes.
- 1765—1768 — Peter Corcoran defeated a number of fighters and was considered and believed to be the Irish Champion.

== Cricket ==
Events

- 29 June 1761 — death of George Smith at The Castle in Marlborough; he was formerly the keeper of the Artillery Ground and the landlord of the adjoining Pyed Horse in Chiswell Street, Finsbury.
- 7 July 1761 — the Leeds Intelligencer (now the Yorkshire Post) announced a game to be played at Chapeltown the following Thursday (9 July); it is the earliest known game in the Leeds area.
- 1762–63 — signs of recovery as the Seven Years' War neared its end; Chertsey Cricket Club is prominent in the sources.
- 30 July 1763 — Death of Edmund Chapman of Chertsey in his 69th year, so he was born in either 1694 or 1695; an eminent master bricklayer and "accounted one of the most dextrous cricket players in England".
- 1763 — Two inter-county matches between Middlesex and Surrey were both convincingly won by Middlesex.
- 1764 — earliest mention of some of the most notable Hambledon players including John Small and Richard Nyren.
- c.1765 — Hambledon Club probably founded about this time, based on a former parish organisation.
- 1765 — increasing evidence of the growth of cricket in the north of England as Leeds played Sheffield.

== Football ==
- 1762 - The first game of the Alnwick Shrovetide Football Match, also known as Scoring the Hales, is played in Alnwick, Northumberland, between the parishes of St Michael and St Paul.

== Sources ==
- Buckley, G. B. (1935). Fresh Light on 18th Century Cricket. Cotterell.
