= Coxheath Common =

Cricket venue in Kent, England

Coxheath Common cricket ground
- Interactive map of Coxheath Common cricket ground
- Location: Coxheath, Kent
- Coordinates: 51.230°N 0.513°E
- Establishment: by 1728
- Last used: 1789

Coxheath Common at Coxheath in Kent was used as a cricket venue for several known important matches between 1728 and 1789 as well as for a number of minor matches.

The venue is first referenced in 1646, in the records of a court case following a cricket match played there on 29 May. The case concerned non-payment of a wager that was made at the game. The participants included members of the local gentry. The match has the added interest of being an "odds" game in that Samuel Filmer and Thomas Harlackenden played as a pair, and won, against four men from Maidstone: Walter Franklyn, Richard Marsh, Robert Sanders and William Cooper.

The earliest known important match on the common was in 1728 when Edwin Stead's Kent played against Sussex, organised by Charles Lennox, 2nd Duke of Richmond. Further matches on the common were recorded in 1736 and 1744. By the middle of the 18th century, the heath was being used as a military training ground and it was not recorded as being used for cricket again until 1787 when it seems that a "new ground" had been established near the former Star Inn.

The location of the original ground (1728 to 1744) is unknown, but the Star Inn was located just inside Linton Park close to the crossroads of the modern A229 road and the B2163, and that ground was probably adjacent to the inn. A total of five matches were played at the Star Inn ground from 1787 to 1789. The last known match was in August 1789 between teams from West Kent and East Kent. Following the Napoleonic Wars, the heath was no longer needed by the military and was enclosed. The modern village is a relatively recent development.
