= Alan Brodrick, 2nd Viscount Midleton =

British aristocrat and cricket patron (1702–1747)

Alan Brodrick, 2nd Viscount Midleton (31 January 1702 – 8 June 1747) was a British peer. Before succeeding to his title, he was a significant cricket patron who was jointly responsible for creating the sport's earliest known written rules.

== Cricket patronage ==
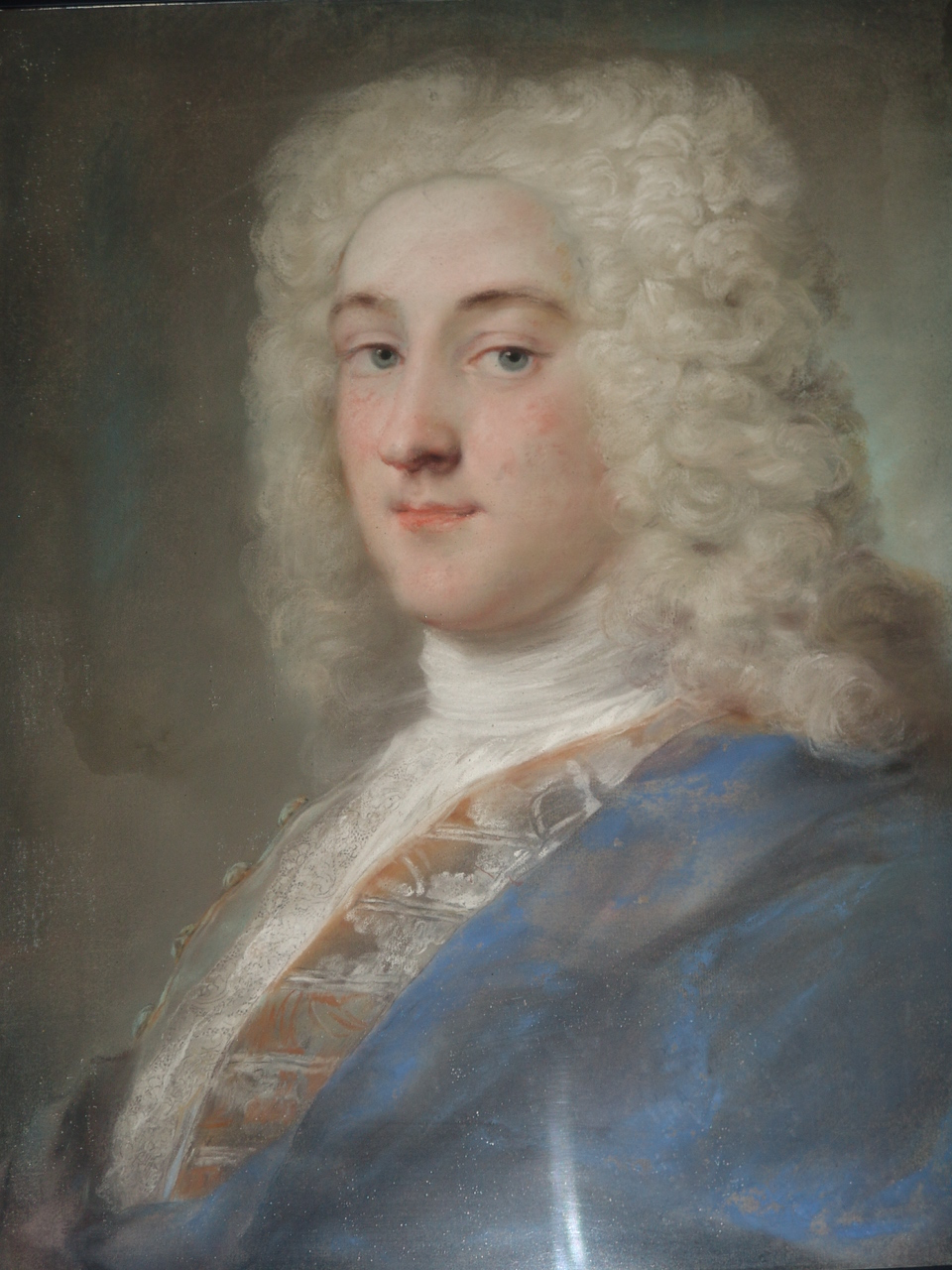
Alan Brodrick, c. 1730

Brodrick succeeded his father Alan Brodrick, 1st Viscount Midleton to the viscountcy on 29 August 1728. Prior to his succession, he had made his mark as a cricket patron by arranging historically important matches against his friend Charles Lennox, 2nd Duke of Richmond.

Records have survived of two such games that took place in the 1727 season. They are highly significant because Richmond and Brodrick drew up Articles of Agreement beforehand to determine the rules that must apply in their contests. These were itemised in sixteen points. It is believed that this was the first time that rules (or some part of the rules, as in this case) were formally agreed, although rules as such definitely existed. The first full codification of the Laws of Cricket was done in 1744. In early times, the rules would be agreed orally, but subject to local variations; this syndrome was also evident in football until the FA was founded, especially re the question of handling the ball. Essentially, the articles of agreement were around residential qualifications, and ensuring that there was no dissent by any player other than the two captains.

One of Brodrick's matches against Richmond is believed to have been held at Peper Harow, the family seat of the Brodrick family, which is near Godalming. A local club still plays there, and it is the location of a point-to-point racecourse.

== Viscountcy and family ==
Brodrick was the son of Alan Brodrick, 1st Viscount Midleton and his wife Lucy (née Courthope), who died in 1703. His succession was unexpected since his elder half-brother St John Brodrick (died 1728) died only a few months before their father. He married Lady Mary Capel, daughter of Algernon Capell, 2nd Earl of Essex and Lady Mary Bentinck, on 7 May 1729.

The 2nd Viscount was a Commissioner of the Customs and subsequently Joint Comptroller of British Army accounts. He in turn was succeeded by his son George as 3rd Viscount. The title is extant (in 2026), and held by Alan Henry Brodrick, 12th Viscount Midleton (b. 1949).

== Bibliography ==
- Birley, Derek (1999). A Social History of English Cricket. London: Aurum Press. ISBN 978-18-54107-10-7 – via Internet Archive.
- Marshall, John (1961). The Duke Who Was Cricket. London: Frederick Muller Ltd. OCLC 11214571.
- McCann, Tim (2004). Sussex Cricket in the Eighteenth Century (PDF). Vol. 88. Lewes: West Sussex Record Office. ISBN 978-08-54450-55-8.

Peerage of Ireland
Preceded by Alan Brodrick	Viscount Midleton; 1728–1747	Succeeded by George Brodrick
