= Articles of Agreement (cricket) =

First formally agreed rules in cricket

References to English cricket matches in the 1727 season between the 2nd Duke of Richmond and Mr Alan Brodrick mention that they drew up Articles of Agreement between them to determine the rules that must apply in their contests. This may be the first time that rules were formally agreed, although rules as such definitely existed. In early times, the rules would be agreed orally and subject to local variations.

== The Articles ==
Articles of Agreement by and between his Grace the Duke of Richmond & Mr. Brodrick for two Cricket Matches concluded the Eleventh of July 1727:

- Imprimis 'Tis by the aforesaid Parties agreed that the first Match shall be played some day of this Instant July in the county of Surry (sic); the Place to be named by Mr Brodrick; the second match to be played in August next in the County of Sussex, the Place to be named by the Duke of Richmond.
- 2d: That the wickets shall be pitched in a fair & even place, at twenty three yards distance from each other.
- 3d: A Ball caught, cloathed or not cloathed, the Striker is out.
- 4th: When a Ball is caught out, the Stroke counts nothing.
- 5th: Catching out behind the Wicket allowed.
- 6th: That 'tis lawfull (sic) for the Duke of Richmond to choose any Gamesters, who have played in either of His Grace's two last Matches with Sir William Gage; and that 'tis lawfull (sic) for Mr. Brodrick to choose any Gamesters within three Miles of Pepperhara, provided they actually lived there last Lady Day.
- 7th: that twelve Gamesters shall play on each side.
- 8th: that the Duke of Richmond & Mr. Brodrick shall determine the Ball or Balls to be played with.
- 9th: if any of the Gamesters shall be taken lame or sick after the Match is begun, their Place may be supplied by any one chose conformably to the sixth Article, or in Case that can not be done, the other side shall be obliged to leave out one of their Gamesters, whomsoever They please.
- 10th: that each match shall be for twelve Guineas of each Side; between the Duke & Mr. Brodrick.
- 11th: that there shall be one Umpire of each side; & that if any of the Gamesters shall speak or give of their opinion, on any Point of the Game, they are to be turned out, & Voided in the Match; this not to extend to the Duke of Richmond & Mr. Brodrick.
- 12th: If any Doubt or Dispute arises on any of the aforemd (sic) Articles, or whatever else is not settled therein, it shall be determined by the Duke of Richmond & Mr. Brodrick on their Honours; by whom the Umpires are likewise to be determined on any Difference between Them.
- 13th: The Duke of Richmond's umpire shall pitch the Wickets when they play in Sussex; & Mr. Brodrick's when they play in Surry (sic); and each of Them shall be obliged to conform Himself strictly to the Agreements contained in the second Article.
- 14th: The Batt (sic) Men for every one they count are to touch the Umpires Stick.
- 15th: that it shall not be lawfull (sic) to fling down the Wicket: & that no Player shall be deemed out by any Wicket put down, unless with the Ball in Hand.
- 16th: that both the Matches shall be played upon, and determined by, these Articles.

The Articles were signed "Richmond" and "A. Brodrick".

== Comparison with 1744 Laws of Cricket ==
Comparison of the Articles to the Laws of 1744, which were widely adopted at that time, reveal that:

- Twelve-a-side, though this may include an umpire apiece, would have been difficult for Richmond if his matches against Gage were eleven-a-side and he fielded the same team in both matches.
- The pitch length of 23 yards may be an error in the original document, since the chain (22 yards) was definitely used as a unit of measure in 1727.
- No run-outs were allowed unless the fielder had the ball in his hand when breaking the wicket.
- Runs were only completed if the batsman touched the umpire's stick (which was probably a bat).
- There is no mention of batsmen not being allowed to hit the ball twice.

In Harry Altham's history, he discusses the possibility of a so-called "popping hole" being in use in the early 18th century but disclaims it as "a local and transitory variety of the regulation game". Altham pointed out, as evidence, that the fielder had to have the ball in his hand when breaking the wicket.

Derek Birley in his social history comments upon the significance of Lady Day in the articles as "the usual hiring day for new servants", given that Richmond and Brodrick had servants in their teams. One of Richmond's regular players was Thomas Waymark whom he ostensibly employed as a groom.

Rowland Bowen in his history comments on the 23-yard pitch length and says the 1744 Laws "expressly refer to twenty-two yards".

== Original document ==
In Tim McCann's Sussex Cricket, the original handwritten articles document is pictured in one of the plates. It is sourced to the West Sussex Record Office (WSRO) re a Goodwood House manuscript which the WSRO acquired in 1884.

== Bibliography ==
- Altham, H. S.; Swanton, E. W. (1962). A History of Cricket, Volume 1 (to 1914) (5th ed.). London: George Allen & Unwin. OCLC 894274808.
- Birley, Derek (1999). A Social History of English Cricket. London: Aurum Press. ISBN 978-18-54107-10-7 – via Internet Archive.
- Bowen, Rowland (1970). Cricket: A History of its Growth and Development. London: Eyre & Spottiswoode. ISBN 978-04-13278-60-9.
- Maun, Ian (2009). From Commons to Lord's, Volume One: 1700 to 1750. Cambridge: Roger Heavens. ISBN 978-19-00592-52-9.
- McCann, Tim (2004). Sussex Cricket in the Eighteenth Century (PDF). Vol. 88. Lewes: West Sussex Record Office. ISBN 978-08-54450-55-8.
