= César-François de Saussure =

Swiss travel writer (1705–1783)

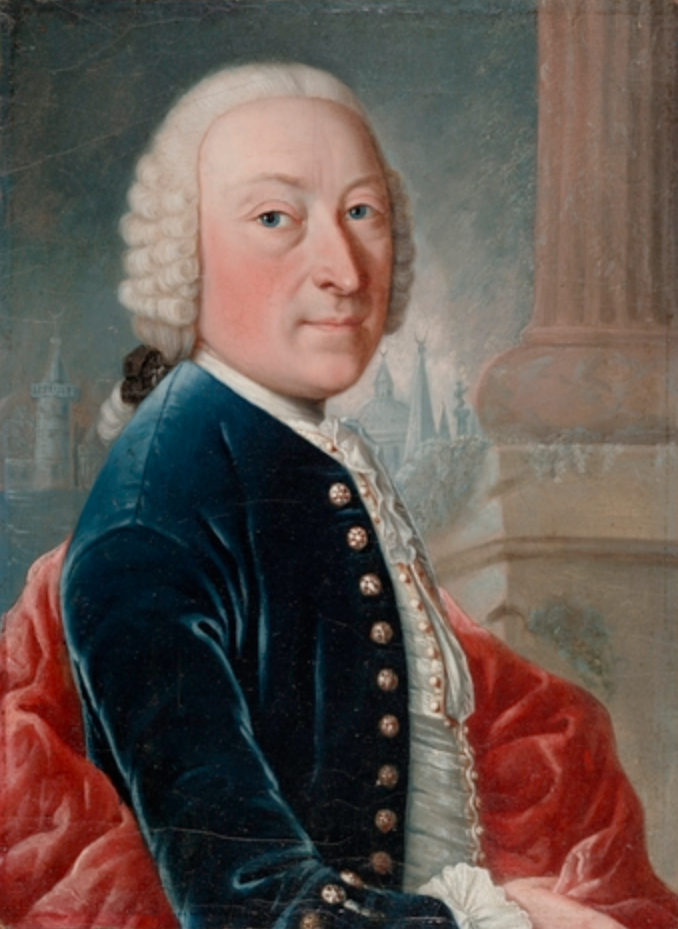
Portrait by Joseph Lander, 1758

César-François de Saussure (bap. 24 June 1705 – 8 March 1783) was a Swiss travel writer.

== Biography ==
Saussure was born in Lausanne, Vaud, Switzerland, the eldest son of François-Louis de Saussure, a minister of the Reformed Church, and Jeanne Emilie "Elisabeth" Gaudard. He was a member of the prominent Saussure family. After the death of his father in 1724, Saussure went travelling for fifteen years. He arrived in London on 24 May 1725, staying there until October 1729.

Nicknamed "the Turk" (le Turc), Saussure lived in Constantinople from 1729 to 1732, where he worked as a secretary to George Hay, 8th Earl of Kinnoull, the British ambassador to the Ottoman Empire. From 1732 to 1735 he was in Rodosto (now Tekirdağ, Turkey), on the Sea of Marmara, in the service of the exiled Prince of Transylvania Francis II Rákóczi. Saussure travelled to London once more in 1738 and joined a masonic lodge the following year. He returned to Lausanne in 1740. Back in Switzerland, Saussure devoted himself to writing accounts of his travels, his memoirs, as well as historical works, and served in multiple public offices in his hometown, including that of métral. He died in Lausanne on 8 March 1783.

Saussure's travelogues were not published for over a century, when they were edited by two of his descendants. Henri de Saussure (1708-1761), a younger brother of César de Saussure, emigrated from Lausanne to the English colony of South Carolina around 1730. Between them, the brothers maintained a correspondence for nearly 30 years. Largely unpublished, the surviving letters between César and his brother in America are now in university-affiliated archives in Lausanne and Geneva.

== Works ==
- Anne van Muyden-Baird (ed.), A Foreign View of England in the Reigns of George I and George II (1902; repr. 1995). A newer translation, by Paul Scott, appeared in 2006 under the title Letters from London, 1725-1730 (2006).
- Berthold van Muyden (ed.), Lettres et voyages de Monsr César de Saussure en Allemagne, en Hollande et en Angleterre (Lausanne, Paris, and Amsterdam, 1903).
