= Edmund Chapman (cricketer) =

English cricketer (c.1695–1763)

Personal information
- Full name: Edmund Chapman
- Born: c.1695
- Died: 30 July 1763; Chertsey, Surrey
- Batting: unknown hand
- Bowling: underarm: unknown hand and type
- Role: player

Domestic team information
- Years: Team
- c.1715–c.1735: Chertsey Cricket Club
- c.1715–c.1735: Surrey
- Source: H. T. Waghorn, 2 March 2026

Edmund Chapman (c.1695 – 20 July 1763) was an early English cricketer who was reported to have been one of the best in England. Given his age, he must have been active from the 1710s to, perhaps, the 1730s. As he was resident in Chertsey, it is reasonable to assume he played for the local Chertsey Cricket Club, and also, perhaps for Surrey. Chapman played at a time when underarm bowling prevailed, but his handedness and styles are unknown. (Note: Note that surviving match records to 1825 are incomplete and any statistical compilation of a player's career in that period is based on known data. Match scorecards were not always created, or have been lost, and the matches themselves were not always recorded in the press or other media. Scorecard data was not comprehensive: e.g., bowling analyses lacked balls bowled and runs conceded; bowlers were not credited with wickets when the batsman was caught or stumped; in many matches, the means of dismissal were omitted.)

== Career ==
Chapman is one of the earliest cricketers whose name has survived in 18th century records. In 1763, a newspaper report announced his death at Chertsey in his 69th year—therefore, he was born c. 1695—and said of him that he was "an eminent master bricklayer" and "accounted one of the most dextrous cricket players in England". The report added that his mother was "then living at the same place, in her 103rd year". There are no known references to Chapman earlier than his obituary notice but, given his age, he must have been an active player from the 1710s until perhaps the 1730s, presumably playing for Chertsey, and perhaps for Surrey as his county team.

With the exception of William Bedle, Chapman is cricket's earliest known accomplished player. Like Bedle, he is renowned solely for his expertise as a player. Few details of cricket matches in the 17th and early 18th centuries have survived, and so what is known about Chapman's career, as with Bedle, has been pieced together by historical analysis as contemporary newspaper reports rarely mentioned a player by name. The reason for this lack of surviving data is that freedom of the press was not allowed in England until 1696, around the time of Chapman's birth, and the infant newspaper industry gradually introduced coverage of sporting events, though for many years their emphasis was on betting rather than on the matches themselves. During the period of Bedle's and Chapman's careers, cricket reports were not only brief but few and far between.

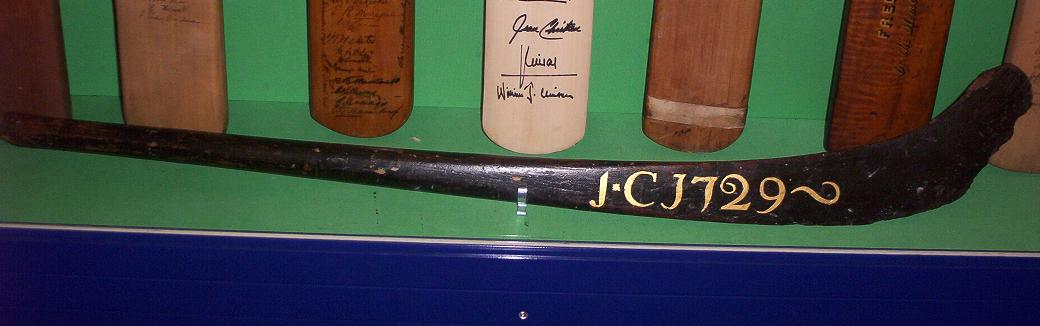
A surviving example of the type of bat that was in use during Chapman's career.

Even without written record of his exploits, the reputation of players like Bedle and Chapman were known, and shared by a public that was growing increasingly interested in cricket. As Bowen comments in his history, it is significant that these players were remembered some thirty to forty years after their careers ended.

Chapman used a bat that was shaped like a modern hockey stick, this being the ideal shape for addressing a ball that was "trundled" or "skimmed" along the ground, as in lawn bowls, and given that he was "a most dextrous player", he was effective in the timing and variety of his strokes. Bowlers in the 18th century used the underarm style exclusively, but at varying pace, and it is unknown if Chapman was a bowler at all, fast or slow. The ball was either rolled along the ground or, if a fast bowler, skimmed across the surface; pitching was not introduced until about 1760.

== Bibliography ==
- Birley, Derek (1999). A Social History of English Cricket. London: Aurum Press. ISBN 978-18-54107-10-7 – via Internet Archive.
- Bowen, Rowland (1970). Cricket: A History of its Growth and Development. London: Eyre & Spottiswoode. ISBN 978-04-13278-60-9.
- Maun, Ian (2009). From Commons to Lord's, Volume One: 1700 to 1750. Cambridge: Roger Heavens. ISBN 978-19-00592-52-9.
- Waghorn, H. T. (2005) [1906]. The Dawn of Cricket. London: J. W. McKenzie. ISBN 978-09-47821-17-3.
