= John Marshall (cricket writer) =

Cricket writer

John Marshall (date of birth unknown) wrote a noted biography of Charles Lennox, 2nd Duke of Richmond entitled The Duke Who Was Cricket. Much of the book focused on Richmond's career as a patron of Sussex cricket. The book was published in 1961 by Frederick Muller Ltd.

== Bibliography ==
- Marshall, John (1961). The Duke Who Was Cricket. London: Frederick Muller Ltd. OCLC 11214571.
