= Edwin Stead =

English cricketer (1701–1735)

Personal information
- Born: 1701; Harrietsham, Kent, England
- Died: 28 August 1735; London, England
- Source: CricInfo, 31 May 2008

Edwin Stead (1701 – 28 August 1735) was a patron of English cricket, particularly of Kent and his own Edwin Stead's XI in the 1720s and early 1730s. He usually captained his teams, but nothing is known about his ability as a player. He was born at Harrietsham in Kent, and died in London.

== Cricket career ==
Stead, a landowner, was a compulsive gambler who frequently bet on the outcome of cricket matches. Like other patrons, he sought to improve his chances of winning by underwriting select XIs, usually made up of players from several Kent parishess; these were therefore of, or near enough, county strength. Dartford Cricket Club, which featured William Bedle, had arguably the best parish team in the game at the time, and it is certain that Stead used several Dartford players in his teams, of which he was also the captain.

Edwin Stead's XI is recorded in several historically important matches from 1724 to 1731. His first known match was probably at Chingford in 1724, and it became the subject of a court case after the Chingford team refused to play to a finish when Kent had the advantage. The court, presided over by Lord Chief Justice Pratt, ruled that the match must be played out so that all wagers could be fulfilled. The match resumed and was completed at Dartford Brent on 5 September 1726, though that may not have been the original venue. A week earlier, on 29 August 1726, Kent had played a London & Surrey combine on Kennington Common for 25 guineas, but the result is unknown.

Stead was a strong rival to the two noted Sussex patrons, Sir William Gage and the 2nd Duke of Richmond. He was very successful in 1728 when the report of a game in August said of Kent's latest victory: "the third time this summer that the Kentish men have been too expert for those of Sussex". But Stead was less successful on 28 August the following year when Gage's XI defeated Kent at Penshurst Park, apparently by an innings victory. There was a return match in September, possibly at or near Lewes, but the result is unknown.

Stead was active in single wicket cricket which became popular during his lifetime. He led a Kent in three four-a-side matches in 1730. The sources record that "a considerable wager" was at stake in the decider, which Kent lost.

The last definite mentions of Stead in a cricket context are in the 1730s concerning his presence at certain matches, although Kent remained prominent in the records for the last five years of his life. Stead's last known involvement in a match was on Saturday, 26 June 1731 when he led Kent against Sunbury on Sunbury Common, a game which the home team won.

== Personal life and early death ==
Baptised at Hollingbourne on 11 March 1702, he was the son of Dutton Stead (died 1719) and his wife Alicia Culpeper (died 1710), and the grandson of Sir Edwin Stead (died 1695), who had been knighted by King Charles II. On 29 March 1719, he married Elizabeth Hamilton at Harrietsham, but there is no record of any children.

Stead inherited the family estate when he was still only eighteen, and became a compulsive gambler, being a keen player of dice and cards in addition to cricket, but John Marshall's summary is that "he is said to have lost heavily at all". John Major wrote that Stead lived the "proverbial short life but a merry one". His recklessness caused him financial difficulties in 1723 and he was obliged to mortgage some of his land to settle his debts. Stead was, nevertheless, a "graceful loser", and Major asserts that "his nonchalance" gained him powerful friends including Frederick, Prince of Wales.

Stead's death on 28 August 1735 was reported in the Grub Street Journal on 4 September 1735. The report says there were two accounts of his death: one that he died "near Charing Cross"; the other that he died "in Scotland Yard". He was buried at the church of St Martin-in-the-Fields on 31 August 1735, with his will being proved at the Prerogative Court of Canterbury on 1 January 1736.

== Bibliography ==
- Altham, H. S.; Swanton, E. W. (1962). A History of Cricket, Volume 1 (to 1914) (5th ed.). London: George Allen & Unwin. OCLC 894274808.
- Birley, Derek (1999). A Social History of English Cricket. London: Aurum Press. ISBN 978-18-54107-10-7 – via Internet Archive.
- Buckley, G. B. (1935). Fresh Light on 18th Century Cricket. Birmingham: Cotterell & Co. OCLC 23450280.
- Major, John (2007). More Than A Game. London: HarperCollins. ISBN 978-00-07183-64-7 – via Internet Archive.
- Marshall, John (1961). The Duke Who Was Cricket. London: Frederick Muller Ltd. OCLC 11214571.
- Maun, Ian (2009). From Commons to Lord's, Volume One: 1700 to 1750. Cambridge: Roger Heavens. ISBN 978-19-00592-52-9.
- McCann, Tim (2004). Sussex Cricket in the Eighteenth Century (PDF). Vol. 88. Lewes: West Sussex Record Office. ISBN 978-08-54450-55-8.
- Underdown, David (2000). Start of Play. Westminster: Allen Lane. ISBN 978-07-13993-30-1 – via Internet Archive.
- Waghorn, H. T. (1899). Cricket Scores, Notes, &c. From 1730–1773. Edinburgh: Blackwood. OCLC 1086375331.
- Waghorn, H. T. (2005) [1906]. The Dawn of Cricket. London: J. W. McKenzie. ISBN 978-09-47821-17-3.
- Wilson, Martin (2005). An Index to Waghorn. London: Bodyline Books (limited edition, by subscription only). [ISBN unspecified]
