= Sussex county cricket team (pre-1839) =

Historical English cricket team

Sussex
Team information
- Established: 17th century
- Last match: 1838
- Home venue: Royal New Ground; Royal Brunswick Ground

History
- Notable players: Thomas Waymark; Richard Newland; Edward Aburrow Sr; Jem Broadbridge; William Lillywhite

Until 1838, the Sussex county cricket team, always known as Sussex, was organised by individual patrons and other groups, particularly by Charles Lennox, 2nd Duke of Richmond, in the first half of the 18th century, and by Brighton Cricket Club in the second half. The team played historically important matches (Note: Any match listed in the ACS' Important Match Guide (1981) is historically important, and therefore of the highest standard, whether or not a scorecard might exist. The same applies to numerous matches discovered by researchers since 1981. For further information, see First-class cricket.) from the early 18th century until the formation of Sussex County Cricket Club on 1 March 1839.

== 17th century ==
The first definite mention of cricket in Sussex relates to ecclesiastical court records in 1611 which state that two parishioners of Sidlesham in West Sussex failed to attend church on Easter Sunday because they were playing cricket. They were fined 12 pence each and made to do penance. A number of such cases were heard in Sussex during the 17th century and there were two instances of players dying, both in Sussex, after being struck on the head during a match.

Despite these problems, cricket became established in Sussex during the 17th century and the earliest village matches took place before the English Civil War. It is believed that county teams were formed in the aftermath of the Restoration in 1660. Roy Webber, in his Phoenix History, states that "the period between 1650 and 1700 seems to be that in which the game took a real grip, and it would seem that cricket was centred mainly in the counties of Kent, Sussex and Hampshire". In 1697, the earliest "great match" recorded was for 50 guineas apiece between two elevens at a venue in Sussex.

== 18th century ==
=== Richmond and Gage ===
Matches involving the two leading Sussex patrons Charles Lennox, 2nd Duke of Richmond, and Sir William Gage were first recorded in 1725. The first teams that were nominally representative of Sussex as a county seem to have been assembled in the 1728 season to play against Edwin Stead's Kent. Three matches are known to have been played and all were won by Kent. A contemporary report says after the third match that it was "the third time this summer that the Kent men have been too expert for those of Sussex". In the 1729 season, a team led by Gage is believed to have achieved the sport's earliest known innings victory in a match against Kent. Gage's team was called "Surrey, Sussex & Hampshire" in one account, however, and so was not Sussex per se. In the context of the time, with cricket mostly confined to the south-eastern counties, the combined team was effectively the Rest of England assembled to take on Kent, the strongest county.

=== Slindon ===
From 1741, Richmond patronised the noted Slindon Cricket Club, whose team was probably representative of the county and at one stage was proclaimed to be the best team in England. Slindon's best-known player was Richard Newland, supported by his brothers Adam and John; and by the controversial Edward Aburrow, a good cricketer but a known smuggler.

=== Hambledon connection ===
Despite some periods of decline, Sussex continued to hold top-class/important status throughout the 18th century. It has been suggested by historians that the Hambledon Club represented Sussex as well as Hampshire for inter-county purposes. Several noted Sussex cricketers, including Richard Nyren and Noah Mann, played for Hambledon.

=== Brighton ===
Cricket in the county saw a revival during the Regency period that coincided with the rise of Brighton as a fashionable resort. Brighton Cricket Club became prominent, and played seven matches in which it is said to have been representative of Sussex as a whole.

== 19th century ==
=== Napoleonic Wars ===
Despite a crippling loss of manpower and investment, cricket managed to survive the Napoleonic Wars and much of the credit for keeping the game alive goes to the Brighton club as well as to MCC.

=== Roundarm revolution ===
Brighton's reward was to see Sussex achieve great prominence in the aftermath of the war and it was the Sussex bowlers William Lillywhite and Jem Broadbridge who led the roundarm revolution of the 1820s.

=== Foundation of the county club ===
In 1836, the first steps were taken towards forming a county club. A meeting in Brighton set up a Sussex Cricket Fund to support county matches. It was from this organisation that Sussex County Cricket Club was formally constituted on 1 March 1839.

== Bibliography ==
- ACS (1981). A Guide to Important Cricket Matches Played in the British Isles 1709–1863. Nottingham: ACS. OCLC 85045528.
- ACS (1982). A Guide to First-class Cricket Matches Played in the British Isles. Nottingham: ACS. OCLC 10586869.
- Altham, H. S.; Swanton, E. W. (1962). A History of Cricket, Volume 1 (to 1914) (5th ed.). London: George Allen & Unwin. OCLC 894274808.
- Birley, Derek (1999). A Social History of English Cricket. London: Aurum Press. ISBN 978-18-54107-10-7 – via Internet Archive.
- Bowen, Rowland (1970). Cricket: A History of its Growth and Development. London: Eyre & Spottiswoode. ISBN 978-04-13278-60-9.
- Buckley, G. B. (1935). Fresh Light on 18th Century Cricket. Birmingham: Cotterell & Co. OCLC 23450280.
- Haygarth, Arthur (1997) [1862]. Scores & Biographies, Volume 2 (1827–1840). Kennington: Frederick Lillywhite. ISBN 978-19-00592-23-9.
- Major, John (2007). More Than A Game. London: HarperCollins. ISBN 978-00-07183-64-7 – via Internet Archive.
- Maun, Ian (2009). From Commons to Lord's, Volume One: 1700 to 1750. Cambridge: Roger Heavens. ISBN 978-19-00592-52-9.
- Maun, Ian (2011). From Commons to Lord's, Volume Two: 1751 to 1770. Leicester: Martin Wilson. ISBN 978-09-56906-60-1.
- McCann, Tim (2004). Sussex Cricket in the Eighteenth Century (PDF). Vol. 88. Lewes: West Sussex Record Office. ISBN 978-08-54450-55-8.
- Underdown, David (2000). Start of Play. Westminster: Allen Lane. ISBN 978-07-13993-30-1 – via Internet Archive.
- Waghorn, H. T. (1899). Cricket Scores, Notes, &c. From 1730–1773. Edinburgh: Blackwood. OCLC 1086375331.
- Waghorn, H. T. (2005) [1906]. The Dawn of Cricket. London: J. W. McKenzie. ISBN 978-09-47821-17-3.
- Webber, Roy (1960). The Phoenix History of Cricket. Charing Cross, London: Phoenix House Ltd. OCLC 5391059.
- Wilson, Martin (2005). An Index to Waghorn. London: Bodyline Books (limited edition, by subscription only).
