= Charles Lennox, 2nd Duke of Richmond =

English aristocrat and cricket patron (1701–1750)

Lieutenant-General His Grace The Duke of Richmond KG KB PC FRS
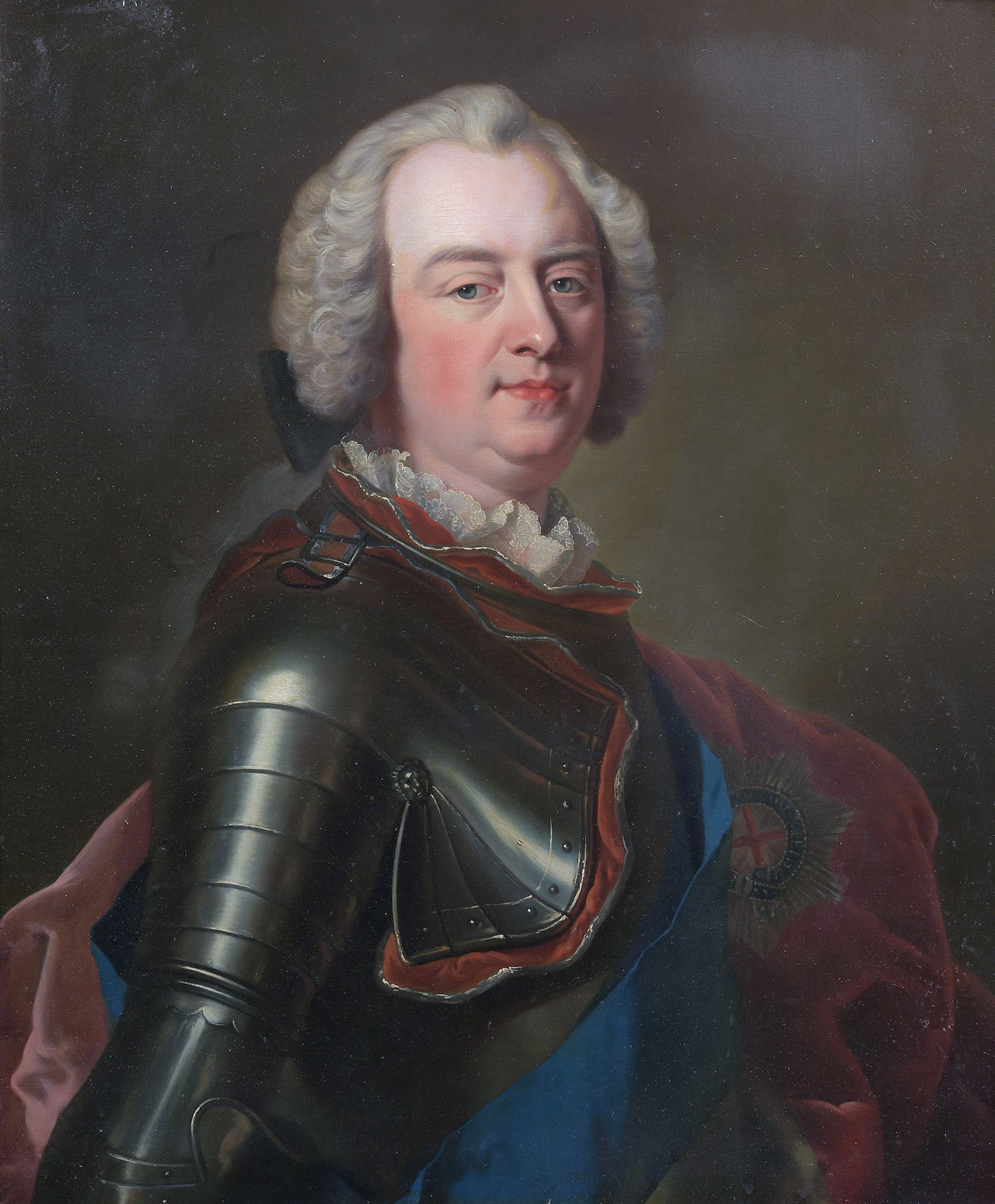
- Tenure: 27 May 1723 – 8 August 1750
- Successor: Charles Lennox, 3rd Duke of Richmond
- Other titles: 2nd Duke of Lennox; 2nd Duke of Aubigny (France); 2nd Earl of March; 2nd Earl of Darnley; 2nd Baron Settrington; 2nd Lord of Torbolton; Hereditary Constable of Inverness Castle
- Born: 18 May 1701; Goodwood, Sussex, England
- Died: 8 August 1750 (aged 49); Godalming, Surrey, England
- Spouse: Hon. Sarah Cadogan (m. 1719)
- Issue among others...: Caroline Fox, 1st Baroness Holland; Emily FitzGerald, Duchess of Leinster; Charles Lennox, 3rd Duke of Richmond; Lord George Lennox; Lady Louisa Conolly; Lady Sarah Napier; Lady Cecilia Lennox
- Parents: Charles Lennox, 1st Duke of Richmond; Anne Brudenell

Charles Lennox, 2nd Duke of Richmond, 2nd Duke of Lennox, 2nd Duke of Aubigny, KG, KB, PC, FRS (18 May 1701 – 8 August 1750), of Goodwood Park near Chichester in Sussex, was a British nobleman and politician. He was the only son of Charles Lennox, 1st Duke of Richmond and Lennox, the youngest of the seven illegitimate sons of King Charles II. He performed distinguished military service for George II during the failed Jacobite uprising of 1745. He held a number of posts in connection with his high offices and raised a large aristocratic family, who made an impact on British political and cultural life. He is also remembered for his patronage of cricket.

== Early life ==
Lennox was styled Earl of March from his birth in 1701 as heir to the dukedom Charles II created for March's father. He also inherited his father's love of sports, particularly cricket. He had a serious accident at the age of 12 when he was thrown from a horse during a hunt, but he recovered and it did not deter him from horsemanship.

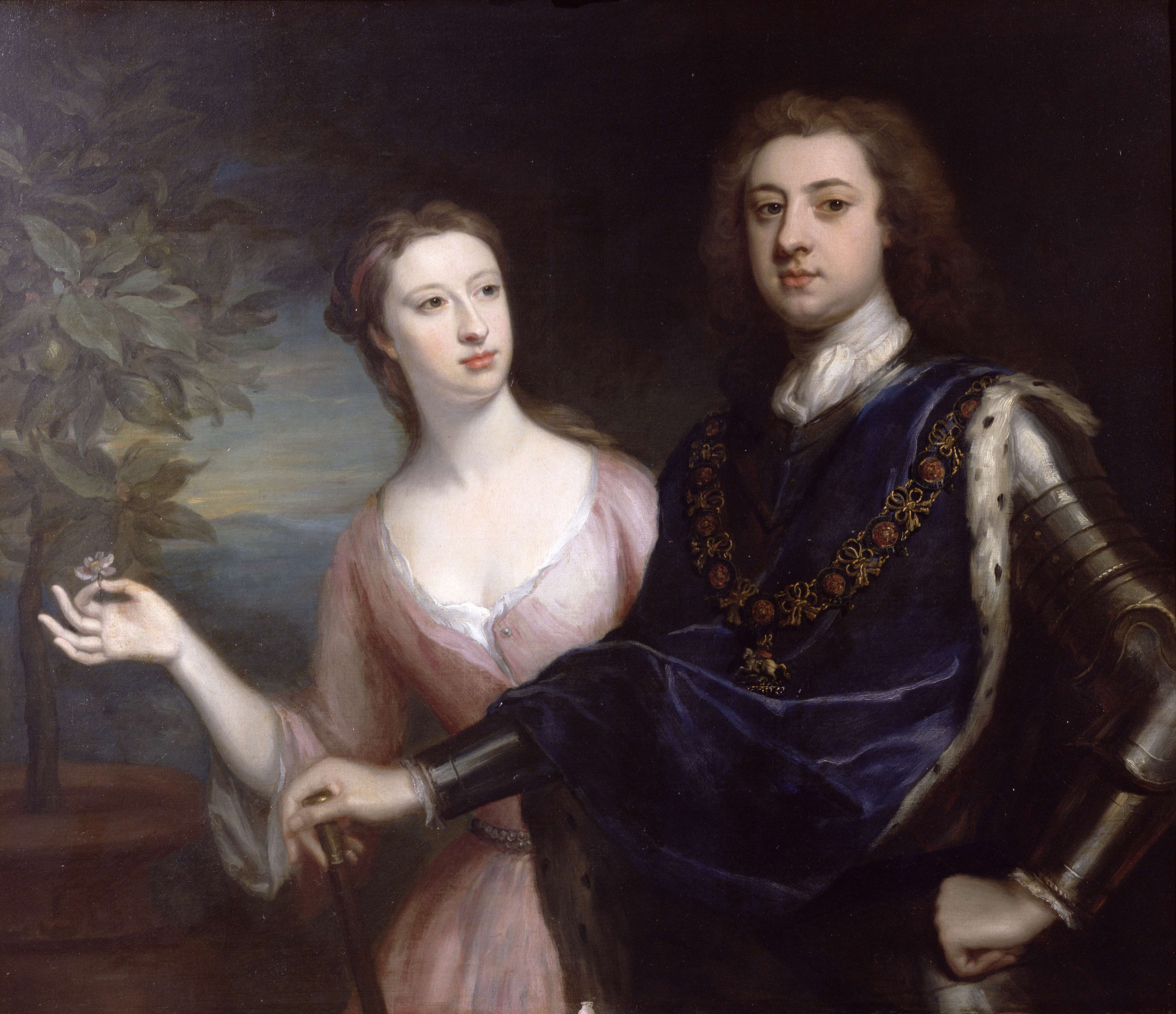
The Duke and Duchess of Richmond

Lord March entered into an arranged marriage in December 1719 when he was 18 and his bride, the Hon. Sarah Cadogan, was just 13, in order to use her large dowry to pay his considerable debts. Dowry and debt were due to a sum won by her father in play against his father. Lord and Lady March were married at The Hague.

In 1722, March became Member of Parliament for Chichester as first member with Sir Thomas Miller as his second. He gave up his seat after his father died in May 1723, when he succeeded to the family's peerage titles of 2nd Duke of Richmond. A feature of Richmond's career was the support he received from his wife Sarah, Duchess of Richmond and Lennox, her interest being evident in surviving letters. Their marriage was a great success, especially by Georgian standards.

Their grandson, who became the 4th Duke is known to cricket history as Colonel the Hon. Charles Lennox, was a noted amateur batsman of the late 18th century. He was one of Thomas Lord's main guarantors when he established his new ground in Marylebone.

== Cricket career ==
=== 2nd Duke of Richmond's XI ===
The Duke has been described as early cricket's greatest patron. Although he had played as a boy, his real involvement began after he succeeded to the dukedom. He captained his own team, and his players included some of the earliest known professionals, such as his groom Thomas Waymark. Later, when he patronised Slindon Cricket Club, Richmond was associated with the Newland brothers. His earliest recorded match is the one against Sir William Gage's XI on 20 July 1725, which is mentioned in a surviving letter from Sir William to the Duke.

Records have survived of four matches played by Richmond's team in the 1727 season. Two were against Gage's XI and two against an XI raised by the Surrey patron Alan Brodrick. These last two games are highly significant because Richmond and Brodrick drew up Articles of Agreement beforehand to determine the rules that must apply in their contests. These were itemised in sixteen points. It is believed that this was the first time that rules (or some part of the rules, as in this case) were formally agreed upon, although rules as such definitely existed. The first full codification of the Laws of Cricket was done in 1744. In early times, the rules would be agreed upon orally, and were subject to local variations; this syndrome was also evident in football until the FA was founded, especially regarding the question of handling the ball. Essentially, the Articles of Agreement focused on residential qualifications, and ensuring that there was no dissent by any player other than the two captains.

In 1728, Richmond's Sussex played twice against Edwin Stead's Kent, and lost both matches.A contemporary source stated that: "(Kent's) men have been too expert for those of Sussex". In 1730, Richmond's XI played two matches against Gage's XI, and another match against Surrey, who were backed by a Mr Andrews of Sunbury-on-Thames. Richmond lost to Andrews. The second of his matches against Gage, due to be played at The Dripping Pan, near Lewes, was "put off on account of Waymark, the Duke's man, being ill".

In 1731, Richmond was involved in one of the most controversial matches recorded in the early history of cricket. On 16 August, Sussex played Middlesex, who were backed by Thomas Chambers, at an unspecified venue in Chichester. Middlesex won this match, which had a prize of 100 guineas, and a return was arranged to take place at Richmond Green on 23 August. The return match was played for 200 guineas, and it is notable as the earliest match of which the team scores are known: Richmond's XI 79, Chambers' XI 119; Richmond's XI 72, Chambers' XI 23–5 (approx.). The game ended promptly at a pre-agreed time although Chambers' XI with "four or five more to have come in" and needing "about 8 to 10 notches" clearly had the upper hand. The result caused a fracas among the crowd on Richmond Green. They were incensed by the prompt finish because the Duke of Richmond had arrived late, and had delayed the start of the game. The riot resulted in some of the Sussex players "having the shirts torn off their backs", and it was said "a law suit would commence about the play". In a note about another match involving Chambers' XI in September, G. B. Buckley recorded that Richmond may have conceded the result to Chambers, presumably to stop the threat of litigation.

Richmond is not mentioned in cricket sources again for ten years. He may have stepped aside after the 1731 fracas, but it is more likely that he terminated the Duke of Richmond's XI after he broke his leg in 1733, and could no longer play himself. Instead, he channelled his enthusiasm for cricket through a team from the small village of Slindon, which bordered on his Goodwood estate.

=== Slindon ===
The rise to fame of Slindon Cricket Club was based on the play of Richard Newland and the patronage of Richmond. On Thursday, 9 July 1741, in a letter to her husband, the Duchess of Richmond mentions a conversation with John Newland regarding a Slindon v East Dean match at Long Down, near Eartham, a week earlier. This is the earliest recorded mention of any of the Newland family. Then, on 28 July, Richmond sent two letters to the Duke of Newcastle to tell him about a game that day which had resulted in a brawl with "hearty blows" and "broken heads". The game was at Portslade between Slindon, who won, and unnamed opponents.

On Monday 7 September 1741, Slindon played Surrey at Merrow Down, near Guildford. Richmond, in a letter to the Duke of Newcastle before the game, spoke of "poor little Slyndon against almost your whole county of Surrey". Next day he wrote again, saying that "wee (sic) have beat Surrey almost in one innings".

The Duchess wrote to him on Wednesday 9 September and said she "wish'd..... that the Sussex mobb (sic) had thrash'd the Surrey mob". She had "a grudge to those fellows ever since they mob'd you" (apparently a reference to the Richmond Green fiasco in August 1731). She then said she wished the Duke "had won more of their moneys". In 1744, Richmond created what is now the world's oldest known scorecard for the match between London and Slindon at the Artillery Ground on 2 June. Slindon won by 55 runs and the original scorecard is now among Richmond's papers in the possession of the West Sussex Records Office.

In August 1745, Richmond backed Sussex against Surrey in a match at Berry Hill, near Arundel. It appears that Surrey won the game in view of a comment made by Lord John Sackville in a letter to Richmond dated Saturday 14 September: "I wish you had let Ridgeway play instead of your stopper behind it might have turned the match in our favour".

=== Single wicket ===
When single wicket became the dominant form of cricket in the late 1740s, Richmond entered a number of teams mostly centred on Stephen Dingate, who was in his employ at the time. For example, a number of matches were played by a "threes" team of Dingate, Joseph Rudd and Pye. Richmond often found himself opposed by his former groom Thomas Waymark, still an outstanding player but now resident in Berkshire.

Richmond died on 8 August 1750. He had been arguably the greatest of the game's early patrons, particularly of the Slindon club, and of Sussex cricket in general. His death was followed by a slump in the fortunes of Sussex cricket, which featured few matches of significance until the rise of Brighton Cricket Club in the 1790s.

== Career in the peerage ==
Richmond held many titles, including the Order of the Garter (KG), Order of the Bath (KB), Privy Counsellor (PC) and Fellow of the Royal Society (FRS). In 1734 he succeeded to the title of Duke of Aubigny in France on the death of his grandmother Louise de Kérouaille, Duchess of Portsmouth.

He served as Lord of the Bedchamber to King George II from 1727 and, in 1735, he was appointed Master of the Horse.

== Freemasonry ==
He was admitted a Fellow of the Royal Society in 1724. He followed his father, the 1st Duke, into freemasonry and was a Grand Master of the Premier Grand Lodge of England in 1724, a few years after its formation in 1717. His father had been a Master Mason in Chichester in 1696–1697. As Duke of Aubigny, he also assisted in introducing Freemasonry into France. In 1734, he created a masonic lodge in the Chateau d'Aubigny near Metz in northeast France. One year later, with another past Grand Master, John Theophilus Desaguliers, he assisted in inaugurating a lodge in the hotel at Rue Bussy, in Paris.

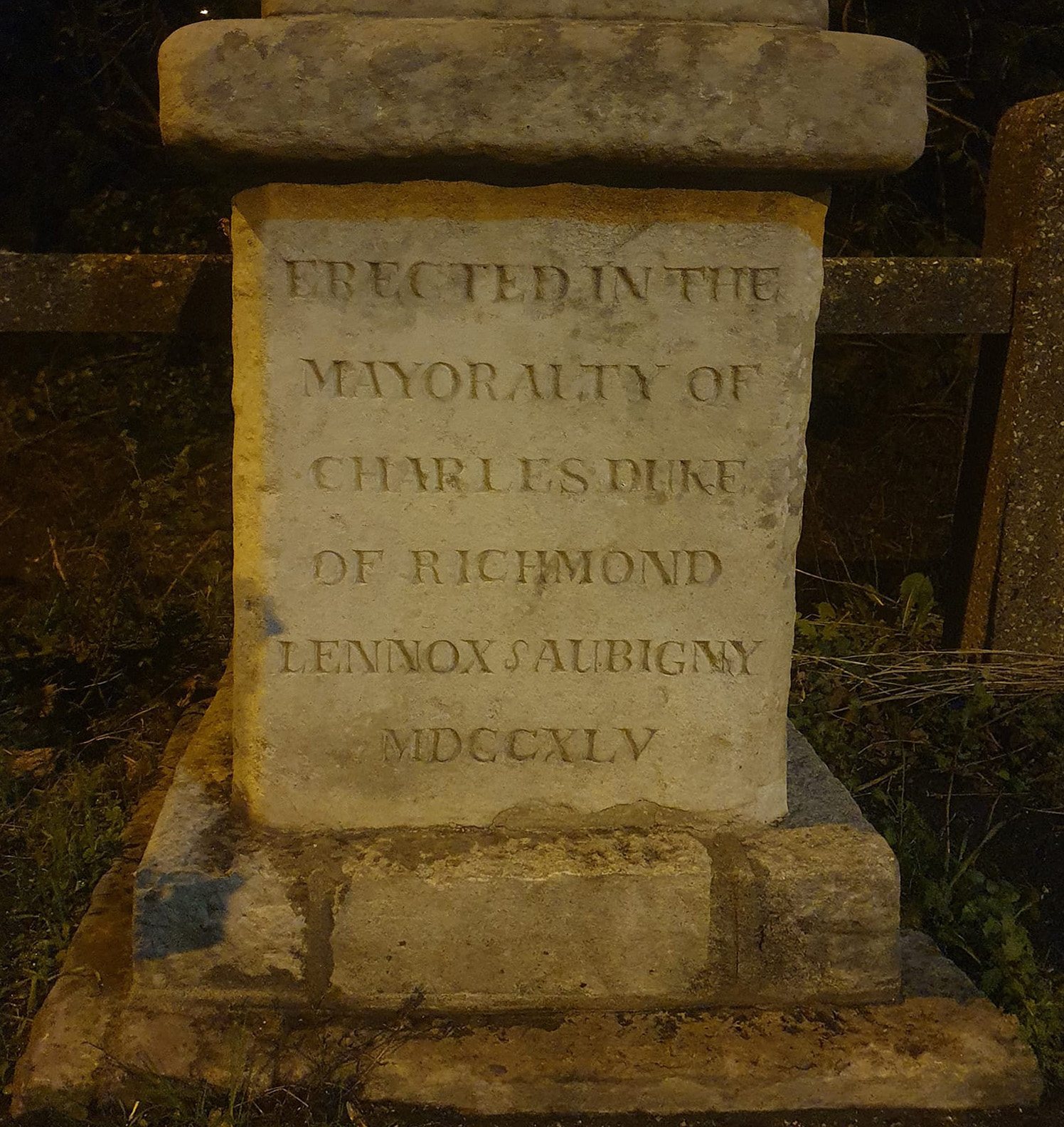
Base of commemorative obelisk erected in Chichester with inscription for the Duke's mayoralty and his part in the Jacobite uprising

== Civic roles ==
He was elected Mayor of Chichester for 1735–36.

Richmond was one of the founding Governors of London's Foundling Hospital, which received its Royal Charter from George II in 1739. The Foundling Hospital was a charity dedicated to saving London's abandoned children. Both the Duke and the Duchess took great interest in the project. The Duke attended committee meetings and both took part in the baptism and naming of the first children accepted by the hospital in March 1741.

== Military career ==
Richmond was a lieutenant-general in the British Army and served under the notorious Duke of Cumberland in the Hanoverian campaign against the Jacobite rising of 1745.

== Smuggling ==
The 1740s was a turbulent time for Sussex. There was a rise in smuggling gangs; of these probably, the most violent was the notorious Hawkhurst Gang.

The gang were responsible for the brutal murder of a bootmaker and a customs official. Richmond decided to pursue those responsible with a vengeance. He began by petitioning the authorities so that a special assize could be held at Chichester. He did not trust the local Justices (in West Sussex), as they could not be relied on to convict smugglers. He, therefore, obtained authorisation for judges to be brought down from London. The judges (Sir Thomas Birch, Sir Michael Foster and Baron Clive) made their way under guard to Goodwood, where Richmond entertained them before the trial. His campaign against the gang may have been because it was feared that the smugglers were assisting the Jacobites by providing intelligence to the French.

All the culprits involved in the murder of the two men were captured and convicted.

The duke's love of cricket was probably only eclipsed by his enthusiasm for wiping out smuggling in Sussex. During Richmond's two-year campaign, against the illegal trade, thirty-five smugglers were executed and another ten died in jail before they could be hanged. However, although his campaign managed to reduce the incidence of smuggling, it was reported by the writer Horace Walpole, in 1752 (after Richmond's death) that Sussex was "stiff" with smugglers.

== Marriage and children ==
Richmond married Lady Sarah Cadogan (1705–1751), daughter of William Cadogan, 1st Earl Cadogan, on 4 December 1719 at The Hague, Netherlands. They had twelve children, including a firstborn son, Charles, who died in infancy, and a surviving son, also named Charles, who inherited the titles. The twelve are:

- Lady Georgiana Carolina Lennox (27 March 1723 – 24 July 1774), married Henry Fox, 1st Baron Holland, and had issue.
- Lord Charles Lennox (3 September 1724 – 1724), Earl of March.
- Lady Louisa Margaret Lennox (15 November 1725 – May 1728).
- Lady Anne Lennox (27 May 1726 – 1727).
- Lord Charles Lennox (9 September 1730 – November 1730), Earl of March.
- Lady Emilia Mary Lennox (6 October 1731 – 27 March 1814), married first James FitzGerald, 1st Duke of Leinster, and had issue; and secondly William Ogilvie and had issue.
- Charles Lennox, 3rd Duke of Richmond (22 February 1735 – 29 December 1806).
- Lord George Lennox (29 November 1737 – 25 March 1805), General, father of Charles Lennox, 4th Duke of Richmond.
- Lady Margaret Lennox (16 November 1739 – 10 January 1741).
- Lady Louisa Augusta Lennox (24 November 1743 – 1821), married Thomas Connolly but had no issue.
- Lady Sarah Lennox (14 February 1745 – August 1826), married first Sir Charles Bunbury, 6th Baronet, and had issue (although not by her husband, but by Lord William Gordon); and secondly George Napier by whom she had issue.
- Lady Cecilia Lennox (28 February 1750 – 21 November 1769), unmarried.

Richmond's interment was at Chichester Cathedral. His wife Sarah survived him by only one year.

== Arms ==
Coat of arms of Charles Lennox, 2nd Duke of Richmond
Coronet A Coronet of a Duke Crest On a chapeau Gules turned up Ermine a lion statant guardant Or crowned with a Ducal Coronet Gules and gorged with a Collar compony of four pieces Argent and Gules charged with two roses of the last; (Richmond crest with Lennox collar and coronet). Escutcheon The Royal Arms of King Charles II of England (viz. quarterly: 1st and 4th, France and England quarterly; 2nd, Scotland; 3rd, Ireland); the whole within a Bordure compony Argent charged with Roses Gules barbed and seeded proper and the last. Supporters Dexter: A unicorn Argent armed, crined and unguled Or, gorged with a Collar company as the crest. Sinister: An antelope Argent, also armed, crined and unguled Or, gorged with a Collar company as the crest. Motto En la rose je fleuris (French: "Like the rose, I flourish")

== In popular culture ==
In the TV miniseries Aristocrats (1999), the 2nd Duke is played by Julian Fellowes.

== Bibliography ==
- Altham, H. S.; Swanton, E. W. (1962). A History of Cricket, Volume 1 (to 1914) (5th ed.). London: George Allen & Unwin. OCLC 894274808.
- Carpenter, Audrey T. (2011). John Theophilus Desaguliers: A Natural Philosopher, Engineer and Freemason in Newtonian England. Continuum. ISBN 978-08-26431-48-6.
- Birley, Derek (1999). A Social History of English Cricket. London: Aurum Press. ISBN 978-18-54107-10-7 – via Internet Archive.
- Buckley, G. B. (1935). Fresh Light on 18th Century Cricket. Birmingham: Cotterell & Co. OCLC 23450280.
- Chichester City Council (2022). "List of Mayors" (PDF). Chichester City Council.
- Green, Ken (2002). Chichester: An Illustrated History. Derby: Breedon Books. ISBN 978-18-59833-36-0.
- Horowski, Leonhard (2017). Das Europa der Könige: Macht und Spiel an den Höfen des 17. und 18. Jahrhunderts (in German). Rowohlt Verlag GmbH. ISBN 978-34-98028-35-0.
- Ingamells, John (2009). National Portrait Gallery Later Stuart Portraits, 1685-1714. London: National Portrait Gallery. ISBN 978-18-55144-10-1.
- Marshall, John (1961). The Duke Who Was Cricket. London: Frederick Muller Ltd. OCLC 11214571.
- McCann, Tim (2004). Sussex Cricket in the Eighteenth Century (PDF). Vol. 88. Lewes: West Sussex Record Office. ISBN 978-08-54450-55-8.
- McLynn, Frank (1989). Crime and Punishment in Eighteenth Century England. Abingdon, Oxon: Routledge. ISBN 978-04-15010-14-6.
- McNeill, Ronald John (1911). "Richmond, Earls and Dukes of" . In Chisholm, Hugh (ed.). Encyclopædia Britannica. Vol. 23 (11th ed.). Cambridge University Press.
- Seccombe, Thomas (1885). Lennox, Charles (1701–1750) . Dictionary of National Biography, 1885–1900. Vol. 33 – via Wikisource.
- Underdown, David (2000). Start of Play. Westminster: Allen Lane. ISBN 978-07-13993-30-1 – via Internet Archive.
- Waghorn, H. T. (2005) [1906]. The Dawn of Cricket. London: J. W. McKenzie. ISBN 978-09-47821-17-3.
- Waugh, Mary (1985). Smuggling in Kent and Sussex, 1700-1840. Newbury, Berkshire: Countryside Books. ISBN 978-09-05392-48-6.

Parliament of Great Britain
Preceded by Sir Thomas Miller; Henry Kelsall	Member of Parliament for Chichester; 1722–1723; With: Sir Thomas Miller	Succeeded by Sir Thomas Miller; Lord William Beauclerk
Military offices
Preceded by The Duke of Somerset	Colonel of the Royal Horse Guards; 1750	Vacant Title next held by Sir John Ligonier
Masonic offices
Preceded by The Duke of Buccleuch	Grand Master of the Premier; Grand Lodge of England; 1724–1725	Succeeded by Lord Paisley
Political offices
Preceded by The Earl of Scarbrough	Master of the Horse; 1735–1750	Succeeded by Vacant
Peerage of England
Preceded by Charles Lennox	Duke of Richmond; 3rd creation 1723–1750	Succeeded by Charles Lennox
Peerage of Scotland
Preceded by Charles Lennox	Duke of Lennox; 2nd creation 1723–1750	Succeeded by Charles Lennox
French nobility
Preceded by Charles Lennox	Duke of Aubigny; 1723–1734	Succeeded by Charles Lennox
