= Derek Birley =

English sportswriter

Sir Derek Sydney Birley (31 May 1926 – 14 May 2002) was a distinguished English educationalist and a prize-winning writer on the social history of sport, particularly cricket.

== Life and career ==
Born in a mining community in West Yorkshire, Birley attended Hemsworth Grammar School, Hemsworth, West Yorkshire. A fervent English patriot and anti-fascist, he enlisted in the Royal Artillery from school in 1944, hoping to contribute to active service in the South-East Asian front. He was quickly transferred to the Intelligence Corps to be trained in Russian and Chinese, and sent to the Russian sector in Berlin, where he served from 1944 to 1947 as a Russian interpreter.

On his return to England, he was awarded an ex-serviceman's scholarship to Queens' College, Cambridge, to read English. In 1951, he was joint winner with J. G. Ballard of a short story competition held by Varsity, the Cambridge student newspaper.

After university he joined the teaching staff of Queen Elizabeth Grammar School, Wakefield, where he taught English between 1952 and 1955. He left the school to become an administrator in the Leeds Education Authority. He continued his career in education administration, rising to become deputy director of Education in Liverpool in 1964. He wrote a number of books on management of education in this period. He became involved in Anthony Crosland's consultations about higher education, from which the vision of polytechnics emerged. In 1970, he moved to Northern Ireland and took up the post of Rector of what became the first Ulster Polytechnic, and the first polytechnic in the UK – against determined opposition from the then Unionist government – and, following a government merger of higher education, became the founding Vice-Chancellor of the University of Ulster.

When he retired in 1991, he had overseen two decades of massive increases in provision of higher education in Northern Ireland, and equity of representation for Catholic and women students. He was knighted for services to education. His other passion was the social history of sport. In 1979, he wrote The Willow Wand, 'a strikingly original and robustly demythologising book, criticising the pastoral nostalgia of the genre'.

This was voted by a distinguished poll in Wisden Cricketer in July 2010 as the best cricket book of all time. He wrote a three-volume history of sport in Britain in the 1990s which "is unlikely to be surpassed". The second volume won the Aberdare Literary prize in 1995. In 1999, A Social History of English Cricket was named The Cricket Society's Book of the Year and the William Hill Sports Book of the Year.

== Marriage ==
He married Professor Norma Reid in 1990. He had two sons from a previous marriage.

== Books ==
- The Education Officer and His World. London: Routledge & Kegan Paul, 1970.
- An Equal Chance: Equalities and Inequalities of Educational Opportunity (with Anne Dufton). London: Routledge & Kegan Paul, 1971. New edition, London: Routledge, 2017.
- Planning and Education. London: Routledge & Kegan Paul, 1972.
- Opportunities at Sixteen. Belfast: HMSO, 1978.
- The Willow Wand: Some Cricket Myths Explored. London: Queen Anne Press, 1979. New edition, London: Aurum, 2000.
- Sport and the Making of Britain. Manchester: Manchester University Press, 1993.
- Land of Sport and Glory: Sport and British Society, 1887–1910. Manchester: Manchester University Press, 1995.
- Playing the Game: Sport and British Society, 1914–1945. Manchester: Manchester University Press, 1995.
- A Social History of English Cricket. London: Aurum, 1999.

Preceded by Robert Twigger	William Hill Sports Book of the Year winner 1999	Succeeded by Lance Armstrong
Preceded by –	Rector of Ulster College; 1970–1984	Succeeded by –
Preceded by –	Vice-Chancellor of the University of Ulster; 1984–1991	Succeeded by Trevor Arthur Smith, Baron Smith of Clifton
