= Henry Bunbury =

Henry Bunbury may refer to:

- Sir Henry Bunbury, 3rd Baronet (1676–1733), British MP for Chester, Commissioner of the Revenue for Ireland
- Henry Bunbury (caricaturist) (1750–1811), British caricaturist
- Sir Henry Bunbury, 7th Baronet (1778–1860), his son, British lieutenant-general, MP for Suffolk
- Henry William St Pierre Bunbury (1812–1875), British soldier and Australian explorer
- Sir Henry Bunbury (civil servant) (1876–1968), British civil servant
- Sir Henry Charles John Bunbury, 10th Baronet (1855–1930), Royal Navy officer

== See also ==
- Bunbury (disambiguation)
