= London Bridge Is Falling Down =

Nursery rhyme from England

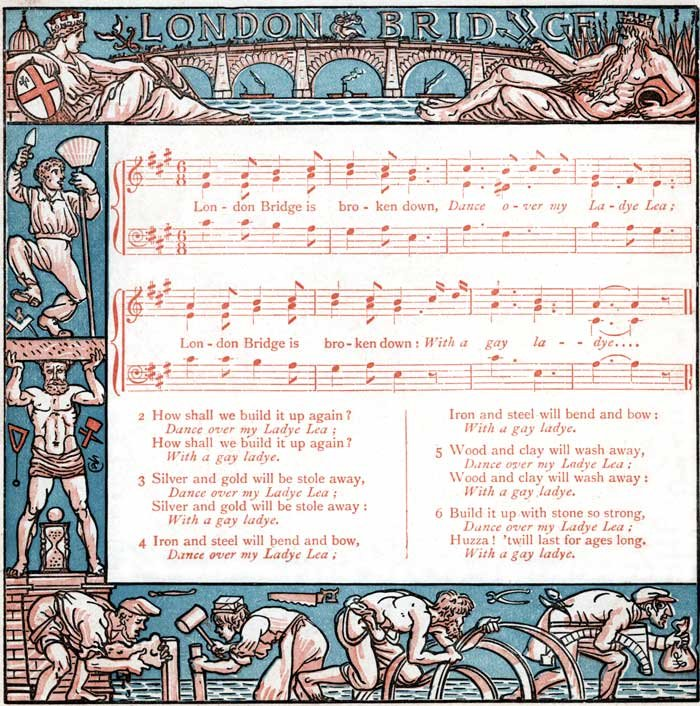
- Illustration from Walter Crane's A Baby's Bouquet (c. 1877)

Nursery rhyme
- Published: c. 1744
- Songwriter: Unknown

"London Bridge Is Falling Down" (also known as "My Fair Lady" or "London Bridge") is a traditional English nursery rhyme, folk music and singing game, which is found in different versions all over the world. It deals with the dilapidation of London Bridge and attempts, realistic or fanciful, to repair it. It may date back to bridge-related rhymes and games of the Late Middle Ages, but the earliest records of the rhyme in English are from the 17th century. The lyrics were first printed in close to their modern form in the mid-18th century and became popular, particularly in Britain and the United States, during the 19th century.

The modern melody was first recorded in the late 19th century. It has the Roud Folk Song Index number 502. Several explanations have been advanced to explain the meaning of the rhyme and the identity of the "fair lady" of the refrain. The song is well known and has been referenced in a variety of works of literature and popular culture.

== Lyrics ==
There is considerable variation in the lyrics of the rhyme. The most frequently used first verse is:

London Bridge is falling down,
Falling down, falling down,
London Bridge is falling down,
My fair lady.

The bridge would then be built with various items, but very few of them kept the bridge standing:

Build it up with Iron Bars,
Iron Bars, Iron Bars,
Build it up with Iron Bars,
My fair lady.

Iron Bars will bend and break,
Bend and break, bend and break,
Iron bars will bend and break,
My fair lady.

Although another version substitutes:

London Bridge is broken down,
Broken down, broken down...

The rhyme is constructed of quatrains in trochaic tetrameter catalectic (each line made up of four metrical feet of two syllables, with the stress falling on the first syllable in a pair; the last foot in the line missing the unstressed syllable), which is common in nursery rhymes. In its most common form it relies on a double repetition, rather than a rhyming scheme, which is a frequently employed device in children's rhymes and stories. The Roud Folk Song Index, which catalogues folk songs and their variations by number, classifies the song as 502.

== Melody ==
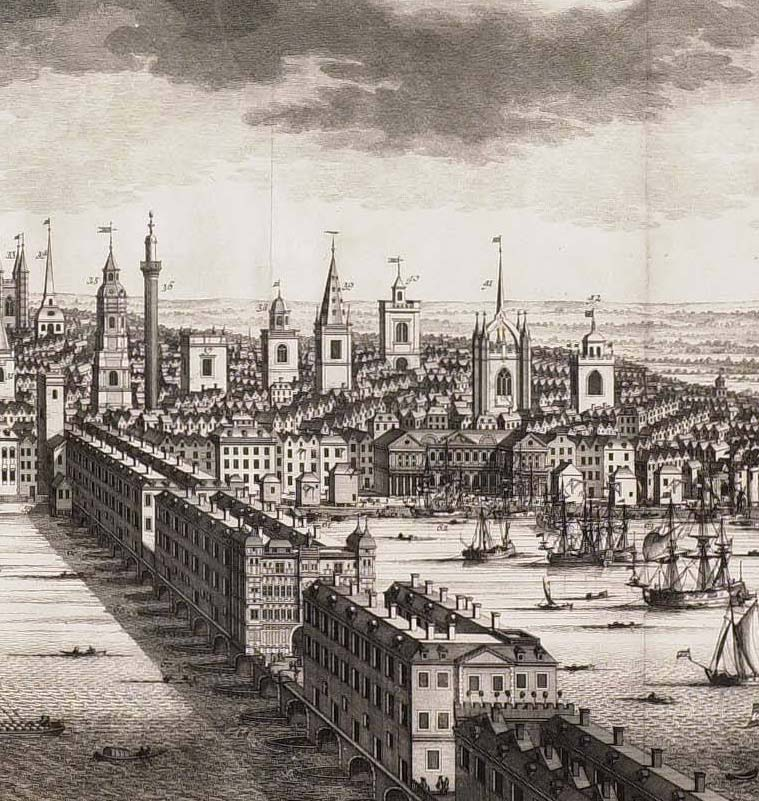
Prospect of Old London Bridge in 1710

A melody is recorded for "London Bridge" in an edition of John Playford's The Dancing Master published in 1718, but it differs from the modern tune recorded above and no lyrics were given. An issue of Blackwood's Magazine in 1821 noted the rhyme as being sung to the tune of "Nancy Dawson", now better known as "Nuts in May," and the same tune was given in Richard Thomson's Chronicles of London Bridge (1827).

Another tune was recorded in Samuel Arnold's Juvenile Amusements in 1797. E.F. Rimbault's Nursery Rhymes (1836) has the same first line, but then a different tune. The tune now associated with the rhyme was first recorded in 1879 in the United States in A.H. Rosewig's Illustrated National Songs and Games.

== The game ==
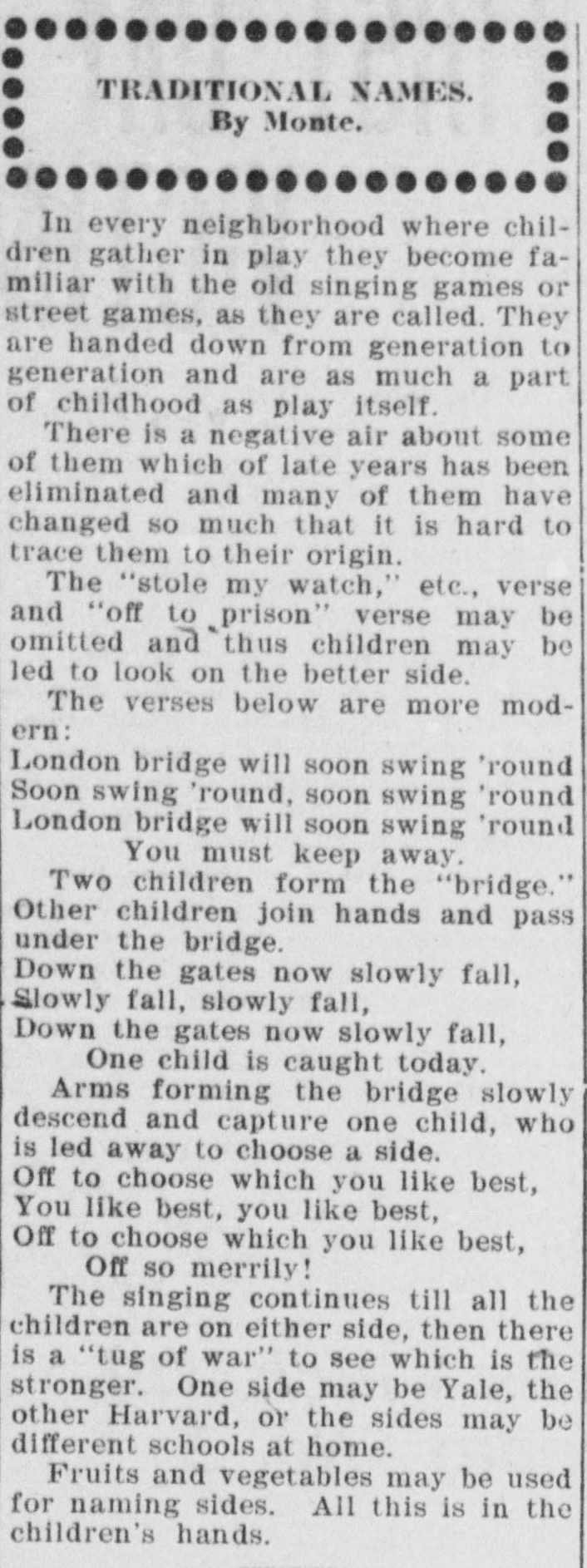
This 1904 column from The Tacoma Times describes various alternative verses and their accompanying gestures

The rhyme is often used in a children's singing game, which exists in a wide variety of forms, with additional verses. Most versions are similar to the actions used in the rhyme "Oranges and Lemons". The most common is that two players hold hands and make an arch with their arms while the others pass through in single file. The "arch" is then lowered at the song's end to "catch" a player. In the United States, it is common for two teams of those that have been caught to engage in a tug of war. In England until the nineteenth century, the song may have been accompanied by a circle dance, but arch games are known to have been common across late medieval Europe.

Five of nine versions published by Alice Gomme in 1894 included references to a prisoner who has stolen a watch and chain. This may be a late 19th century addition from another game called "Hark the Robbers", or "Watch and Chain". This rhyme is sung to the same tune and may be an offshoot of "London Bridge" or the remnant of a distinct game. In one version the first two verses have the lyrics:

Who has stole my watch and chain,
Watch and chain, watch and chain;
Who has stole my watch and chain,
My fair lady?

Off to prison you must go,
You must go, you must go;
Off to prison you must go,
My fair lady.

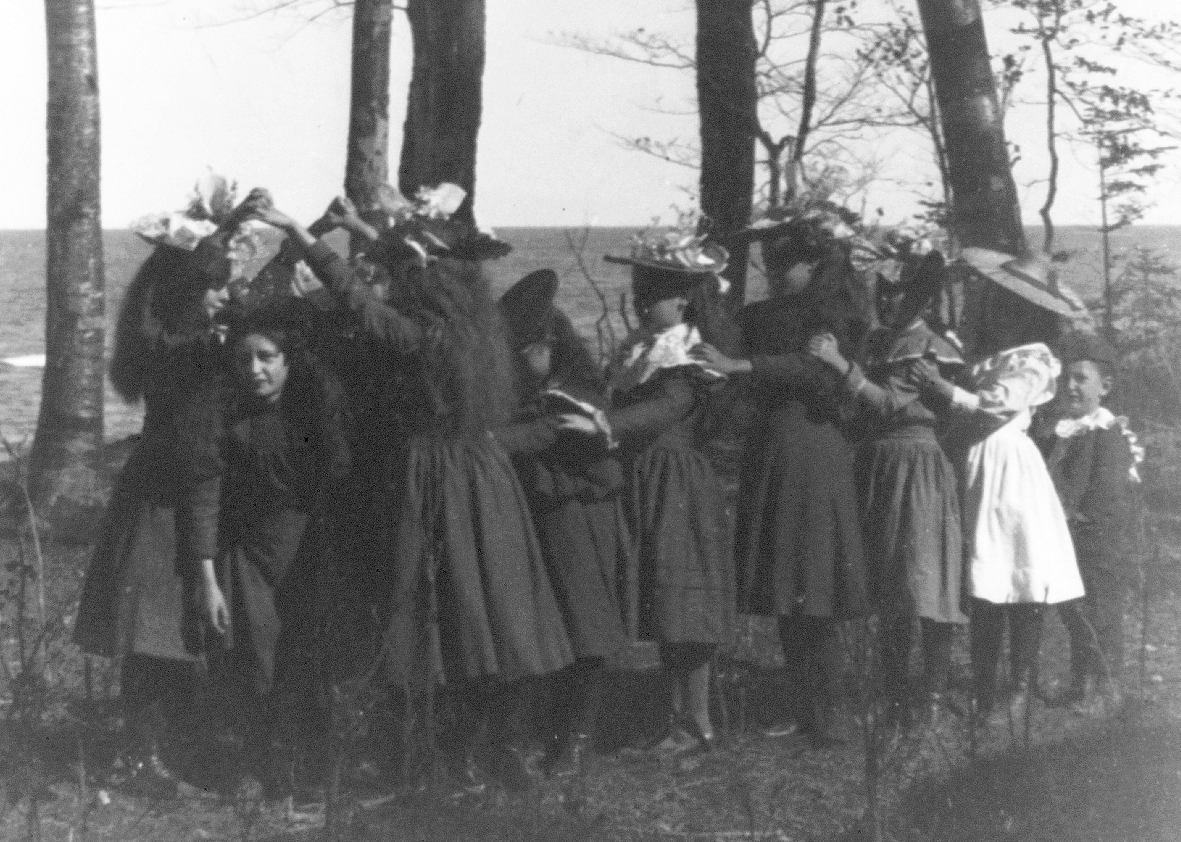
Girls playing "London Bridge" in 1898

== Origins ==
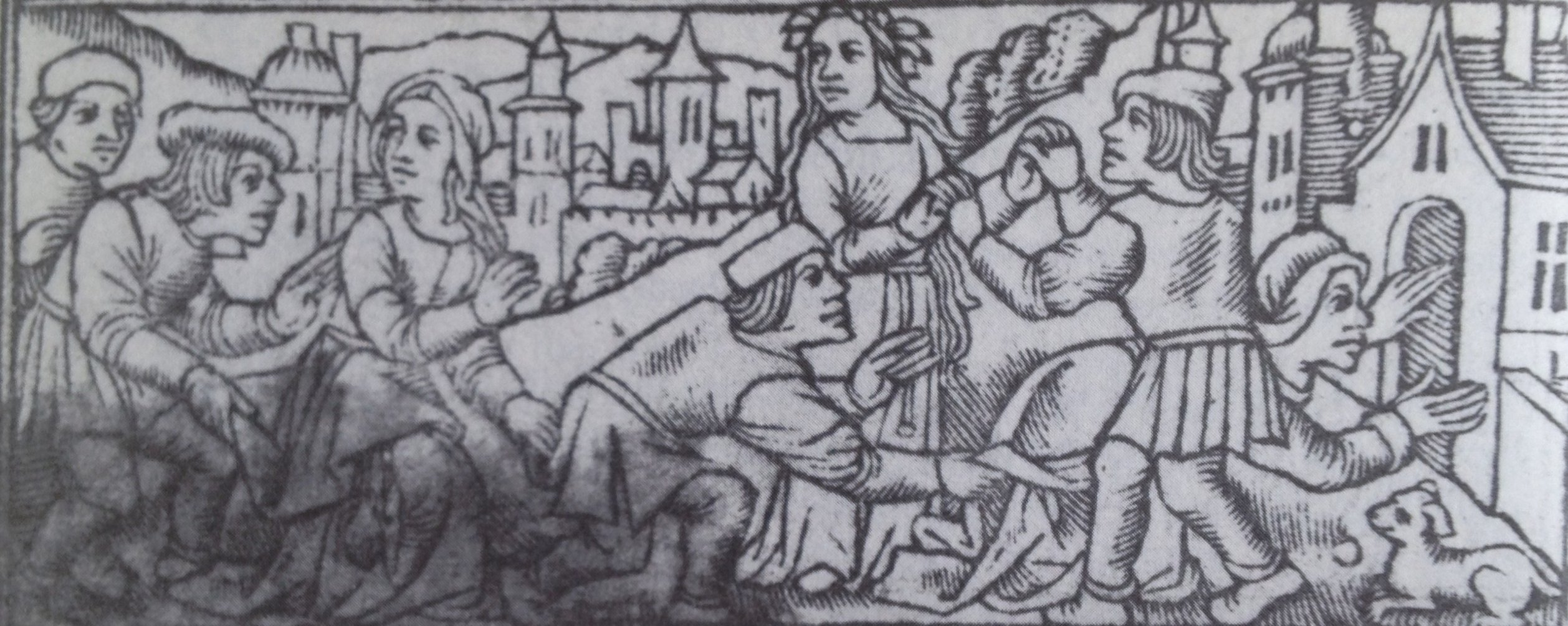
Detail from Philippe Pigouchet's Heures a lusaige de Paris (1497), showing an arch game similar to that known to be associated with the rhyme from the late nineteenth century

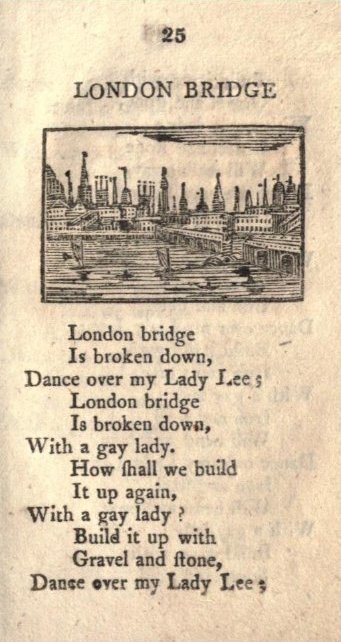
The first page of the rhyme from an 1815 edition of Tommy Thumb's Pretty Song Book (original c. 1744)

Similar rhymes can be found across Europe, pre-dating the records in England. These include "Knippelsbro Går Op og Ned" from Denmark, "Die Magdeburger Brück" from Germany, "Pont chus" from 16th-century France, and "Le porte" from 14th-century Italy. It is possible that the rhyme was acquired from one of these sources and then adapted to fit the most famous bridge in England.

One of the earliest references to the rhyme in English is in the comedy The London Chaunticleres, printed in 1657, but probably written about 1636, in which the dairy woman Curds states that she had "danced the building of London-Bridge" at the Whitsun Ales in her youth, although no words or actions are mentioned. Widespread familiarity with the rhyme is suggested by its use by Henry Carey in his satire Namby Pamby (1725), as:

Namby Pamby is no clown,
London Bridge is broken down:
Now he courts the gay lay-dee
dancing o'er the Lady-Lee.

The oldest extant version could be that recalled by a correspondent to the Gentleman's Magazine in 1823, which he claimed to have heard from a woman who was a child in the reign of Charles II (r. 1660–1685) and had the lyrics:

London Bridge is broken down,
Dance over the Lady Lea;
London Bridge is broken down,
With a gay lay-dee.

The earliest printed English version is in the oldest extant collection of nursery rhymes, Tommy Thumb's Pretty Song Book, printed by John Newbery in London (c. 1744), and has words very close to that. A version from James Ritson's Gammer Gurton's Garland (1784) is also similar but replaces the last verse with:

Build it up with stone so strong,
Dance o'er my Lady Lee,
Huzza! 'twill last for ages long,
with a gay lady.

== Meaning ==
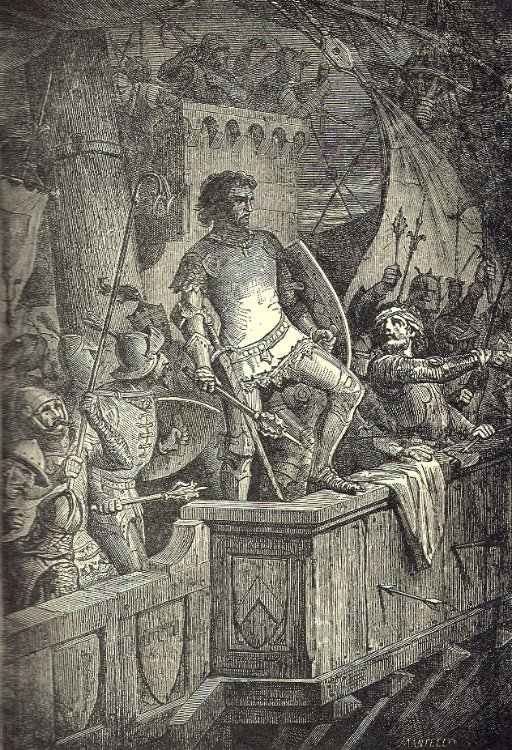
Cnut the Great's men on the London bridge, under attack by Olaf II of Norway from a Victorian children's book published in 1894

The meaning of the rhyme is not certain. It may simply relate to the many difficulties experienced in bridging the River Thames, but a number of alternative explanations have been put forward.

=== Viking attack explanation ===
One hypothesis of origin is that the rhyme relates to the supposed destruction of London Bridge by Olaf II in 1014 (or 1009). The translation of the Norse saga the Heimskringla, published by Samuel Laing in 1844, included a verse by Óttarr svarti, that looks very similar to the nursery rhyme:

London Bridge is broken down. –
Gold is won, and bright renown.
Shields resounding,
War-horns sounding,
Hild is shouting in the din!
Arrows singing,
Mail-coats ringing –
Odin makes our Olaf win!

However, modern translations make it clear that Laing was using the nursery rhyme as a model for his very free translation, and the reference to London Bridge does not appear at the start of the verse and it is unlikely that this is an earlier version of the nursery rhyme. Some historians have raised the possibility that the attack never took place. However, the original document detailing the attack was written only about 100 years after what would be a famous event in a highly populated area, leading the majority of historians to conclude that the account is at least relatively accurate.

=== Child sacrifice/immurement explanation ===
Alice Bertha Gomme put forward the hypothesis that the song refers to the burying, perhaps alive, of children in the foundations of the bridge, a theory later discussed by Iona and Peter Opie. The practice was based on a belief that a bridge would collapse unless the body of a human sacrifice was buried in its foundations, and according to this the watchman is actually a human sacrifice who will then guard the bridge.

=== Age and damage explanation ===
Until the mid-18th century the Old London Bridge was the only crossing on the Thames in London. It was damaged in a major fire in 1633, but in the Great Fire of 1666, this damage acted as a firebreak and prevented the flames from further damaging the bridge and crossing to the south bank of the Thames. With its 19 narrow arches, it impeded river traffic and flow. Central piers were removed to create a wider navigational span. Widening and the removal of its houses was completed in 1763, but it remained relatively narrow and needed continual and expensive repairs. In the early 19th century, it was decided to replace the bridge with a new construction. New London Bridge was opened in 1831 and survived until it was replaced in 1972. At that time, the 1831 bridge was dismantled and reconstructed in Lake Havasu City, Arizona.

=== "Fair lady" identity ===
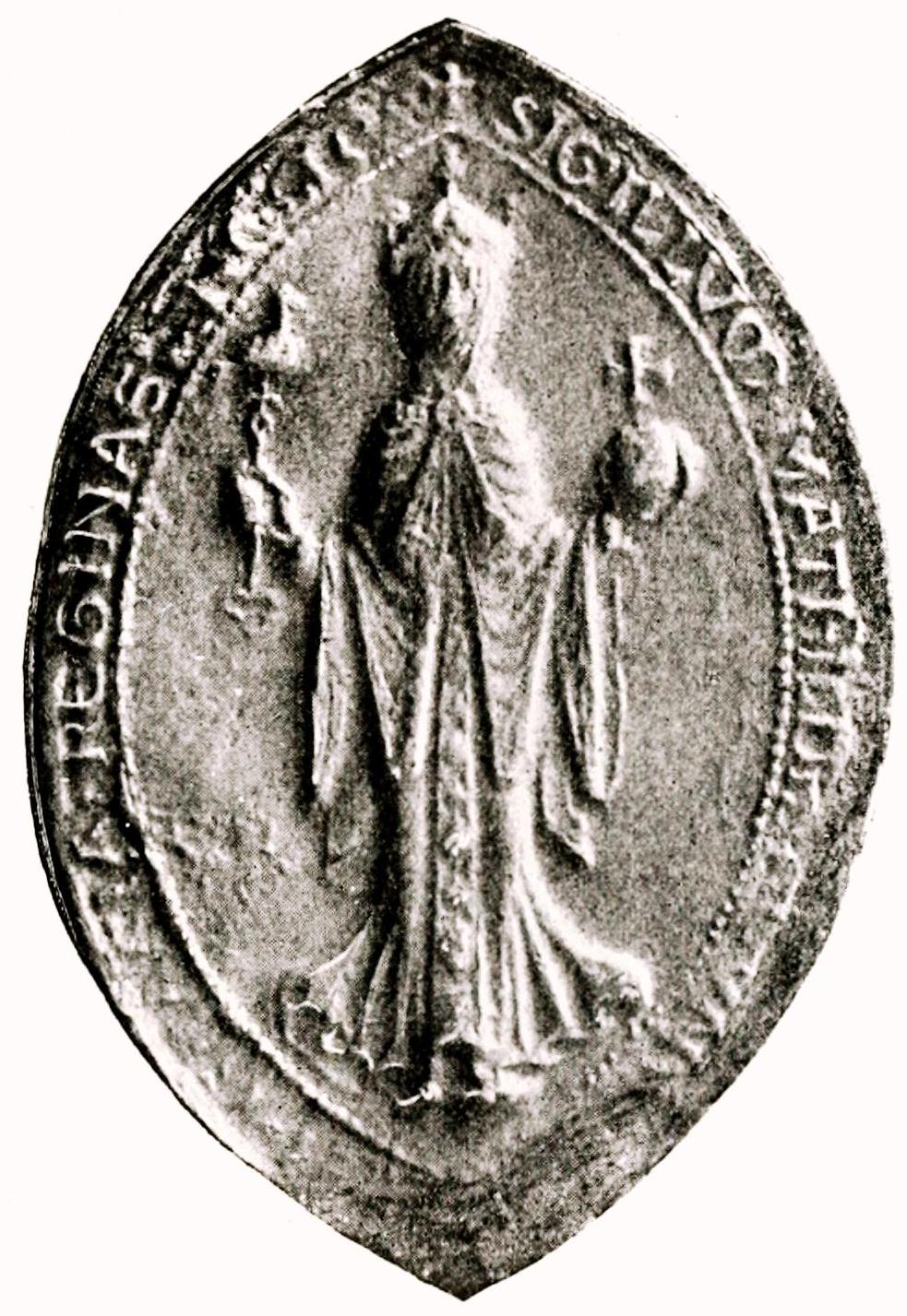
Seal of Matilda of Scotland, one of the candidates for the "fair lady" of the refrain

Several attempts have been made to identify the fair lady, lady gay, or lady lee/lea of the rhyme. They include:

- Virgin Mary: The nursery rhyme could allude to the Virgin Mary as the fair lady. The Viking attack was on 8 September 1009 (or 1014), the traditional feast for the birthday of the Virgin Mary; they burned the bridge but could not take the city, as it was protected by the 'fair lady'.
- Matilda of Scotland (c. 1080–1118): Henry I's consort, who between 1110 and 1118 was responsible for the building of the series of bridges that carried the London–Colchester road across the River Lea and its side streams between Bow and Stratford.
- Eleanor of Provence (c. 1223–1291): Consort of Henry III, who had custody of the bridge revenues from 1269 to about 1281. Eleanor of Provence was also pelted with eggs and stones at London Bridge by mobs as her barge tried passing beneath. This was in response to the political discontent that had been created not only by the king's vast unpopularity at the time, but was also sparked by his son King Edward I's raiding of the Temple.
- A member of the Leigh family of Stoneleigh Park, Warwickshire, who have a family story that a human sacrifice lies under the structure.
- The River Lea, which is a tributary of the Thames.

== Legacy ==
By the late 19th century, the rhyme had become one of the most popular and well known in the English-speaking world. It has also been referenced in both literature and popular culture – appearing, for example, at the climax of T. S. Eliot's The Waste Land (1922). Random verbal echoes also occur in the title of My Fair Lady (1956), the chorus of Brenda Lee's song My Whole World Is Falling Down (1963) and elsewhere, down to its use at the start and end of the 2023 anime show Record of Ragnarok.

== See also ==
- Dong, Dong, Dongdaemun, a similar Korean nursery rhyme
