= Bunbury baronets =

Title in the Baronetage of England

- Escutcheon of the Bunbury baronets of Stanney Hall
- Creation date: 1681
- Created by: Charles II
- Peerage: Peerage of England
- Status: extant
- Motto: Esse quam videri, To be rather than to seem

The Bunbury Baronetcy, of Bunbury, Oxon and Stanney Hall in the County of Chester, is a title in the Baronetage of England.

== History ==
The title was created on 29 June 1681 for Thomas Bunbury, Sheriff of Cheshire from 1673 to 1674 and the member of an ancient Cheshire family. His grandson, Henry, the third Baronet, and great-grandson, the fourth Baronet, both sat as Members of Parliament for Chester. The latter died unmarried at an early age and was succeeded by his younger brother, the fifth Baronet. He was a clergyman. On his death in 1764 the title passed to his eldest son, the sixth Baronet. He represented Suffolk in the House of Commons for over forty years but is best remembered for his marriage to Lady Sarah Lennox.

The sixth baronet died childless in 1821 and was succeeded by his nephew, the seventh Baronet. He was the son of Henry Bunbury, younger son of the fifth Baronet. The seventh Baronet was a distinguished soldier and politician. His eldest son, the eighth Baronet, was High Sheriff of Suffolk in 1868, and Fellow of the Royal Society. He died childless in 1886 and was succeeded by his younger brother, the ninth Baronet. He was Liberal Member of Parliament for Bury St Edmunds. He died unmarried in 1895 and was succeeded by his nephew, the tenth Baronet. He was the son of Colonel Henry William St Pierre Bunbury, third son of the seventh Baronet. He served as High Sheriff of Suffolk in 1908 and was a Deputy Lieutenant of the county. On his death in 1930 the title passed to his son, the eleventh Baronet. He was High Sheriff of Suffolk in 1936 and was a Deputy Lieutenant of the county. His son, the twelfth Baronet, was High Sheriff of Suffolk in 1972. As of 2014 the title was held by the latter's second but eldest surviving son, the thirteenth Baronet, who succeeded in 1985.

== Bunbury baronets, of Stanney Hall (1681) ==
- Sir Thomas Bunbury, 1st Baronet (d. 1682)
- Sir Henry Bunbury, 2nd Baronet (c. 1657–1687)
- Sir Henry Bunbury, 3rd Baronet (1676–1733)
- Sir Charles Bunbury, 4th Baronet (1708–1742)
- Rev Sir William Bunbury, 5th Baronet (c. 1710–1764)
- Sir (Thomas) Charles Bunbury, 6th Baronet (1740–1821)
- Sir Henry Edward Bunbury, 7th Baronet (1778–1860)
- Sir Charles James Fox Bunbury, 8th Baronet (1809–1886)
- Sir Edward Herbert Bunbury, 9th Baronet (1811–1895)
- Sir Henry Charles John Bunbury, 10th Baronet (1855–1930)
- Sir Charles Henry Napier Bunbury, 11th Baronet (1886–1963)
- Sir (John) William Napier Bunbury, 12th Baronet (1915–1985)
- Sir Michael William Bunbury, 13th Baronet (b. 1946)

The heir apparent is the present holder's son Henry Michael Napier Bunbury (b. 1980).

== Extended family ==
Henry Bunbury, younger son of the fifth Baronet and father of the seventh Baronet, was a noted caricaturist. Noël Louis St. Pierre Bunbury (1890–1971), son of Lieutenant-Colonel William St Pierre Bunbury, third son of Colonel Henry William St Pierre Bunbury, third son of the seventh Baronet, was a Brigadier in the Indian Army. Francis Ramsay St Pierre Bunbury (1910–1990), son of Lieutenant-Colonel Gerald Bruce St Pierre Bunbury, son of the aforementioned Lieutenant-Colonel William St Pierre Bunbury, was a Brigadier in the Duke of Wellington's Regiment. Sir Herbert Napier Bunbury (1851–1922), son of Captain Richard Hanmer Bunbury, fourth son of the seventh Baronet, was a Major-General in the Royal Artillery.

== See also ==
- Richardson-Bunbury baronets
