= Kitty Kennedy (courtesan) =

18th-Century London Courtesan

- Satirical portrait of Kittty Kennedy published by Carrington Bowles (British Museum, 1935,0522.2.22 )
- Born: Catherine Kennedy; Circa 1751; London, England
- Died: November 1781 (aged about 30); London, England
- Occupation: Courtesan
- Spouse: Robert Stratford Byram (married 16 August 1773)
- Father: Matthew Kennedy
- Relatives: Patrick Kennedy (brother); Matthew Kennedy (brother)

Catherine ('Kitty') Kennedy (circa 1751–1781), was an 18th-century English courtesan famous for saving her brothers' lives.

Kitty Kennedy is often confused with the courtesan Polly Kennedy (also known as Polly Jones) and with another Polly Kennedy from a decade earlier - the courtesan who shared lodgings with Nancy Dawson in the 1750s.

== Early life ==
Details of Kitty Kennedy's early life are scarce. It is said that her father, Matthew Kennedy, had been born in Ireland and was an auctioneer's clerk in London. It seems that she became a courtesan when she was young and she was the main breadwinner in her family home, on Newman Street in Westminster, by the age of 19.

In 1771, Town and Country Magazine wrote of Kitty Kennedy:

Miss [Kennedy] is now in the prime of life, above the middle size, but very genteel, she is uncommonly fair, has fine expressive eyes, and remarkably beautiful hair. Her former alliances had already made her celebrated in the annals of gallantry; but the era of her present engagement, will probably render her fame more extensive in the juridical and even political world.

Horace Bleakley adds:

'she was a light-hearted Irish girl, winsome and soft of speech, with the " come hither in the eye " that most of her pretty countrywomen appear to possess' and 'she had a fund of naughty sorties, and rejoiced in any joke that contained a double entendre'.

== Fame and scandal ==
Many of Kitty Kennedy's clients were in the circle of the politician and wit George Selwyn and included:

- Frederick, Earl of Carlisle
- James, Earl of Fife
- Henry, Viscount Palmerston
- Henry, Earl of Suffolk
- Lord Robert Spencer (brother of the Duke of Marlborough)
- John St John (brother of Viscount Bolingbroke)

Her most constant supporters were Robert Spencer and John St John. Robert Spencer ('Lord Bob') first encountered Kitty Kennedy at Vauxhall Gardens in London. Spencer was a loyal member of the coterie of nobles that surrounded George Selwyn and was a rake. Prior to Kitty Kennedy he had distinguished himself by seducing the courtesan 'Miss Hermitage' from Sidi Haji Abdrahaman (ambassador from Tripoli) and then the soprano Annina Zamperini. He followed horse racing, was a fine shot and a courageous huntsman.

Kitty Kennedy's other regular admirer was John St John, a younger brother of Viscount Bolingbroke, a barrister and a member of parliament.

Kitty had two younger brothers, Patrick and Matthew Kennedy. They both worked as waiters in alehouses but Kitty was able to use her influence to get them hired by the auctioneer on the Strand in London who employed their father, an auctioneer 'famous for vending bargains to the ignorant and unwary'. Joseph Fitzgerald wrote that the brothers 'had risen to gentility through the earnings of their sister ... a woman of the town popular with gentlemen of fashion'. Bleakley states that when the auctioneer died, Kitty's father retired and her brother Patrick Kennedy became a partner in the business having married the owner's daughter. The identity of the auctioneer is not recorded in the literature on Kitty Kennedy but it was likely William Knight of the Strand who died in August 1769 and whose daughter Charlotte Knight (born January 1749) married a Patrick Kennedy on September 24, 1769.

A drunken brawl on Christmas Eve 1769 brought Patrick and Matthew Kennedy to ruin. After an evening of heavy drinking, the brothers jumped out at a pedestrian crossing Westminster Bridge. Thinking the brothers were robbers, the man shouted for help, and John Bigby, a night watchman, came running to his assistance. A scuffle followed in the middle of which Bigby was struck on the head with a poker. He was carried to the Westminster Hospital, where he died an hour later.

On the following morning — Christmas Day — the two Kennedys were brought before the magistrate Sir John Fielding, and committed to Tothillfields Bridewell on the charge of murder. Their trial took place on Friday 23 February 1770 before Lord Mansfield whom the Earl of Carlisle (Kitty's client) described as 'a dirty dog'. They were sentenced to be executed at Tyburn the following Monday.

'Conversation Piece in the King's Bench Prison Description', satire on Kitty Kennedy's intervention to save her brothers from a charge of murder (British Museum, 1868,0808.9865)

Kitty Kennedy took immediate action and called on her lovers for help. Robert Spencer reluctantly agreed to ask his own brother, the Duke of Marlborough, to beg a pardon from the King. John St John needed less persuasion and agreed to help immediately. Kitty's intervention worked and a reprieve for her brother Patrick reached Newgate prison on Sunday night, but the message made no mention of his younger brother Matthew. Kitty arranged a petition to King George and after intense lobbying it was announced that the brothers Kennedy had received his Majesty's pardon on condition that they be transported to Maryland for life.

Kitty sent another of her clients, James, Earl of Fife, to check on her brother Matthew on board the convict ship in which he would be carried to America. The Earl wrote to his friend George Selwyn: 'Even the horrors of the prison from which he had escaped paled before the horrors of the vessel which was to carry Matthew Kennedy across the Atlantic. Along with fifty other wretches he was thrust into a compartment in the hold, not more than sixteen feet square, fastened to a bench with a collar round his neck, and chained to five loathsome creatures, who, like himself, had escaped the gallows. In this dreadful plight, without air and in semi-darkness, he seemed doomed to pass the long stormy voyage'.

The brothers had already left harbour on their way to the American penal colony when the ship was boarded, they were arrested again and taken back to London. The murder victim's widow had lodged an appeal for a new trial based on fresh evidence with support from the Bill of Rights Society and adherents of John Wilkes. The brothers relied on support from Kitty's clique; Fife, Palmerston, Spencer, and the rest joined in raising a fund to buy off the prosecution. When the day of the brothers' re-trial arrived, on 6 November 1770, they were placed again in the dock and their accuser, John Bigby's widow, was called to give her new evidence. She failed to appear and her appeal was dismissed. It transpired that Kitty's lover, John St John, had persuaded the widow to take £350 in gold to drop her claim. The Kennedy brothers were released from prison in April 1771 and with the help of Kitty's friends it is said that a commission in a Virginia regiment had been obtained for both of them.

Soon after her brothers' departure, in February 1772, Kitty's father died at Kitty's house on Newman Street. He was buried on the 16th February in Marylebone Parish Church, where he used to worship. It was stated in his obituary notice that he was formerly a broker and auctioneer.

== Married life ==
In August 1773 it was announced that the Hon. Mr Byram had married the celebrated Miss Kennedy of Newman Street. Her wedding was celebrated at the Church of Marylebone on the 16th of August "by licence," and according to the register her husband's full name was Robert Stratford Byram.

Henceforth Kitty retired into private life and for a long while little or nothing was heard of her. Directly her marriage was announced a serious-minded journalist expressed the hope that she would make as good a wife as Mrs Ross — the married name of her older rival Fanny Murray having passed into a proverb. However, six years later Kitty had returned once more to the faithful John St John. What had become of Robert Stratford Byram is unknown.

By 1777 Kitty was back in Harris List - the directory of Covent Garden courtesans published between 1760 and 1794. Her entry in the directory includes the following:

By the old proverb, 'that everything is new again every seven years', this lady is brought forward in our group of characters. Her business has been so great, and consequently so variegated, that she has had peers and poets, ambassadors and actors, and gentleman of every denomination in this great metropolis. At present she lives with an upholsterer and auctioneer, whose residence is not far from King Street, Covent Garden. She has a fine face, though rather too corpulent for the present Ton; but really upon the whole is a fine woman and worthy to be admired.

It is said that Kitty's health deteriorated. 'Miss Kennedy, who now weighs thirty-three stone [462 pounds]' runs one of Lord Carlisle's letters to George Selwyn in May 1779, 'is thought by St John to be in a consumption [tuberculosis].' Kitty Kennedy only survived for two years longer, cared for to the last by John St John. Writing to Castle Howard on the 20th of November 1781, William Fawkener thus referred to her death:

The Kennedy died last week, and John St John is gone out of town, I hear, in great affliction: it is one of the luckiest events that could have happened for him, as she was a great expense to him, which he could but ill afford; there never was anything like his good nature and attention to her.

Before he left London the kind-hearted St John paid the last token of respect to the unfortunate woman, for on the 18th of November he followed her remains to their resting-place in St Marylebone churchyard.
