= Sir Charles Bunbury, 6th Baronet =

British politician (1740–1821)

Sir Charles Bunbury Bt
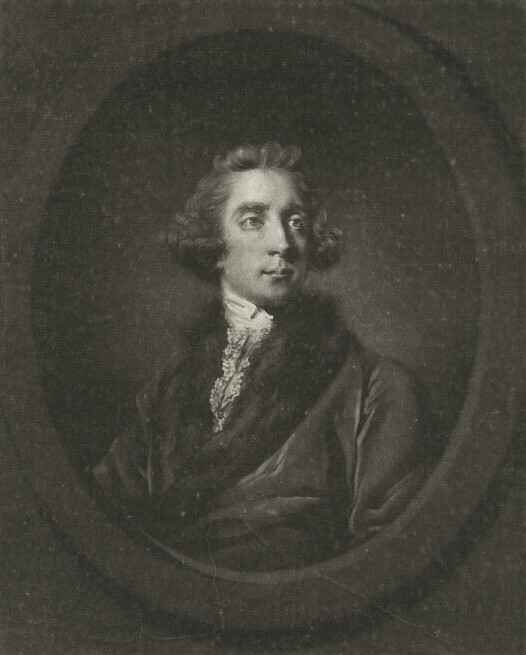
- Engraving of Bunbury
- Born: 1 May 1740
- Died: 31 March 1821 (aged 80)
- Occupation: Politician
- Predecessor: Rev. Sir William Bunbury, 5th Baronet (1710–1764)
- Successor: Sir Henry Bunbury, 7th Baronet (1778–1860)
- Spouses: Sarah Lennox (1762–1776); Margaret Cocksedge (1805–1821)
- Parents: Rev. Sir William Bunbury, 5th Baronet (father); Eleanor Graham (mother)

Sir Thomas Charles Bunbury, 6th Baronet (1 May 1740–31 March 1821), was a British politician who sat in the House of Commons between 1761 and 1812. He also was an important breeder in the development of Thoroughbred racehorses; the Bunbury Cup was named in his honour.

== Life ==
Sir Charles Bunbury was born the eldest son of Reverend Sir William Bunbury, 5th Baronet, Vicar of Mildenhall, Suffolk, and his wife Eleanor, daughter of Vere Graham, on 1 May 1740. The caricaturist Henry Bunbury was his younger brother. He was educated at St Catharine's College, Cambridge. Bunbury was returned to Parliament as one of two representatives for Suffolk in 1761, a seat he held until 1784 and again from 1790 to 1812. He was also High Sheriff of Suffolk in 1788.

Polly Kennedy, portrait commissioned from Joshua Reynolds by Sir Charles depicting his mistress.

Whilst serving as a Whig politician, Bunbury became a strong opponent of the slave trade. He was also a supporter and ally of Charles James Fox (his nephew by marriage) when the latter entered politics in 1768; Fox was the son of Henry Fox, 1st Baron Holland, and Lady Caroline Lennox, the eldest daughter of Charles Lennox, 2nd Duke of Richmond.

Bunbury married firstly Lady Sarah Lennox, one of the famous Lennox sisters, on 2 June 1762. She was a younger daughter of the 2nd Duke of Richmond, who was a grandson of Charles II through his illegitimate son, Charles Lennox, 1st Duke of Richmond. Their notorious marriage, which produced no children—although Sarah gave birth to a daughter fathered by her lover, Lord William Gordon, on 19 December 1768—was dissolved by Act of Parliament on 14 May 1776, on the grounds of Sarah's adultery.

Bunbury's mistress was the famous courtesan Polly Kennedy (also known as Polly Jones) whose portrait Bunbury commissioned from Sir Joshua Reynolds in 1770.

He married secondly Margaret Cocksedge on 21 November 1805, again without children. Bunbury died on 31 March 1821, aged 80, and was succeeded to the baronetcy by his nephew, Henry. Margaret, Lady Bunbury, died in February 1822.

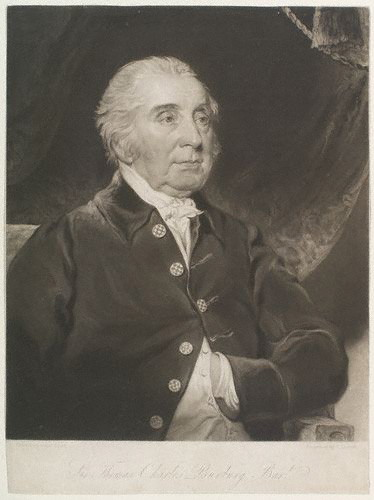
Bunbury, 1819 after Samuel Lane

Bunbury was an important figure in the fields of horse racing and Thoroughbred breeding, whose influence has been described as "crucial". He was a steward of the Jockey Club, and his horses included the Epsom Derby winners Diomed, Eleanor, and Smolensko. His racing silks were pink and white stripes.

Bunbury bred the racehorse and leading sire Highflyer (1774–18 October 1793), one of the most important sons of Herod (April 1758–12 May 1780), the progenitor of the Byerley Turk sire line in the Thoroughbred horse breed.

== Horses ==
- Gimcrack (b. 1760), bought by Sir Charles Bunbury in 1768 and then sold in 1769 to Richard Grosvenor, 1st Earl Grosvenor.
- Highflyer (1774–1793), bred by Sir Charles Bunbury and sold as a yearling.
- Diomed (1777–1808), bought by Sir Charles Bunbury and used at stud. Sold at age 21 in 1798.
- Young Giantess (1790–1811), bred by Sir Charles Bunbury and used as a broodmare.
- Sorcerer (1796–1821), bred by Sir Charles Bunbury. Replaced Diomed as Sir Charles's primary stud.
- Eleanor (1798–1824), bred by Sir Charles Bunbury. Sold to a "Mr. Rush" at auction in 1822.
- Smolensko (1810–10 January 1829), bred by Sir Charles Bunbury. Sold to Richard Wilson in 1822.

== Notes ==
Parliament of Great Britain
Preceded by John Affleck; Rowland Holt	Member of Parliament for Suffolk; 1761–1784; With: Rowland Holt 1761–1768; Sir John Rous, Bt 1768–1771; Rowland Holt 1771–1780; Sir John Rous, Bt 1780–1784	Succeeded by Sir John Rous; Joshua Grigby
Preceded by Sir John Rous, Bt; Joshua Grigby	Member of Parliament for Suffolk; 1790–1801; With: Sir John Rous, Bt 1790–1796; Viscount Brome 1796–1801	Succeeded by Parliament of the United Kingdom
Parliament of the United Kingdom
Preceded by Parliament of the Great Britain	Member of Parliament for Suffolk; 1801–1812; With: Viscount Brome 1801–1806; Thomas Sherlock Gooch 1806–1812	Succeeded by Thomas Sherlock Gooch; Sir William Rowley, Bt
Political offices
Preceded by The Earl of Drogheda	Chief Secretary for Ireland; 1765	Succeeded by Viscount Beauchamp
Baronetage of England
Preceded by William Bunbury	Baronet (of Stanney Hall); 1764–1821	Succeeded by Henry Edward Bunbury
