= Polly Jones =

18th-century London Courtesan

Polly Jones (also known as Polly Kennedy)
- Portrait of Polly Kennedy by Thomas Watson after Joshua Reynolds 1770-1772 (Yale Center for British Art, B1970.3.175)
- Born: probably Polly Jones; Circa 1746; London, England
- Died: Possibly 1781; London, England
- Occupation: Courtesan

Polly Jones (also known as Polly Kennedy) was an 18th-century English courtesan.

Polly Jones is often confused with her contemporary Kitty Kennedy and with another Polly Kennedy from a decade earlier - the courtesan who shared lodgings with Nancy Dawson in the 1750s.

== Early Life ==
Miss Polly Jones, mezzotint by James Watson after Catherine Read (Yale Center for British Art, B1974.12.538)

Miss Polly Jones, mezzotint by Valentine Green 1771 (Yale Center for British Art, B1970.3.488)

Polly Jones by Robert Laurie, printed for Robert Sayer, after Hugh Douglas Hamilton mezzotint, published 20 October 1771 (National Portrait Gallery).

In the memoirs that she published in 1790, the retired courtesan Ann Sheldon repeated Polly Jones' own account of her upbringing and recruitment as a prostitute by Elizabeth Mitchell:

In the course of her conversation, [Polly] gave me the following sketch of her history. Her father and mother were hawking pedlars, who sold wooden ware and cabbage nets about the streets, while Polly attended them with her moving shop of watercress, and common herbage. In this situation she happened to attract the notice of Mrs. Mitchell, a well known inhabitant of King's Place. That good lady, hacknied in the arts of seduction, attacked at the same moment, the vanity of the girl, and the wants of her parents. In short, Mrs. Mitchell wanted a servant, exactly such a servant as Polly and, perhaps, she did not deviate from truth, when she told the pedlar that she would take the same care of his child, as if it were her own. So the poor girl was taken to Mrs. Mitchell's house, stripped naked, put into a large tub of water, when after having been cleansed from the dirt and defilement of her late situation, she was handsomely clothed, and at night consigned to a defilement of another and more fatal species, in the arms of a gentleman, who gladdened Mrs. Mitchell's heart with the sum which he gave her for the prize she had so luckily procured him.

Elizabeth Mitchell was a famous brothel-keeper on King's Place, a road running between Pall Mall and King Street in St James's in London. It was a thoroughfare lined with high class brothels nicknamed 'nunneries' or 'cloisters'.

Polly was described as being 'Small and auburn-haired with dark eyes and an inviting smile'.

== Fame ==
Polly Jones had achieved celebrity by 1762 when her portrait in pastel was made by Catherine Read. Read’s portrait of her went on to be widely reproduced in mezzotint. Her portrait was also made in pastel by Francis Cotes in 1768.

In January 1768 George Selwyn wrote that Polly was robbed of 12 guineas when alighting from her sedan chair outside the home of her lover Lord Bolingbroke who lived close to him on Chesterfield Street. Lord Bolingbroke's brother, John St John, was the lover of Polly's rival Kitty Kennedy.

Portrait of Polly Jones, pastel by Catherine Read (Buscot Park)

In September 1769, the Town and Country Magazine, a scandalous review that featured a monthly exposé of the amorous adventures of public men, dubbed by the publication 'Tête à Têtes', published an account of the love life of Prince Henry, Duke of Cumberland, brother of King George III. The article made public Polly Jones' liaison with the Duke:

‘After [the Duke of Cumberland’s] return, when it was universally known that the attachment between him and Miss Elliot no longer subsisted, Miss Polly Jones, who was at that time united with [Lord Bolingbroke] thought proper to make some indirect overtures to [the Duke], and left that nobleman, to accept the proposals that were now made from our hero. His fondness for this new mistress continued for several months, till at length, [the Duke] meeting with a lady more to his taste, and in a higher rank of life, Miss Jones was deserted for the Countess [Camilla] D’Onhoff.’

Ann Sheldon's memoirs give colour to the story:

'...when being at Vauxhall Gardens, [Polly Jones] happened to captivate the Duke of Cumberland, who arranged the matter with Mrs. Mitchell, by paying her about seventy pounds which she said Miss Jones owed her. The young lady was then taken home by his Royal Highness, where she declared, she had every reason to be contented.'

Ann Sheldon met Polly Jones and the Duke of Cumberland together at Sunning Hill and regularly accompanied them on their evening walks during which Polly amused the Duke by tumbling in the grass with her heels over head and holding indecent postures. The Duke confided in Ann that his mistress' vulgarity quite disgusted him, and asked Ann if she was interested in taking her place as his live-in lover; she refused.

Polly Jones told Ann Sheldon she had no objection to the Duke but there was somebody in town whom she liked better, namely one of the Kennedy brothers who were famous for the murder of a watchman on Westminster Bridge and for obtaining pardons from the King through the intercession of their sister - the courtesan Kitty Kennedy. Polly told Ann that if she could secure one of the Kennedy brothers, she would leave the Duke's protection.

After Polly and the Duke parted in 1769 she accused him in a letter to the Town and Country Magazine of selling the furniture that he had given her because he had run out of money. Polly claimed the Duke 'immediately sent the proper officers to dispossess me of my household furniture, which had been provided at his expense, and left me destitute, friendless, and almost penniless, after he had proffered the greatest regard, esteem, and even love for me; without the least provocation on my side, or even the shadow of a pretence for such conduct.' She followed through by taking legal proceedings against one of the Duke's retainers claiming a debt of £3000 under a bond that she had received from him. She won the case with support from Lord Bolingbroke but it was overturned on appeal.

In 1770, Polly took to calling herself Polly Kennedy. She sat for a portrait by Sir Joshua Reynolds in November 1770 and February 1771 and his appointment book describes her as 'Miss Kennedy'. The painting was commissioned by Sir Charles Bunbury who was her new paramour. Sir Charles' main interests were in racing and gambling. Known to his numerous friends at his London clubs of Brooks's and White's as 'Bully', he drank enough to be noticed even in a time of heavy indulgence.

In 1771 Polly lived with the madam Charlotte Hayes in Duke Street, St James's (calling herself Polly Jones again).

Polly’s fame was such that in August 1771, Horace Walpole wrote to the Earl of Stafford from Paris:

‘They make no more of breaking Parliaments here than an English mob does of breaking windows. It is pity people are so ill-sorted. If this King and ours should cross over and figure in, Louis XV would dissolve our Parliament if Polly Jones did but say a word to him. They have got into such a habit of it here, that you would think a Parliament was a polypus: they cut it in two, and by next morning half of it becomes a whole assembly.'

In 1773 Polly was included in Harris's List - the directory of Covent Garden courtesans published between 1760 and 1794. It seems that Polly Jones may still have been Bunbury’s mistress in 1782, for on October 14, 1782, Edward Gibbon wrote to Lord Sheffield concerning alliances in Parliament:

‘I am at a loss what to say or think about our Parliamentary state. A certain late Secretary of Ireland [Sir Charles Bunbury] the husband of Polly Jones, reckons the House of Commons’ thus: Minister 140, Reynard 90, Boreas 120, the rest unknown, or uncertain. The last of the three, by self or agents, talks too much of absence, neutrality, moderation. I still think he will discard the game.’

In his memoirs, William Hickey describes a renewed acquaintance with 'Mary Sturgess, previously known as Polly Jones' ... 'a fine woman, plump and lusty, with good skin and lovely eyes' with an elegant house in Cumberland Court off Drury Lane in Covent Garden.
