= John Affleck (politician) =

British politician (1710–1776)

John Affleck (12 February 1710 – 17 February 1776) was a British Tory politician who sat in the House of Commons between 1743 and 1761.

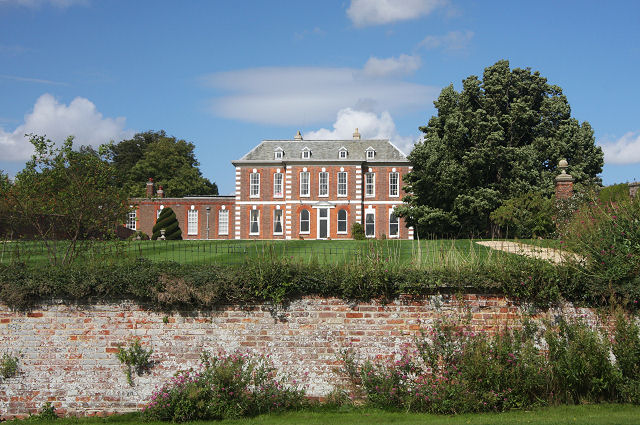
Dalham Hall, Suffolk

Affleck was the second and eldest surviving son of Gilbert Affleck of Dalham Hall, Suffolk and his wife Anna Dolben, daughter of John Dolben. His younger brother was Sir Edmund Affleck, 1st Baronet. He was educated at Westminster School (1722), Christ Church, Oxford (1727) and studied law at the Inner Temple (1728).

In 1743, Affleck was returned as member of parliament (MP) for Suffolk representing the constituency until 1761. Between 1767 and 1768, he sat also as MP for Amersham.

In 1736 Affleck married Sarah Metcalfe, only daughter of James Metcalfe, and had by her 3 sons. In 1764 he succeeded his father to Dalham Hall, near Bury St Edmunds, Suffolk.

Parliament of Great Britain
Preceded by Sir Cordell Firebrace; Sir Jermyn Davers	Member of Parliament for Suffolk; 1743–1761; With: Sir Cordell Firebrace 1743–1759; Rowland Holt 1759–1761	Succeeded by Rowland Holt; Sir Charles Bunbury
Preceded by Benet Garrard; William Drake, Sr	Member of Parliament for Amersham; 1767–1768; With: William Drake, Sr	Succeeded by William Drake, Jr; William Drake, Sr
