= Rowland Holt =

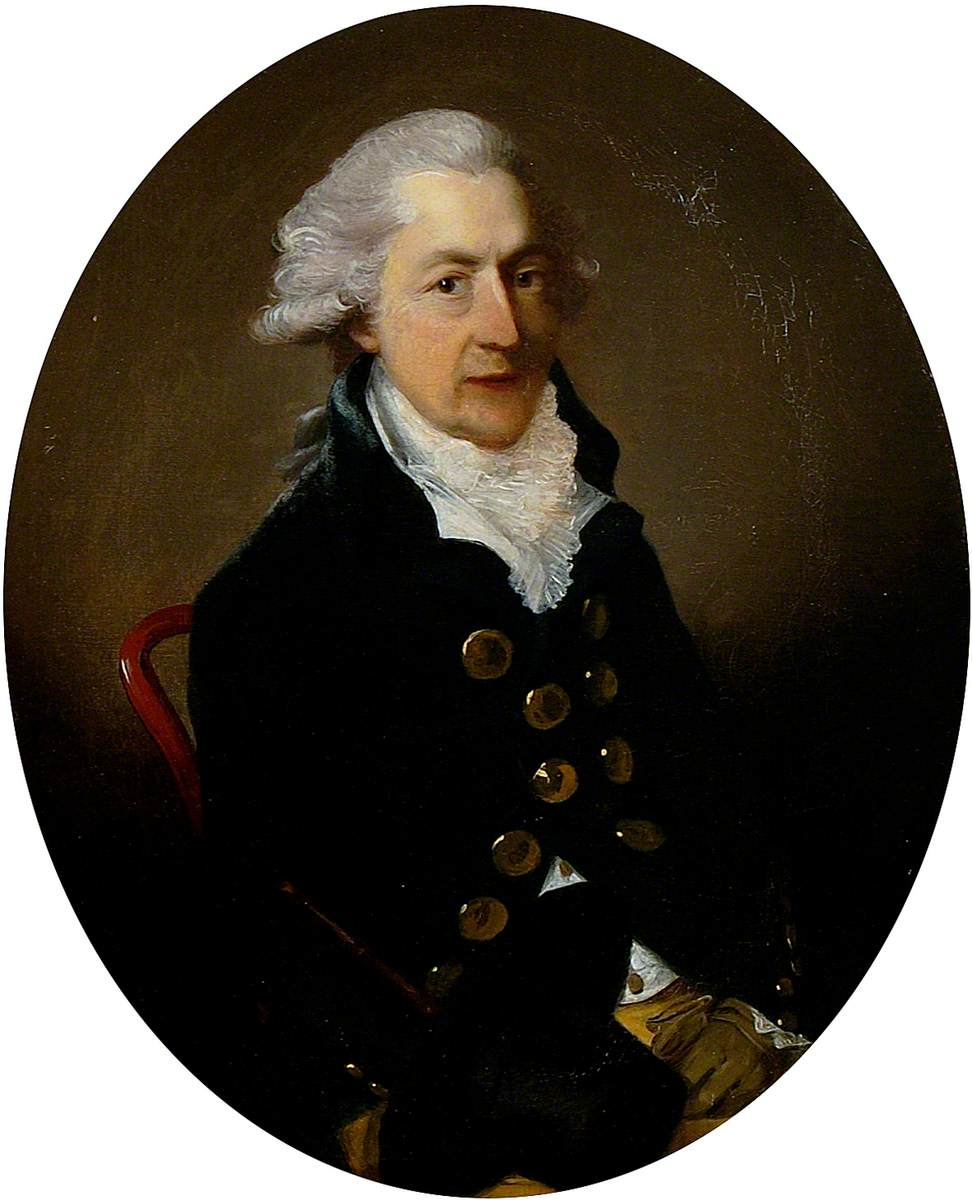
Rowland Holt

Rowland Holt (c. 1723–1786) of Redgrave Hall, Suffolk, was a British politician who sat in the House of Commons between 1759 and 1780.

== Early life ==
Holt was the son of Rowland Holt and his wife Elizabeth Washington, and the great-nephew of Sir John Holt, Lord Chief Justice. The Holts were merchants and lawyers. His father died on 25 July 1739 and he succeeded to his estates including Redgrave Hall. He matriculated at Magdalen College, Oxford on 23 December 1740, aged 17 and undertook a Grand Tour to Italy in about 1746. When in Rome in 1746, he is reported to have dined with the Pretender.

== First Parliaments ==
Holt was elected Member of Parliament for Suffolk in a by-election on 20 April 1759 as a stop-gap on the death of Sir Cordell Firebrace, Bt. When Sir John Rous, Bt thought of standing for Suffolk at the general election of 1761, Holt complained to his colleague, John Affleck, that he feared he would be greatly out-numbered and that he should be laid aside after being made use of by the county for two years only’. A compromise was then arranged, whereby Rous stood down on the understanding that room should be made for him in 1768 at the latest, and the 1761 election was uncontested. As the 1768 general election drew near neither of the sitting Members was prepared to abide by the agreement of 1761, and as Rous was determined to stand, all three were nominated at the county meeting on 6 November 1767. But three days later Holt, reflecting on having been forsaken at the meeting by gentlemen on whose support he had counted, took his ‘final leave’ of the electors in a letter to them.

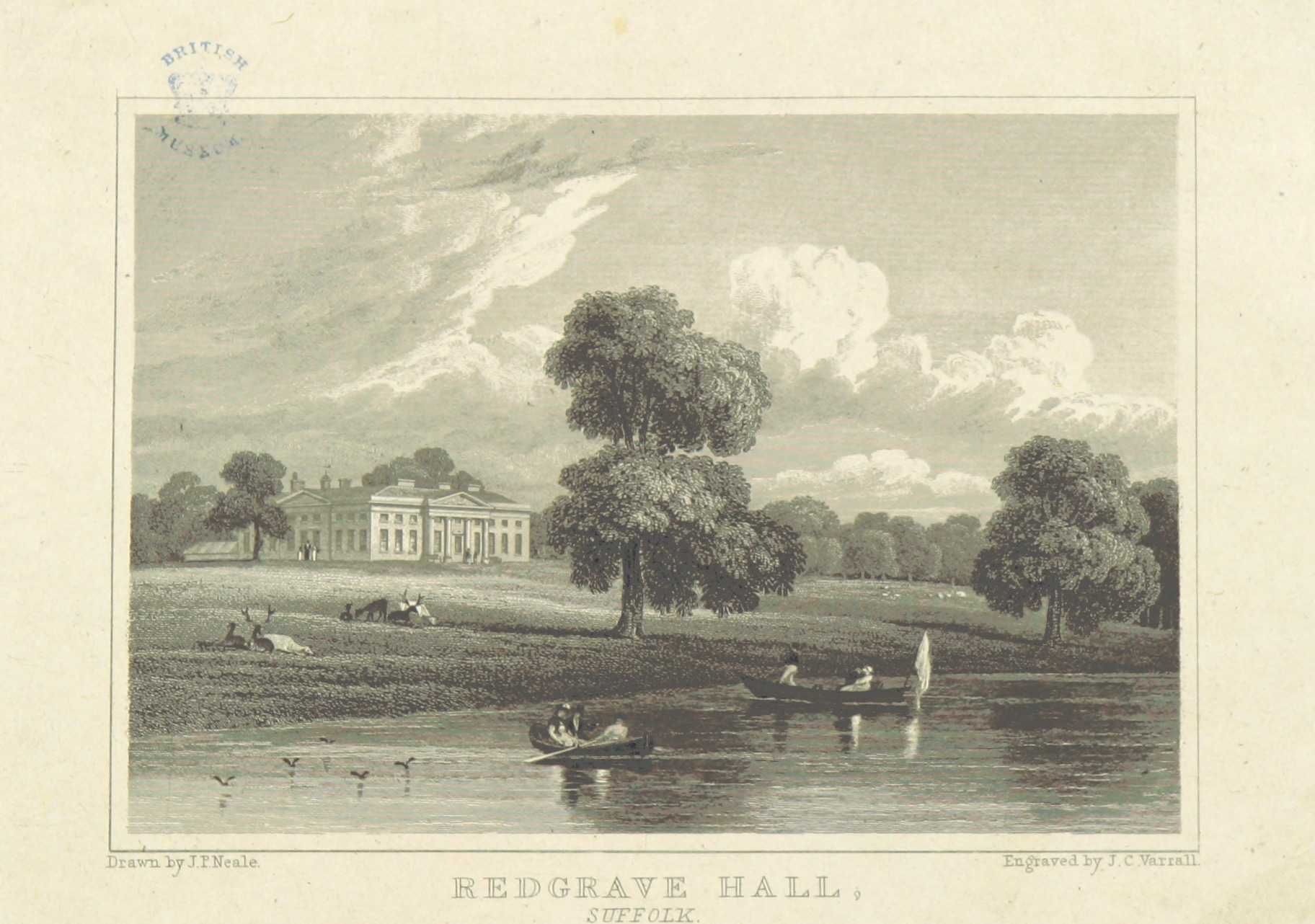
Redgrave Hall by John Preston Neale

== Redgrave Hall ==
In another letter to electors Holt explained his decision and concluded by asking leave for the future to build his enjoyments ‘with more durable materials than the popular breath of such folks as constitute a majority at most public meetings’. In 1763 he had commissioned Capability Brown to remodel Redgrave Hall and Park in fashionable classical style. He created a sinuous, 50-acre (20 ha) lake, a Palladian 'rotunda' or round house in one corner of the Park, and a 'water house' (later known as the Kennels) beside the Lake. A decorative Orangery and a red brick stable block were built near the Hall. The work at Redgrave was finally completed in 1773 at a total cost of £30,000. Holt also owned a house in London, at 47 Pall Mall.

== Second Parliaments ==
When Sir John Rous died on 31 October 1771, Holt stood for Suffolk again, apparently with support from Grafton and the Administration, against Rous's son, who withdrew from the contest at the county meeting at Stowmarket on 13 November. Holt was returned unopposed in a by-election on 18 December 1771. In the 1774 general election he was again returned unopposed. In 1780 there was the prospect of a contest, but Holt, who seemed unwilling to take part in contested elections, withdrew, and never stood for Parliament again. There is no record of his having spoken in the House during the 18 years he was a Member.

== Later life ==
Holt died unmarried on 12 July 1786 and the Redgrave estate passed to his brother Thomas.

Parliament of Great Britain
Preceded by John Affleck; Sir Cordell Firebrace, Bt	Member of Parliament for Suffolk; 1759–1768; With: John Affleck 1759-1761; Sir Charles Bunbury, Bt 1761-1768	Succeeded by Sir Charles Bunbury, Bt; Sir John Rous, Bt
Preceded by Sir Charles Bunbury, Bt; Sir John Rous, Bt	Member of Parliament for Suffolk; 1771–1780; With: Sir Charles Bunbury, Bt	Succeeded by Sir Charles Bunbury, Bt; Sir John Rous, Bt
