= Sir John Rous, 5th Baronet =

British Whig politician

Sir John Rous, 5th Baronet (c.1728 – 31 October 1771) was a British Whig politician.

Rous was the only surviving son of Sir Robert Rous, 4th Baronet and Lydia Smith. He was educated at Trinity College, Cambridge. On 8 June 1735 he succeeded to his father's baronetcy and on 5 June 1749 he married Judith Bedingfield.

Rous was elected unopposed as a Member of Parliament for Suffolk in the 1768 British general election after Rowland Holt had failed to secure sufficient support at the county meeting on 6 November 1767. He voted four times in the House of Commons, every time on the side of the opposition Rockingham Whigs. He died on 31 October 1771.

Parliament of England
Preceded by Sir Charles Bunbury, Bt; Rowland Holt	Member of Parliament for Suffolk; 1768–1771; With: Sir Charles Bunbury, Bt	Succeeded by Sir Charles Bunbury, Bt; Rowland Holt
Baronetage of England
Preceded by Robert Rous	Baronet (of Henham); 1735–1771	Succeeded by John Rous
