= Sir Cordell Firebrace, 3rd Baronet =

British landowner and Tory politician

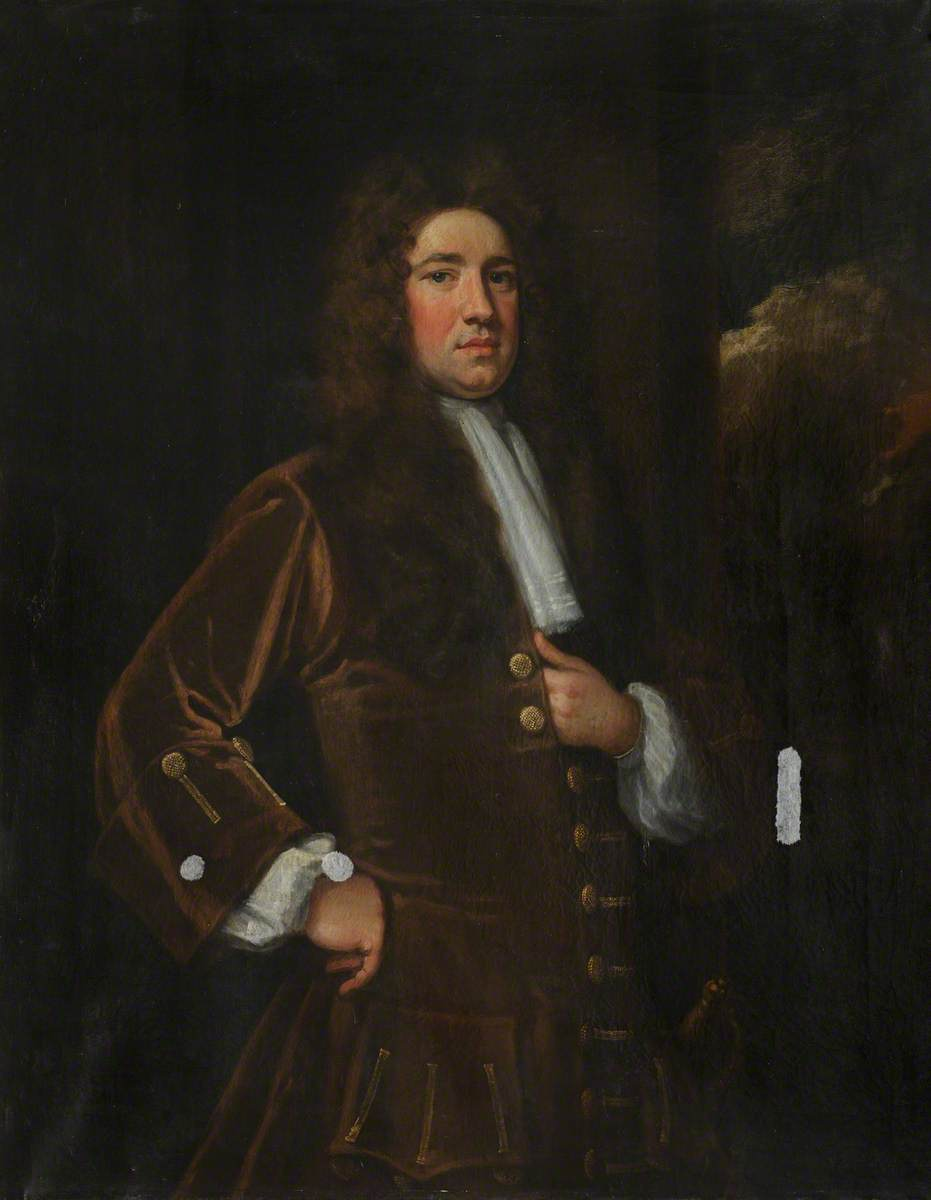
- Sir Cordell Firebrace by Godfrey Kneller, c.1700
- Born: 20 February 1712
- Died: 28 March 1759 (aged 47)
- Father: Sir Charles Firebrace, 2nd Baronet
- Mother: Margaret Cordell
- Occupation: Politician and landowner

Sir Cordell Firebrace, 3rd Baronet (20 February 1712 – 28 March 1759), of Long Melford, Suffolk, was a British landowner and Tory politician who sat in the House of Commons from 1735 to 1759.

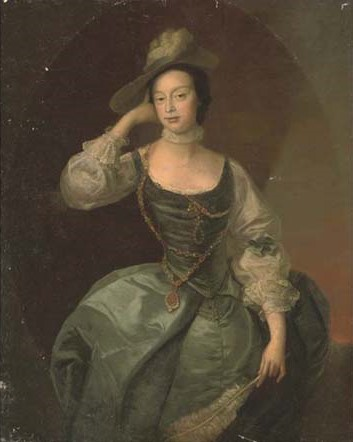
Lady Firebrace, painting by the follower of Thomas Hudson

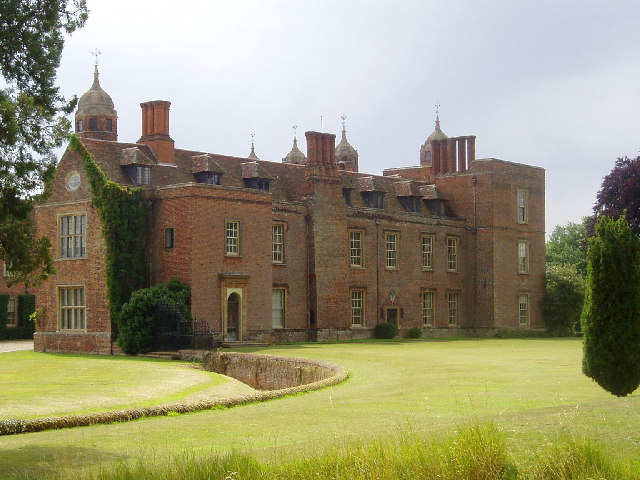
Melford Hall

== Biography ==
Firebrace was the only son of Sir Charles Firebrace, 2nd Baronet, of Stoke Golding, Leicestershire and his wife Margaret Cordell, daughter of Sir John Cordell, 2nd Baronet, MP, of Long Melford, Suffolk. His grandfather was a London vintner. In 1727, he succeeded to the baronetcy on the death of his father. He matriculated at St John's College, Oxford on 9 May 1729. He married Bridget Evers, widow of Edward Evers of Ipswich, and Washingley, Lincolnshire and daughter of Philip Bacon of Ipswich on 25 October 1737.

Firebrace was returned unopposed as a Tory Member of Parliament for Suffolk at a by-election on 5 March 1735. He was probably unwell at the time of the divisions on the Convention of Pardo in 1739 and the place bill in 1740 when he was absent. At the 1741 British general election he was returned unopposed again for Suffolk.

After the Jacobite rebellion in 1745, in response to insinuations, he was at pains to argue that he never was in the least disposed to the Pretender's interest but 'did associate and subscribe to support his Majesty' with his 'life and fortune' during the late rebellion. He voted against the Government in all recorded divisions except on the Hanoverians in 1746, when he was absent again. He spoke against the Heritable Jurisdictions in Scotland bill on 14 April 1747.

At the 1747 British general election, he was returned for Suffolk in a contest. He also had a considerable interest at Ipswich and elsewhere, which he gave to Frederick, Prince of Wales. In Egmont's lists of people who would receive office on the accession of Frederick, Firebrace was marked down to become a lord of the Admiralty. His only recorded speech in this Parliament was made in the debate of 19 February 1753 on Nova Scotia.

In 1740, in his capacity as local magistrate in Long Melford, he oversaw the interview of Edward Humfrey in connection to the murder of Charles John Frew.

Firebrace was returned unopposed as a Tory again for Suffolk at the 1754 British general election. No speech by him is recorded after 1754, but he was included in Newcastle's list of 1757 of 'speakers and efficient men' and was placed in Pitt's group.

Firebrace died without issue on 28 March 1759 and the baronetcy became extinct.

Parliament of Great Britain
Preceded by Sir Jermyn Davers, Bt; Sir Robert Kemp, Bt	Member of Parliament for Suffolk; 1735–1759; With: Sir Jermyn Davers, Bt 1735-1743; John Affleck 1743-1759	Succeeded by John Affleck; Rowland Holt
Baronetage of England
Preceded by Charles Firebrace	Baronet (of London); 1727-1759	Extinct
