= Dong, Dong, Dongdaemun =

Korean children's song

Song

Dong, Dong, Dongdaemun (Korean: 『동, 동, 동대문』) is a nursery rhyme sung among Korean children, usually while playing a game. It is also the name of the game. Its melody starts identically to the German children's song "Lasst uns froh und munter sein", but ends differently.

Dongdaemun and Namdaemun are the old city gates of Seoul.

== Lyrics ==
(Variations may exist in different regions of the country.)

- In Hangul

동, 동, 동대문을 열어라,
남, 남, 남대문을 열어라,
12시가 되면은, (or 지나면,)
문을 닫는다.

- In Revised Romanisation:

Dong, Dong, Dongdaemuneul yeoreora,
Nam, Nam, Namdaemuneul yeoreora,
Yeol dusiga doemyeoneun, (or Yeol dusiga jinamyeon,)
Muneul danneunda.

- Translation

Open the East, East, East Grand Gate,
Open the South, South, South Grand Gate,
When the time hits twelve sharp,
The Gates will be closed shut.

== The game ==
Two children are selected as the gatekeepers (or the gate itself). They hold their both hands to form an arch so the other players can pass under it. Children start to sing the song as they pass through the gate one by one in a row. When the song ends, the gates are closed as the gatekeepers lower their hands and catch the child who was passing through the gate. The caught child becomes the new gatekeeper. Players can play another round to select the second gatekeeper, or they can replace the gatekeepers one by one after each turn of the game.

== See also ==
- "Oranges and Lemons", English nursery rhyme for playing a similar game
- "London Bridge Is Falling Down", another English nursery rhyme for playing a similar game
- ஒருகுடம் தண்ணி ஊத்தி, Tamil nursery rhyme for playing a similar game
