= Charles John Drew =

English lawyer

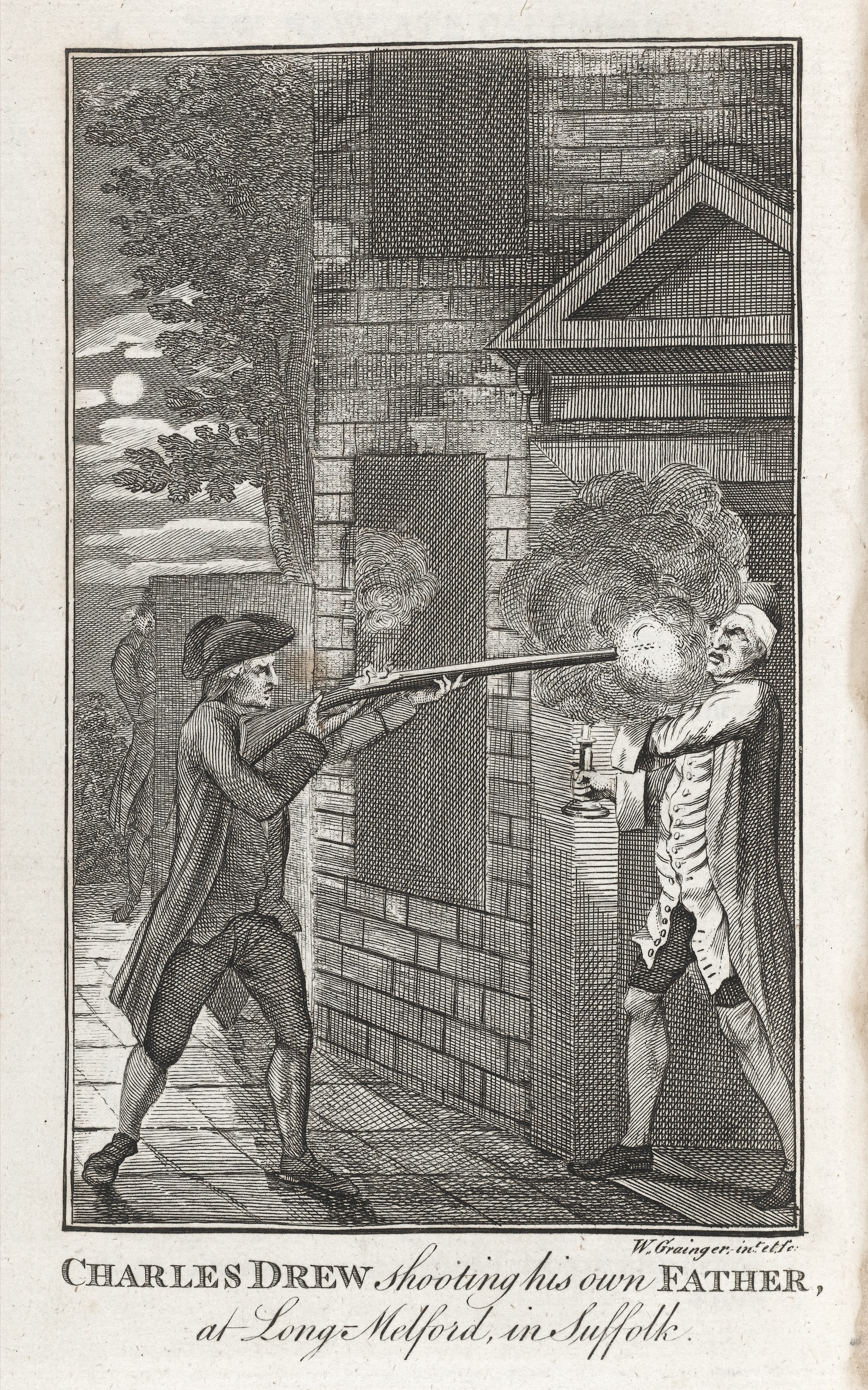
Credit: Wellcome Library

Charles John Drew (c. 1690–1740) was an English lawyer at attorney murdered by his own son.

== Background ==
Drew lived in Long Melford in Suffolk where he had two properties: a large house with estate on the edge of town, and a small office on the High Street where he sometimes slept.

His behaviour caused much concern: in his main house he had moved his wife and five daughters into the lower floor (normally reserved for servants) and he lived in the upper floors with his mistress.

During this period his son, also Charles Drew, started hanging around with poachers and smugglers and spent much time drinking and gambling. He felt abandoned by his father, who had not provided him with a university education as befitted his background. He began a relationship with Elizabeth (Betsy) Boyer, a housekeeper at nearby Liston Hall in Sudbury less than two miles to the south. They feared the relationship would cause the father to write him out of his will. Betsy said he should shoot his father.

Charles met with Edward Humphries or Humfrey who he knew from his gambling circles and offered him £200 to kill his father. Humfrey ran the Angel tavern on Long Melford. Elizabeth gave them a gun from Liston Hall, probably a short blunderbuss filled with a pack of lead slugs and a cartridge of gunpowder.

They then rode to the main family house outside Long Melford and had a brandy before heading to Charles Drew Senior's office around 11pm.

== Murder ==
On the night of 31 January/1 February 1740 Drew was alone in his smaller house in Long Melford with only one male servant in attendance. He had given a letter to the servant to post first thing in the morning. On rising the servant found Drew dead, lying on his back close to the front door which was still open. It appeared that Drew had opened the door and been shot immediately after the door swung open.

Three pieces of lead were lodged in his body and three further pieces lay nearby. The servant had heard no gunshot and nothing was missing.

On 12 February the London Gazette offered a pardon to any secondary accomplice who would give information leading to the arrest of the murderer. A £100 reward was also offered by John Gent of Long Melford.

Edward Humfrey (originally of Chelmsford) was interviewed in connection to the crime by Sir Cordell Firebrace. He was known to local authorities as having been connected to smuggling and other illegal activities. His room was searched and correspondence was found with a Mr Thomas Roberts, Humphries himself using the alias of John Smith in the letters. A Timothy Drew lawyer (not related) tracked Roberts to lodgings on Shire Lane in London but he had moved on. On 14 March he found that Roberts had rooms at a tavern but narrowly missed him. They found him soon after and was taken to the mansion of Justice Colonel De Veil, a judge, and questioned for six hours. He was then held in Newgate Prison. Thomas Roberts proved to be Charles Drew Jr. who had also taken to dressing very differently to try to hide his identity.

Interviews revealed that Charles Drew Jr. had gone to his father's house with Humphries and was watching, expecting Humphries to kill him when he answered the door, but Humphries threw the gun down and said he could not do it. Charles had then picked up the gun, knocked on the door, and shot his father at point blank range when he answered. It is noted that a blunderbuss makes quite a different sound than a rifle (or musket of the day) and although loud, the noise does not carry in the same way as the crack of a musket, perhaps explaining why no neighbours recalled the shot.

Charles had first gone to tell Betsy of the deed and hide the gun in a hollow tree then headed for London. From London he hired a man called William Mace to return to his home area to try to hear rumours of the murder and any suspects. Humfreys went to Dunmow to finish a smuggling operation then went to London. Charles was arrested at a "bagnio" (brothel) in Leicester Fields in London on 15 March and also held at Newgate Prison. On 22 March he tried to offer the jailer, Jonathan Keate, £1000 (£200,000 in 2020) to release him and organise a boat to France. Keate declined and informed the warden Mr Ackerman of the attempted bribe. He was moved to Bury prison the next day.

On 29 March 1740 Charles Drew was put on trial at Bury St Edmunds Assizes. The trial lasted 5 hours and involved 15 witnesses. Charles tried to blame Humfrey. He called two witnesses but these both established he was at the main family home which was so close to the murder scene as to undermine rather than bolster his own case. Found guilty by the jury, Charles explained he had killed his father as he had refused to help him with various debts.

Humfreys was not charged with anything in relation to the murder, claiming that he heard a bang but did not know that Charles had shot his father. He was however arrested on charges of smuggling. Betsy Boyer was also not charged despite appearing to instigate the attack.

Hs sisters visited him in prison whilst awaiting his sentence. He was hanged on 12 April 1740 in front of a large crowd in front of the county jail at Bury St Edmunds.

== Grave ==
Despite being a murderer it is said that he was buried in the chancel of Acton church where his brother-in-law (having married Mary Drew) Rev Charles Umferville, was minister.
