= Here We Go Round the Mulberry Bush =

English nursery rhyme and singing game

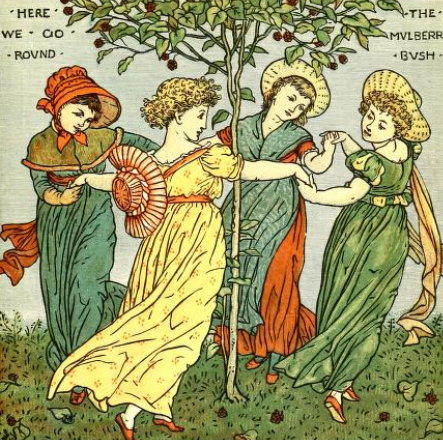
Caption reads "Here we go round the Mulberry Bush" in The Baby's Opera, a Book of Old Rhymes and the Music by the Earliest Masters, 1877. Artwork by Walter Crane.

"Here We Go Round the Mulberry Bush" (also titled "Mulberry Bush" or "This Is the Way") is an English nursery rhyme and singing game. It has a Roud Folk Song Index number of 7882. It uses the tune which Nancy Dawson danced into fame in The Beggar's Opera in mid-1700s London. The same tune is also used for "Lazy Mary, Will You Get Up" and "Nuts in May". A variant is used for "The Wheels on the Bus".

== Lyrics ==
The most common modern version of the rhyme is:

Here we go round the mulberry bush,
The mulberry bush, the mulberry bush.
Here we go round the mulberry bush
On a cold and frosty morning.

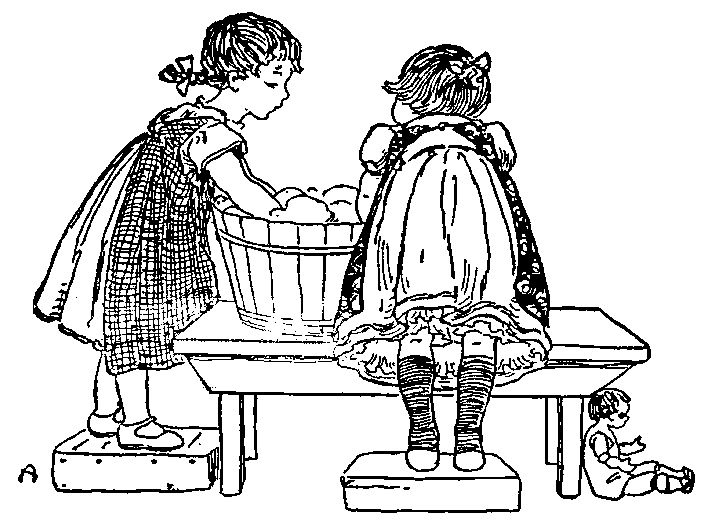
Illustrations from the A Book of Nursery Rhymes from 1901

This is the way we wash our face,
Wash our face, wash our face.
This is the way we wash our face
On a cold and frosty morning.

This is the way we comb our hair,
Comb our hair, comb our hair.
This is the way we comb our hair
On a cold and frosty morning.

This is the way we brush our teeth,
Brush our teeth, brush our teeth.
This is the way we brush our teeth
On a cold and frosty morning.

This is the way we put on our clothes,
Put on our clothes, put on our clothes.
This is the way we put on our clothes
On a cold and frosty morning.

Here we go round the mulberry bush,
The mulberry bush, the mulberry bush.
Here we go round the mulberry bush
On a cold and frosty morning.

Other versions of the song tend to say "so early in the morning" or just "early in the morning" in place of "on a cold and frosty morning". The verse "This is the way we go to school" is used sometimes.

== Origins and meaning ==
The rhyme was first recorded by James Orchard Halliwell as an English children's game in the mid-nineteenth century. He noted that there was a similar game with the lyrics "Here we go round the bramble bush". The bramble bush may be an earlier version, possibly changed because of the difficulty of the alliteration, since mulberries do not grow on bushes.

Halliwell said subsequent verses included: "This is the way we wash our clothes", "This is the way we dry our clothes", "This is the way we mend our shoes", "This is the way the gentlemen walk" and "This is the way the ladies walk".

The song and the associated game are traditional, and have parallels in Scandinavia and in the Netherlands (the bush is a juniper in Scandinavia).

Local historian R. S. Duncan suggests that the song originated with female prisoners at HMP Wakefield. A sprig was taken from Hatfeild Hall (Normanton Golf Club) in Stanley, Wakefield, and grew into a fully mature mulberry tree around which prisoners exercised in the moonlight. The mulberry tree died during 2017 and was cut down and removed on 19 May 2019. Cuttings were taken during the 1980s and have grown into mature trees. Further cuttings taken from these trees will be replanted at HMP Wakefield to replace the mulberry tree.

The Christmas carol, "As I Sat on a Sunny Bank", collected by Cecil Sharp in Worcestershire, has a very similar melody; as does the related "I Saw Three Ships."

Another possible interpretation of the rhyme is that it references Britain's struggles to produce silk, mulberry trees being a key habitat for the cultivation of silkworms. As Bill Bryson explains, Britain in the eighteenth and nineteenth centuries tried to emulate the success of the Chinese in silk production but the industry was held back by periodic harsh winters and mulberry trees proved too sensitive to frost to thrive. The traditional lyrics "Here we go round the mulberry bush / On a cold and frosty morning" may therefore be a joke about the problems faced by the industry.

== Game and song ==
The simple game involves holding hands in a circle and moving around to the first verse, which is alternated with the specific verse, where the players break up to imitate various appropriate actions.

A variant of this rhyme is "Nuts in May", sharing the tune as well as the traditional closing line "On a cold and frosty morning".

== See also ==
- List of nursery rhymes
- Nuts in May (rhyme)
- The Wheels on the Bus
- Pop Goes the Weasel
