= Michael Bunbury =

British baronet

Sir Michael William Bunbury , 13th Baronet KCVO DL (born 29 December 1946) is a British businessman and landowner based in Suffolk.

== Business life ==
- Duchy of Lancaster (became a member 1993; retired as chairman and member of council on 31 December 2005)
- Buckmaster & Moore, 1968–74
- Smith & Williamson, Partner 1974-97, Chm 1986-93
- Fleming High Income Investment Trust Plc, 1996–97, Dir 1995-97
- HarbourVest Global Private Equity, Chm 2007-20
- BH Global Ltd, Chm 2013-21
- JP Morgan Claverhouse Investment Trust Plc, Dir 1996-2015, Chm 2005
- Foreign & Colonial Investment Trust Plc, Dir 1998-2012
- Invesco Perpetual Select Trust Plc, Dir 2008-18
- Arix Bioscience Plc, Dir 2021-2022
- Mem Exec Cttee CLA, 1992–97 and 1999-2004 (Chm Taxation Cttee, 1999-2003) (Chm Cttee Suffolk Branch, 1995–97)
- Suffolk Agricultural Association, President, 2001–02
- Suffolk Coastal Conservative Association, President 2019-
- Patron of Holy Innocents Church, Great Barton, Suffolk
- Lloyd's of London: chairman of the PSL (Personal Stop Loss) Policyholders' Association
- He was appointed a Knight Commander of the Royal Victorian Order (KCVO) in the 2005 Birthday Honours
- Was High Sheriff of Suffolk in 2006/07.
- Deputy Lieutenant of Suffolk

== Personal life ==
Educated Eton College and Trinity College, Cambridge. Married with two sons and a daughter, he lives at Naunton Hall, Rendlesham, Woodbridge, Suffolk.

== Sources ==
- Who's Who
- Burke's Peerage

Baronetage of England
Preceded by (John) William Napier Bunbury	Baronet (of Stanney Hall); 1985–	Incumbent
