= Edward Bunbury =

British barrister and politician (1811–1895)

Sir Edward Herbert Bunbury, 9th Baronet (8 July 1811 – 5 March 1895), known as Edward Bunbury until 1886, was a British barrister and a Liberal Party politician.

== Biography ==
Bunbury was the second son of Sir Henry Bunbury, 7th Baronet, and the grandson of Henry Bunbury; his mother was Louisa Emilia Fox, daughter of Henry Edward Fox. He was educated at Trinity College, Cambridge. He was called to the bar by the Inner Temple in 1841.

In 1847, Bunbury was elected to the House of Commons for Bury St Edmunds, a seat he held until 1852. In 1886, he succeeded his elder brother in the baronetcy.

Bunbury died of pneumonia in March 1895, aged 83. He never married and was succeeded in the baronetcy by his nephew, Charles.

== Work ==
Bunbury's two-volume history of ancient geography published in 1879 is the first modern work in English which treats the textual sources with any sophistication.

He was also a contributing author to the Dictionary of Greek and Roman Geography (1854–57), and to a number of other reference works. Samuel Sharpe thought Bunbury had plagiarised his work on the Ptolemies.

== Notes ==
Parliament of the United Kingdom
Preceded by The Earl Jermyn; Lord Charles FitzRoy	Member of Parliament for Bury St Edmunds; 1847–1852; With: The Earl Jermyn	Succeeded by The Earl Jermyn; John Stuart
Baronetage of England
Preceded by Charles James Fox Bunbury	Baronet (of Stanney Hall); 1886–1895	Succeeded by Henry Charles Bunbury
