= Noël Louis St Pierre Bunbury =

British Army officer (1890–1971)

- Born: 25 December 1890; Woolwich
- Died: 31 January 1971 (aged 80); Hale, Halton
- Military career
- Allegiance: United Kingdom
- Branch: British Indian Army
- Service years: 1912–1944
- Rank: Brigadier
- Unit: 13th Frontier Force Rifles
- Conflicts: World War I; Russian Civil War; Waziristan campaign (1919–1920); Waziristan campaign (1936–1939); World War II
- Awards: DSO

Brigadier Noël Louis St Pierre Bunbury DSO (1890–1971) was a senior British Indian Army officer during the Second World War.

== Biography ==
Born in Woolwich on 25 December 1890, Noël Louis St Pierre Bunbury was educated at Bedford School and at the Royal Military College, Sandhurst. He served during the First World War between 1914 and 1918, in Siberia during the Russian Civil War in 1919, during the Waziristan Campaign in 1920, in Waziristan in 1930, and during the Waziristan Campaign between 1936 and 1937. He served during the Second World War between 1939 and 1944, was promoted to the rank of Brigadier in 1941, and was Aide-de-camp to King George VI between 1943 and 1944.

Brigadier Noël Louis St Pierre Bunbury was invested as a Companion of the Distinguished Service Order in 1937. He retired from the British Indian Army in 1944 and died in Hale, Halton, on 31 January 1971, aged 80.
