= Henry William St Pierre Bunbury =

Biography of Henry William St Pierre Bunbury

Henry Bunbury CB
- Born: 2 September 1812
- Died: 18 September 1875 (aged 63)
- Occupations: Soldier, explorer
- Known for: Exploration in south of Western Australia
- Children: Sir Henry Charles John Bunbury, 10th Baronet
- Parents: Sir Henry Bunbury, 7th Baronet; Louisa Amelia Fox

Colonel Henry William St Pierre Bunbury CB (2 September 1812 – 18 September 1875) was a British Army officer who served for periods in Australia, South Africa, and India.

== Early life ==
Bunbury was the son of Lt.-Gen. Sir Henry Bunbury, 7th Baronet, who served as Under-Secretary of State for War and the Colonies. His mother, Louisa Amelia, was the daughter of Henry Edward Fox and the granddaughter of Henry Fox, 1st Baron Holland. Bunbury's brothers, Sir Charles and Sir Edward, had prominent careers of their own.

At the age of 18, Bunbury was commissioned as an ensign in the 43rd Regiment of Foot. He was promoted to lieutenant in 1833 and transferred to the 21st Regiment of Foot. Bunbury was then sent out to Australia, stationed in New South Wales from 1834 to 1835, Van Diemen's Land from 1835 to 1836, and Western Australia from 1836 to 1837. In New South Wales, he served as aide-de-camp to Sir Richard Bourke, the Governor of New South Wales.

== Colony of Western Australia ==
Bunbury arrived in the Colony of Western Australia in March 1836, and was sent by Governor James Stirling to explore the districts around Williams and Busselton and establish outposts. He kept a detailed diary, which provides valuable information about pre-settlement Aboriginal customs. One of the townships that Stirling had him establish was named Bunbury in his honour, and is now Western Australia's third-largest city.

In July 1836 Bunbury was sent to York "to make war upon the native" and by 1837 around one third of the Swan River colony's troops were stationed in the York and Toodyay area. In July 1836 Bunbury wrote "I do not find the life very pleasant. I hope, however, it will not last very long as the Natives seem inclined to be quiet since I shot a few of them one night." On 9 July 1836 The Perth Gazette reported a rumour of an attack in the York area of a night attack on Ballardong Noongar people in which several were wounded and a woman was killed.

In September 1836, Arthur Trimmer, the farming business partner of the resident magistrate Revett Henry Bland, got his servant Ned Gallop to hide in the loft of their barn with his guns waiting for Noongar men who were stealing flour. One "fine young" Noongar man was "wantonly" shot dead while walking away and two others were injured. Bunbury was sent again to York to keep the peace and wrote: Trimmer's "character never could recover from this foul stain". In retaliation a shepherd called Knott was speared by Ballardong warriors Wainupwort and Dyott, an incident which Bunbury investigated with Bland. This incident resulted in more punitive action from troops led by Bunbury. By October 1836 Bunbury was back in Perth and was then sent down to the Vasse area.

In July 1837 Bunbury was again sent to the York area after two colonial settlers Peter Chidlow and Edward Jones were speared by a group of around 40 Ballardong warriors after the arrest of two Noongar men, Durgap and his son Garbung, for stealing. They had been taken to Perth for punishment and the Ballardong people thought they would be killed without trial, like Midgegooroo had been. Stirling sent Bunbury and extra troops to York with instructions to make "proper examples of Severity to the full extent to which the Law warrants in such cases" so that "the natives may be deterred from the Commission of further outrage". In his notebook titled "Odds and Ends", Bunbury noted the names of eighteen Ballardong people killed by himself, soldiers of the 21st Regiment and settlers during the following months.

== South Africa and India ==
Leaving Western Australia in November 1837, Bunbury went to South Africa, where he was aide-de-camp to the Governor of the Cape Colony, Sir George Napier. He married Napier's daughter Cecilia in November 1852, and they had four children together. Bunbury served on the North-West Frontier of India and in the Crimean War before retiring in 1862. He retired with the rank of colonel, and was admitted into the Order of the Bath.

== See also ==
- Sir Henry Charles John Bunbury, 10th Baronet - eldest son

== General references ==
- Kennedy, Sharon (9 June 2014). "Bunbury was named after a young man who was ahead of his time". Australian Broadcasting Corporation. Archived from the original on 30 September 2023.

== Sources ==
- Bunbury, Henry William St Pierre; Morrell, William Parker, eds. (1930), Early days in Western Australia: Being the letters and journal of Lieut. H.W. Bunbury, 21st fusiliers (PDF), London: Oxford University Press, OCLC 221171847, Wikidata Q136431240
- Cammilleri, Cara (1966). "Henry William St Pierre Bunbury (1812–1875)". Australian Dictionary of Biography. Vol. 1. National Centre of Biography, Australian National University. ISBN 978-0-522-84459-7. ISSN 1833-7538. OCLC 70677943.
- Statham Drew, Pamela (2003). James Stirling: Admiral and Founding Governor of Western Australia. Crawley: UWA Publishing. ISBN 978-1-876268-94-7. LCCN 2003464253. OL 3760974M. Wikidata Q136431983.
