= Nuts in May (rhyme) =

Nursery rhyme

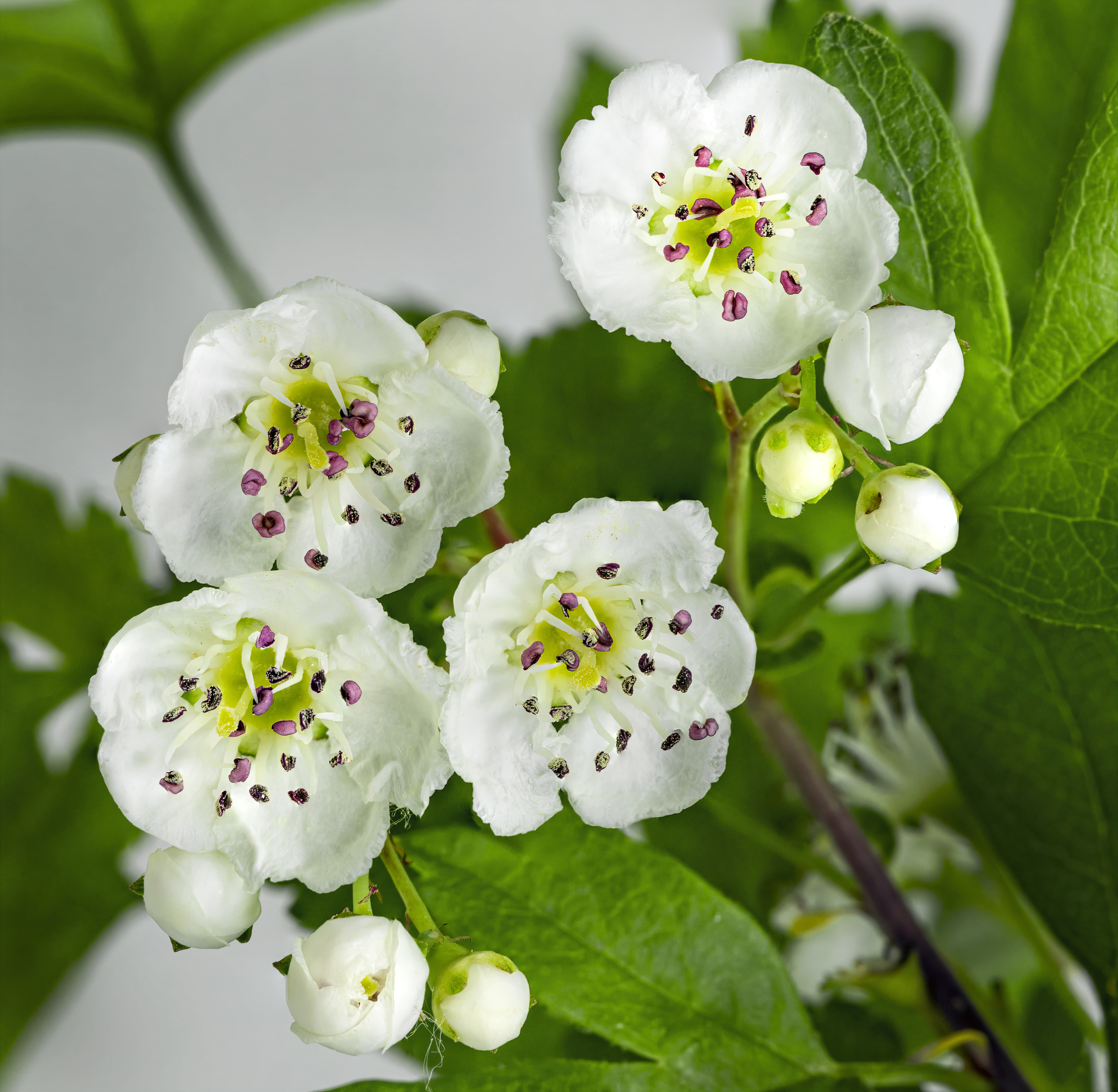
- Hawthorn blossom or "knots of may"
- Writers: Unknown
- Publication: 1894–1898
- Genres: Game

"Nuts in May" is a singing game played by children with the aim of pairing a boy and girl from within two teams of participants. It was first recorded in the second half of the 19th century and has Roud Folk Song Index 6308.

== The game ==
According to S. Brewer (2009), the game has two teams of children, who face each other in a line and the first team skips forward singing the opening stanza:

Here we come gathering nuts in May,

nuts in May, nuts in May.

Here we come gathering nuts in May,

on a cold and frosty morning.

They then skip back to their original position and the second team skips towards them repeating a verse in the same form but beginning, “Who will you have for nuts in May?” After the first team has made its choice, they sing “We'll have [name] for nuts in May” and the second team asks next “Who will you send to fetch [him/her] away?” The first team then sings the final stanza:

We'll send [name] to fetch [him/her] away,

fetch [him/her] away, fetch [him/her] away.

We'll send [name] to fetch [him/her] away,

on a cold and frosty morning.

The children chosen then advance to the centre, take hands and try to pull each other towards their own side. The loser has to join the winner's row and the game begins again. In form, the song is close to "Here We Go Round the Mulberry Bush"; it shares the same tune and the same final line.

== Origins ==
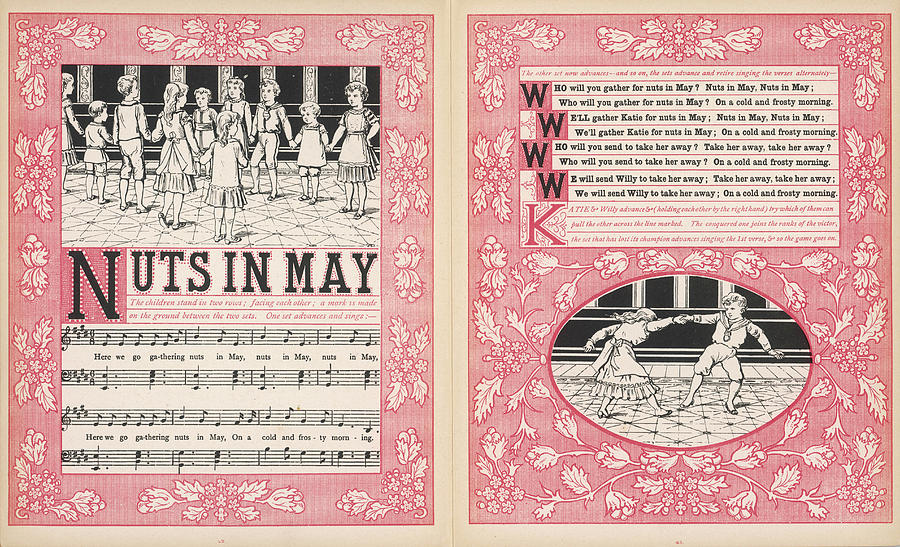
The words, rules and tune for "Here we go gathering nuts in May"

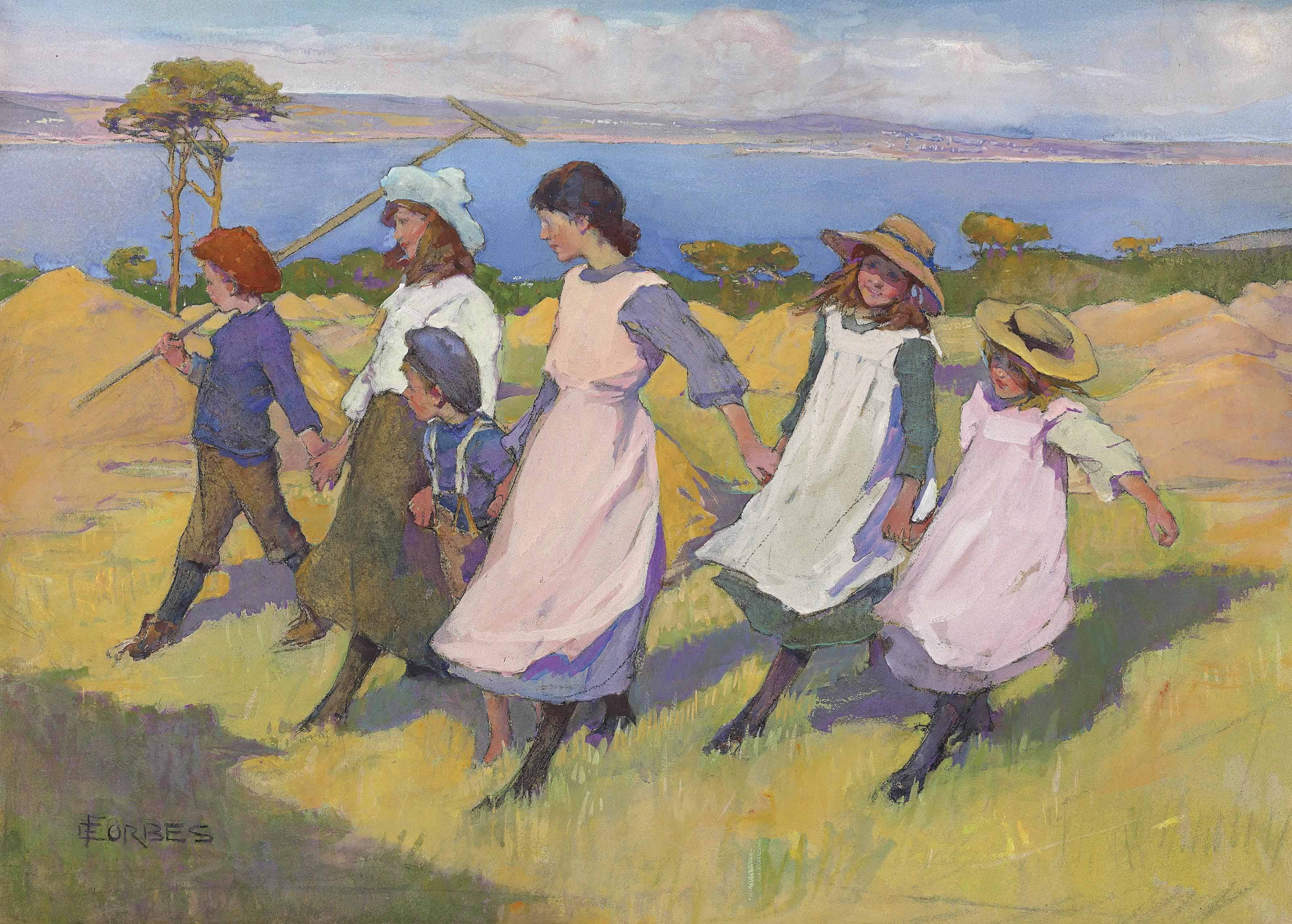
Here we are gathering nuts in May; by Elizabeth Adela Forbes

The words and rules of the game were first quoted in the Folk-Lore Record, E. Carrington (1881), followed by a similar description among the games for choosing partners by G.F. Northall (1882). Carrington described the game as played among girls, while Northall says that a girl and a boy are partnered between the participating teams. There are mixed teams also in the description given by E.M. Plunket (1886), who also supplies the music to the words.

Although the rhyme was also known in the U.S. at the same period, it is described as “probably a recent importation from England” by W.W. Newell (1884). Texts were also recorded later in Canada (W.J. Wintemberg, et al., 1918), among black children in Jamaica (M.W. Beckwith, 1922), and as also being found in New Zealand (Sutton-Smith, 1953).

One of the most comprehensive descriptions given to the game was by A.B. Gomme (1894-1898) who reported variant versions collected from around Britain and Ireland, and speculated on the origin of the game.

Since nuts are green in the spring, what is supposed to be gathered is particularly questionable, or a paradoxical joke. Gomme’s preference for the original wording is "knots (flower posies) of may-[blossoms]", in which she follows Northall's suggestions, and refers the game to former May Day ceremonies – which took place early in the morning. The alternative lines "On a fine summer’s morning" and "So early in the morning", as well as Newell’s "On a May morning early", all in place of "On a cold and frosty morning", seem to suggest this.

R. Herrick’s c. 1648? poem “Corinna’s going a’ Maying”, with its references to gathering white-thorn blossoms, and choosing a marriage partner, describes 17th century rural customs that might lie at the base of what eventually has become a childhood game. Gomme also pointed out that the pairing that went on then was often less than innocent, a connection hinted at in the more recent drinking song:

I took to gathering nuts in May,

nuts in May, nuts in May,
down by the old mill stream.

But instead of gathering nuts in May,

I put her in a family way,
down by the old mill stream.
