= Sir Henry Charles John Bunbury, 10th Baronet =

British Royal Navy officer

Henry Bunbury
- Born: Henry Charles John Bunbury; 9 January 1855; London, England
- Died: 18 December 1930 (aged 75); Mildenhall, Suffolk, England

Sir Henry Charles John Bunbury, 10th Baronet (9 January 1855 - 1930) was a former Royal Navy officer and a country gentleman.

== Early life ==
Bunbury was born on 9 January 1855, the son of Colonel Henry William St Pierre Bunbury and educated at Magdalene College, Cambridge.

== Military and civic service ==
Bunbury joined the Royal Navy in 1869. During the First World War he commanded a company of the Suffolk Volunteer Battalion.

On the death of his Uncle Edward Bunbury in 1895 he succeeded to the Baronetcy. He was appointed High Sheriff of Suffolk for 1908 and a Deputy Lieutenant of Suffolk.

== Family life ==
Bunbury married Laura Wood in 1884 and they had two sons and a daughter. He died aged 75 at his home, Manor House, Mildenhall, on 18 December 1930 and was succeeded in the Baronetcy by his eldest son Charles.

Baronetage of England
Preceded by Edward Bunbury	Baronet (of Stanney Hall); 1895–1930	Succeeded by Charles Bunbury
