= Henry Bunbury (caricaturist) =

English caricaturist (1750–1811)

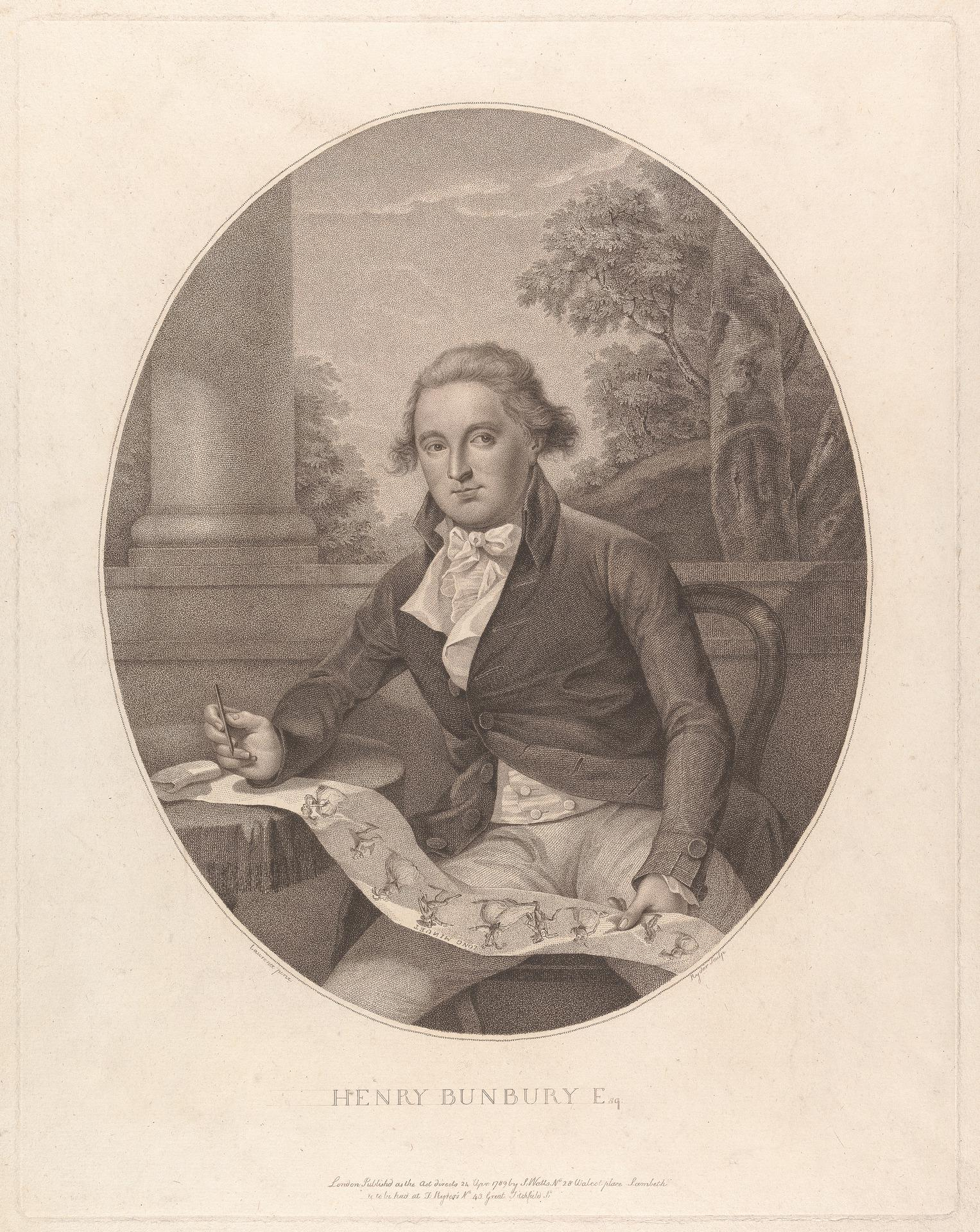
- Born: 1 July 1750; Manor House, Mildenhall, Suffolk, England
- Died: 7 May 1811 (aged 60); Keswick, Cumbria, England
- Education: St Catharine's College, Cambridge
- Notable work: La cuisine de la poste; A Long Minuet as Danced at Bath
- Style: caricature
- Spouse: Catherine Horneck
- Children: 2, including Henry
- Relatives: Bunbury baronets

Henry William Bunbury (1 July 1750 – 7 May 1811) was an English caricaturist. The second son of Sir William Bunbury, 5th Baronet (see Bunbury baronets), of Mildenhall, Suffolk, he came of an old Norman family. He was educated at Westminster School and St Catharine's College, Cambridge, and soon showed a talent for drawing, especially for humorous subjects. He temporarily left Cambridge to embark on a tour of Europe, during which time he may have studied in Rome; he returned to school in 1771 but is not known to have completed a degree. His European travels inspired a series of caricatures mocking foreigners, notably his La Cuisine de la Poste, exhibited at the Royal Academy in 1770.

His more serious efforts were no great success, but his caricatures are as famous as those of his contemporaries Thomas Rowlandson and James Gillray, good examples being his A Long Story (1782), Country Club (1788), and Barber's Shop (1803). Most of his caricatures are described in detail in the Catalogue of Political and Personal Satires Preserved in the Department of Prints and Drawings in the British Museum. He was a popular character, and the friend of most of the notabilities of his day, whom he never offended by attempting political satire; his easy circumstances and social position (he was commissioned as lieutenant-colonel of the West Suffolk Militia on 26 August 1788, and was appointed equerry to the Duke of York and Albany in 1787) allowed him the leisure to practise his talents.

The Oxford Dictionary of National Biography describes his A Long Minuet as Danced at Bath as the most successful of his lifetime, using an "innovative story-telling" format that is considered a forerunner to the comic strip. His caricatures were regularly reissued, even as he turned his attention to other subjects: he finished half of a commissioned set of 48 drawings of Shakespearean works before abandoning the series in 1796, and after the death of his wife and eldest son he took up oil painting.

In August 1771 he married Catherine, eldest daughter of Kane William Horneck (an officer in the Royal Engineers) and his wife Hannah Muggles. Bunbury and Catherine's second son Henry Bunbury succeeded to the baronetcy.

== Gallery ==
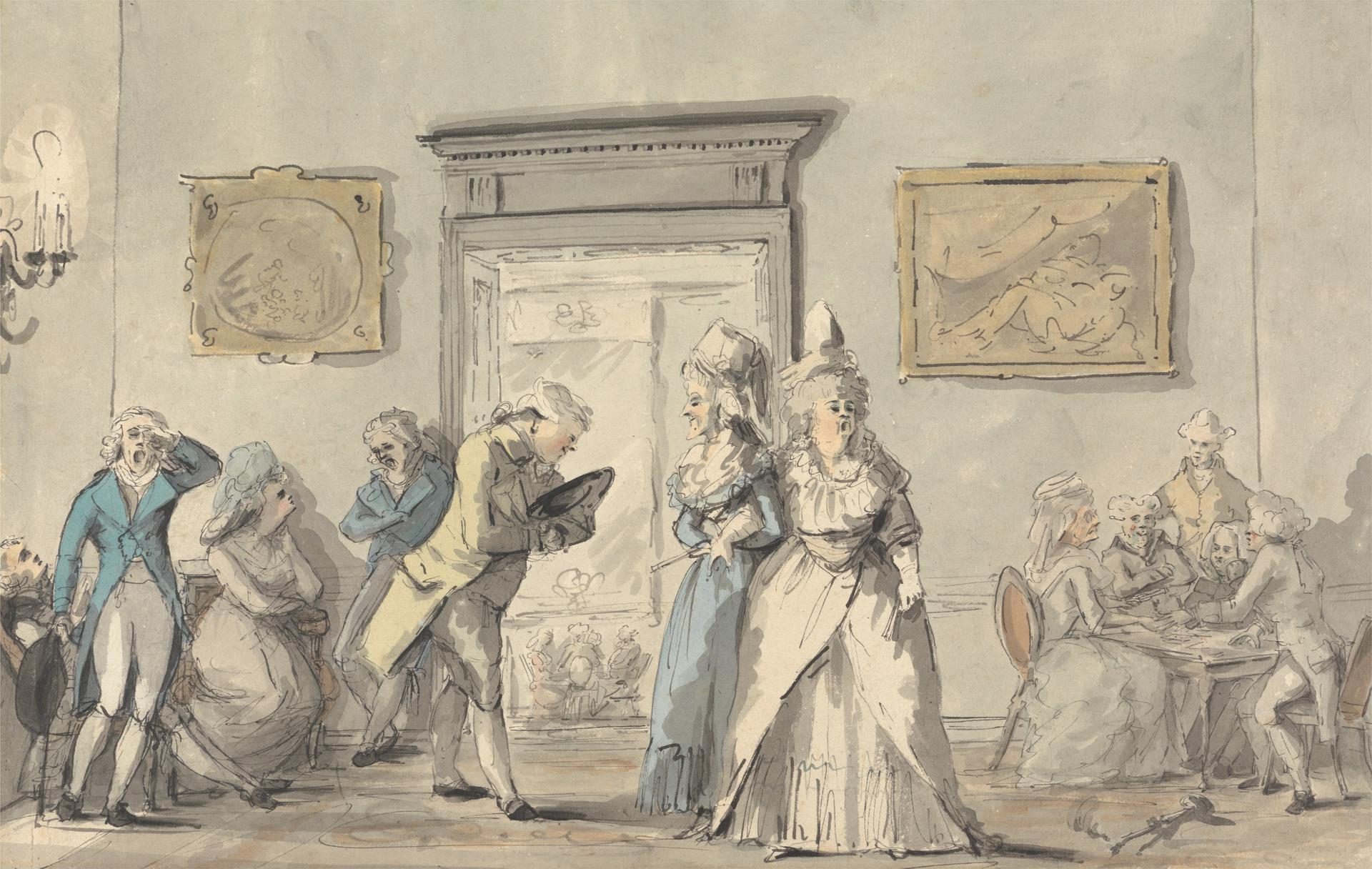
A Soiree, watercolor, pen and black ink on medium, cream wove paper, Yale Center for British Art

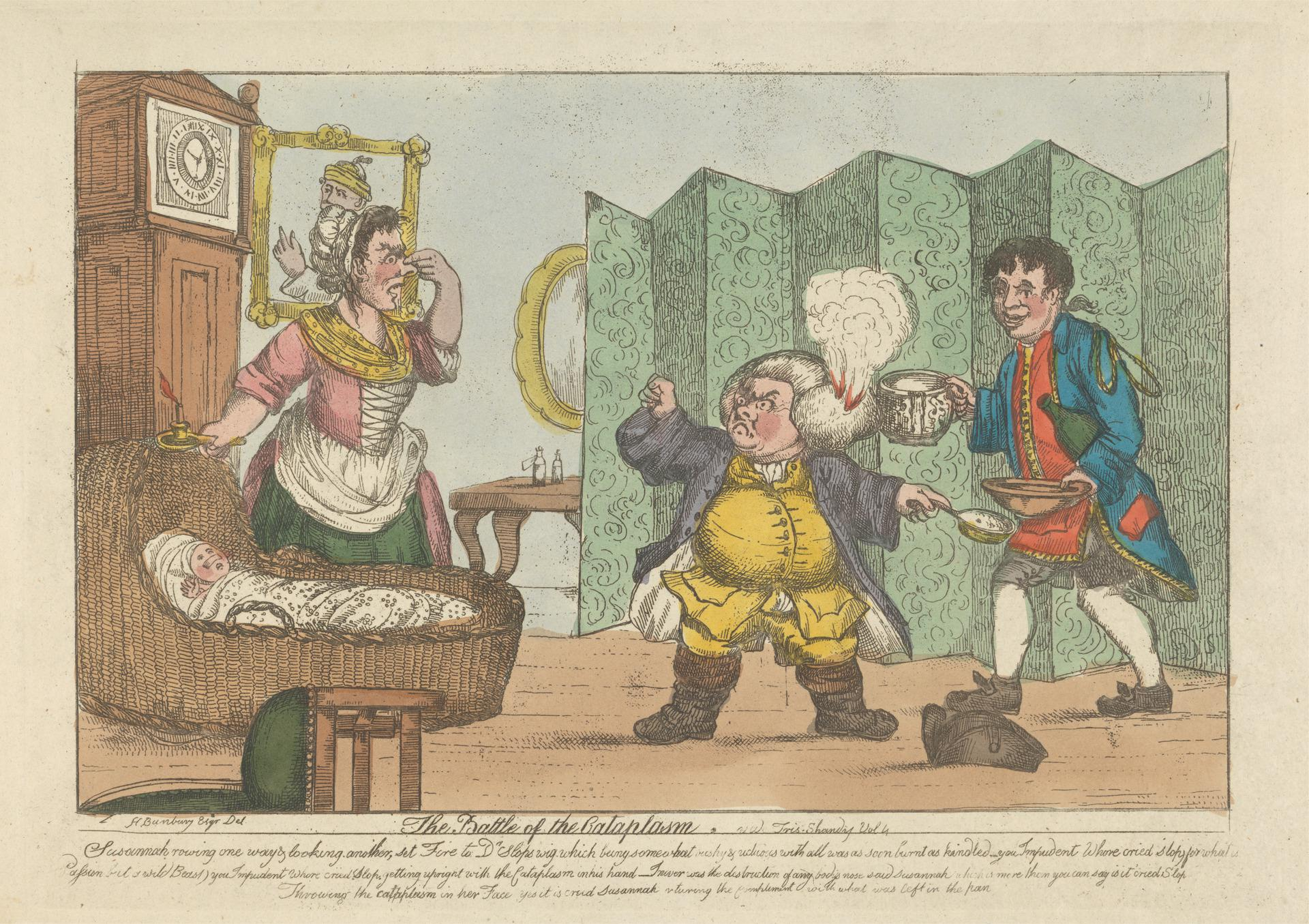
The Battle of the Cataplasm, hand-colored etching on cream wove paper, Yale Center of British Art

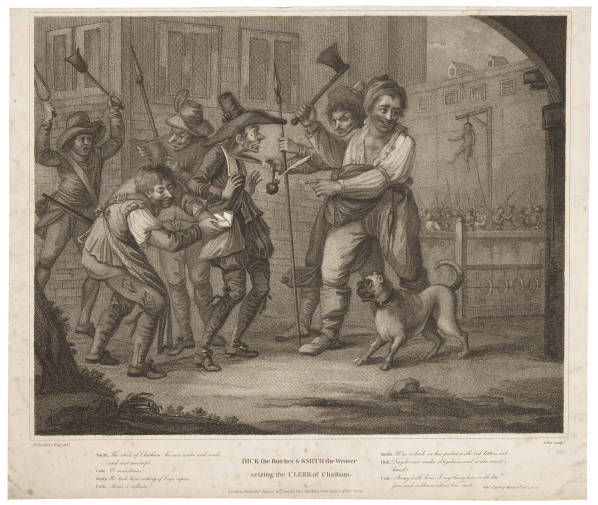
A Barber's Shop, copperplate engraving, 1803

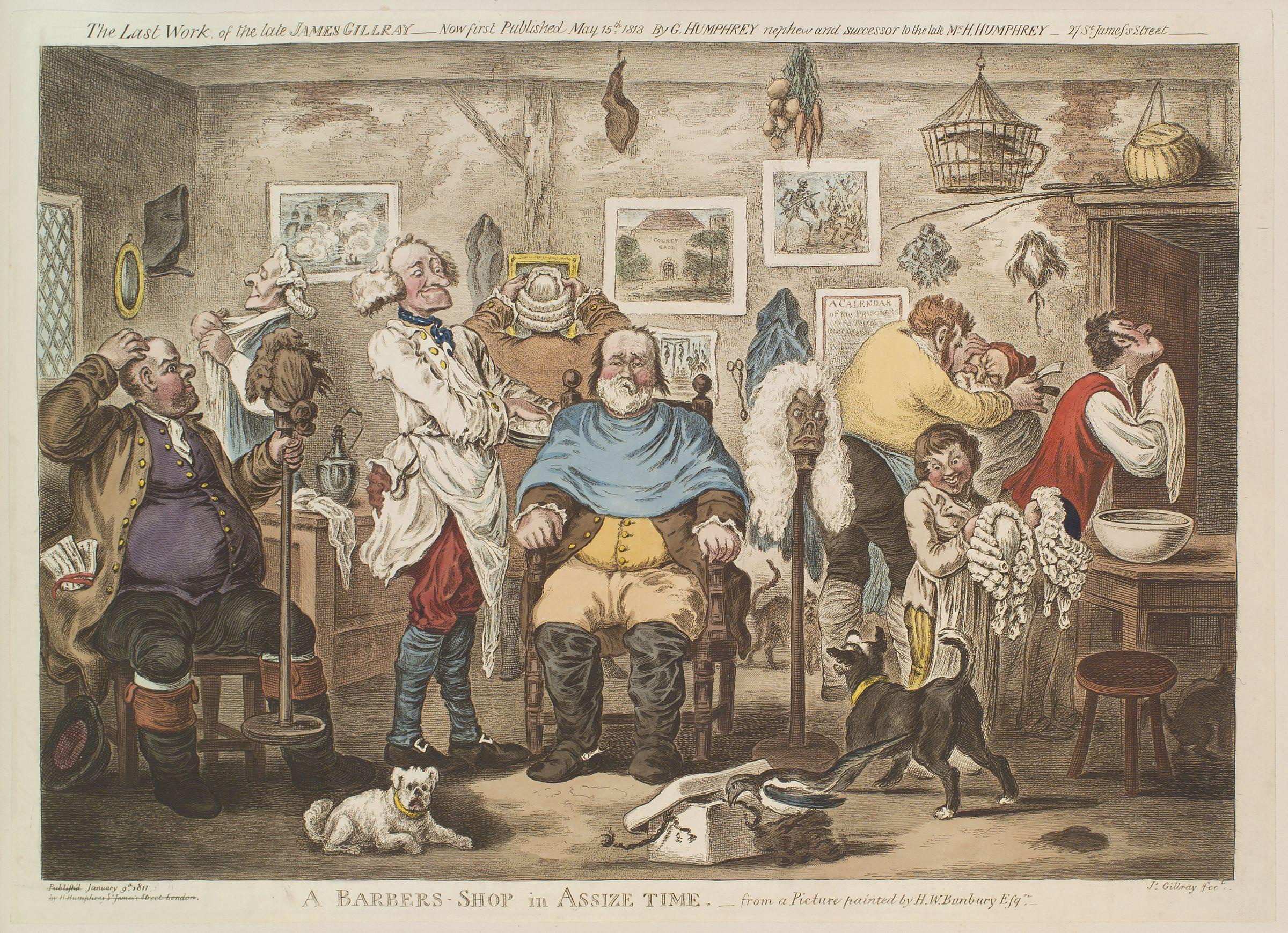
A Barbers Shop in Assize Time, hand-coloured etching and stipple engraving, 1818, National Portrait Gallery, London
