= Nancy Dawson =

English dancer and actress

- Nancy Dawson, mezzotint portrait, by James Watson after Charles Spooner, (NPG, London, Inv. D14527)
- Born: Ann Newton; Circa 1730; London, England or Axminster, Devon
- Died: 26 May 1767; Haverstock Hill, London
- Occupations: Actress and dancer
- Spouse: James Dawson (married 1 January 1753)

Nancy Dawson was the stage name of Ann Newton (c.1728-1767), an English dancer and actress. She rose to fame performing a solo rendition of a hornpipe between acts in The Beggar's Opera at Covent Garden Theatre in London in 1759. The hornpipe tune is now known as "Here We Go Round the Mulberry Bush".

== Life ==
One account says Nancy Dawson was born in London in 1730 'within a musket shot of Clare Market', then a sleazy area off the Strand. Her father is said to have been 'a pimp and a porter' while her mother sold vegetables from a stall in Covent Garden. Another source says she may have been born at Axminster, Devon. She was a pretty vivacious child and went about every tavern and coffee house picking up money by 'showing her tricks'. At sixteen she joined the company of William Griffin, an itinerant puppet-showman, who taught her to dance and set up Skittles in taverns. She met a figure dancer of Sadler's Wells named John Walker who, seeing her performance, found her a place at his own theatre. As the story goes, her figure, novelty and technical excellence made her career and she earned between 10 and 12 shillings a night.

It is widely reported that during this time Nancy frequented the bordello operated by Mrs Weatherby at Ben Johnson's Head (more commonly known as 'Weatherby's) in Little Russell Street, near Drury Lane, Covent Garden where she would entertain the customers by playing the tabor and a drum.

In her second summer season at Sadler's Wells Nancy Dawson was promoted to the part of Columbine, and in February 1758 she made her first appearance at Covent Garden Theatre under Edward Shuter (with whom she had a much publicised affair), in The Prophetess by Thomas Betterton. On 22 April 1758 the Merry Wives of Windsor was played for her benefit. In October 1759, during the run of the John Gay's Beggar's Opera, the man who danced the hornpipe among the thieves fell ill, and his place was taken by Nancy Dawson. Her hornpipe was apparently so enchantingly lascivious that Nancy became a celebrity overnight and was 'vastly celebrated [and] imitated by all'. The production enjoyed an unusually long run, and the house was crowded nightly. The tune of her signature hornpipe was said to be by Thomas Arne and is known now as "Here We Go Round the Mulberry Bush".

Nancy Dawson was induced by an increase of salary to move to Drury Lane, where she appeared for the first time on 23 September 1760 in the Beggar's Opera. Here for the next three years she danced in its frequent revivals, and in a variety of Christmas entertainments, such as ‘Harlequin's Invasion,’ ‘Fortunatus,’ and the ‘Enchanter’ in which there also appeared the elder Joseph Grimaldi and the Miss Baker who succeeded Nancy Dawson in popular favour as a dancer. In April and May 1761, Nancy played benefit performances at Drury Lane at the request of the Aga Hamid, Ambassador of Tripolitania. On Christmas Eve 1763 a pantomime called the ‘Rites of Hecate’ was produced at Drury Lane, and on that day and the 26th of the month Nancy Dawson appeared; but her name is absent from the bills of subsequent representations. Throughout her seven year dancing career Nancy was still to be found frequenting the bagnios and taverns of Covent Garden including the Rose, the Bedford Head and Maltby's Coffee House.

Between 1758 and 1763 Nancy Dawson shared lodgings in fashionable Manchester Square with the courtesan Polly Kennedy. When their home was destroyed by fire, they moved to Bedford Street in Covent Garden. Edward Thompson wrote in ‘The Meretriciad’ (1765 edition) that Nancy was 'still tripping it merrily ... despite her obesity'. Nancy eventually moved to Haverstock Hill, Hampstead, where she lived next door to her friend and mentor Moll King.

She died at Haverstock Hill on 26 May 1767. She was buried in the graveyard belonging to the parish of St George the Martyr, Bloomsbury, behind the Foundling Hospital. Her street was known for many years as Dawson Terrace, in her honor, but is now part of Haverstock Hill.

== Ballad ==
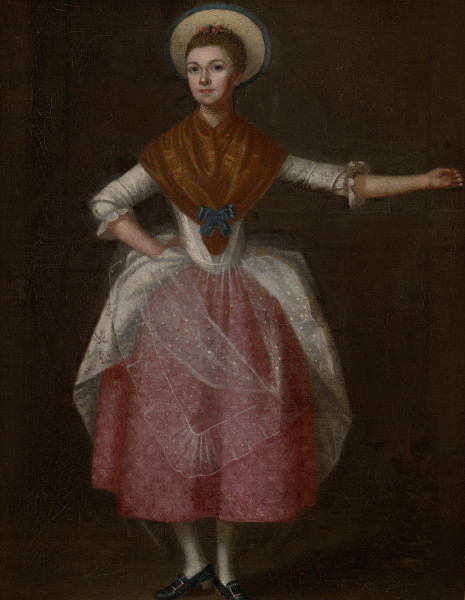
Nancy Dawson probably by Samuel De Wilde

Worcester porcelain mug printed in black with Nancy Dawson dancing the hornpipe, circa 1770 (Bonhams )

The hornpipe by which she danced into fame was performed to a tune (thought to be probably by Thomas Arne) which then had words set, a song called Ballad of Nancy Dawson attributed to George Alexander Stevens. It was for a long time the popular air of the day. It was set with variations for the harpsichord as Miss Dawson's hornpipe, was introduced in Carey's and Bickerstaffe's opera ‘Love in a Village,’ and is mentioned as ‘Nancy Dawson’ by Oliver Goldsmith in the epilogue to She Stoops to Conquer.

The Ballad of Nancy Dawson

Of all the girls in our town,
The red, the black, the fair, the brown,
That dance and prance it up and down,
There's none like Nancy Dawson.

Her easy mien, her shape so neat,
She foots, she trips, she looks so sweet;
Her every motion’s so complete,
I die for Nancy Dawson.

See how she comes to give surprise,
With joy and pleasure in her eyes:
To give delight she always tries,
So means my Nancy Dawson.

Was there no task, t’obstruct the way,
No shutter old, no house so gay,
A bet of fifty pounds I’d lay,
That I gained Nancy Dawson.

See how the opera takes a run
Exceeding Hamlet, Lear and Lun
Though in it there would be no fun,
Was’t not for Nancy Dawson.

Though beard and brent charm ev’ry night
And female peachum’s justly right,
And filch and lockit please the sight,
‘Tis kept by Nancy Dawson.

See little davey strut and puff,
‘Confound the opera and such stuff,
My house is never full enough,
A curse on Nancy Dawson”.

Though G[arric]k he has had his day
And forced the town his laws t’obey,
With Jonny Rich is come in play,
With the help of Nancy Dawson.

== In literature ==
Staffordshire enamel snuff box decorated with a portrait of Nancy Dawson, circa 1760.

In Patrick O'Brian's Aubrey–Maturin novels, one of the great guns on HMS Surprise is named “Nancy Dawson”, and in the 1984 novel The Far Side of the World the hands are piped to noon grog to the song of the same name.

== Portraits of Nancy Dawson ==
As soon as Nancy Dawson achieved fame, her image was in great demand from London printsellers. A series of engravings were rapidly produced that were copied from Joshua Reynolds' portrait of the courtesan Kitty Fisher with the addition of the straw that that formed part of Nancy Dawson's stage costume. Dawson's image was widely used to decorate luxury and other objects whilst she was at the height of her fame including tiles and Staffordshire enamel boxes and etuis.
