= William FitzGerald-de Ros, 22nd Baron de Ros =

British Army general

General The Right Honourable The Lord de Ros PC DL
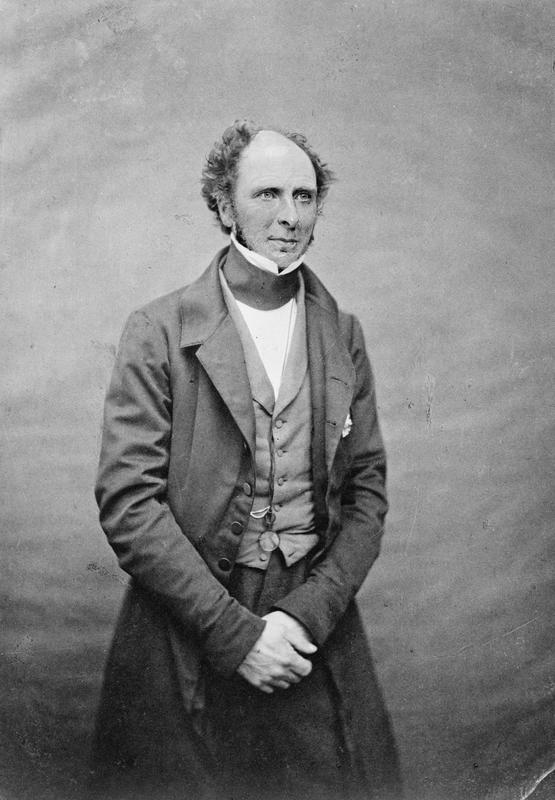

Captain of the Yeomen of the Guard
- In office 27 February 1852 – 17 December 1852
- Monarch: Queen Victoria
- Prime Minister: The Earl of Derby
- Preceded by: The Marquess of Donegall
- Succeeded by: The Viscount Sydney
- In office 17 March 1858 – 11 June 1859
- Monarch: Queen Victoria
- Prime Minister: The Earl of Derby
- Preceded by: The Viscount Sydney
- Succeeded by: The Earl of Ducie

Personal details
- Born: 1 September 1797 Thames Ditton, Surrey
- Died: 6 January 1874 (aged 76) Old Court, Strangford, County Down
- Party: Conservative
- Spouse(s): Lady Georgiana Lennox (1795–1891)

William Lennox Lascelles FitzGerald-de Ros, 22nd Baron de Ros of Helmsley, PC, DL (1 September 1797 – 6 January 1874) was a British soldier and Conservative politician. A general in the Army, he also held political office as Captain of the Yeomen of the Guard in 1852 and between 1858 and 1859.

== Background ==
FitzGerald-de Ros was born into an Anglo-Irish aristocratic family at Thames Ditton, Surrey, the third son of Lord Henry FitzGerald, fourth son of the 1st Duke of Leinster and Lady Emily Lennox. His paternal uncle was Lord Edward FitzGerald, the Irish revolutionary. His mother was Charlotte FitzGerald-de Ros, 20th Baroness de Ros, while Henry FitzGerald-de Ros, 21st Baron de Ros, was his elder brother. He matriculated at Christ Church, Oxford in 1815, graduating B.A. in 1819 and M.A. in 1822.

== Military career ==
As a younger son, de Ros embarked upon a military career, joining the Life Guards as a cornet on 29 March 1819. He subsequently became a lieutenant on 24 August 1821, a captain on 23 October 1824, a major on 5 June 1827 and a lieutenant-colonel on 8 September 1831. In July 1835, de Ros and the Earl of Durham travelled to the Black Sea for half a year to investigate Russian military preparations. He was appointed a Gentleman Usher Quarter Waiter to Queen Victoria in 1836, but had surrendered the post by 1839, when he inherited the barony of de Ros on the death of his eldest brother (a middle brother, Arthur, had predeceased them). He became a colonel on 9 November 1846, and was appointed Deputy Lieutenant of the Tower of London on 13 February 1852.

Lord de Ros served as Quartermaster-General for the British Army in Turkey during the Crimean War between April and July 1854, being promoted major-general on 20 June 1854. Due to a severe attack of fever in July, he was forced to return home as the army embarked for the Crimea. He was promoted lieutenant-general on 12 March 1861, appointed colonel of the 4th (Queen's Own) Hussars on 6 February 1865, and promoted general on 10 November 1868.

== Political career ==
In February 1852 Lord de Ros was appointed Captain of the Yeomen of the Guard in the Earl of Derby's first administration, and sworn of the Privy Council. The government fell in December 1852, but when Derby returned to office in February 1858, de Ros was once again made Captain of the Yeomen of the Guard. He continued in this post until Derby resigned in June 1859.

== Family ==
Lord de Ros married his second cousin Lady Georgiana Lennox (Molecombe, Sussex, 30 September 1795 – London, 15 December 1891), daughter of Charles Lennox, 4th Duke of Richmond, his father's first cousin, in London on 7 June 1824. They had three children:

- Hon. Frances Charlotte FitzGerald-de Ros (1825– 21 February 1851), unmarried and without issue.
- Dudley FitzGerald-de Ros, 23rd Baron de Ros (1827–1907).
- Hon. Blanche Arthur Georgina FitzGerald-de Ros (1832 – 10 March 1910), married on 11 July 1865 James Rannie Swinton (see Clan Swinton) (died December 1888, also without issue).

Lord de Ros died at Old Court, Strangford, County Down, in January 1874, aged 76, and was succeeded in the barony by his only son, Dudley. Lady de Ros died in London in December 1891, aged 96.

Military offices
Preceded by Sir James Hope Grant	Colonel of the 4th (Queen's Own) Hussars; 1865–1874	Succeeded by Lord George Paget
Political offices
Preceded by The Marquess of Donegall	Captain of the Yeomen of the Guard; 1852	Succeeded by The Viscount Sydney
Preceded by The Viscount Sydney	Captain of the Yeomen of the Guard; 1858–1859	Succeeded by The Earl of Ducie
Peerage of England
Preceded by Henry FitzGerald-de Ros	Baron de Ros; 1839–1874	Succeeded by Dudley FitzGerald-de Ros
