= Henry FitzGerald =

Henry FitzGerald may refer to

- Henry FitzGerald, 12th Earl of Kildare (1562–97)
- Lord Henry FitzGerald (1761–1829) Irish MP and Privy Councillor
- Henry FitzGerald-de Ros, 21st Baron de Ros (1793–1839) son of Lord Henry FitzGerald, MP for West Looe
- Henry fitzGerold (died c. 1174), Anglo-Norman official

== See also ==
- Thomas Henry FitzGerald (1824–88) Australian sugar cane farmer
- Fitzgerald Henry aka "the Mighty Terror" (1921–2007) Trinidadian calypso singer
