= Charles FitzGerald, 1st Baron Lecale =

Irish naval commander and politician (1756–1810)

Rear-Admiral Charles James FitzGerald, 1st Baron Lecale, PC (Ire) (30 June 1756 – 18 February 1810), styled Lord Charles FitzGerald between 1761 and 1800, was an Irish naval commander and politician.

== Background ==
FitzGerald was the third son of James FitzGerald, 1st Duke of Leinster, and Lady Emily, daughter of Charles Lennox, 2nd Duke of Richmond and the second of the famous Lennox Sisters. He was the brother of William FitzGerald, 2nd Duke of Leinster, Lord Henry FitzGerald and Lord Edward FitzGerald. Through his mother he was a great-great-grandson of King Charles II. There were 19 children in his family. His sister Lady Charlotte FitzGerald took the title of Baroness Rayleigh in 1821. His brother Lord Edward FitzGerald is known as the famous Irish revolutionary. One of his numerous brothers was Lord Robert Stephen FitzGerald who is known to be a British diplomat in Switzerland 1792–1795.

== Political and naval career ==
FitzGerald sat as a Member of Parliament (MP) in the Irish House of Commons for County Kildare from 1776 to 1790, for Cavan Borough from 1790 to 1798 and for Ardfert from 1798 to the Act of Union in 1801. He served as High Sheriff of Down in 1783, a Commissioner of Customs between 1789 and 1792 and as Muster-Master-General of Ireland between 1792 and 1806.

He also served in the Royal Navy. He was commissioned as a lieutenant in 1777, and his first command was the cutter Tapageur in 1779. He sailed her to Saint Lucia, where she was wrecked in March 1780, though without loss of life. He was made post-captain on 23 May 1780. Thereafter he was captain of a number of frigates, and fought in the action of 4 February 1781. He participated in the Battle of the Chesapeake in 1781. He was made a Rear-Admiral in 1790.

On 27 December 1800, he was raised to the Peerage of Ireland as Baron Lecale, of Ardglass in the County of Down. He briefly represented Arundel in the British House of Commons between January and April 1807.

== Family ==
Lord Lecale was twice married, the second time in London on 18 July 1808 to former Mrs. Julia Carton (died Courtlands, Devon, 6 May 1844), without issue. His only children, both illegitimate, were Henry FitzGerald, who died at sea, off Civitavecchia, on 14 September 1803, and Anna Maria FitzGerald. Lecale converted 15th century warehouses in Ardglass, County Down into a castellated house, known as Ardglass Castle, at the end of the 18th century. The castle is now the home of Ardglass Golf Club. He died in the Castle in February 1810, aged 53, when the barony became extinct. Lord Lecale's tomb is located in Bright parish church, which bears a memorial plate in his name.

== Notes ==
Parliament of Ireland
Preceded by Sir Kildare Borrowes, 5th Bt; Arthur Pomeroy	Member of Parliament for County Kildare; 1776–1790; With: Arthur Pomeroy 1776–1783; John Wolfe 1783–1790	Succeeded by Lord Edward FitzGerald; Maurice Bagenal St Leger Keating
Preceded by Thomas Nesbitt; Henry Theophilus Clements	Member of Parliament for Cavan Borough; 1790–1798; With: Thomas Nesbitt	Succeeded by Thomas Nesbitt; Viscount Clements
Preceded by Robert Day; Arthur Wolfe	Member of Parliament for Ardfert; 1798–1801; With: Robert Day 1798; Lorenzo Moore 1798–1800; John Talbot 1800–1801	Succeeded by Parliament of the United Kingdom
Parliament of the United Kingdom
Preceded by Sir Arthur Piggott; Francis Wilder	Member of Parliament for Arundel; 1807; With: Sir Arthur Piggott	Succeeded by Sir Arthur Piggott; Francis Wilder
Peerage of Ireland
New creation	Baron Lecale; 1800–1810	Extinct
