= Lucy Anne FitzGerald =

Lady Lucy Anne FitzGerald Foley
- Born: Lucy Anne FitzGerald; 5 February 1771; Leinster House, Dublin
- Died: 20 January 1851 (aged 79); Marseille, France
- Known for: Activism
- Spouse: Thomas Foley (m. 1802)
- Parent(s): James FitzGerald, 1st Duke of Leinster and Lady Emily Fitzgerald
- Relatives: Lord Edward FitzGerald (brother)

Lady Lucy Anne FitzGerald (5 February 1771 – 20 January 1851) was an Anglo-Irish political radical: a supporter, with her mother Lady Emily, of her cousin, the English Whig reformer Charles James Fox and, with her brother Lord Edward, of the republican and democratic Society of United Irishmen.

== Life ==
Lucy Anne FitzGerald was born on 5 February 1771, most likely in Leinster House, Dublin. She was the 17th of the 19 children of James FitzGerald, 1st Duke of Leinster and Lady Emily Fitzgerald (née Lennox). After her father's death in 1774, her mother moved to France with Lucy and the younger children, where she married the children's tutor, William Ogilvie. In 1781, the family returned to Ireland, and later moved to London.

Both FitzGerald and her mother were supporters of her cousin, Charles James Fox, a radical Whig politician. She was also influenced by her brother, Lord Edward FitzGerald's political leanings which were both republican and pro-Catholic. During the period she spent in Ireland from October 1796 to May 1797, she met many of Edward's republican friends, including Arthur O'Connor. Until Edward's death in 1798, she kept a diary detailing her engagements and opinions on the Irish political upheaval of the time. Her diaries also provide an important factual account of Edward's movements, as she spent a great deal of time with his wife Pamela. Both of the women enjoyed French revolutionary songs and Irish jigs and shared in their support for the Society of United Irishmen. These views appear to have put off many potential suitors, a fact she seems to have revelled in. Her friends interpreted her reaction of FitzGerald to the arrest of Arthur O'Connor as a sign she was in love with him, and his imprisonment in Kilmainham Gaol resulted in the hardening of her radical republican beliefs. Letters from O'Connor to FitzGerald were smuggled out of the Gaol on the fly-leaf of a book. She campaigned in London for his release, and the pair met again before his arrest in March 1798 in Margate.

After her brother Edward's death on 4 June 1798, she wrote an open letter, To the Irish nation, in the hope of cementing his legacy and furthering the Irish republican cause. Her stepfather, Ogilvie, blocked its publication due to its incendiary contents. She also wrote to Thomas Paine. She continued to correspond with O'Connor while he was held in Fort George in Scotland in March 1799. Once again the letters are a record of his thoughts at the time, and the tensions within the United Irishmen movement.

FitzGerald married Captain Thomas Foley RN on 31 July 1802. The couple lived at his Carmarthenshire estate, and had no children. Following his death in 1833, she lived in Arundel. She cherished the memory of her brother Edward, and criticised the 1831 biography of Edward by Thomas Moore as an inaccurate portrayal of him. FitzGerald returned to Marseille, where she had lived as a child, in 1841. She died there on 20 January 1851.
