= Claudius Rich =

British business agent, traveller and antiquarian (1787–1821)

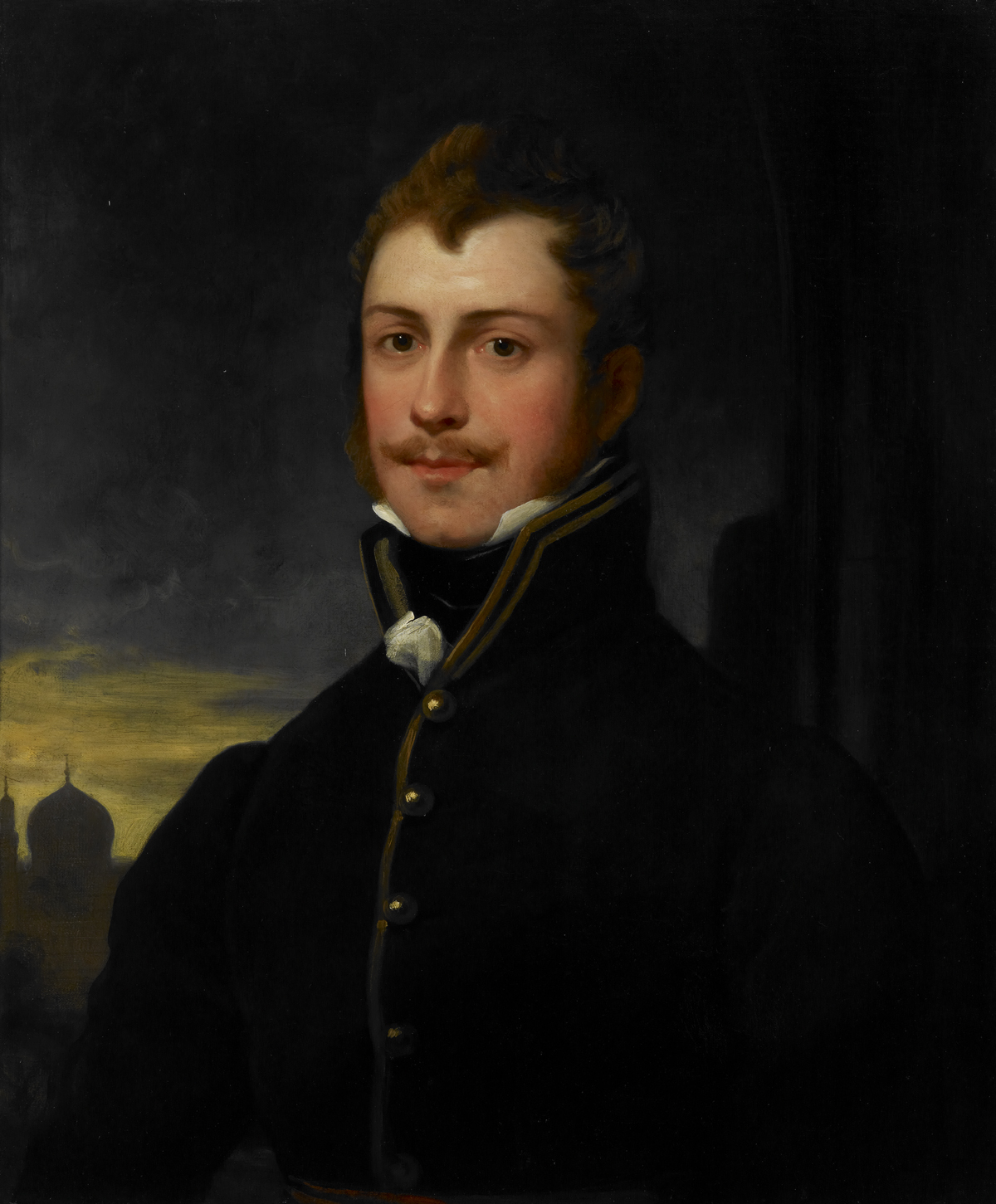
Claudius Rich

Claudius James Rich (28 March 1787 – 5 October 1821) was a British Assyriologist, business agent, traveller and antiquarian scholar.

== Biography ==
Rich was born near Dijon "of a good family", but passed his childhood at Bristol. Early on, he developed a gift for languages, becoming familiar not only with Latin and Greek but also with Hebrew, Syriac, Kurdish, Persian, Turkish and other Eastern tongues. In 1803, by the influence of friends, he was appointed a cadet in the East India Company's service.

The Company's directors were so much impressed by Rich's linguistic attainments that they presented him with a writership on the Bombay Presidency, and thus changed his career from the military to the civil side. At the same time he was provisionally attached as secretary to Charles Lock, who was proceeding to Egypt as consul-general, in order that he might improve his Arabic and Turkish under the consul's direction. Rich embarked early in 1804 in the Hindostan, which was wrecked, and Rich escaped to the Catalonian coast. Thence he made his way to Malta, after some stay in Italy, where he learnt to speak Italian, and devoted himself to music, of which he was passionately fond. Lock died before Rich could reach Egypt, and Rich, by permission of the directors, prosecuted his oriental studies at Constantinople and Smyrna, perfecting himself in Turkish.

Proceeding to Alexandria as assistant to Edward Missett, the new British consul-general there, he devoted himself to Arabic and its various dialects, and made himself master of Eastern manners and usages. On leaving Egypt he travelled by land to the Persian Gulf, disguised as a Mamluk, visiting Damascus, and entering the great mosque undetected. At Bombay, which he reached in September 1807, he was the guest of Sir James Mackintosh, whose eldest daughter Mary he married on 22 January 1808, proceeding soon after to Baghdad as the British Resident, a post he held for six years.

There he began his investigations into the geography, history and antiquities of the district. He explored the remains of Babylon, and projected a geographical and statistical account of the pashalic of Bagdad. The results of his work at Babylon appeared first in the Vienna serial Mines de l'orient, and in 1815 in London under the title Narrative of a Journey to the Site of Babylon in 1811.

In 1813 and 1814 Rich suffered some ill health, and he and his wife travelled to Constantinople, where they stayed with the ambassador Sir Robert Liston, and spent some time in Europe. On his return to Bagdad he devoted himself to the study of the geography of Asia Minor, and collected much information in Syriac and Chaldean Christian convents concerning the Yezidis. During this period he made a second excursion to Babylon, and in 1820 undertook an extensive tour of the Assyrian villages in the north of present-day Iraq, alongside al-Munshi al Baghdady—from Bagdad north to Sulaimaniya, eastward to Sinna, then west to Nineveh, and thence down the Tigris to Bagdad. The narrative of this journey, which contained the first accurate knowledge (from scientific observation) regarding the topography and geography of the region, was published by his widow under the title, Narrative of a Residence in Koordistan and on the site of Ancient Nineveh, etc. (London, 1836).

During his time in Baghdad it is recorded that "Mr Rich was universally considered to be the most powerful man in Baghdad; and some even questioned whether the Pasha himself would not shape his conduct according to Mr Rich's suggestions and advice rather than as his own council might wish."

In 1820 Rich went to Basra, whence he made an excursion to Shiraz, visiting the ruins of Persepolis and the other remains in the neighborhood. In the same year he went to Mosul and the site of ancient Nineveh, where he was told of a large relief panel that had been found and soon broken up. When his account was published in 1836 it represented the first Western inkling of the Assyrian palace reliefs that were to be discovered in the 1840s; he also brought back two small fragments.

He was then appointed to an important office at Bombay by Mountstuart Elphinstone, when he was attacked by cholera, during a visit to Shiraz, while exerting himself to help the sick and allay the panic among the inhabitants. He died on 5 October 1821 and was buried in the Jân Numâ, one of the royal gardens at Shiraz, in which he was living at the time of his death. In 1826 his remains were exhumed and reburied in the Armenian cathedral of Jolfa in Esfahan.

His collections were purchased by the trustees of the British Museum, and consisted of 'about nine hundred volumes of manuscripts in Arabic, Persian, and Turkish, and a great number in Chaldee and Syriac … highly rated by Mr. Colebrooke and Dr. Wilkins'; a large collection of coins, Greek and oriental; gems, and antiquities dug up at Babylon and Nineveh, including the first cuneiform inscriptions ever brought to Europe. Rich's portrait, presented to the British Museum by his widow Mary Mackintosh Rich, now hangs in the Asian and African Studies Reading Room of the British Library.

== Sources ==
Attribution:

- This article incorporates text from a publication now in the public domain: Lane-Poole, Stanley (1896). "Rich, Claudius James". In Lee, Sidney (ed.). Dictionary of National Biography. Vol. 48. London: Smith, Elder & Co. pp. 110–111.

== Bibliography ==
- Rich, Claudius James (1818), Memoir on the ruins of Babylon (3 ed.), Longman, Hurst, Rees, Orme, and Brown
- Rich, Claudius James (1818), Second memoir on Babylon : containing an inquiry into the correspondence between the ancient descriptions of Babylon and the remains still visible on the site, Longman, Hurst, Rees
- Rich, Claudius James (1836), Narrative of a residence in Koordistan, and on the site of ancient Nineveh: with journal of a voyage down the Tigris to Bagdad and an account of a visit to Shirauz and Persepolis, Volume 1, J. Duncan
- Rich, Claudius James (1836), Narrative of a residence in Koordistan, and on the site of ancient Nineveh: with journal of a voyage down the Tigris to Bagdad and an account of a visit to Shirauz and Persepolis, Volume 2, J. Duncan
- Company, East India (1836), The Asiatic journal and monthly miscellany, Volume 20, Wm. H. Allen & Co.
