= John Pomeroy (priest) =

Irish priest

John Pomeroy (1677–1725) was Archdeacon of Cork from 1717 until his death.

The son of Arthur Pomeroy, Dean of Cork, he was born in Cork and educated at Trinity College, Dublin. He held the living at Kilcully; and was Treasurer of Cork from 1710 to 1717.
