= John Boyle (MP) =

Member of Parliament for Cork City County Cork (1827 –1830)
- In office 4 December 1827 – 1832

Personal details
- Born: 13 March 1803 Frome, England
- Died: 6 December 1874 (age 70) Torquay, England
- Party: Whig
- Spouse: Cecilia FitzGerald-de Ros (m. 10 December 1835)
- Relations: Robert Edward Boyle (brother); Lord Henry FitzGerald (father-in-law)
- Parent: Edmund Boyle, 8th Earl of Cork
- Education: Winchester School; Christ Church, Oxford
- Profession: Politician

John Boyle (13 March 1803 – 6 December 1874) was a British politician in Ireland in the 19th century.

== Family ==
Boyle married Cecilia FitzGerald-de Ro the daughter of Lord Henry FitzGerald and his wife Charlotte FitzGerald-de Ros.
