= 85th Regiment of Foot (Westminster Volunteers) =

- Active: 1777–1783
- Country: Kingdom of Great Britain (1707–1800)
- Branch: British Army
- Type: Infantry

The 85th Regiment of Foot (Westminster Volunteers) was a short-lived infantry Regiment in the British Army which was raised in 1777 to provide garrison troops for the West Indies during the American Revolutionary War.

It was posted to Jamaica, where its numbers were ravaged by endemic diseases such as Yellow Fever. Many of survivors then perished in a storm off Newfoundland on their way home aboard the captured ship Ville de Paris in 1782. The remnants of the regiment were disbanded at Dover in 1783.

The Colonels of the Regiment were:

- 1778–1783: Gen. Charles Stanhope, 3rd Earl of Harrington, GCH
- 1783: Lt-Col. Lord Henry FitzGerald
