= Frescati House =

Demolished Georgian house in Dublin, Ireland

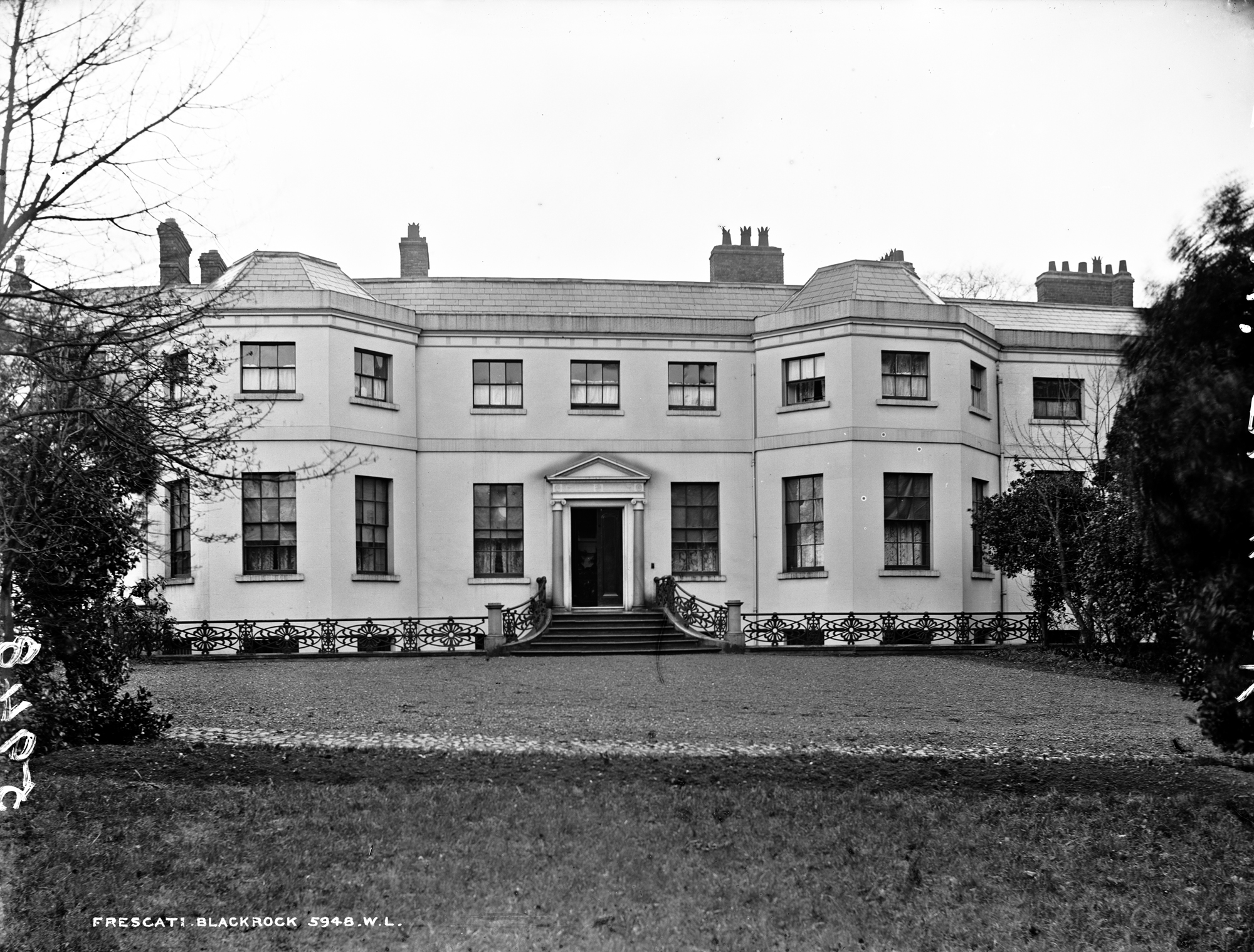
- Front of Frescati House in the late 1800s

- Location within Ireland

General information
- Status: Demolished
- Type: House
- Architectural style: Georgian
- Location: Blackrock, Dublin, Ireland
- Coordinates: 53.3011°N 6.1819°W
- Estimated completion: 1739
- Demolished: 1983

Technical details
- Floor count: 3

Design and construction
- Architects: Various including James Wyatt, Thomas Owen
- Developer: John Hely-Hutchinson

Frescati House (sometimes misspelled 'Frascati') was a Georgian house and estate situated in Blackrock, Dublin. It was built in 1739 for the family of John Hely Hutchinson, the Provost of Trinity College.

The house was acquired in 1970 by the owners of Roches Stores and, after a long campaign to save it, was demolished in 1983 to build the Frascati Shopping Centre.

During the eighteenth century, Blackrock was favoured with the well-to-do of Ireland and grew into a fashionable seaside resort. The gentry of smog-ridden Dublin advanced into the area to embrace the sea air. It was around this period that a number of marine villas were built around Blackrock – including Maretimo, Carysfort, Lios an Uisce, Sans Souci and others.

== The Duchess ==
In the 1750s, Hely-Hutchinson sold the house to the FitzGeralds, Ireland's largest landowners, who owned land throughout Leinster. Frescati became one of their three principal residences alongside Leinster House in Dublin and Carton House in County Kildare. They spent much time in Frescati, especially in the summer. When the Duchess of Leinster, Emily FitzGerald saw Frescati, she is said to have "fallen in love with it".

== Enlargement and improvement ==
Unlike Kildare House and Carton House, the Fitzgeralds did not commission Frescati House, but bought it and improved it; in the 1760s, they extended and enhanced it. They are said to have spent £85,000 on the house (equivalent to approximately £14.2 million in 2023). It tripled in size and received flanking wings and bay windows to take advantage of its sea views. It was at this time that the house was given its name, Frescati, a deliberate corruption of the Italian resort of Frascati.

== Architecture and landscape ==
Unlike some other great houses, its exterior was austere and not adorned with pediments or pilasters. For some, this gave it a noble simplicity. For others, it seemed unremarkable and undermined the case for preservation. Its exterior contrasted with a richly ornate and well-proportioned interior. The interior had carved marble chimneypieces, many elaborate ceilings and plasterwork of a high quality. There was a book room, a classical stone staircase with medallioned walls and a circular room with a groined ceiling. In the long parlour there was a painted ceiling by Riley, a student of Joshua Reynolds. Frescati even had its own theatre with Corinthian columns. Jacob Smith, who also worked at Carton and Russborough, landscaped and devised the large formal gardens filled with rare plants and shrubs. The house stood well back from the road on several acres of woods and parkland, and the Priory Stream passed through its grounds. There was also a small seawater pool in the garden. The gateway stood close to where the entrance to the Blackrock Shopping Centre stands today and its lands stretched back to where Sydney Avenue is now located.

== Lord Edward FitzGerald ==
It was the favourite place of residence of Lord Edward FitzGerald, a prominent commander of the United Irishmen. He was Emily's son and had spent much of his childhood here. Emily was careful of her children's health, so they spent most of their time in Blackrock and were educated there. Emily was a strong devotee of Jean-Jacques Rousseau's Emile, which preached the importance of practical lessons from the real world rather than rigid book learning. Emily decided that Blackrock would be the best place to practice the Rousseau ideals of education on her children. The Duchess, who was no stranger to extravagance, invited Rousseau himself to Frescati to be her children's tutor. He declined, so Emily hired a Scottish tutor instead. The tutor, named William Ogilvie, was told to bring Emile to life in Blackrock. She later shocked and scandalised her family by marrying Ogilvie six weeks after her husband's death. Lord Edward married his wife Pamela in Tournai in December 1792. After spending some time in Hamburg, the couple came to Frescati in 1793. The couple rarely had a permanent home during their time together, due to Lord Edward FitzGerald's involvement with the United Irishmen. Pamela, believed by some to be the illegitimate daughter of Duke of Orleans, was described as "elegant and engaging in the highest degree" and of "judicious taste in her remarks and curiosities". Frescati House served as the venue for some United Irishmen meetings. Thomas Paine, the author of The Rights of Man visited Lord Edward in Frescati House. Lord Cloncurry, who lived nearby in Maretimo, was also a frequent visitor to the house. A passage from a letter FitzGerald wrote to his mother in 1793 reads:

Wife and I are come to settle here. We came last night, got up to a delightful spring day, and we are now enjoying the little book room, with the windows open, hearing the birds sing, and the place looking beautiful. The plants in the passage are just watered: and with the passage door open the room smells like a greenhouse. Pamela has dressed four beautiful flower-pots, and is now working at her frame, while I write to my dearest mother; and upon the two little stands are six pots of fine auriculas, and I am sitting in a bay window with all those pleasant feelings which the fine weather, the pretty place, the singing birds, the pretty wife and Frescati give me.

When he returned to the house in 1797, he wrote:

I can’t tell you how pleased I was to see this place again. In a moment one goes over the years; every shrub, every turn, every peep of the house has a little history in it. The weather is delightful and the place looks beautiful. The trees are all so grown and there a thousand pretty sheltered spots, which near the sea in this season is very pleasant. The birds sing, the flowers blow, and make me for moments forget the world and all the villainy and tyranny going on in it.

It was as a result of a meeting at Frescati on 24 February 1798, that Fitzgerald’s revolutionary plans were betrayed by Thomas Reynolds. By March 1798, the United Irishmen had been infiltrated by spies. At this time, members of the Leinster committee were arrested. Lord Edward Fitzgerald escaped and went on the run. However an informer, attracted by the £1000 reward, was responsible for Fitzgerald’s arrest in Dublin's Thomas Street on 19 May. He shot one of his attackers, in his attempt to escape, but he received a gunshot wound in the process. He died later from his untreated injuries in Newgate Prison on 4 June.

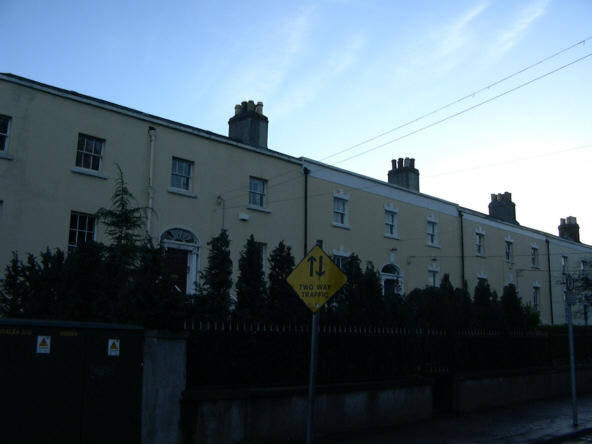
Pembroke Place, a terrace built by Reverend Craig

== Victorian era ==
Later, the house was owned briefly by Sir Henry Cavendish, Receiver-General for Ireland. For a time, it housed Reverend Craig's boys' school which began in 1804. This school prepared students for Trinity College, Dublin, and emphasised anti-Papist (anti-Catholic) values, much the opposite of what Lord Edward believed. Several notable fireplace pieces were removed at this time. According to Gerald Campbell's book Edward and Pamela Fitzgerald Lady Campbell (their daughter) traced two of them to houses in Merrion Square. The five stables (which were situated before the bend of what is now Frescati Park) were converted into houses. The Craig family sold the house in the 1850s.

== Early 20th century and development ==
In the 20th century, residential developments were built on the estate of Frescati, such as Frescati Park. Frescati Park partly incorporated Stable Lane, and the stable-houses were demolished to make way for it. It was built on woodland around Frescati, and comprised houses with bow windows, mirroring those of Frescati. When Lisalea House was demolished, its lands were incorporated into the Frescati Estate.

== Beginning of the end ==
Frescati's demise began in the late sixties, when it was acquired from the McKinleys. The grounds of the Frescati remained substantial. In the late 1960s, Dún Laoghaire Corporation acquired lands at Frescati to build a bypass. Even after land had been acquired for the Blackrock dual carriageway, the house retained at least 7 acres (2.8 ha). At the same time, Frescati and its lands were rezoned for commercial development. This meant a high financial potential for the lands. By 1970, Frescati was owned by "Frescati Estates Limited", a company controlled by the directors and owners of Roches Stores. They sought planning permission to have it demolished. Permission was granted, subject to permission being granted for whatever was to be built on the site. A department store, an office block, a hotel and a car park were planned for the site.

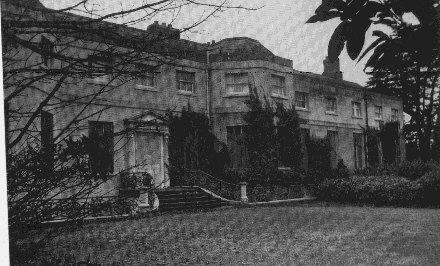
Frescati boarded up after purchase by the board of Roches Stores

== Struggle to preserve Frescati ==
When the proposals became public in 1971, there were objections by conservationists. A meeting called to discuss the future Frescati in Blackrock Town Hall was well attended. Several groups emerged in opposition to its demolition. Some locals formed an organisation called the Frescati Preservation Society. Desmond FitzGerald acted as the chairman, and Marie Avis Walker was secretary. Roches Stores were prepared only to retain a single stuccoed ceiling, which was to be kept in a memorial hall attached to the store. Local politicians joined the "Save Frescati" campaign as the house's welfare became a major issue with conservationists. Since permission to demolish the house had already been granted on the condition that permission was granted for whatever was planned for the site, the campaign focused its efforts on preventing this planning permission from being granted.

Roches threatened to sue Dún Laoghaire Corporation for £1.3 million, a large amount at the time, despite legal opinion that such a claim could never be substantiated. However, they said that they would withdraw this claim if they were allowed to knock down the wings. Dún Laoghaire Corporation submitted a proposal for opinion that they could demolish the wings and integrate the Pillar room into the part that was to be retained. This was rejected by the conservationists. Several groups in favour of conservation including An Taisce, Bord Fáilte, the National Monuments Advisory Council, the Old Dublin Society, the Arts Council, and the Irish Georgian Society, signed a formal objection rejecting any proposition on the part of Dún Laoghaire Corporation to permit the demolition of any part of Frescati. Several companies offered to buy the house and promised to develop the lands while preserving Frescati. One of these companies wanted to erect a residential development in the remaining land which integrated a restored Frescati. All of these offers were refused.

Conservationists feared that Roches Stores would attempt to demolish the house illegally. When locals noticed a truck load of masonry from the house, they alerted Dublin Corporation who sent a housing inspector. Having gained access to the house, they found the architect of the shopping centre with some workmen and that some floors had been removed. The architect claimed that they were "just lifting floorboards and joists". There was no apparent reason why they would need to carry out such a job on the house. In any case, they were not permitted to carry out any works of this kind on the house. The housing inspector pointed this out.

Marie Avis Walker exploited a legal loophole, which had first been exposed by somebody who had applied for permission to build "a small cabin of clay and wattles made, nine bean rows, and a hive for honey bee" on the Isle of Innisfree earlier in the 1970s. This application was rejected in a decision by Sligo County Council, which claimed that it would hinder public amenities. When Marie Avis Walker made use of the loophole, she was more successful. She was granted planning permission for a shopping centre in which Frescati was retained in its entirety. The developers were concerned that she was able to do this, even though she was not the owner of the land. The law was changed as a direct result of this, and it is not possible now to seek planning permission for land which you do not own. This event was important for another reason: though Marie Avis Walker proved that the shopping centre and Frescati House could co-exist, Roches rejected the possibility, and in doing so demonstrated their opposition to preserving Frescati.

As the dispute continued, the house was deteriorating rapidly. Valuable interior fittings such as chimney-pieces were removed. Lead was stolen from the roof, which led to damage of the plasterwork. Roches Stores were reluctant to spend money protecting a building they wanted demolished. The Corporation was partly to blame, as they did not properly replace the wall that they had demolished to facilitate the new road. This left the grounds of Frescati open and no action was taken against the people who were damaging the building. No repairs were carried out on the house and it became derelict. The worsening condition of the house was one of the factors which made its ultimate destruction unavoidable.

In the early eighties, An Bord Pleanála finally granted permission for its wings to be demolished. In 1981, it was stripped of its wings. These constituted seventy percent of the house. The essential conditions that called for the restoration of the rest of the house were subsequently ignored. When the wings were demolished, nothing was done to prop up the remainder of the house. Despite this, the building was still structurally safe. The Corporation had argued that the proposed development was unsuitable for the area. Once Roches had completed their Department Store, the conservationists had no legal leg to stand on, since permission to demolish the house was effective once permission to develop the site had been granted. Roches declared that Frescati was beyond restoration.

== The end ==
At this stage, it was clear that the attempt to preserve Frescati was being lost. In 1982, the Corporation tried to get an injunction in the High Court to compel Roches Stores to restore the remainder of the house as per the planning conditions. The judge, Mr. Justice O'Hanlon criticised both sides for the situation that had been allowed to develop. The Corporation had failed both to ensure that the vacant building was kept in proper repair and to enforce the law on Roches Stores. They hadn't taken effective action over the developers' refusal to abide by undertakings they had given to retain the one house and to spend £20,000 on essential repairs. Mr. Justice O'Hanlon concluded that the situation had gone beyond the point of no return, and that it was not feasible at this stage to restore Frescati. A quote from the final judgement reads:

It appears to me that the developers have been completely indifferent to, or perhaps have even welcomed, this deterioration in the condition of the building, and have done virtually nothing to halt it. I feel the developers have shown a complete disregard for the moral obligations which arose from their course of dealing with the corporation or the planning applications; but I feel the corporation have also been extremely remiss to exercising whatever statutory powers were open to them to cope with the situation.

On 4 November 1983, in the early hours of the morning the shell of Frescati was razed to the ground, ending a campaign which had lasted almost thirteen years. Two JCBs completed the job quietly, and not a single protester turned up to hamper the demolition, though some came to observe the demolition. Some of the bamboo, which was planted in 1784 by Lord Edward from shoots he brought back from St. Lucia in the Caribbean, was still there. Souvenir hunters came to scour the rubble, which was left in situ until ten o'clock in the morning. Then the remains were collected into lorries and dumped in Ringsend. Frescati's end was summarised in a letter by Aidan Kelly, which appeared in the Irish Independent:

Softly, well before the winter dawn, the yellow monster lurched towards the grey façade. A lone rook stirred in the tall beeches nearby, troubled by the relentless purring of powerful motors. Down beyond the stream, what remains of his ornamental garden, a few regal bamboo blades, trembled in the night breeze. A mighty arm nudged the building. There was no crash, not even a rumble. Masonry fell with a rustle and hiss of dust down ivy-clad walls, to thud in moss. Within the hour, Frescati was no more.

A long time later, in the dull light of the November morning, early shoppers passed along, wrapped in the world of their own concerns. They noticed nothing. Maybe our small and selfish minds, our furtive Irish ways, our ready response to the turning of a coin, could never grasp the natural nobility and great sincerity of the man [Lord Edward Fitzgerald]! His progressive recognition of the total injustice of the behaviour of the aristocracy towards Ireland, is something the Irish have never had the greatness of mind to value. In the Irish mind this gallant man has always been a lesser patriot. Now they would roll a boulder in, and slap a plaque upon it! How quickly we can add an insult to an injury, and know not that we do it.

== Aftermath ==
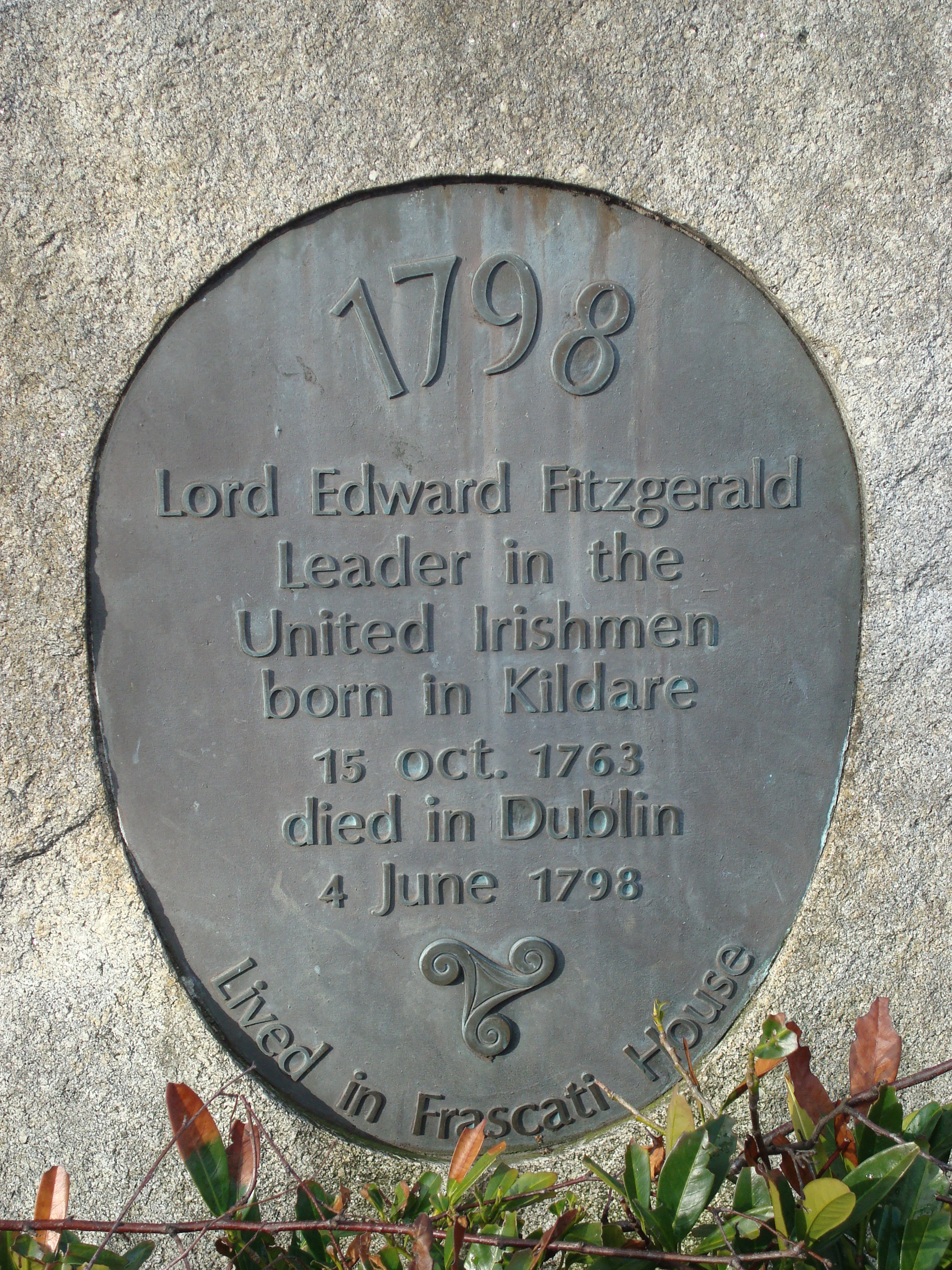
The boulder which Roches Stores erected after they demolished Frescati

Since Frescati's demolition, Roches Stores has ceased to exist. The store tripled in size and became known as the Frascati Shopping Centre. A new shopping centre was built opposite the site of Frescati, and it opened just two years later. By way of compensation for the loss of Frescati, Frescati Estates Limited agreed to endow a scholarship at University College Dublin in perpetuity to the sum of £50,000, to be known as the Lord Edward Fitzgerald Memorial Fund. Roches Stores placed a granite boulder bearing a bronze plaque beside the entrance. The plaque commemorates Lord Edward FitzGerald, though the inscription contains factual inaccuracies, and it mentions that he "lived in Frascati [sic] House". The boulder stands to the right of the pedestrian entrance to the Shopping Centre today, but hedges are often grown in front of it, making it barely visible to passers by.

The Priory (or Frescati in this vicinity) Stream is now culverted under the car park but visible again as it passes a neighbouring apartment development and then passes under the main road to emerge again in Blackrock Park. In time of threat from unexpected raids by the Crown Militia from Dublin Castle, the course of the stream could well have formed an escape route. The original tunnel which Emily had built to carry seawater to Frescati remains to this day; its whereabouts secret, and it has been blocked off.

Due to conservationist pressure, a nearby house, St Helen's, was declared a national monument. The house has since been refurbished as the five-star Radisson Blu Hotel. The lessons learned from Frescati have been used elsewhere. Hundreds of houses in the area were listed for preservation immediately after Frescati was demolished as a direct reaction. The Frescati case was considered in the final stages of the Architectural Heritage (National Inventory) and Historic Monuments (Miscellaneous Provisions) Bill, 1998 and buildings with cultural importance are now afforded greater protection through the act as a result. The large degree of neglect that Frescati suffered was a key tactic of the developers. Legislation was later introduced in which owners of historic buildings can be punished by a prison term or a fine of up to £1 million for negligence. This legislation was exercised when Archer's Garage in the southern city centre, a listed building, was demolished illegally – the developers agreed to rebuild, and did so.

Frescati was the last building of significance connected with the 1798 Rising.

== See also ==
- St. Helen's, Booterstown
