= Ardglass Castle =

Building in County Down, Northern Ireland

Coordinates: 54°15′30″N 5°36′20″W

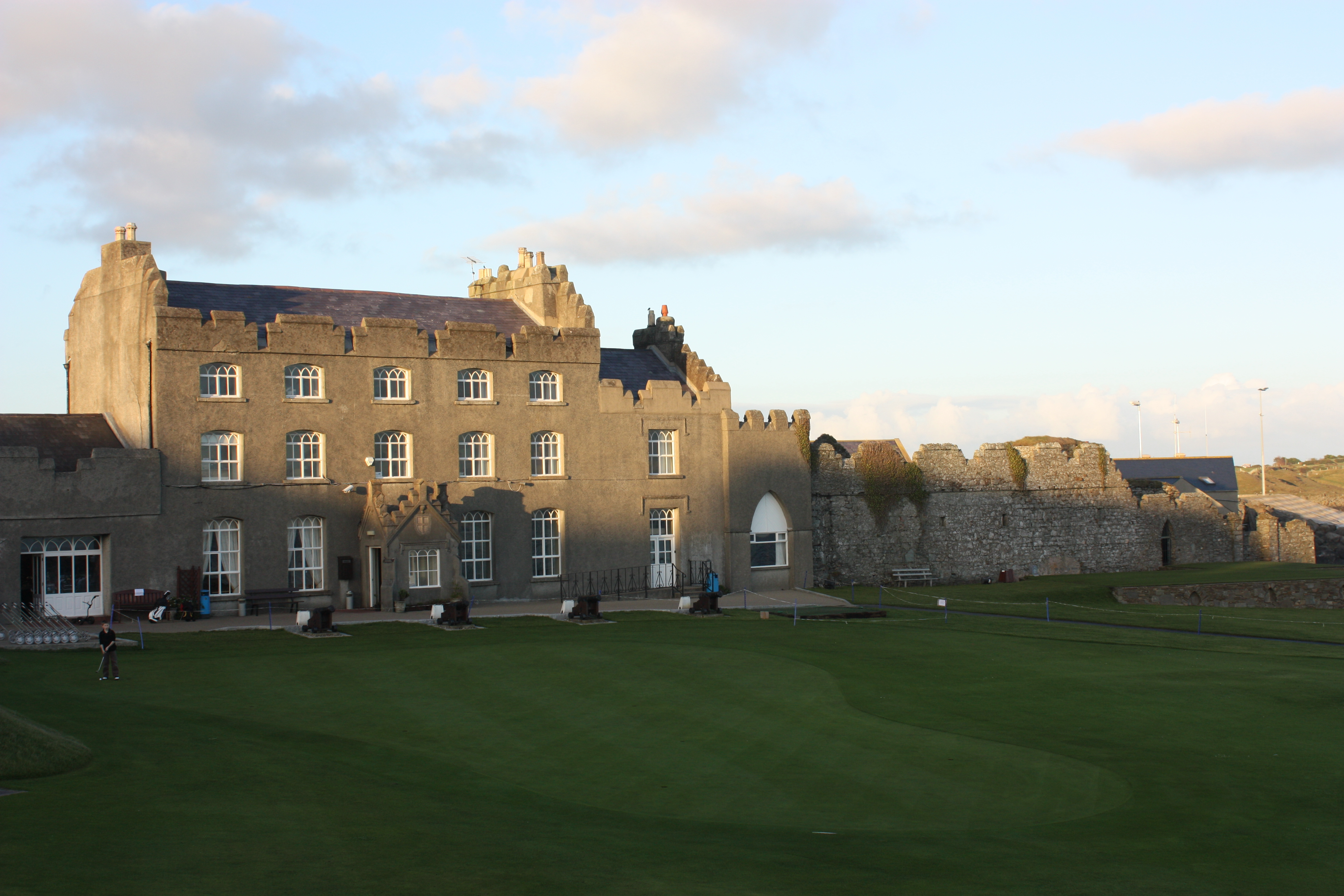
Ardglass Castle (on the right), November 2010

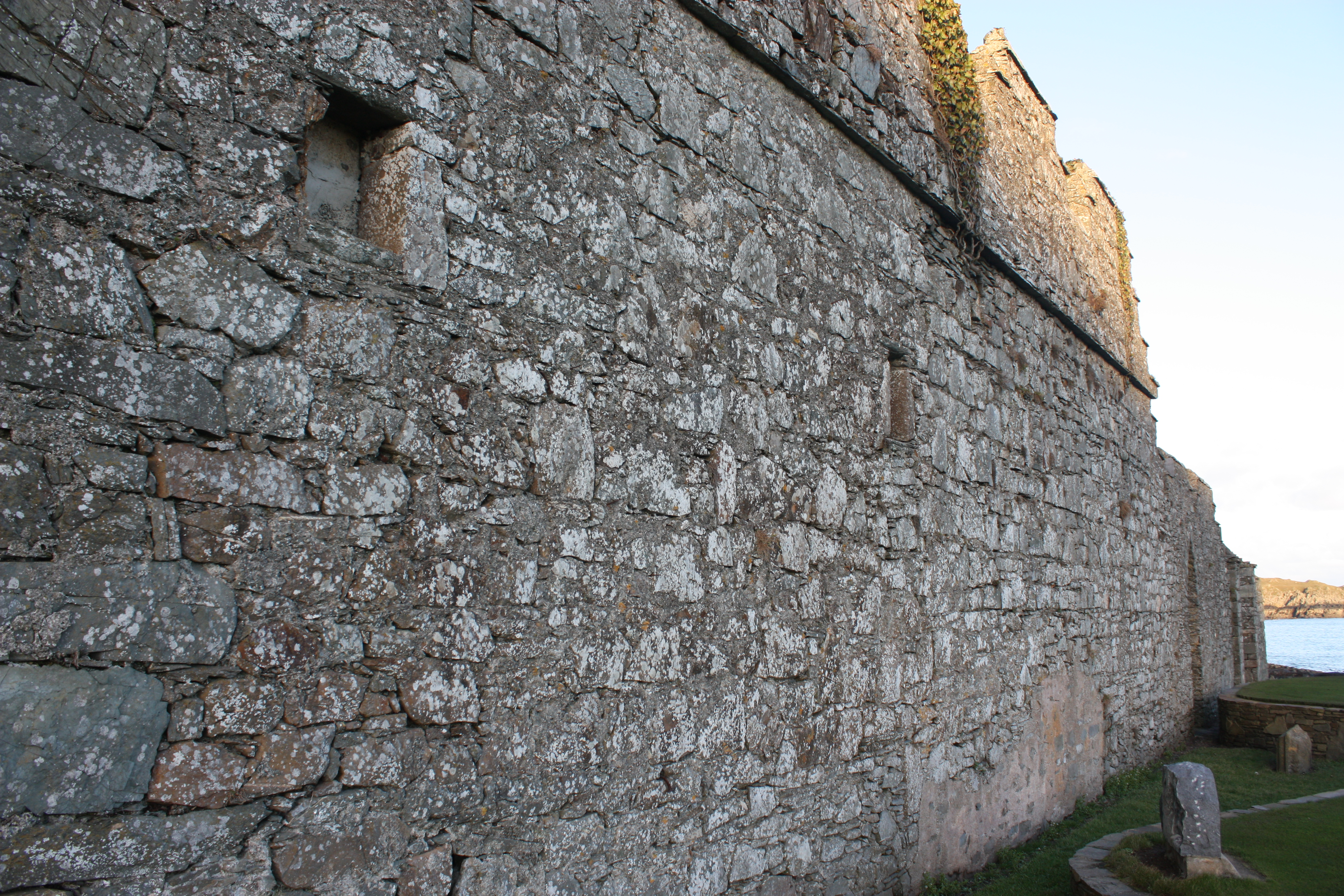
Remains of Ardglass castle, November 2010

Ardglass Castle (also known as The Newark) is situated in Ardglass, County Down, Northern Ireland. It was originally a row of 15th-century warehouses by the harbour. Large sections of the original building can still be seen within the modern club house of Ardglass Golf Club. (Grid ref: 561 371)

== History ==
The 15th century structures were converted into a castellated house at the end of the 18th century by Charles FitzGerald, the first and last Baron Lecale. The castle was also lived in by his mother, Emily FitzGerald, Duchess of Leinster, and her second husband, William Ogilvie, who had been tutor to her son, Lord Edward FitzGerald. Ogilvie subsequently worked to develop Ardglass as a fashionable seaside resort and port. The old warehouses were given battlements, regular windows and the interior was decorated with plasterwork of the period. It was eventually inherited by William Ogilvie's daughter by a former marriage, who was the wife of Charles Beauclerk, a great grandson of Charles Beauclerk, 1st Duke of St Albans. In the later 19th century there was further work on the windows and a porch added to one front. The castle became the premises of Ardglass Golf Club in 1911.

== Features ==
The block of warehouses was built to provide 13 spaces behind the quay, guarded by towers at each end, and which it is assumed could be let out to resident or visiting merchants.

The Dublin Penny Journal of 30 March 1833 describes Ardglass Castle as follows:

Here is also a long range of castellated houses, called by the inhabitants the New-works, and said to have been erected by Shane O'Neil about the year 1570. It stands boldly on a rocky shore of the bay, which washes it on the east and north sides, and extends 250 feet (76 m) in length, and in breadth only 24; the thickness of the walls being three feet. Its design is uniform and elegant, consisting of three square towers, one in the centre and one at each end, each tower containing three apartments 10 feet (3.0 m) square; the intermediate space is occupied by a range of 15 arched door-ways of cut stone, and 16 square windows--a doorway and a window being placed alternately next to each other all along the range, an arrangement which leaves no doubt that they were designed for shops or merchant's ware-rooms. There is a story over the shops, containing the same number of apartments, and each has its own separate stone staircase. The rooms on the ground floor were seven feet high; the upper rooms six feet and a half; and in each of these was a small water-closet, the flue of which runs down through the walls, and is washed at the bottom by the sea. They have no fire-place; and the merchants, as it would appear, were in the habit of using Horn Castle as their kitchen and dining hall. On the seaside there are no windows or apertures, except narrow loop-holes, a circumstance which, together with the centre and flanking towers, shows the secondary purpose of the building to have been a fortress, to protect the merchants from piratical assailants.

== See also ==
- Castles in Northern Ireland
