= Emily FitzGerald, Duchess of Leinster =

British duchess (1731–1814); second of the famous Lennox sisters

Her Grace The Duchess of Leinster
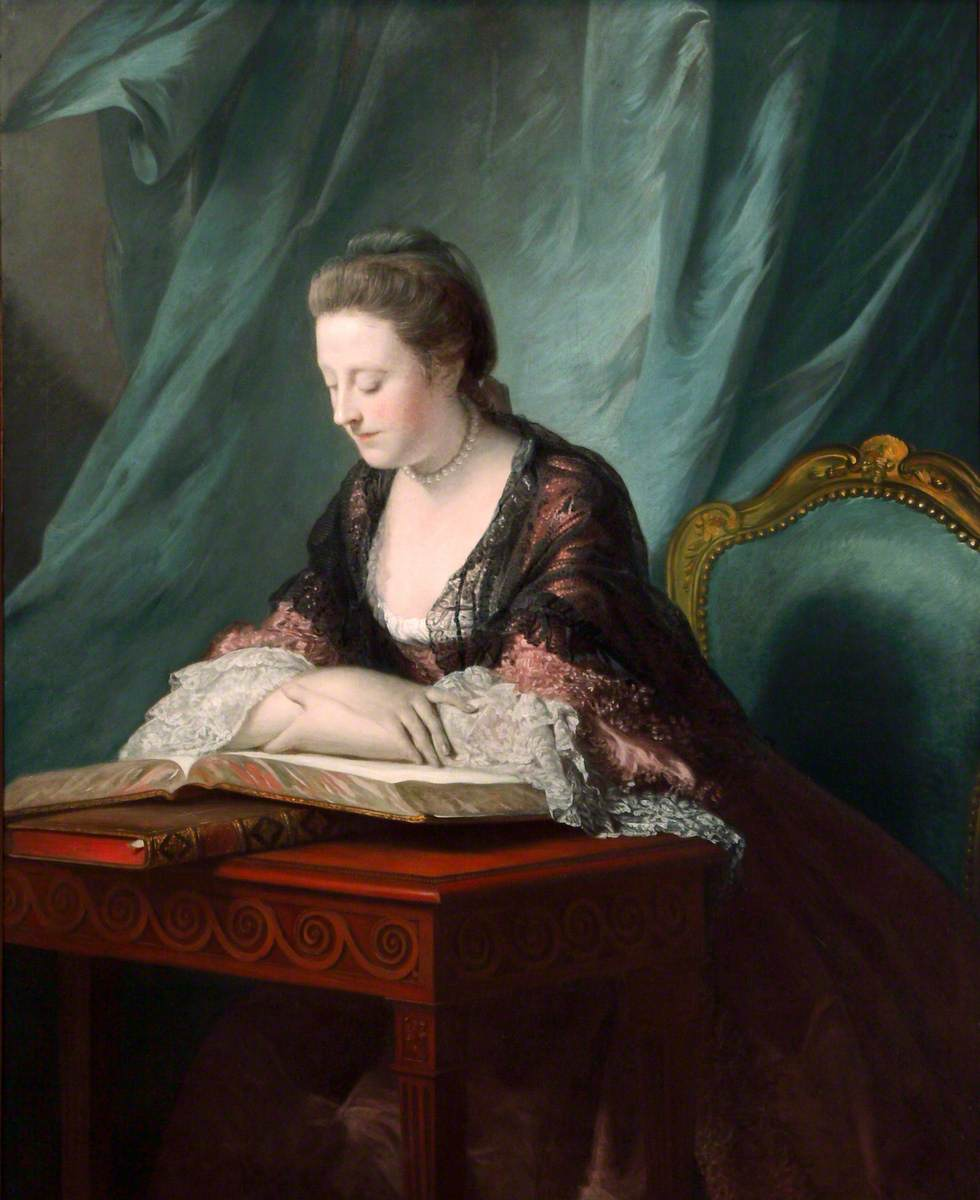
- Emily, Countess of Kildare by Allan Ramsay (1713-1784). Oil on canvas, painted 1765.
- Born: Lady Emilia Mary Lennox; 6 October 1731
- Died: 27 March 1814 (aged 82); Grosvenor Square, London, England
- Spouses: James FitzGerald, 1st Duke of Leinster (m. 1747; died 1773) William Ogilvie (m. 1774)
- Issue: 22, including: William Fitzgerald, 2nd Duke of Leinster; Charles Fitzgerald, 1st Baron Lecale; Charlotte Strutt, 1st Baroness Rayleigh; Lord Henry Fitzgerald; Lord Edward Fitzgerald; Lady Lucy Anne Fitzgerald
- Parents: Charles Lennox, 2nd Duke of Richmond; Sarah Cadogan

Emily Fitzgerald, Duchess of Leinster (6 October 1731 – 27 March 1814), known before 1747 as Lady Emily Lennox, from 1747 to 1761 as The Countess of Kildare and from 1761 to 1766 as The Marchioness of Kildare, was the second of the famous Lennox sisters, daughters of Charles Lennox, 2nd Duke of Richmond (who was illegitimately descended from King Charles II of England and one of his mistresses).

== Early life ==
Lady Emily married James FitzGerald, 20th Earl of Kildare, on 7 February 1747. After their wedding in London, the couple returned to Fitzgerald's native Ireland, first residing at Leinster House then Carton House.

Their marriage was reportedly a happy one, despite Lord Kildare's infidelities. Emily was almost always pregnant, giving birth to nineteen children in just twenty-five years, but only ten lived to mature adulthood:

- George FitzGerald, Earl of Offaly (15 January 1748 – Richmond House, 26 September 1765) died at the age of seventeen.
- William FitzGerald, 2nd Duke of Leinster (12 March 1749 – 20 October 1804) married Hon. Emilia St. George (daughter of St George Saint-George, 1st Baron St George) on 4 November 1775. They had nine children.
- Lady Caroline FitzGerald (21 June 1750 – 13 April 1754) died at the age of three.
- Lady Emily Mary FitzGerald (15 March 1751 – 8 April 1818) married Charles Coote, 1st Earl of Bellomont on 20 August 1774. They had five children.
- Lady Henrietta FitzGerald (9 December 1753 – 10 September 1763) died the age of nine.
- Lady Caroline FitzGerald (born and died April 1755)
- Charles FitzGerald, 1st Baron Lecale (30 June 1756 – 30 June 1810) married twice and had two illegitimate children.
- Lady Charlotte Mary Gertrude FitzGerald (29 May 1758 – 13 September 1836) married Joseph Strutt on 23 February 1789. They had four children.
- Lady Louisa Bridget FitzGerald (19 June 1760 – January 1765) died at the age of four.
- Lord Henry FitzGerald (30 July 1761 – 8 July 1829) married Charlotte Boyle-Walsingham on 3 August 1791. They had thirteen children.
- Lady Sophia Sarah Mary FitzGerald (26 September 1762 – 21 March 1845).
- Lord Edward FitzGerald (15 October 1763 – 4 June 1798) married Stéphanie Caroline Anne Syms on 27 December 1792. They had three children.
- Lord Robert Stephen FitzGerald (1765 – 2 January 1833), a diplomat; married Sophia Charlotte Fielding and had issue.
- Lord Gerald FitzGerald (January 1766 – 1788). Drowned, went down with the ship in which he was serving.
- Lord Augustus FitzGerald (15 January 1767 – 2 January 1771) died at the age of three.
- Lady Fanny FitzGerald (28 January 1770 – 1775) died at the age of five.
- Lady Lucy Anne FitzGerald (5 February 1771 – 1851) married Admiral Sir Thomas Foley on 31 July 1802.
- Lady Louisa FitzGerald (1772 – 1776) died at the age of four.
- Lord George Simon FitzGerald (16 April 1773 – May 1783) died at the age of ten. Recognized as a son of Lord Kildare, but in fact was the biological child of the Fitzgerald children's tutor, William Ogilvie.

Lord Kildare was created successively Marquess of Kildare and Duke of Leinster in recognition of his contribution to the political life of his country. It was partly the Duke's influence that led to a rift between the Duchess and her eldest sister, Caroline Fox, 1st Baroness Holland.

== Later life ==
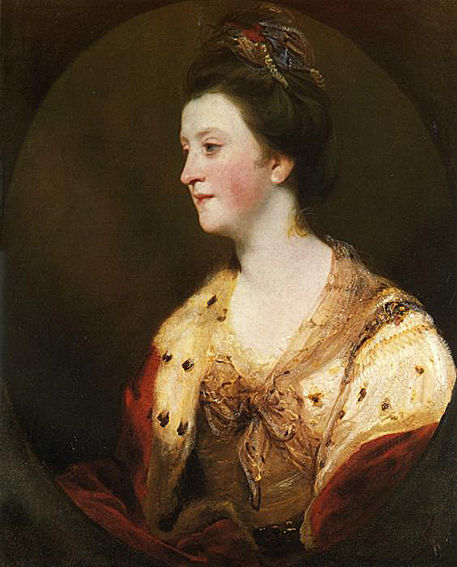
The Duchess of Leinster painted by Sir Joshua Reynolds in the 1770s.

After the death of Lord Kildare on 19 November 1773, Emily married her children's tutor, William Ogilvie, on 26 August 1774. Emily and Ogilvie had begun an affair some years earlier in Frescati House. Despite her remarriage, she continued to be known as The Dowager Duchess of Leinster.

Ogilvie was nine years her junior, and was the natural father of her youngest son from her first marriage. They lived for part of their marriage at Ardglass Castle in Ardglass, County Down, where Ogilvie worked to develop the village. A further three children were born to them after their marriage, two of whom lived to adulthood:

- Cecilia Margaret Ogilvie (9 July 1775 – 1824) married Charles Lock on 12 July 1795; they had three daughters.
- Charlotte Ogilvie (born and died 1777)
- Emily Charlotte "Mimie" Ogilvie (May 1778 – 22 January 1832) married Charles George Beauclerk (son of Topham Beauclerk and Lady Diana Spencer; briefly an MP) on 29 April 1799; they had thirteen children.

Emily was treated generously in her first husband's will. He left her a jointure of £4,000 annually (increased from the £3,000 promised in the settlement), and a life interest in Leinster House (Dublin) and Carton (which she exchanged for Frescati House and £40,000) together with all their contents. She had brought the usual ducal daughter's dowry of £10,000, so the jointure and other payments would financially cripple her son, the second Duke of Leinster.

The first Duke also made over-generous provisions for his younger sons and all his daughters. Emily also received the usual annuity of £400 annually for each of the minor children who lived with her, even after her remarriage to Ogilvie.

Thus, Emily and William Ogilvie were probably financially better off than her son, the second Duke, who existed on less than £7,000 annually, out of which he had to run two large houses, play a role in Irish politics, and also provide lavish dowries of £10,000 each for three sisters who married. He also had to pay huge annuities (£2,000 each) to his two younger brothers Lord Lecale and Lord Henry Fitzgerald, and to pay his youngest brothers £10,000 each at their majority. Since Emily lived to 1814 (outliving the second Duke by ten years), all these generous testamentary provisions, along with the huge building costs incurred by the first Duke, crippled the Leinsters for generations.

Fourteen of her children predeceased her, ten of whom died in childhood or adolescence. All these bereavements caused much pain to Emily, who always remained until the end at the bedside of her children, except to faint from the suffering of seeing them die in her arms. One of her sons, Lord Edward FitzGerald, was a major figure in the republican movement, and was killed during the Irish Rebellion of 1798.

She died on 27 March 1814 in Grosvenor Square, London.

== Popular culture ==
In 1999, Irish Screen, BBC America and WGBH produced Aristocrats, a six-part limited television series based on the lives of Emily Lennox and her sisters. Geraldine Somerville and Siân Phillips portray Emily as a young woman and as an older woman, respectively.

The series aired in the US on PBS stations under the aegis of the anthology series Masterpiece Theater; in the UK it aired on the BBC. The series was based on Stella Tillyard's 1994 biography, Aristocrats: Caroline, Emily, Louisa and Sarah Lennox 1740-1832.

== See also ==
- List of people with the most children
