= Charles Lock =

British consul-general in Naples

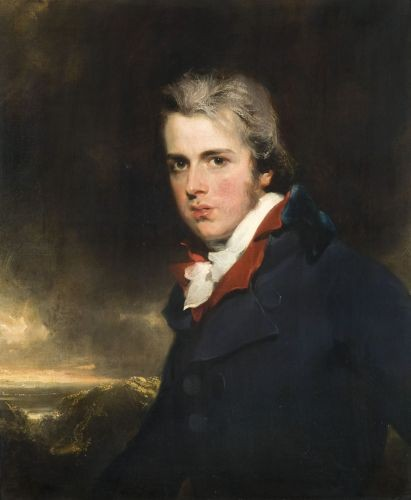
- Born: 1770
- Died: 12 September 1804 (aged 33–34); Lazzaretto, Malta
- Resting place: Malta
- Known for: Consul-general in Naples
- Spouse: Cecilia Margaret Ogilvie
- Children: Three daughters: Emily Frederica (1796–1822); Georgina Cecilia (1798–1867); Lucy Frances (1801–1893)
- Parent(s): William Lock of Norbury and Frederica Augusta Schaub

Charles Lock (1770 – 12 September 1804) was the British consul-general in Naples during the Neapolitan Revolution of 1799.

== Family ==
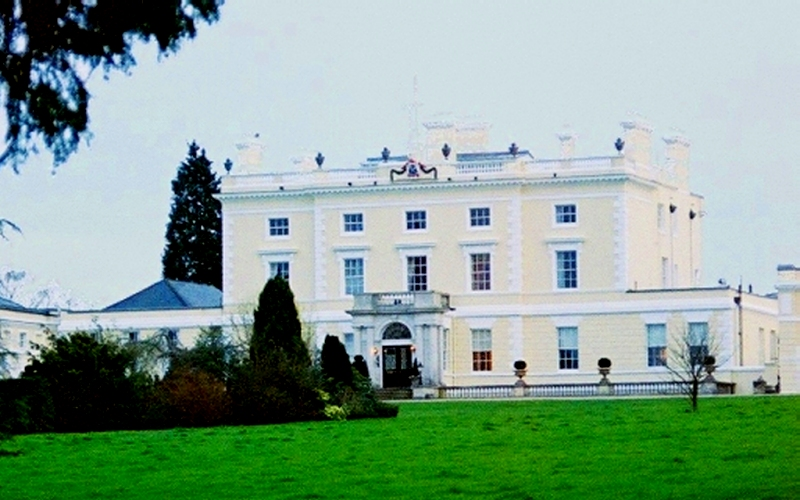
Norbury Park, built by Charles Lock's father in 1774

Charles Lock was born in 1770 into a rich, though illegitimate family. He was the second son of William Lock, who purchased the Norbury Park estate in Mickleham, Surrey in 1774 and commissioned Thomas Sandby to build the present manor house. Charles Lock's parents were close friends to famed diarist and novelist Frances Burney (a.k.a. Mme d'Arblay), who spells their name Locke.

On 12 July 1795, Charles Lock married Cecilia Margaret Ogilvie (9 July 1775 – 1824), daughter of Emily FitzGerald, Duchess of Leinster and her second husband William Ogilvie. Cecilia had almost married the son and heir of the 1st Marquess of Donegall in 1790.

Author Jack Russell, who was critical of Lock, stated in his book Nelson and the Hamiltons that he "married above himself." Lock's wife was the half-sister of the Irish rebel Lord Edward FitzGerald who was arrested for treason and died of wounds sustained while resisting arrest in 1798, and the cousin of prominent Whig statesman Charles James Fox. Jack Russell thus points out that Charles Lock was "allied to a family which had strong Republican sympathies." His liberal intellect and connection to Fox made Charles Lock feel "a better man than a decrepit Ambassador or a half-blind Admiral." Because of their family connections, Charles Lock and his wife were naturally taken for Jacobins at the Bourbon court of Naples.

Charles Lock and his wife Cecilia had three daughters:

- Emily Frederica Lock (1796–1822). She married Count George de Viry around 1815, and left descendants in Italy.
- Georgina Cecilia Lock (1798–1867). She married Robert Fulke Greville in 1822 (2x great nephew of Sir William Hamilton). Their son William Hamilton Greville, born in 1826, died a bachelor.
- Lucy Frances Lock (1801–1893). She was born in Naples on 26 June 1801 during her father's consulship there. She married Captain Alexander Ellice of the Royal Navy in 1826, brother of the well-known politician Edward Ellice.

Like many members of the Lock family, Charles had a portrait of him painted by Sir Thomas Lawrence, probably around 1795, the year of his marriage. The portrait is currently untraceable. A version of it, possibly the original, was at one time in the Kann Collection in Paris.

== Consulship in Naples ==
Charles Lock was appointed British consul-general at Naples on 6 November 1798. The Leinster connections of his mother-in-law had landed him the job, which was considered an unimportant position. However, the political turmoil in Italy resulting from the French Revolutionary Wars made Lock witness several important events during his consulship. With a French invasion of Naples imminent, British vice-admiral Lord Nelson evacuated the Neapolitan King and Queen to Palermo in Sicily on 23 December of the same year.

=== Denunciation of British atrocities ===
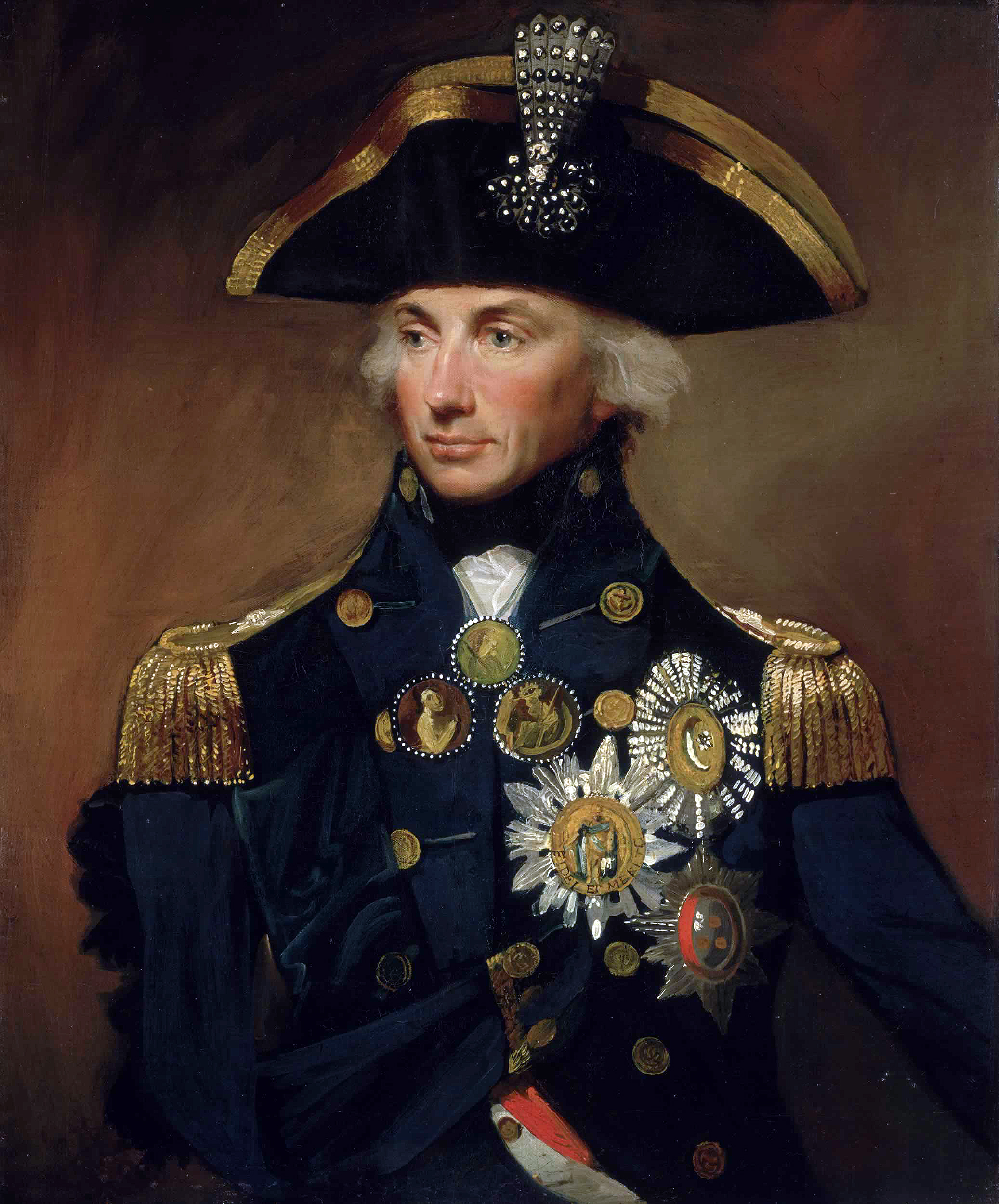
Lord Nelson, commander of the British forces in Naples

On 23 January 1799, the Parthenopaean Republic, a client state of Revolutionary France, was created in the territory of the Kingdom of Naples. Charles Lock, an astute observer, wrote about the frivolous atmosphere of the court in Palermo. He noticed at the end of January that the king was enjoying excellent shooting, the court was attending masked balls, and Nelson feared that if nothing were done Sicily would be lost as well as Naples. Nevertheless, by May 1799, Cardinal Fabrizio Ruffo, in command of the anti-republican peasant Army of Holy Faith (known as the Sanfedismo movement) managed to recapture Naples from the French and the Neapolitan patriots, with the help of some Austrian and Russian troops. Ruffo, who had been appointed by King Ferdinand IV of Naples as his personal representative with "the unrestricted quality of alter-ego," signed an armistice with the patriots in the King's name. The agreement gave the French and the patriots the full honors of war, with their persons and property guaranteed, and included the provision that the garrisons of the forts could embark freely for France. Charles Lock called the agreement "a very wise measure...as it effectively sweeps the Kingdom of the disaffected."

However, as soon as the patriots left the protection of their forts and started boarding the ships that were supposed to take them to France, the Neapolitan King and Queen, who were still safely sheltered in Palermo, informed Lord Nelson that they were disavowing the agreement. The Queen explicitly instructed "Lord Nelson to treat Naples as if it were a rebellious city in Ireland." The ensuing wave of reprisals by the Neapolitan monarchs and their British allies, in which more than 8,000 of the refugees aboard the transports were tried for treason, severely damaged Nelson's reputation back in the United Kingdom and remains to this day a controversial part of his legacy. Charles Lock played an important role in keeping British public opinion informed of the atrocities that were taking place in Naples, by sending letters back home in which he described the events he was witnessing. He wrote to his father in July 1799:

"You will hear with grief of the infraction of the articles convented with the Neapolitan jacobins and of the stab our English honour has received in being employed to decoy these people, who relied upon our faith, into the most deplorable situation... but the sentiment of abhorrence expressed by the whole fleet will I hope exonerate the nation from an imputation so disgraceful. And charge it where it should lie, on the shoulders of one or two."

Lock wrote home about the prisoners in the polaccas, saying:

"Many of these victims to their confidence in us have already been executed. The government is burdened with upwards of 10,000 prisoners... To be sure, they die very fast, in the unwholesome prisons they are confined in, heaped upon one another."

Prominent Whig statesman Charles James Fox, to whom Charles Lock was related through his wife (see Family section), brought the matter to the attention of the Parliament of Great Britain, and denounced the deceitfulness of the British troops in Naples by citing specific incidents. Fox's informant was most likely Charles Lock. In May 1800, Lock reported to Baron Keith that 145 had been executed in Naples; 1,900 transported to France; between 700 and 800 sent to the island of Maritimo; and many had died in unwholesome Neapolitan jails.

=== Fallout with Nelson ===
During the Neapolitan campaign, Charles Lock accused the pursers and captains of the British fleet of cheating and colluding with merchants over prices. This caused an altercation between Lord Nelson and Lock. Lord Nelson challenged Lock's accusations of cheating. Historian Roger Knight states that during the altercation:

"Both men raised their voices; Nelson made Lock grovel by insisting that his accusation was sent to the Victualling Commissioners in London. This was not Nelson's usual style. In response Lock wrote hostile letters home."

== Relationship with Emma Hamilton ==
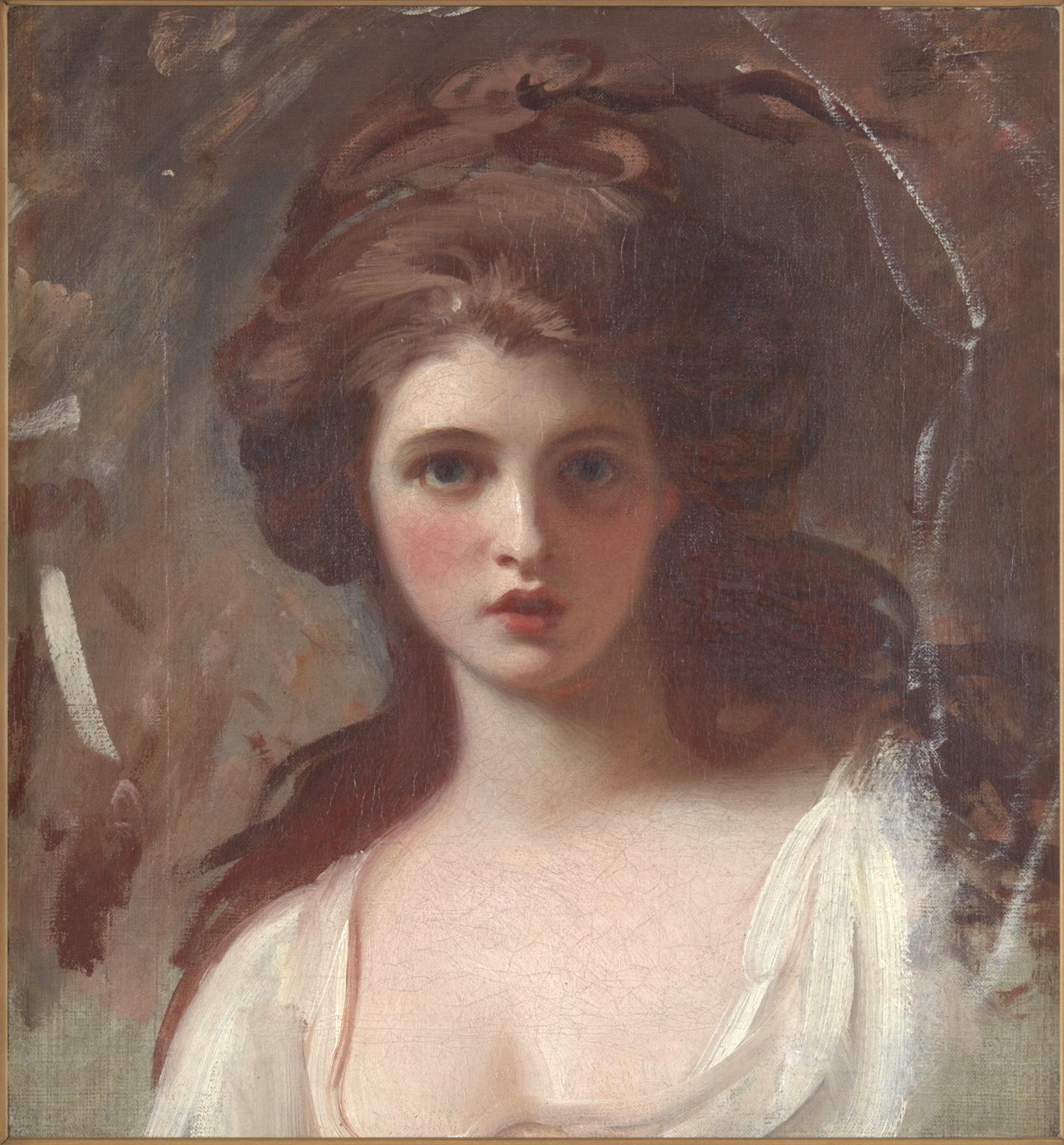
Emma, Lady Hamilton, wife of the British ambassador in Naples and Lord Nelson's mistress

Charles Lock is well known for his hatred of Lord Nelson's mistress, Emma Hamilton, the wife of the British ambassador in Naples Sir William Hamilton. Strains between Lady Hamilton and Lock and his wife led to poisonous relations in the court at Palermo. Biographer Flora Fraser, in her book Emma, Lady Hamilton, describes Charles Lock as "a difficult young man, quick to take offence and all too eager to put himself forward." She points out that his "violent dislike" of Lady Hamilton seems to have reciprocated. Lady Hamilton is known to have spread rumours about Charles Lock's wife Cecilia being a Jacobin, possibly because she was jealous of Cecilia's good looks and youthful figure.

Lady Hamilton's grip over Lord Nelson was especially criticized by Lock. He spoke of her "unbounded power" over Nelson, and complained that the vice-admiral's "extravagant love" had made him "the laughing stock of the whole fleet." Lock became famous for the salacious letters he wrote home in which he denounced Lady Hamilton and Lord Nelson. Flora Fraser describes his letters as "long, vituperative screeds about the horrors of Lady Hamilton." The letters Lock wrote contained "scabrous comments" and gained a wide circulation back in the United Kingdom among those who wished to attack the government by attacking its servants.

Lock began his campaign of denigration on 30 June 1799 in a letter to his father in which he commented on Nelson's return to the recaptured Naples on 24 June with Emma and her husband Sir William. Lock stated that the three embarked aboard HMS Foudroyant "with great secrecy." He expressed his bitterness at not being notified by saying:

"I underwent a severe mortification in not being invited to accompany Sir William or receiving any intimation of their designs, which I relied on as Sir William had repeatedly promised I should attend him when he went."

In the same letter, Lock blamed Lady Hamilton as the one behind the decision to keep him uninformed, and described her as a "superficial, grasping and vulgar minded woman." However, private orders given by the Queen of Naples and Sicily were the actual reason why Nelson and Lady Hamilton left Palermo for Naples with such secrecy, thus forcing Sir William to break his word to Charles Lock.

== Death ==
Charles Lock was appointed Consul-General in Egypt on 26 December 1803. However, he never served there: on his way to Egypt, he died of plague in the Lazzaretto at Malta. He died on 12 September 1804 together with two of his suite. They were assiduously attended by Lock's private secretary, Lambton Este, who placed himself in the lazaretto with them for that purpose.

Charles Lock's death left his family unprovided for. As a result, his daughters continued to receive a pension from the British government well into adulthood, the total of which amounted to £288 in 1838.

== Legacy ==
Despite Lock's role in bringing to light the atrocities that were taking place in Naples, modern historians have mixed opinions about him. Terry Coleman, in his book The Nelson Touch, says that "Lock was not an admirable man." On the other hand, the Duchess of Sermoneta, who wrote a book in 1940 about the Lock family, has a far more sympathetic assessment, saying that Lock "was revolted by what he witnessed in those days" because he was "kind-hearted and honourable."

Scottish historical novelist David Donachie argues that "without much wealth, Charles Lock was a man in a hurry who made no secret that he had designs on Sir William's position as ambassador."

== Bibliography ==
- Coleman, Terry (2002). The Nelson Touch: The life and Legend of Horatio Nelson. New York: Oxford University Press US. ISBN 978-0-19-514741-4. OCLC 49805550.
- Fraser, Flora (1987). Emma, Lady Hamilton. New York: Knopf. ISBN 978-0-394-53053-6. OCLC 14188885.
- Knight, Roger (2007). The Pursuit of Victory: The Life and Achievement of Horatio Nelson. New York: Basic Books. ISBN 978-0-465-03765-0. OCLC 171111027.
- Russell, Jack (1969). Nelson and the Hamiltons. New York: Simon and Schuster. ISBN 978-0-671-20324-5. OCLC 24250.
- Ruvigny et Raineval, Melville Henry Massue (marquis of) (1994). The Plantagenet Roll of the Blood Royal: Being a Complete Table of All the Descendants Now Living of Edward III, King of England. Baltimore, MD: Genealogical Pub. Co. ISBN 978-0-8063-1436-5. OCLC 31263097.
- Sermoneta, Vittoria Colonna Caetani (duchessa di) (1940). The Locks of Norbury: The Story of a Remarkable Family in the XVIIIth and XIXth Centuries (2nd ed.). London: J. Murray. OCLC 418335.

Diplomatic posts
| Unknown Last known title holder: Charles Goddard^{1} | British consul-general in Naples; 6 November 1798 – ? | Unknown Next known title holder: Charles Blair^{2} |
| Vacant Title last held by George Baldwin^{3} | British consul-general in Egypt; 26 December 1803 – 12 September 1804 | Succeeded by Edward Missett^{4} |
Notes and references
1. "No. 13806". The London Gazette. 18 August 1795. p. 862.; 2. "No. 15825". The London Gazette. 16 July 1805. p. 929.; 3. "No. 12714". The London Gazette. 3 January 1786. p. 5.; 4. Bosworth, C.E. (1974). "Henry Salt, Consul in Egypt 1816-1827 and Pioneer Egyptologist" (PDF). University of Manchester. Archived from the original (PDF) on 17 December 2013.
