= James FitzGerald, 1st Duke of Leinster =

British Army officer and politician

Lieutenant-General His Grace The Duke of Leinster PC (Ire)
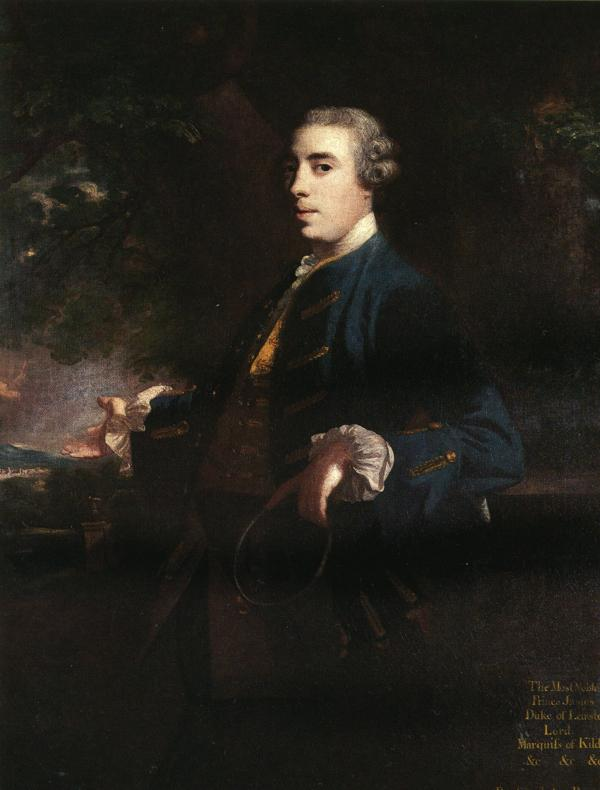
- Portrait by Joshua Reynolds, 1753

Member of the House of Lords Lord Temporal
- In office 1747 – 19 November 1773; Hereditary Peerage
- Succeeded by: William FitzGerald, 2nd Duke of Leinster

Personal details
- Born: 29 May 1722
- Died: 19 November 1773 (aged 51) Leinster House, Dublin
- Spouse: Lady Emily Lennox (m. 1747)
- Children: 18, including: William FitzGerald, 2nd Duke of Leinster; Charles FitzGerald, 1st Baron Lecale; Charlotte Strutt, 1st Baroness Rayleigh; Lord Henry FitzGerald; Lord Edward FitzGerald
- Parents: Robert FitzGerald, 19th Earl of Kildare; Lady Mary O'Brien

Lieutenant-General James FitzGerald, 1st Duke of Leinster, PC (Ire) (29 May 1722 – 19 November 1773), styled Lord Offaly until 1743 and known as The Earl of Kildare between 1743 and 1761 and as The Marquess of Kildare between 1761 and 1766, was a British Army officer and politician.

== Background ==
Leinster was the son of Robert FitzGerald, 19th Earl of Kildare, and Lady Mary, daughter of William O'Brien, 3rd Earl of Inchiquin.

== Career ==
Leinster was a member of the Irish House of Commons for Athy from 1741 before succeeding his father as 20th Earl of Kildare in 1743. He was sworn of the Irish Privy Council in 1746 and in 1747, on the occasion of his marriage (see below), he was created Viscount Leinster, of Taplow in the County of Buckingham, in the Peerage of Great Britain, and took his seat in the British House of Lords that same year. From 1749 to 1755 he was one of the leaders of the Popular Party in Ireland, and served as the country's Master-General of the Ordnance between 1758 and 1766, becoming Colonel of the Royal Irish Artillery in 1760. He was promoted to Major-General in 1761 and to Lieutenant-General in 1770.

In 1761 Lord Kildare was created Earl of Offaly and Marquess of Kildare in the Peerage of Ireland and in 1766 he was further honoured when he was made Duke of Leinster, becoming by this time the Premier Duke, Marquess and Earl in the Peerage of Ireland.

== Family ==
Leinster married the 15-year-old Lady Emily Lennox (6 October 1731 – London, 27 March 1814), daughter of Charles Lennox, 2nd Duke of Richmond and one of the famous Lennox Sisters, in London on 7 February 1747. She was a great-granddaughter of King Charles II and was therefore a distant fifth cousin of King George III (both of them were descended from King James VI and I). The couple had nineteen children:

- George FitzGerald, Earl of Offaly (15 January 1748 – Richmond House, 26 September 1765).
- William FitzGerald, 2nd Duke of Leinster (Arlington Place, Piccadilly, London, 12 March 1749 – Carton House, Kildare, 20 October 1804).
- Lady Caroline FitzGerald (1750 – 1754).
- Lady Emily Mary FitzGerald (15 March 1751 – 8 April 1818), married Charles Coote, 1st Earl of Bellomont and Baron Coote of Coolony. The couple had five children, one son who died young (born 1776) and four daughters. Emily died in Penzance, Cornwall in 1818 after a lingering illness.
- Lady Henrietta FitzGerald (1753 – 1763).
- Lady Caroline FitzGerald (born and died 1755).
- Charles FitzGerald, 1st Baron Lecale (30 June 1756 – 30 June 1810).
- Lady Charlotte Mary Gertrude FitzGerald (29 May 1758 – 13 September 1836), married Joseph Strutt and was made first Baroness Rayleigh. Had issue.
- Lady Louisa Bridget FitzGerald (1760 – 1765).
- Lord Henry FitzGerald (30 July 1761 – 8 July 1829), general; married Charlotte Boyle and had issue, who take by inheritance the surname "de Ros".
- Lady Sophia Sarah Mary FitzGerald (1762 – 21 March 1845).
- Lord Edward FitzGerald (15 October 1763 – 4 June 1798), revolutionary and prominent leader of the United Irishmen during the 1798 rising.
- Lord Robert Stephen FitzGerald (1765 – 2 January 1833), a diplomat; married Sophia Charlotte Fielding and had issue.
- Lord Gerald FitzGerald (January 1766 – 1788). Drowned, went down with the ship in which he was serving.
- Lord Augustus FitzGerald (1767 – 1771).
- Lady Fanny FitzGerald (1770 – 1775).
- Lady Lucy Anne FitzGerald (1771 – 1851), who took part in the Irish Rebellion of 1798. She was married to Admiral Sir Thomas Foley, who served with distinction under Lord Nelson. They had no children.
- Lady Louisa FitzGerald (1772 – 1776).
- Lord George Simon FitzGerald (16 April 1773 – 1783). Recognized as a son of Lord Kildare, but was in fact the biological son of his brother's tutor, William Ogilvie.

Leinster died at Leinster House, Dublin, in November 1773, aged 51, and was buried in the city's Christ Church Cathedral. He was succeeded by his second (but eldest surviving) son, William, Marquess of Kildare. The Duchess of Leinster caused a minor sensation by marrying her lover William Ogilvie in 1774, but continued to be known as The Dowager Duchess of Leinster. She had a further three children by him. She died in London in March 1814, aged 82.

== Popular culture ==
In 1999, Irish Screen, BBC America and WGBH produced Aristocrats, a six-part limited television series based on the lives of Emily Lennox and her sisters. Leinster was portrayed by Ben Daniels.

== Ancestry ==
Ancestors of James FitzGerald, 1st Duke of Leinster

8. George FitzGerald, 16th Earl of Kildare
4. Hon. Robert FitzGerald
9. Lady Joan Boyle
2. Robert FitzGerald, 19th Earl of Kildare
10. James Clotworthy
5. Mary Clotworthy
1. James FitzGerald, 1st Duke of Leinster
12. William O'Brien, 2nd Earl of Inchiquin
6. William O'Brien, 3rd Earl of Inchiquin
13. Lady Margareth Boyle
3. Lady Mary O'Brien
14. Edward Villiers
7. Mary Villiers
15. Lady Frances Howard

Parliament of Ireland
Preceded by Sir Walter Borrowes, 4th Bt; Marcus Morgan	Member of Parliament for Athy; 1741 – 1743; With: Marcus Morgan	Succeeded by Marcus Morgan; Walter Weldon
Peerage of Ireland
New creation	Duke of Leinster; 1766 – 1773	Succeeded by William FitzGerald
New creation	Marquess of Kildare; 1761 – 1773	Succeeded by William FitzGerald
Preceded by Robert FitzGerald	Earl of Kildare; 1743 – 1773	Succeeded by William FitzGerald
Peerage of Great Britain
New creation	Viscount Leinster; 1747–1773	Succeeded by William FitzGerald
