= Charlotte FitzGerald-de Ros, 20th Baroness de Ros =

Irish baroness

The Right Honourable The Baroness de Ros
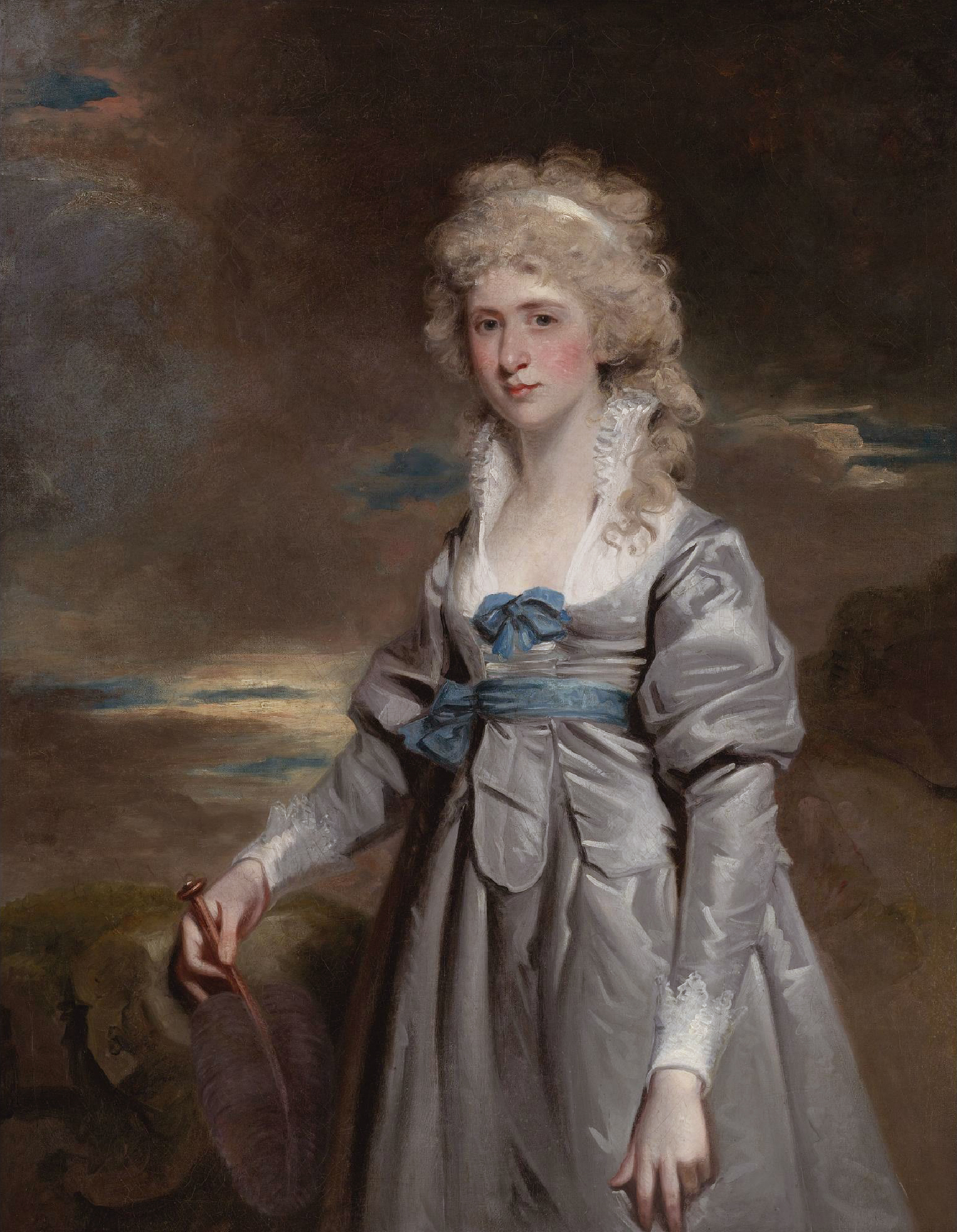
- Charlotte Walsingham, Lady Fitzgerald
- Born: 24 May 1769
- Died: 9 January 1831 (aged 61)
- Occupation: Baroness
- Spouse: Lord Henry FitzGerald
- Parents: the Hon. Robert Boyle, later Boyle-Walsingham (father); Charlotte Hanbury Williams (d. 1790) (mother)

Charlotte FitzGerald-de Ros, 20th Baroness de Ros of Helmsley (24 May 1769 – 9 January 1831), also known as Lady Henry FitzGerald, was an Irish suo jure peeress.

== Biography ==
She was born Charlotte Boyle-Walsingham in Castlemartyr, County Cork, Ireland or in London, where she died. She was the daughter of the Hon. Robert Boyle, later Boyle-Walsingham (1736–1780) and his wife (m. 1759) Charlotte Hanbury Williams (d. 1790), the daughter of Sir Charles Hanbury Williams and Lady Frances Coningsby. Her paternal grandparents were Henry Boyle, 1st Earl of Shannon and his second wife Lady Henrietta Boyle.

She spent most of her childhood with her parents at the Boyle Farm mansion in Thames Ditton. (Her mother, the second daughter of Frances Coningsby, had bought this estate in 1784 from Lord Hertford, who was grieving the death of his wife there two years earlier.) Charlotte did much artistic decoration in Boyle Farm, and much of it has survived to the present day.

In London on 3/4 August 1791, more than a year after her mother's death, Charlotte married Lord Henry FitzGerald, a member of the Duke of Leinster's family.

Charlotte was frequently pregnant during her marriage, giving birth to thirteen children in twenty-one years, of which nine survived to adulthood:

- Henry William FitzGerald-de Ros, 22nd Baron de Ros (1792–1839)
- Lt. Col. Arthur John Hill FitzGerald-de Ros (21 December 1793 – 23 February 1826)
- Emily FitzGerald (1795 – unknown), died in childhood
- General William Lennox Lascelles FitzGerald-de Ros, 23rd Baron de Ros (1797–1874)
- Hon. Edmund Emilius Boyle FitzGerald-de Ros (4 May 1799 – 12 September 1810), died in childhood
- Hon. Charlotte FitzGerald-de Ros (1801–1813), died in childhood
- Hon. Henrietta Mabel FitzGerald-de Ros (1802 – 22 December 1879), married on 24 October 1828 John Broadhurst of Foston Hall (d. 1861)
- RAdm. Hon. John Frederick FitzGerald-de Ros (6 March 1804 – 19 June 1861)
- Augustus FitzGerald-de Ros (b. 1805), died in childhood
- Hon. Olivia Cecilia FitzGerald-de Ros (11 January 1807 – 21 April 1885), married on 22/23 October 1833 Henry Wellesley, 1st Earl Cowley
- Hon. Geraldine FitzGerald-de Ros (1809 – 28 September 1881), married on 25 November 1830 The Rev. Frederic Pare
- Hon. Cecilia FitzGerald-de Ros (1811 – 6 October 1869), married on 10 December 1835 The Hon. John Boyle (1803–1874), son of Edmund Boyle, 8th Earl of Cork and had issue
- Hon. Jane FitzGerald-de Ros (1813–1885), married Christopher Hamilton, and had issue

After petitioning King George III in 1790, she was eventually (in 1806) able to end the abeyance to the Barony of de Ros, the most ancient baronial title in England, in her favour – even though there were two other co-heirs to the barony, and she had only a quarter interest; another claimant, Sir Henry Hunloke, 4th Bt., had a half interest and was the heir general of the elder of the two sisters from whom the claims were derived. No clear explanation for the award was given by the House of Lords except an inference that Charlotte came from (or at least had married into) a better family. Charlotte legally changed her name by Royal Licence on 6 October of the same year to Charlotte FitzGerald-de Ros. Members of the de Ros family lived in Thames Ditton for a long while. They had links with the brightest of society, from the Duke of Wellington downwards. Henry's younger brother was the notorious Lord Edward FitzGerald.

Charlotte died on 9 January 1831.

Peerage of England
Vacant Abeyant since the death of George Villiers	Baroness de Ros; 1806–1831	Succeeded by Henry FitzGerald-de Ros
