= Henry FitzGerald-de Ros, 21st Baron de Ros =

- Baron de Ros
- Coat of arms
- Tenure: 1831-1839
- Predecessor: Charlotte FitzGerald-de Ros, 20th Baroness de Ros
- Successor: William FitzGerald-de Ros, 22nd Baron de Ros
- Born: Henry William FitzGerald-de Ros; 12 June 1793
- Died: 29 March 1839 (aged 45)
- Father: Lord Henry FitzGerald
- Mother: Charlotte FitzGerald-de Ros, 20th Baroness de Ros

Henry William FitzGerald-de Ros, 21st Baron de Ros (12 June 1793 – 28/29 March 1839) was a British nobleman, the son of Lord Henry FitzGerald and his wife Charlotte FitzGerald-de Ros, 20th Baroness de Ros.

Fitzgerald-de Ros briefly served as member of parliament for the borough of West Looe from 1816 to 1818. In 1831, upon the death of his mother, he inherited the Barony of de Ros, the oldest surviving barony in the Peerage of England.

He was an excellent whist player, but was involved in a gambling scandal in 1836. Lord de Ros was accused of cheating at Graham's Club by the trick of sauter la coupe, and by marking the cards with his thumbnail. He sued his accusers for libel, but lost the case. He died not long after, and was commemorated by Theodore Hook with the punning epitaph, "Here lies the premier baron of England, patiently awaiting the last trump". He died in London, unmarried and without issue.

It has been suggested that Charles Dickens may have based the character of Sir Mulberry Hawk in his novel Nicholas Nickleby to some extent on Lord de Ros, a man-about-town with a reputation for fleecing gullible young men, seducing women and various forms of swindling.

Parliament of the United Kingdom
Preceded by Charles Buller; Anthony Buller	Member of Parliament for West Looe; 1816–1818; With: Sir Charles Hulse, Bt	Succeeded by Sir Charles Hulse, Bt; Henry Goulburn
Peerage of England
Preceded by Charlotte FitzGerald-de Ros	Baron de Ros; 1831–1839	Succeeded by William FitzGerald de Ros
