= William Ogilvie (Ardglass) =

Scottish scholar (1740–1832)

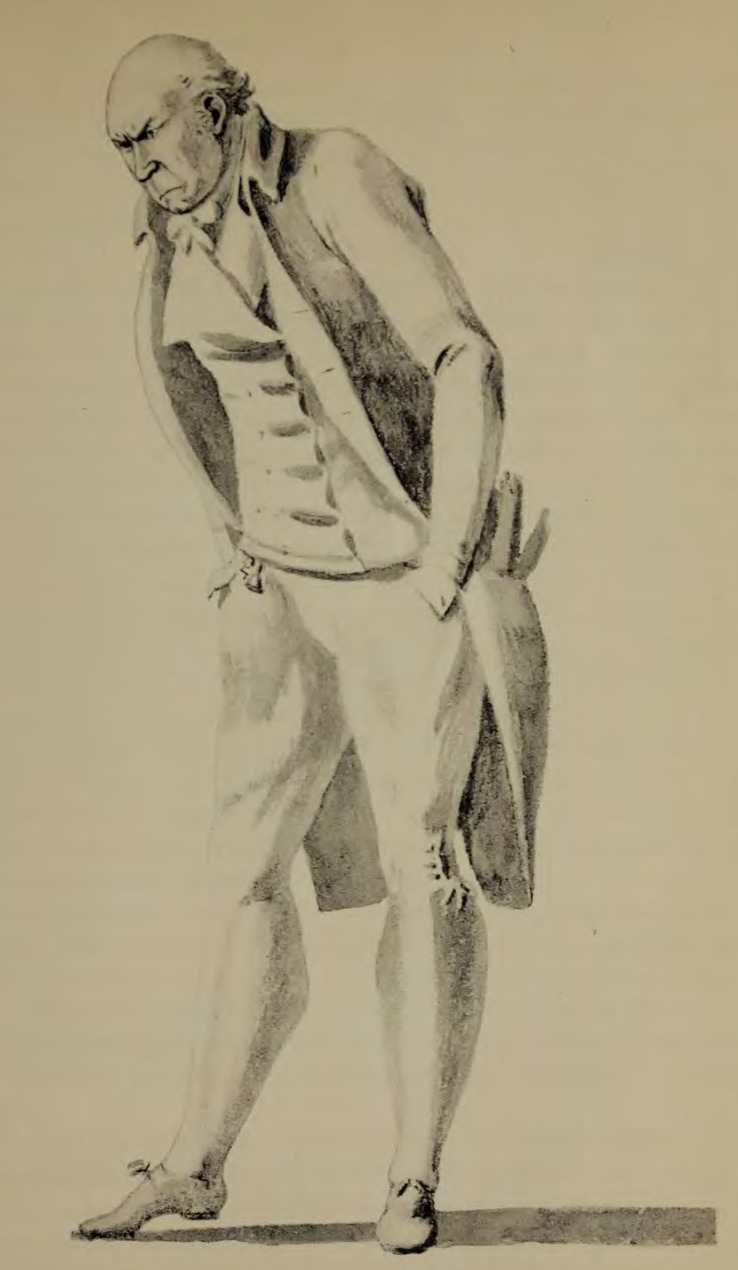
- caricature of William Ogilvie by his son in law, Charles Lock
- Born: 1740
- Died: 1832 (aged 91–92)
- Occupation: Tutoring, politician
- Spouse(s): Emily FitzGerald, Duchess of Leinster

William Ogilvie (1740–1832) was a Scottish-born scholar and tutor.

== Life ==
Details of Ogilvie's early life are unclear. The Dictionary of Irish Biography suggests several possible backgrounds: "His enemies alleged that he was from a humble background, though possibly educated at Edinburgh University ... some even said he had come to Ireland as a drummer in a Scots regiment." Another suggestion was that he was from Banff, Scotland and attended King's College, Aberdeen. He himself claimed to be related to "a baronetical family of Ogilvies".

Ogilvie was hired by Emily FitzGerald, Duchess of Leinster, to tutor her children after the death of her eldest in London. He was introduced to her by Dean Marley and was described as speaking with a harsh Scots voice, being dour, ungainly, often rude and frequently unshaven. Eccentric in his age this shy, reserved, rather grubby man believed that children were sensible immature people and had an excellent rapport with them.

He had a particular fondness for Lord Edward FitzGerald, preparing him for his military career. After leaving the army Lord Edward was appointed commander in chief of the United Irishmen just before the Irish Rebellion of 1798. Ogilvie visited him whilst he was in hiding from the authorities.

Ogilvie married Lady Emily, who continued to be known as the Dowager Duchess of Leinster, on 26 October 1774, months after the death of her husband, but their love affair had begun before his death in Frescati House. Ogilvie is known to be the biological father of Lord George Simon FitzGerald.

A further three children were born to them after their marriage:

- Cecilia Margaret Ogilvie (9 July 1775 – 1824); she married Charles Lock on 12 July 1795. They had three daughters.
- Charlotte Ogilvie (born and died 1777)
- Emily Charlotte "Mimie" Ogilvie (May 1778 – 22 January 1832); she married Charles George Beauclerk (son of Topham Beauclerk and his wife Diana Spencer; briefly an MP) on 29 April 1799. They had thirteen children.

Ogilvie purchased the Ardglass estate in County Down from his stepson Rear Admiral Lord Charles FitzGerald, and he and Lady Emily lived there for part of their marriage in Ardglass Castle. He was elected to the Irish House of Commons in 1781 for Gorey, and in 1783 for Ballyshannon, serving until 1790. In 1782 he submitted a seventeen-article proposal for the union of Ireland and England, which was unsuccessful.

He spent his latter years rebuilding the town which was once a major trading port. He successfully established a harbour here in 1813 and built public baths making the town one of the most fashionable watering places in the north of Ireland. A firm believer in self-sufficiency, Ardglass had gardens laid out for residents to grow their own produce (allotments).

He died in 1832 and his remains were interred in the Church of Ireland on Kildare Street in Ardglass. He died fondly remembered as "a man of character, a man of splendid determination, a man absolutely devoid of petty meanesses, and a man of exceptional tenderness".
