= Lord Henry FitzGerald =

The Right Honorable Lord Henry FitzGerald PC (Ire)
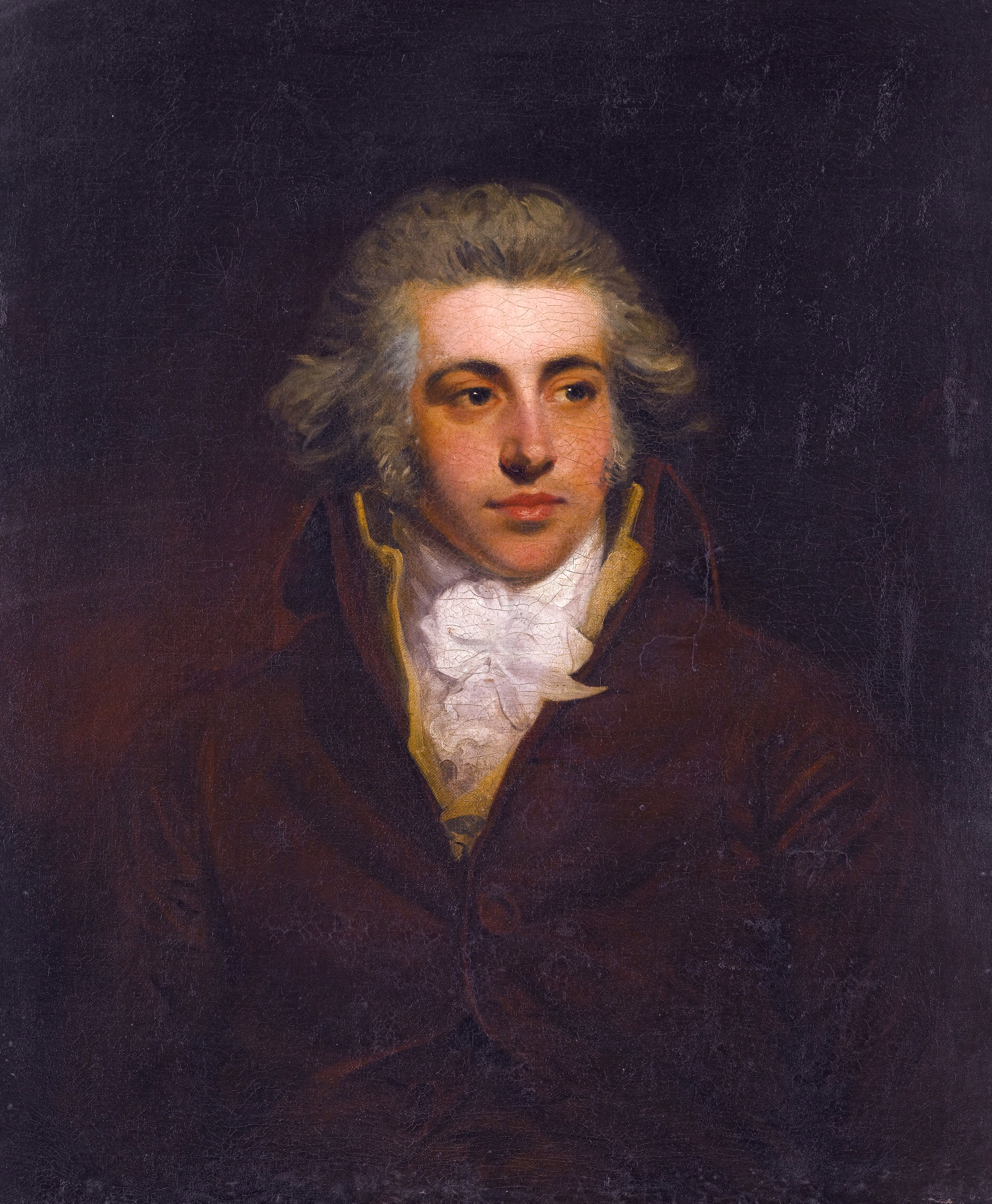
- Henry FitzGerald (John Hoppner)

Member of the Dublin Parliament for Kildare Borough
- In office 1783–1790 Serving with Simon Digby
- Preceded by: Simon Digby; Sir FitzGerald Aylmer, 6th Baronet
- Succeeded by: Simon Digby; Robert Graydon

Member of the Dublin Parliament for Athy
- In office 1790–1791 Serving with Arthur Ormsby
- Preceded by: Lord Edward FitzGerald; Thomas Burgh
- Succeeded by: Frederick John Falkiner; Arthur Ormsby

Member of the Dublin Parliament for Dublin City
- In office 1790–1797 Serving with Henry Grattan
- Preceded by: Nathaniel Warren; Travers Hartley
- Succeeded by: Arthur Wolfe; John Claudius Beresford

Member of Parliament for County Kildare
- In office 1807–1814 Serving with Robert Latouche
- Preceded by: Lord Robert FitzGerald; Robert Latouche
- Succeeded by: Robert Latouche; Lord William FitzGerald

Personal details
- Born: 30 July 1761
- Died: 9 July 1829 (aged 67) Boyle Farm, Thames Ditton, England
- Party: Whig
- Parents: James FitzGerald, 1st Duke of Leinster (father); Lady Emily Lennox (mother)

Military service
- Allegiance: Kingdom of Great Britain
- Branch/service: British Army
- Years of service: 1788–1792
- Unit: 66th Foot; 85th Foot; Coldstream Foot

Lord Henry FitzGerald PC (Ire) (30 July 1761 – 9 July 1829) was the fourth son of the 1st Duke of Leinster and the Duchess of Leinster (née Lady Emily Lennox). A younger brother was the revolutionary Lord Edward FitzGerald.

== Life ==
Fitzgerald joined the British Army and became a lieutenant in the 66th Foot in 1788, transferring as a captain in 1779 to the newly raised 85th Foot, which was posted to garrison duty in Jamaica for the duration of the American Revolutionary War. He was there promoted to major in 1781 and lieutenant-colonel in 1783, taking over command of the regiment from General Charles Stanhope, 3rd Earl of Harrington. After the 85th was disbanded in 1783 he became a captain and lieutenant-colonel in the 2nd Foot Guards in 1789 and retired from active service in 1792.

He was a Member of Parliament (MP) for Kildare Borough between 1783 and 1790 and represented then Athy between 1790 and 1791. From 1790 to 1798, he sat in the Irish House of Commons for Dublin City. On 8 July 1806, he was appointed to the Privy Council of Ireland, and from 1807 until 1814, Lord Henry served in the Parliament of the United Kingdom for County Kildare. He also held the position of one of the joint Postmasters General of Ireland from April 1806 until May 1807.

He was a member of the Kildare Street Club in Dublin and died at Boyle Farm, Thames Ditton, on 9 July 1829.

== Family ==
He married Charlotte Boyle Walsingham in London on 3/4 August 1791. Together they lived at Boyle Farm, Thames Ditton. In 1806, the abeyance of the Barony de Ros, the premier barony in the Peerage of England, was terminated in his wife's favor and she succeeded as 20th Baroness de Ros. The family then took the surname FitzGerald-de Ros.

The couple had 13 children in 21 years, of which nine survived to adulthood:

- Henry William FitzGerald-de Ros, 21st Baron de Ros (1792–1839)
- Lt. Col. Arthur John Hill FitzGerald-de Ros (21 December 1793 – 23 February 1826)
- Emily FitzGerald (1795 – unknown), died in childhood
- General William Lennox Lascelles FitzGerald-de Ros, 22nd Baron de Ros (1797–1874)
- Hon. Edmund Emilius Boyle FitzGerald-de Ros (4 May 1799 – 12 September 1810), died in childhood
- Hon. Charlotte FitzGerald-de Ros (1801–1813), died in childhood
- Hon. Henrietta Mabel FitzGerald-de Ros (1802 – 22 December 1879), married on 24 October 1828 John Broadhurst of Foston Hall (d. 1861)
- RAdm. Hon. John Frederick FitzGerald-de Ros (6 March 1804 – 19 June 1861)
- Augustus FitzGerald-de Ros (b. 1805), died in childhood
- Hon. Olivia Cecilia FitzGerald-de Ros (11 January 1807 – 21 April 1885), married on 22/23 October 1833 Henry Wellesley, 1st Earl Cowley
- Hon. Geraldine FitzGerald-de Ros (1809 – 28 September 1881), married on 25 November 1830 The Rev. Frederic Pare
- Hon. Cecilia FitzGerald-de Ros (1811 – 6 October 1869), married on 10 December 1835 The Hon. John Boyle (1803–1874), son of Edmund Boyle, 8th Earl of Cork and had issue
- Hon. Jane FitzGerald-de Ros (1813–1885), married Christopher Hamilton, and had issue

Parliament of Ireland
Preceded by Simon Digby; Sir FitzGerald Aylmer, 6th Bt	Member of Parliament for Kildare Borough; 1783–1790; With: Simon Digby	Succeeded by Simon Digby; Robert Graydon
Preceded by Lord Edward FitzGerald; Thomas Burgh	Member of Parliament for Athy; 1790–1791; With: Arthur Ormsby	Succeeded by Frederick John Falkiner; Arthur Ormsby
Preceded by Nathaniel Warren; Travers Hartley	Member of Parliament for Dublin City; 1790–1797; With: Henry Grattan	Succeeded by Arthur Wolfe; John Claudius Beresford
Parliament of the United Kingdom
Preceded by Lord Robert FitzGerald; Robert Latouche	Member of Parliament for County Kildare; 1807–1814; With: Robert Latouche	Succeeded by Robert Latouche; Lord William FitzGerald
