= Arthur Pomeroy =

18th-century Irish Anglican priest

Arthur Pomeroy, D.D. was an 18th-century Anglican priest in Ireland.

Pomeroy was born in Devon and educated at Westminster School and Trinity College, Cambridge. He was Chaplain to Arthur Capell, 1st Earl of Essex, Lord Lieutenant of Ireland from 1672 to 1677. Essex appointed him Dean of Cork on 11 February 1673. He was instituted on 5 May that year and served until his death in 1710. He was also Treasurer of Cloyne Prebendary of Kilpeacon in Limerick Cathedral and Rector of Carrigaline.
