= List of English cricketers (1787–1825) =

Early cricketers after foundation of MCC

This is a list of English cricketers who were first recorded in historically important matches played between the 1787 and 1825 seasons. (Note: Any match listed in the ACS' Important Match Guide (1981) is historically important, and therefore of the highest standard, whether or not a scorecard might exist. The same applies to numerous matches discovered by researchers since 1981. For further information, see First-class cricket.) (Note: Surviving match records to 1825 are incomplete, and any statistical compilation of a player's career in that period is based on known data only, which means the compilation must be incomplete, and therefore false if presented as fact. In addition, match scorecards were not always created, or have been lost, and the matches themselves were not always recorded in the press or other media. Scorecard data was not comprehensive: e.g., bowling analyses lacked balls bowled and runs conceded; bowlers were not credited with wickets when the batsman was caught or stumped; in many matches, the means of dismissal were omitted.) With the single exception of Thomas Lord, whose new ground was opened at the beginning of the 1787 season, players who were first recorded before the beginning of that season are omitted from this list, as they may be found in List of English cricketers (1701–1786).

The principal club throughout the period was MCC, which was founded in 1787, soon after Lord's ground opened. MCC organised the early Gentlemen v Players matches, and most of the games played by occasional XIs such as Charles Lennox's XI, Lord Frederick Beauclerk's XI, George Osbaldeston's XI, and others. Inter-county cricket was rare during the Napoleonic Wars, and there were no formally-constituted county clubs at the time. The main county teams were Berkshire, Essex, Hampshire, Kent, Middlesex, Surrey, and Sussex. Towards the end of the period, Cambridge University (CUCC) became prominent, especially through its series of matches against the Cambridge Town Club (CTC), which ultimately formed the basis of the original Cambridgeshire County Cricket Club. In the north of England, cricket was developing through town clubs which became the focal points of the game in their respective counties, especially Nottingham and Sheffield.

The game of cricket in this period had already acquired most of its modern features such as eleven-a-side, the three-stump wicket, the lbw law, and so on, though pitch preparation was rudimentary, and play was largely dictated by the weather. The main difference was in bowling which was still mostly underarm, the key development of the time being the movement towards roundarm which began in the late 18th century, and was gathering pace by 1826.

Note #1: The list is not necessarily exhaustive, as ongoing research is always likely to discover additional information.
Note #2: Where inline citations accompany a player's name, they reference his debut or earliest-known mention in the sources.
Note #3: Offline sources for the first quarter of the 19th century are much less plentiful than for the 18th century. Essentially, the one major source for the years 1801–1825 is Arthur Haygarth's 'Scores & Biographies' (Volume 1). While online databases were completely excluded from List of English cricketers (1701–1786), many entries in this list are sourced to CricketArchive, but: ONLY in respect of name, team, and years active; NOTHING statistical.
Therefore, all players are sourced either to Haygarth, or to CricketArchive from 1787 to 1825.
Note #4: Unless specified as single wicket, a "match" is eleven-a-side, and also historically important.
Note #5: Where a player's name is preceded by a † symbol, the article is a redirect to this list.

== A ==
=== Notable players ===
- Benjamin Aislabie (MCC, 1808–1841)
- Charles Andrew (Sussex, 1814–1824)
- Charles Anguish (MCC, 1788–1795)
- William Ashby (Kent, 1808–1830)
- Thomas Assheton Smith I (MCC, 1787–1796)
- Thomas Assheton Smith II (MCC, 1796–1820)
- Robert Ayling (Kent, 1796)
- William Ayling (Kent/Sussex, 1800–1826)

=== Other players ===
- † Abbott (Lord F. Beauclerk's XI, 1802–1804)
- W. Ainsworth (Leicester, 1813) (Note: The Leicestershire and Rutland Cricket Club played several games as a combined team (Leics & Rutland), but was also active under the titles of both Leicester and Leicestershire (and in one minor 1814 match as Rutland). Several of the players in this list were members of teams using more than one of these titles. In that event, they are allocated primarily to Leicestershire & Rutland if one of their teams had that title; secondly to Leicestershire, again if they played under that title; and to Leicester if they did not play in a county match. Those who played only for the combined Nottinghamshire & Leicestershire team in 1803 are noted separately.)
- † Allen (Cambridge University, 1820)
- S. Allen (Leicester, 1821–1825)
- † W. Allen (Essex, 1787–1793)
- C. Anderson (Leicester, 1813–1828)
- † Annett (Hampshire, 1788–1792)
- John Antill (Leicester, 1813–1823)
- E. Arnold (Leicester, 1800)
- † Ashurst (MCC, 1802)

== B ==
=== Notable players ===
- James Baker (Sussex, 1816–1828)
- George Barnard (CUCC, 1825–1826)
- Henry W. Barnard (Kent, 1815–1823)
- John Barnard (Kent, 1815–1829)
- Charles James Barnett (MCC, 1820–1840)
- William Barton (Middlesex, 1795–1817)
- Horace Bates (Kent, 1822–1832)
- William Battcock (Sussex, 1814–1817)
- Thomas Battersbee (Kent/MCC, 1822–1831)
- Robert Battiscombe (CUCC, 1819–1821)
- John Bayley (MCC/Surrey, 1822–1850)
- John Bayley (Hants/MCC, 1817–1843)
- Charles Bayly (Sussex, 1825)
- Henry Beagley (The Bs, et al., 1825–1844)
- John Beagley (Hampshire, 1823–1826)
- Thomas Beagley (Hampshire, 1816–1844)
- Lord Frederick Beauclerk (MCC, 1791–1825)
- William Beauclerk (Hants/MCC, 1817–1827)
- Charles Beckett (Old Etonians, 1816–1817)
- Richard Beckett, (MCC, et al., 1803–1807)
- James Beeston (Middlesex, 1794–1808)
- George Beldham (Surrey, 1800–1805)
- James Bennett (Hampshire, 1794–1795)
- John Bennett (Hampshire, 1797–1818)
- Lord William Bentinck (MCC, 1791)
- Henry Bentley (MCC, 1798–1822)
- John Bentley (Middlesex, 1807–1817)
- Richard Berens (Hampshire, 1819–1830)
- Henry Bird (CTC, 1819–1826)
- William Bird (CTC, 1821–1822)
- Edward Bligh (MCC/Kent, 1789–1813)
- Edward Bligh (CUCC, 1819)
- John Duncan Bligh (MCC, 1822)
- John Boning (CTC, 1822–1847)
- † George Booth (Middlesex, 1796–1804)
- James Borradaile (MCC, 1822)
- William Borradaile (MCC, 1815–1832)
- Charles Bowdler (Surrey, 1809)
- John Bowyer (Surrey, 1810–1828)
- Thomas Boxall (Kent, 1789–1803)
- † John Brand (MCC, 1815–1828)
- James Bray (Sussex, 1816–1827)
- James Brett (MCC, 1810)
- Samuel Bridger (Surrey, 1804–1825)
- William Brittain (Nottingham, 1800)
- Jem Broadbridge (Sussex, 1814–1840)
- † Robert Broadbridge (Sussex, 1822–1827)
- William Broadbridge (Sussex, 1817–1837)
- George Brown (Sussex, 1819–1839)
- Robert Brudenell (MCC, 1790–1793)
- George Brummell (Hampshire, 1807)
- E. H. Budd (MCC, et al., 1804–1831)
- Anthony Buller (MCC, 1795–1797)
- Thomas Burgoyne (Middlesex, 1799–1816)
- Henry Burrows (MCC, et al., 1801–1821)
- Henry Burslem (E. Bligh's XI, 1810–1813)
- James Burt (Hants/MCC, 1825–1832)
- Anthony Burton (Kent, 1822–1827)
- Stephen Butcher (Surrey/Kent, 1787–1793)
- Archibald Button (Surrey/Hants, 1798–1804)

=== Other players ===
- † Thomas Bache (MCC, 1816–1822)
- † Samson Baker (Kent, 1823)
- W. Bakewell (Leicester, 1813)
- S. Baldiste (Leicester, 1800)
- Ballard (Sir Horatio Mann's XI, 1789)
- † William Barker (Nottingham, 1789–1792)
- Barrett (Leicestershire, 1791)
- † William Barsby (Leics & Rutland, 1787–1792)
- J. Barton (MCC, 1802)
- † Bates (Kent, 1789)
- † Baxter (CTC, 1819)
- † R. Beeston (Middlesex, 1790)
- † W. Beeston (Middlesex, 1790–1801)
- † John Beldham (Surrey, 1794–1795)
- Henry Bell (Leicester, 1787)
- † C. Bentley (MCC, 1809–1832)
- † Berry (Surrey, 1825)
- † Bexley (Berkshire, 1794)
- G. Billington (Leicester, 1821–1825)
- S. Billington (Leicester, 1823–1825)
- † R. Black (Leics & Rutland, 1789–1800)
- † Blundell (MCC, 1812)
- † Blunt (MCC, 1792)
- John Boam (Leicester, 1813–1823)
- † Bond (MCC, 1810)
- † Bonick (Surrey, 1789)
- † John Bott (Middlesex, 1807–1808)
- † A. Boult (Middlesex, 1787)
- † George Boult Jr (Montpelier, 1797)
- † Z. Boult (Middlesex, 1787)
- † Bourke (MCC, 1798)
- † H. Bowley (Sussex, 1823)
- † Brades (Berkshire, 1795)
- † R. Brandling (MCC, 1794)
- † W. J. Brereton (Norfolk, 1820)
- † Briden (MCC, 1794–1798)
- † Harry Bridger (Middlesex, 1793–1796)
- † Bridges (Homerton, 1808)
- † Bridges (CTC, 1819–1820)
- † Brown (MCC, 1814)
- † Brown (Middlesex, 1789–1791)
- † B. A. Browne (MCC, 1817)
- † T. Browning (Kent, 1795)
- † William Browning (Kent, 1791–1795)
- † C. Brunton (Norfolk, 1820)
- † Samuel Bullock (CTC, 1825–1827)
- † J. Burbage (CTC, 1825)
- † John Burgess (Kent, 1794–1795)
- † Butler (Middlesex, 1789–1801)
- † Butterly (MCC, 1787)
- † Zachariah Button (MCC, 1793–1796)

== C ==
=== Notable players ===
- Benjamin Caesar (Godalming/Surrey, 1824–1830)
- Will Caldecourt (CTC, 1821–1844)
- Hon. Edward Capel (MCC, 1790)
- William Capel (MCC, 1796–1808)
- Edmund Carter (MCC/Hants, 1809–1816)
- Charles Challen (Sussex, 1814)
- William Challen (Sussex, 1814)
- Charles Chapman (CUCC, 1825–1831)
- Richard Cheslyn (MCC/Sussex, 1825–1846)
- George Claridge (Hants/Kent, 1818–1829)
- Thomas Clark (Essex, 1787–1791)
- William Clarke (Nottingham, 1817–1855)
- Benjamin Clifton (Middlesex, 1797–1798)
- Charles Cochran (Epsom, 1819)
- Samuel Cockerill (MCC, 1817–1819)
- George Coles (CUCC, 1819–1820)
- David Collins (Hants, 1791–1792)
- William Cookesley (CUCC, 1822–1827)
- William Courtenay (MCC, 1797)
- Thomas Coventry (MCC, 1800–1801)
- John Crawte (Kent, 1788–1803)
- Thomas Crimble (Hampshire, 1823–1825)
- Frederick Crowder (CUCC, 1817–1820)
- Charles Cumberland (MCC, 1791–1804)
- Frederick Cuthbert (MCC, 1816–1817)

=== Other players ===
- † Cantrell (Middlesex, 1789–1792)
- † Capron (Sussex, 1792)
- † Carpenter (Hampshire, 1789)
- † Carr (Essex, 1789–1791)
- † Carter (Berkshire, 1793–1795)
- † John Carter (Nottingham, 1789)
- † G. N. Caswell (MCC, 1818)
- William Chapman (Nottingham, 1791–1803)
- † Chippendale (WCC, 1788)
- † Chitty (Surrey, 1796–1800)
- † Church (Kent, 1789–1795)
- † Clair (Hampshire, 1797–1803)
- † Clarke (MCC, 1818)
- † John Clarke (Leics & Rutland, 1792–1823)
- † William Clarke (Leics & Rutland, 1787–1792)
- W. Clarke (Leicester, 1813)
- † Clements (Essex, 1787–1790)
- † Clifton (MCC, 1817)
- † Close (MCC, 1817)
- Captain Codrington (MCC, 1796–1797)
- † G. Cole (MCC, 1811)
- † Collins (Surrey, 1809)
- C. Colston (Leicester, 1821)
- G. Colston (Leicester, 1821–1825)
- Cook (Windsor Forest, 1788)
- † G. Cooper (MCC, 1797–1807)
- † Silas Cooper (Sussex, 1805–1815)
- Coppuck (Surrey, 1788)
- † Major Cowell (MCC, 1817)
- Cox (Amherst's XI, 1789)
- † J. Cox (MCC, 1817)
- † Cropley (CTC, 1822)

== D ==
=== Notable players ===
- James Dale (Sussex, 1823–1827)
- Earl of Dalkeith (MCC, 1797)
- Benjamin Dark (Middx/Hants, 1814–1826)
- James Dark (Middx/MCC, 1815–1843)
- Earl of Darnley (MCC/Kent, 1789–1796)
- Henry Dawson (Hampshire, 1819)
- James de Visme (MCC, 1825)
- John Deedes (Kent, 1822–1828)
- William Deedes Sr (MCC, 1817–1826)
- George Dehaney (MCC, 1789–1793)
- Robert Denn (Essex, 1787–1793)
- David Denne (Kent, 1823)
- Joseph Dennis (Nottingham, 1800–1829)
- Charles Dilloway (Sussex, 1825)
- John Dilloway (Sussex, 1825)
- John Dolphin (CUCC, 1825–1827)
- Hon. Charles Douglas (MCC, 1797–1801)
- Charles Duff (Sussex, 1824–1830)
- Timothy Duke (Kent, 1823–1828)
- Francis Dunham (MCC, 1815)
- George Dupuis (Essex, 1787; MCC 1791–1792)
- John Dyke (Kent, 1822)
- W. C. Dyer (Hants/MCC, 1820–1825)
- Percyvall Dyke (Kent/MCC, 1822–1837)
- Thomas Dyke (MCC/Kent, 1824–1827)

=== Other players ===
- † Dalby (CTC, 1820)
- † Dale (Middlesex, 1789–1809)
- † J. Davies (CTC, 1825–1832)
- George Davis (Leicestershire, 1787–1791)
- Henry Davis (Leicester, 1823–1839)
- † S. Davis (MCC, 1804)
- † Davy (Hampshire, 1804)
- † Davy (Surrey, 1787–1788)
- † Dean (Middx/Mann's XI, 1787–1791)
- † Dennis (MCC, 1791)
- A. Dent (Leicester, 1813)
- S. Dexter (Leicester, 1821)
- John Dix (Leicester, 1813)
- † Donnithorn (MCC, 1798)
- † Downham (Leigh's XI/MCC, 1795)
- † Captain J. Drew (Kent, 1795)
- † G. Drummond (Surrey, 1787–1795)
- Dufty (Leicester, 1787)
- † John Durnford (CTC, 1825)
- † Dyer (MCC, 1814)
- † R. Dyke (Surrey, 1819)

== E ==
=== Notable players ===
- Richard Elmhirst (CUCC, 1822)
- John Evans (Kent, 1822–1823)
- Henry Everett (MCC, 1812–1839)
- Marquess of Exeter (William Ward's XI, 1817)

=== Other players ===
- John Earl (Leicester, 1821–1848)
- John East (Leicester, 1825–1828)
- † J. Eavers (MCC, 1798–1802)
- R. Eddowes (Leicester, 1813)
- † Ellis (Middlesex, 1815)
- † Elyard (MCC, 1802)
- Everett (WCC, 1788)

== F ==
=== Notable players ===
- Henry Faithful (Sussex, 1823)
- George Fauquier (CUCC, 1819–1821)
- George Fenner (CTC, 1821)
- James Fenner (CTC, 1821)
- Richard Fielder (Kent, 1790–1801)
- Henry Fitzroy (Surrey, 1788–1793)
- Thomas Flavel (Surrey, 1821–1828)
- Henry Floyd (E. H. Budd's XI, 1817)
- Francis Foster (Hampshire, 1789)
- Andrew Freemantle (Hampshire, 1788–1810)

=== Other players ===
- J. Farrand (Leicester, 1800)
- T. Fielding (Leicester, 1789)
- † J. Finch (Berkshire, 1792–1795)
- † Flint (Surrey, 1790)
- † Forster (Hampshire, 1825)
- George Foster (Hampshire, 1789)
- † Frances (MCC, 1811)
- † French (Darnley's XI, 1790)
- † Robert Frost (Norfolk, 1820)

== G ==
=== Notable players ===
- William Hall Gage (Beauclerk's XI, 1796–1802)
- John Gibbons (MCC, 1797–1801)
- Joseph Gilbert (Nottingham, 1789–1792)
- John Goldham (Middlesex, 1791–1812)
- John Goldsmith (Hampshire, 1792)
- Charles Goodall (Nottingham, 1813–1827)
- Bellingham Graham (Middlesex, 1815)
- William Greenway (CUCC, 1819–1820)
- John Greenwood (CUCC, 1820–1821)
- William Greenwood (MCC, 1818)
- Algernon Greville (MCC, 1815–1823)
- Charles Greville (MCC, 1819–1827)
- James Grinham (Sussex, 1822–1835)
- J. S. Grover (MCC, 1790)
- John Gunnell (Surrey, 1810)
- Philip Gurdon (Norfolk/CUCC, 1820–1822)
- William Gurdon (CUCC, 1825)
- John Guthrie (CUCC, 1819)

=== Other players ===
- Thomas Gamble (Leicester, 1825–1829)
- William Gamble (Leicester, 1821–1829)
- † Gates (Berkshire, 1794–1807)
- † Gibbs (Middlesex, 1787)
- † Gibbs (Surrey, 1807)
- † S. Gill (Berkshire, 1792–1795)
- † Gillan (MCC, 1809)
- † Goddard (Hampshire, 1803–1808)
- † Goodhew (Kent, 1789–1795)
- † Gore (MCC, 1814)
- † Goules (MCC, 1817)
- † Mark Graham (Leics & Rutland, 1787–1800)
- † N. Graham (Middlesex, 1787–1801)
- † Grange (Middlesex, 1789–1792)
- † Granger (Middlesex, 1789–1792)
- † Greathead (MCC, 1808)
- † Greenham (Hampshire, 1798)
- † Gregory (Sussex, 1791–1792)
- † Grenway (Hampshire, 1819)
- † Grinstead (Kent, 1788)
- † Groombridge (Essex, 1789–1793)
- † Grover (Surrey, 1809)
- † W. Gunnell (Surrey, 1797)

== H ==
=== Notable players ===
- Edward Hale (Hampshire, 1789–1797)
- James Hall (CTC, 1821–1838)
- John Hammond (Sussex, 1790–1816)
- Harry Hampton (Surrey, 1800–1811)
- Henry Hannington (CUCC, 1819–1821)
- William Harbord (MCC, 1791)
- James Harding (Surrey, 1792–1810)
- John Harding (Surrey, 1809)
- George Harrison (Nottingham, 1789–1792)
- John Heathcote (CUCC, 1820)
- Samuel Hedderley (Nottingham, 1789–1791)
- Edward Heneage (Surrey, 1796)
- Philip Hewett (CUCC, 1820)
- George Hoare (Surrey, 1807–1812)
- Henry Hoare (MCC, 1823–1824)
- Henry Holland (Hampshire, 1807–1825)
- George Hollest (CUCC, 1821)
- Charles Holloway (Hampshire, 1816–1822)
- William Hooker (Sussex, 1823–1833)
- Humphrey Hopkin (Nottingham, 1791–1825)
- William Hopkins (CUCC, 1825–1828)
- Thomas Howard (Hants/MCC, 1803–1828)
- George Hume (CUCC, 1821)

=== Other players ===
- † Hall (MCC, 1797)
- J. Hall (Leicester, 1789)
- T. Hall (Leicester, 1800)
- † J. Hampton (Surrey, 1793–1816)
- † R. Hampton (MCC, 1802)
- † Harrington (Surrey, 1790)
- R. Harris (Leicester, 1800)
- W. Harris (Leicester, 1813)
- Robert Harrison (Leicester, 1787)
- † Hart (Brighton, 1792)
- † Harvey (Essex, 1792–1793)
- † F. Hatton (MCC, 1815)
- † Hawkins (MCC, 1817)
- † Hennell (MCC, 1817)
- Henson (Leicester, 1823)
- † Hesketh (MCC, 1816)
- Peter Heward (Leicester, 1821–1845)
- † Hicks (Essex, 1789–1799)
- † Hill (Sussex, 1825)
- † Hines (Kent, 1822)
- † Hockley (Surrey/Hants, 1799–1805)
- † Hodgson (Hampshire, 1817)
- † Holden (MCC, 1818)
- † C. Holland (Homerton, 1808)
- Holton (Windsor Forest, 1788)
- † Honer (Surrey, 1822)
- † Hooker (Kent, 1795)
- † Hopkinson (MCC, 1817)
- † James Hopper (Kent, 1822–1827)
- † Horsey (Hampshire, 1788–1789)
- † H. C. Howard (Middlesex, 1815)
- † R. Howard (Surrey, 1804)
- † Hudson (Sussex, 1792)
- † Hull (Surrey, 1821)
- † Hunt (Hampshire, 1788–1796)
- † Hyde (Sussex, 1791)

== I ==
=== Notable players ===
- Thomas Ingram (Surrey, 1787–1798)

== J ==
=== Notable players ===
- David James (Old Etonians, 1816–1817)
- Charles Jarvis (Nottingham, 1826)
- William Jefferies (Nottingham, 1800–1818)
- Herbert Jenner (CUCC/MCC, 1825–1838)
- William Jolliffe (Hampshire, 1825)
- John Thomas Jones (Middlesex, 1814–1819)
- James Jordan (Kent, 1822–1824)
- Henry Jupp (Godalming, 1824–1827)

=== Other players ===
- † J. Jackson (Leicestershire, 1794–1800)
- † J. James (MCC, 1814)
- † W. Jeans (MCC, 1817)
- † John Jenner (Middlesex, 1807–1826)
- W. Jennings (Leicester, 1813)
- Johnson (Mann's XI, 1789)
- † Johnson (Middlesex, 1801)
- † T. Johnson (CTC, 1825–1834)
- † Johnston (Montpelier, 1798–1800)
- † Jones (Essex, 1787)
- † Jones (Surrey, 1824)
- Judd (Leicestershire, 1791)
- † Thomas Jutten (Sussex, 1791–1792)

== K ==
=== Notable players ===
- John Lister Kaye (Surrey/MCC, 1787–1798)
- William Keen (Surrey, 1821–1831)
- Henry Kingscote (MCC, et al., 1825–1844)
- Douglas Kinnaird (MCC, 1818–1822)
- Edward Knight (MCC/Kent, 1822–1828)
- George T. Knight (MCC, et al., 1820–1837)

=== Other players ===
- † Kennett (East Kent, 1789)
- Killick (Amherst's XI, 1789)
- † Daniel King (MCC, 1814)
- † Knight (MCC, 1802)
- † Knowles (Middlesex, 1790–1797)

== L ==
=== Notable players ===
- Felix Ladbroke (MCC, 1804–1826)
- James Ladbroke (Sussex, 1800–1826)
- John Lambert (MCC, 1794–1810)
- William Lambert (Surrey, et al., 1801–1817)
- Charles Lanaway (Sussex, 1825–1838)
- Henry T. Lane (MCC/West Kent, 1817–1827)
- Richard Lane (MCC, 1820–1824)
- William Lascelles (E. H. Budd's XI, 1818)
- James Lawrell (MCC, 1800–1810)
- James Lawrence (CTC, 1820)
- Stephen Lefeaver (Kent, 1825)
- Richard Leigh Jr (Surrey, 1806–1809)
- George Leycester (MCC, 1790–1808)
- Henry Lillywhite (Hampshire, 1816–1825)
- James Lillywhite (Hampshire, 1821)
- William Lillywhite (Sussex, 1825–1853)
- Henry J. Lloyd (, 1815–1830)
- Thomas Lloyd (Berkshire, 1792)
- Thomas Lord (Middlesex, 1787–1815)
- Thomas Lord Jr (Middlesex, 1815–1816)
- Henry Lowther (MCC, 1819–1843)
- Stephen Lushington (Surrey, 1799)

=== Other players ===
- Lawrence (Leics & Rutland, 1792)
- Le Gros, J. (WCC, 1788)
- Le Gros, W. (WCC, 1788)
- † Lea (MCC, 1807)
- † John Leaney (Kent, 1825–1826)
- † William Leaney (Kent, 1815)
- † Lear (MCC, 1808)
- † Lee (MCC, 1814)
- † Leeson (MCC, 1803)
- † J. Leggatte (MCC, 1789–1790)
- † Thomas Liffen (Sussex, 1791–1792)
- † James Light (Sussex, 1825)
- Line (Leicestershire, 1791)
- † John Littler (Essex, 1791–1793)
- Longhurst, H. (Surrey, 1788)
- Longhurst, T. (Surrey, 1788)
- William Lovett (Leicester, 1813)
- † Luck (Kent, 1793)

== M ==
=== Notable players ===
- Peregrine Maitland (MCC/Surrey, 1798–1808)
- Noah Mann Jr (MCC, 1807–1818)
- George Marten (CUCC, 1821)
- Henry Martin (MCC, 1796–1813)
- Richard Martin (Sussex, 1815–1816)
- William Mathews (Surrey, 1821–1830)
- George Meads (Sussex, 1825–1836)
- Francis Mellersh (Sussex, 1815–1830)
- Thomas Mellish (MCC, 1791–1815)
- Paul Methuen (MCC, 1816)
- John Miller (Old Etonians, 1791)
- George Mills (Kent, 1825–1831)
- John Mills (Hampshire, 1816–1820)
- Richard Mills (Kent, 1825–1843)
- Lord Milsington (Hampshire, 1792–1799)
- Charles Mitford (Middlesex, 1815)
- Edward Morant (MCC, 1793–1795)
- Henry Morley (Sussex, 1815–1838)
- John Moultrie (CUCC, 1820)
- † Samuel Mugglestone (Nottingham, 1789–1791)
- Robert Murcutt (CTC, 1819–1820)

=== Other players ===
- † J. Maddox (MCC, 1791)
- † Mansfield (Middlesex, 1790)
- † March (MCC, 1807)
- † Marclew (Kent, 1795)
- † Martin (Hampshire, 1816)
- † W. Martin (CTC, 1819–1826)
- † Stephen Masters (Kent, 1815)
- † Matthews (Middlesex, 1789)
- † May (Hampshire, 1797–1798)
- † S. Maynard (Hampshire, 1823–1828)
- † Medlicott (CTC, 1819–1822)
- † J. Merchant (Sussex, 1791–1792)
- Merritt (Surrey, 1788)
- † Miles (Essex, 1791–1793)
- Miller (MCC, 1791)
- † H. Mitchell (Hampshire, 1816–1819)
- † Mitchell (Surrey, 1803–1809)
- † Monk (Berkshire, 1792–1795)
- J. Moore (Leicester, 1813)
- W. Moore (Leicester, 1813)
- † Morgan (MCC, 1802)
- † Morgan (Notts & Leics, 1803)
- † Mott (CTC, 1820)
- G. Mounteney (Leicester, 1821)
- † Munday (Hampshire, 1792–1801)
- † Mundy (MCC, 1801)
- † Murray (Essex, 1787–1789)

== N ==
=== Notable players ===
- Thomas Neape (Nottingham, 1800)
- Molyneux Nepean (MCC, 1808)
- Christopher Nevill (CUCC, 1820–1822)
- Francis Nicholas (Hants/MCC, 1821–1830)
- T. V. R. Nicoll (Middlesex, 1788–1794)
- Thomas Nicoll (Hants/MCC, 1817–1835)
- Thomas Nordish (Kent, 1805–1823)

=== Other players ===
- † J. Neale (Hampshire, 1788–1792)
- † J. Needham (Leicestershire, 1787–1789)
- T. Neill (Leicestershire, 1791)
- † J. Nesbit (MCC, 1812)
- † Nethercliffe (Hampshire, 1817)
- R. Newton (Leicester, 1813)
- † Nicholson (Kent, 1788)
- Nightingale (Surrey, 1788)
- † J. Nutt (Leicestershire, 1789)
- Nyland (Hampshire, 1789)

== O ==
=== Notable players ===
- Henry Oakes (CUCC, 1819)
- Denzil Onslow Sr (MCC, 1796–1807)
- Denzil Onslow Jr (CUCC, 1821–1825)
- Thomas Onslow (Surrey, 1801–1808)
- George Osbaldeston (MCC, et al., 1808–1830)
- John Otway (Gentlemen, 1824–1825)
- William Otway (Gentlemen, 1824–1825)
- Charles Oxenden (CUCC, 1820–1822)
- Graham Oxenden (CUCC, 1822)

=== Other players ===
- Ogle (WCC, 1788)
- † Oliver (Middlesex, 1787)
- † Oliver (Surrey, 1824–1828)
- † Owen (CTC, 1819)
- George Owston (Leicester, 1821–1829)
- † W. Oxley (Essex, 1790–1793)

== P ==
=== Notable players ===
- Henry Page (CTC, 1819–1826)
- John Page (CTC, 1819–1822)
- Martin Page (CTC, 1820–1834)
- Henry Palliser (MCC, 1822)
- George Parry (MCC/Surrey, 1818–1829)
- William Peto (Godalming, 1822–1826)
- Charles Pierpoint (Sussex, 1825–1827)
- Fuller Pilch (Norfolk/Kent, 1820–1854)
- Nathaniel Pilch (Norfolk, 1820–1836)
- William Pilch (Norfolk, 1820–1836)
- John Pilcher (Kent, 1787–1796)
- Alexander Pitcairn (MCC, 1791–1792)
- William Pitt (MCC, 1822)
- John Pointer (Hampshire, 1803–1810)
- John Pontifex (MCC, 1796–1810)
- Lord Porchester (MCC, 1822)
- James Powell (MCC, 1818–1822)
- Littleton Powys (Surrey, 1801)
- Bulkley Praed (MCC, 1822)
- Stephen Pryor (CTC, 1820)

=== Other players ===
- † Packer (Middlesex, 1790)
- † Page (MCC, 1791)
- Pallett (Leicester, 1824)
- † J. Palmer (MCC, 1813)
- † W. Palmer (Kent, 1789–1795)
- † Park (MCC, 1795)
- † Parker (Hampshire, 1803–1806)
- † Parsons (Surrey, 1825)
- † Payne (MCC, 1815)
- † T. Payne (Surrey, 1795)
- † J. Pemberton (MCC, 1816)
- † Penniells (Surrey, 1809)
- † J. Peppercorn (MCC, 1802–1804)
- † Petley (MCC, 1802)
- J. Phipps (Leicester, 1813)
- † Pike (MCC, 1810)
- Piper (Surrey, 1788)
- † John Pontifex (Godalming, 1825)
- † J. Poulet (MCC, 1811–1818)
- Price (WCC, 1788)
- † T. Price (Hampshire, 1816–1825)
- † Priest (Sussex, 1792)
- Pullin (Leics & Rutland, 1792)
- Puttoo (Mann's XI, 1789)

== Q ==
=== Notable players ===
- William Quarles (Norfolk/Suffolk, 1820–1830)

=== Other players ===
- † Robert Quarme (Berkshire, 1792–1793)
- † Quiddington (Surrey, 1807)

== R ==
=== Notable players ===
- Robert Radcliffe (CUCC, 1819)
- Thomas Ray (Berkshire/Middx, 1792–1811)
- Humphrey Repton (MCC, 1812–1817)
- Frederic Reynolds (MCC, 1795–1796)
- James Rice (MCC, 1811–1813)
- George Ring (Kent, 1796)
- William Roberts (Old Etonians, 1816–1817)
- Robert Robinson (Surrey, 1792–1819)
- Charles Rocke (Kent, 1822–1828)
- Samuel Rohde (Osbaldeston's XI, 1812)
- Edward Romilly (CUCC/MCC, 1825–1831)

=== Other players ===
- † Thomas Razell (Kent, 1809–1816)
- † Charles Reed (Kent, 1798–1810)
- † Rice (Middlesex, 1794–1801)
- † Richardson (Hampshire, 1805–1807)
- † J. Ricketts (MCC, 1816)
- † C. Ridet (Surrey, 1796)
- † Ridley (MCC, 1801)
- † Roberts (Hampshire, 1824–1825)
- † Robinson (Middlesex, 1801)
- † Robinson (Middlesex, 1816)
- † Roffey (MCC, 1802)
- † J. Roker (Surrey, 1825–1830)
- † C. Roots (Sussex, 1825)
- † J. Rowell (Leics & Rutland, 1789–1792)
- † Rubegall (Middlesex, 1794–1798)
- † C. Russell (MCC, 1795)
- Rutten (WCC, 1788)

== S ==
=== Notable players ===
- James Saunders (Sussex, et al., 1822–1831)
- Andrew Schabner (MCC, et al., 1811–1824)
- Richard Searle (Sussex, 1822–1835)
- William Searle (Sussex, 1821–1833)
- William Sewell (MCC, 1822–1827)
- Edward Seymour (CUCC, 1819)
- Thomas Shackle (Berks/Middx, 1789–1809)
- John Shelley (Sussex/MCC, 1792–1795)
- George Shepheard (Middlesex, 1794–1799)
- James Sherman (Surrey, 1810–1821)
- John Sherman (Surrey/Manchester, 1809–1852)
- John Slater (Sussex, 1825–1829)
- William Slater (Sussex, 1815–1829)
- Eli Small (Hampshire, 1788–1796)
- Gustavus T. Smith (MCC, 1815–1823)
- Percy Smith (CUCC, 1825)
- Robert Smith (Nottingham, 1800–1803)
- Stephen Southon (Kent, 1825–1826)
- John Sparks (Surrey, 1803–1829)
- Daniel Stacey (MCC, 1817–1820)
- Thomas Stearn (CTC, 1825–1840)
- John Stevens (Essex, 1789–1799)
- Thomas Stevenson (CUCC, 1822)
- Henry Stewart (Hampshire, 1788–1806)
- John Stewart (Hampshire, 1792–1797)
- Lord Strathavon (WCC/MCC, 1787–1792)
- William Streets (Nottingham, 1792–1803)
- Richard Stringer (Leics & Rutland, 1789–1803)
- Frederick Sullivan (MCC, 1821)
- Lord Sutherland (MCC, 1816)

=== Other players ===
- † Sadler (Essex/R. Leigh's XI, 1793)
- † Sale (MCC/Berkshire, 1791–1793)
- † Sanderson (MCC, 1797)
- Satchell (MCC, 1789)
- Scott (Surrey, 1788)
- † Scott (MCC, 1793–1797
- † J. Scott (CTC, 1819)
- † Thomas Selby (Kent, 1790)
- Sellers (WCC, 1788)
- † D. Sharpe (Sussex, 1792)
- W. Sharpe (Leicester, 1813–1824)
- W. Shelton (Leicester, 1824–1829)
- Shergold (Leicester, 1787)
- † Short (Surrey, 1801)
- † Simmonds (Essex, 1790–1791)
- † John Slingsby (Epsom, 1815)
- † Smith (CUCC, 1825–1826)
- Smith (Notts & Leics, 1803)
- † Smith (Surrey, 1822)
- George Smith (Leicester, 1787)
- † James Smith (Kent/Middx, 1792–1796)
- † T. Smith (MCC, 1817)
- † Soane (Charles Lennox's XI, 1795)
- † G. Sparks (Surrey, 1807)
- † Spencer (Essex, 1793)
- William Squires (Leicester, 1823–1839)
- † St John (Surrey, 1825)
- † Stanford (MCC, 1807)
- † Stanhope (Middx/MCC, 1787–1798)
- Steadman (Surrey, 1788)
- † Edward Stevenson (Nottingham, 1789–1792)
- † James Stevenson (Nottingham, 1789–1792)
- † R. Stewart (MCC, 1791–1799)
- † Stone (Middlesex, 1801)
- † Robert Stone (Kent, 1790)
- † S. Stonehewer (MCC, 1813)
- † V. Strange (MCC, 1816)
- † E. Streeter (Sussex, 1791–1792)
- † Strudwick (Surrey, 1805)
- † William Sturt (Sussex, 1815–1817)
- † J. Swan (CTC, 1825–1826)
- † Sylvester (Middlesex, 1792–1802)

== T ==
=== Notable players ===
- John Tanner (Middlesex, 1796–1826)
- James Thumwood (Hampshire, 1816–1826)
- John Thumwood (Hampshire, 1816–1821)
- Edward Thwaites (Sussex, 1825–1837)
- Charles Town (Kent, 1815–1823)
- James Townsend (MCC, 1821–1831)
- Henry Tufton (MCC, 1793–1801)
- John Tufton (MCC, 1793–1798)
- Sackville Tufton (Kent, 1791–1794)
- Thomas Twistleton (MCC, 1789–1796)

=== Other players ===
- † Talmash (Middlesex, 1790)
- † Taylor (MCC, 1817)
- John Taylor (Leicester, 1813)
- † L. Taylor (Kent, 1789–1791)
- William Taylor (Leicester, 1813)
- Thomson (Leics & Rutland, 1792)
- Thumwood (Windsor Forest, 1788)
- † Timber (Berkshire, 1792–1795)
- † Todd (MCC, 1804)
- † C. Towell (MCC, 1791)
- † Thomas Tucker (CUCC, 1822)
- † Turnbull (Surrey, 1796)
- † Robert Turner (Middlesex, 1789–1797)
- † W. Turner (MCC/Middx, 1789–1809)

== U ==
=== Notable players ===
- Arthur Upton (MCC, 1795–1808)

=== Other players ===
- † John Unstead (Kent, 1825)
- † May Upton (Sussex, 1824)

== V ==
=== Notable players ===
- Godfrey Vigne (Hampshire, 1819–1845)

=== Other players ===
- † John Vallance (Sussex, 1791–1792)
- † Philip Vallance (Sussex, 1791–1792)
- † Vane (MCC, 1802)
- † Venner (Kent, 1789–1790)
- † Viger (Surrey, 1808–1809)
- † Thomas Vigne (Surrey, 1804–1832)
- † Vincent (Surrey, 1788–1789)
- † C. Vivian (MCC, 1816)

== W ==
=== Notable players ===
- John Walker (Hants/Surrey, 1789–1806)
- John Wallington (Hants/MCC, 1817–1828)
- John Ward (Kent, 1800–1806)
- William Ward (MCC, et al., 1810–1825)
- Charles Warren (Middlesex, 1795–1826)
- John Wells (Surrey, 1787–1815)
- George Wenman (Kent, 1825–1834)
- Ned Wenman (Kent, 1825–1854)
- John Willan (Hants/MCC, 1819–1830)
- John Willes (Kent, 1806–1822)
- George Wombwell (MCC, 1792)
- George Wyndham (CUCC, 1820–1821)

=== Other players ===
- J. Wale (Leicester, 1813)
- † Walker (Kent, 1790)
- † Walker (Kent, 1822)
- † Waller (Surrey, 1800–1803)
- † Robert Walpole (MCC/Homerton, 1793–1808)
- † W. Wansell (MCC, 1802)
- † F. Ward (Hampshire, 1817)
- Warren (MCC, 1788)
- † Richard Warsop (Nottingham, 1789–1826)
- † Thomas Warsop (Nottingham, 1791–1823)
- † William Warsop (Nottingham, 1789–1817)
- † T. Watts (Leics & Rutland, 1789–1800)
- † T. Webb (Middlesex, 1789–1808)
- † G. Wells (Sussex, 1814–1821)
- † W. Wells (Middlesex, 1791–1816)
- † Welsh (MCC, 1791–1793)
- † John Wenman (Kent, 1825–1838)
- † West (Berkshire, 1794)
- † James Weston (Middlesex, 1787)
- † Wheeler (Middlesex, 1794–1797)
- † White (Hampshire, 1789–1797)
- † Jacob White (Middlesex, 1789–1791)
- † Joseph White (Surrey, 1806)
- † W. White (Middlesex, 1787–1791)
- † Wicks (CTC, 1820)
- † Henry Wilder (MCC, 1817)
- † Wilkinson (Sussex, 1824)
- † C. Wilkinson (Leicestershire, 1787–1789)
- † G. Willes (Kent, 1815)
- † Charles Williams (MCC, 1823)
- † Williams (CUCC, 1820)
- † Williams (MCC, 1798)
- † Samuel Willows (Nottingham, 1789–1792)
- Wilson (Leicester, 1813)
- † Wilson (Surrey, 1797–1809)
- † Windebank (Hampshire, 1805–1807)
- † Windsor (MCC, 1788)
- † Edward Winter (Berkshire/Kent, 1794–1815)
- † Witcher (Hampshire, 1797)
- † J. Witherdon (MCC, 1817)
- † Wood (Kent, 1789–1790)
- † Edward Woodbridge (Surrey, 1815–1819)
- † Frederick Woodbridge (Surrey, 1815–1819)
- † Woodburn (Hampshire, 1804)
- † Woodroffe (MCC/Surrey, 1799–1800)
- † Wooldridge (Hampshire, 1798)
- † Richard Wyatt (Essex, 1788–1797)
- † Wyman (MCC, 1791)

== Y ==
=== Notable players ===
- Lord Yarmouth (MCC/Surrey, 1797–1799)

=== Other players ===
- † Young (Surrey, 1801)

== See also ==
- History of English cricket (1776–1800)
- History of English cricket (1801–1825)

== Bibliography ==
- ACS (1981). A Guide to Important Cricket Matches Played in the British Isles 1709–1863. Nottingham: ACS. OCLC 85045528.
- Buckley, G. B. (1935). Fresh Light on 18th Century Cricket. Birmingham: Cotterell & Co. OCLC 23450280.
- Haygarth, Arthur (1996) [1862]. Scores & Biographies, Volume 1 (1744–1826). Kennington: Frederick Lillywhite. ISBN 978-19-00592-23-9.
- Major, John (2007). More Than A Game. London: HarperCollins. ISBN 978-00-07183-64-7 – via Internet Archive.
