= List of Marylebone Cricket Club players (1787–1826) =

Cricketers who debuted for Marylebone Cricket Club (MCC) in first-class cricket from the foundation of the club in 1787 until the end of the 1826 season are as follows. Many of the players continued to represent MCC after 1826 but they are only listed here, as it was in this period that they made their MCC debuts.

1826 was effectively the last season in which underarm bowling prevailed; the so-called "roundarm era" began in 1827 with the roundarm trial matches. Furthermore, the major source for the period, the first volume of Arthur Haygarth's Scores & Biographies, ends in 1826 and his second volume (1827–1840) begins with the roundarm trials. All players in this list are sourced to either Scores & Biographies, Volume 1 (1744–1826) or Samuel Britcher's A list of all the principal Matches of Cricket that have been played (1790 to 1805) and not to any online source.

During this period, MCC was the sport's predominant club with sole responsibility for the Laws of cricket and it was the main organiser of important matches. The club played a major role in cricket's long-term development by sustaining it through the Napoleonic Wars and providing the leadership needed to ensure its post-war recovery; during the Napoleonic Wars there was no formal county-based structure in cricket, let alone an international one, as in the two World Wars a century later. MCC played its home matches to 1826 at its three succeeding venues in London: Lord's "Old Ground" (1787–1810), Lord's "Middle Ground" (1811–1813) and the current Lord's from 1814. Although many of the players who represented the club were members or ground staff, others were associated with county clubs or teams and appeared for MCC by invitation. MCC teams have always operated at all levels of the sport and players who represented the club in minor cricket only are out of scope here (note, however, that the sources tend to treat the majority of MCC's senior matches to 1826 as important).

The details are the player's usual name followed by the span of years in which he was active as an MCC player in important matches (the span may include years in which he played in minor matches only for MCC and/or years in which he did not represent MCC in any matches) and then his name is given as it usually appeared on match scorecards (e.g., surname preceded by all initials). In cases where the player represented significant other teams besides MCC, these are given at the end of his entry.

== Key ==
- † preceding a player's name means that the original article is now a redirect to this list.

== A ==
- Earl of Aboyne (1817–1843) : Earl of Aboyne (Surrey, Kent)
- Benjamin Aislabie (1808–1841) : B. Aislabie (Surrey, Kent)
- Stephen Amherst (1791) : S. Amherst (Kent, Middlesex)
- Charles Anguish (1789–1795) : C. Anguish (Surrey, Hampshire)
- Ashurst (1802–1803) : Ashurst (MCC)
- Henry Hervey Aston (1792–1793) : H. H. Aston (Hampshire, Middlesex)

== B ==
- Thomas Bache (1820–1822) : T. O. Bache (Gentlemen)
- Henry Watson Barnard (1818) : H. W. Barnard (Kent)
- John Barnard (1818–1825) : J. Barnard (Kent)
- Charles James Barnett (1820–1840) : C. J. Barnett (Gentlemen)
- William Barton (1797–1802) : W. Barton (Middlesex)
- Sir John Bayley, 2nd Baronet (1817–1843) : J. E. G. Bayley (Hampshire, Gentlemen)
- Thomas Beagley (1822–1831) : T. Beagley (Players)
- Lord Frederick Beauclerk (1791–1825) : Lord F. Beauclerk (Hampshire)
- Richard Beckett (1803–1807) : R. Beckett (MCC)
- William Bedster (1792–1794) : W. Bedster (Kent, Middlesex, Surrey)
- James Beeston (1802) : J. Beeston (Middlesex)
- Billy Beldham (1790–1818) : W. Beldham (Kent, Surrey, Hampshire)
- Henry Bentley (1798–1818) : H. Bentley (Hampshire, Middlesex)
- John Bentley (1806–1809) : J. Bentley (Middlesex)
- Christopher Bethell-Codrington (1796–1797) : C. Bethell-Codrington (MCC)
- Hon. Edward Bligh (1789–1814) : E. Bligh (Hampshire, Kent, Middlesex, Surrey)
- John Duncan Bligh (1822) : J. D. Bligh (MCC)
- Blunt (1792) : Blunt (MCC)
- James Borradaile (1822) : J. Borradaile (MCC)
- William Borradaile (1826) : W. Borradaile (Gentlemen)
- George T. Boult (1789–1791) : G. T. Boult (Hampshire)
- William Bowra (1790) : W. Bowra (Kent, Sussex)
- Thomas Boxall (1793–1802) : T. Boxall (Kent)
- John Brand (1815–1829) : J. Brand (Gentlemen)
- Robert Brudenell, 6th Earl of Cardigan (1790–1793) : R. Brudenell (MCC)
- E. H. Budd (1806–1831) : E. H. Budd (Hampshire)
- Lord Burford (1825) : Lord Burford (Hampshire)
- Thomas Burgoyne (1802–1814) : T. J. Burgoyne (Middlesex, Gentlemen)
- Peter Burrell, 1st Baron Gwydyr (1788–1790) : P. Burrell (Kent)
- Henry Burrows (1801–1821) : H. Burrows (Middlesex)
- Butcher (1789–1790) : Butcher (Surrey, Hampshire, Kent)
- Butler (1792–1795) : Butler (Middlesex)
- † Zachariah Button (1796) : Z. Button (MCC)

== C ==
- Will Caldecourt (1822–1846) : W. H. Caldecourt (Kent, Players)
- William Capel (1796) : W. R. Capel (MCC)
- Edward Capel (1790) : T. E. Capel (MCC)
- Edmund Carter (1814) : E. Carter (Hampshire)
- G. N. Caswell (1818) : G. N. Caswell (MCC)
- Richard Cheslyn (1822–1845) : R. Cheslyn (Sussex)
- J. Church (1795) : J. Church (MCC)
- Clarke (1818) : Clarke (MCC)
- Robert Clifford (1790) : R. Clifford (Hampshire, Kent)
- Benjamin Clifton (1798) : B. Clifton (Surrey)
- Samuel Cockerill (1819) : S. P. Cockerill (Gentlemen)
- David Collins (1792) : D. Collins (Hampshire)
- Thomas Coventry (1800–1801) : T. W. Coventry (MCC)
- (Major) Cowell (1821–1828) : Major Cowell (MCC)
- J. Cox (1817) : J. Cox (MCC)
- Charles Cumberland (1791–1805) : C. Cumberland (Hampshire, Kent, Middlesex)
- Frederick Cuthbert (1816–1817) : F. Cuthbert (MCC)

== D ==
- Earl of Dalkeith (1797) : Earl of Dalkeith (MCC)
- Benjamin Dark (1826) : B. F. Dark (Middlesex, Hampshire)
- John Bligh, 4th Earl of Darnley (1789–1796) : Earl of Darnley (Kent)
- S. Davis (1804–1809) : S. Davis (MCC)
- William Deedes senior (1821–1829) : W. Deedes (Hampshire, Kent)
- George Dehany (1789–1793) : G. Dehany (MCC)
- Charles Douglas, 3rd Baron Douglas (1797–1801) : C. Douglas (MCC)
- George Dupuis (1791–1792) : G. Dupuis (Essex)
- W. C. Dyer (1824) : W. C. Dyer (Hampshire)
- Percyvall Dyke (1823–1833) : P. H. Dyke (Kent)
- Thomas Dyke (1824–1827) : T. H. Dyke (MCC)

== E ==
- Gilbert East (1788) : G. East (Berkshire)
- Henry Everett (1818–1839) : H. Y. Everett (Hampshire)

== F ==
- William Fennex (1791–1800) : W. Fennex (Hampshire, Kent, Middlesex, Essex)
- Henry FitzRoy (1788–1793) : H. W. FitzRoy (Hampshire, Middlesex, Surrey)
- Thomas Flavel (1822) : T. Flavel (Surrey, Players)

== G ==
- Gates (1802–1807) : Gates (Berkshire)
- John Gibbons (1797–1803) : J. Gibbons (MCC)
- John Goldham (1791–1795) : J. Goldham (Middlesex)
- Francis Gordon (1825–1831) : F. A. Gordon (Cambridge University)
- N. Graham (1793–1803) : N. Graham (Middlesex)
- William Greenwood (1818) : W. Greenwood (MCC)
- Algernon Greville (1816–1823) : A. F. Greville (Middlesex, Hampshire)
- Charles Greville (1824–1826) : C. C. F. Greville (Gentlemen)
- J. S. Grover (1790) : J. S. Grover (MCC)

== H ==
- John Hammond (1790–1814) : J. Hammond (Sussex, Hampshire, Kent, Middlesex)
- J. Hampton (1793–1810) : J. Hampton (Hampshire, Surrey)
- William Harbord, 2nd Baron Suffield (1791) : W. A. Harbord (Surrey)
- David Harris (1792) : D. Harris (Hampshire, Kent)
- F. Hatton (1815) : F. Hatton (MCC)
- Henry Herbert, 3rd Earl of Carnarvon (1824–1825) : H. J. G. Herbert (MCC)
- George Hoare (1807) : G. M. Hoare (Surrey)
- Henry Hoare (1822–1824) : H. Hoare (MCC)
- Hopkinson (1817) : Hopkinson (MCC)
- Thomas Howard (1808–1829) : T. C. Howard (Hampshire)
- Hunt (1789) : Hunt (Hampshire)
- Edward Hussey (1788–1796) : E. Hussey (Kent)

== I ==
- Thomas Ingram (1792–1798) : T. Ingram (Essex)

== J ==
- John Thomas Jones (1817) : J. T. Jones (Middlesex)

== K ==
- Sir John Lister Kaye, 1st Baronet (1791–1798) : J. L. Kaye (Surrey)
- Henry Robert Kingscote (1823–1832) : H. R. Kingscote (Surrey, Sussex, Gentlemen)
- Douglas Kinnaird (1808–1822) : D. J. W. Kinnaird (Surrey, Middlesex)
- Edward Knight (1822–1828) : E. Knight (Hampshire)
- George T. Knight (1825–1831) : G. T. Knight (Hampshire)

== L ==
- Felix Ladbroke (1807–1822) : F. C. Ladbroke (Surrey)
- James Ladbroke (1800–1802) : J. W. Ladbroke (Sussex)
- John Lambert (1794–1803) : J. Lambert (MCC)
- William Lambert (1807–1816) : W. Lambert (Hampshire, Surrey, Sussex)
- Henry T. Lane (1820–1825) : H. T. Lane (Hampshire)
- Richard Lane (1820–1824) : R. Lane (MCC)
- James Lawrell (1801–1807) : J. Lawrell (Surrey, Hampshire)
- Lea (1807) : Lea (MCC)
- Richard Leigh (1806–1809) : R. Leigh (Surrey, Kent)
- Charles Lennox, 4th Duke of Richmond (1789–1806) : C. Lennox (Hampshire, Surrey)
- Lord Sussex Lennox (1826–1839) : Lord S. Lennox (MCC)
- George Leycester (1790–1809) : G. Leycester (Hampshire, Surrey)
- John Littler (1793) : J. Littler (Essex)
- Henry J. Lloyd (1816–1828) : H. J. Lloyd (Gentlemen)
- Thomas Lloyd (1821) : T. Lloyd (Berkshire)
- Thomas Lord (1791–1817) : T. Lord (Hampshire, Middlesex)
- Thomas Lord junior (1816–1817) : T. Lord junior (Middlesex)
- George Louch (1788–1797) : G. Louch (Hampshire, Middlesex, Surrey)
- Henry Lowther (1817–1851) : H. C. Lowther (Surrey)

== M ==
- J. Maddox (1791): J. Maddox (MCC)
- Peregrine Maitland (1798–1808): P. Maitland (Surrey)
- Noah Mann junior (1807–1822): N. Mann junior (Hampshire)
- March (1807): March (MCC)
- Sir Henry Martin, 2nd Baronet (1795–1803): H. W. Martin (Surrey)
- Thomas Mellish (1793–1815): T. Mellish (Surrey)
- Paul Methuen, 1st Baron Methuen (1816–1844): P. Methuen (MCC)
- John Mills (1817–1830): J. Mills (Hampshire)
- Lord Milsington (1793–1799): Lord Milsington (Hampshire)
- Charles Mitford (1815): C. Mitford (Middlesex)
- George Monson (1791–1792): G. H. Monson (Hampshire, Kent, Surrey)
- Edward Morant (1795): E. G. Morant (Berkshire)
- C. Musgrave (1819–1826): C. Musgrave (MCC)

== N ==
- Molyneux Nepean, 2nd Baronet (1806–1810) : M. H. Nepean (MCC)
- Richard Newman (1793) : R. N. Newman (Essex, Kent)
- Francis Nicholas (1821–1827) : F. Nicholas (Hampshire)
- Thomas Nicoll (1818–1835) : T. Nicoll (Hampshire)
- Thomas Nicoll (1792–1796) : T. V. R. Nicoll (Middlesex)

== O ==
- Denzil Onslow (1796–1804) : D. Onslow (MCC)
- Thomas Onslow, 2nd Earl of Onslow (1801–1808) : T. Onslow (Surrey)
- George Osbaldeston (1808–1830) : G. Osbaldeston (Sussex, Surrey, Hampshire)

== P ==
- Henry Palliser (1822) : H. Palliser (MCC)
- Park (1795) : Park (MCC)
- George Parry (1818–1828) : G. F. Parry (Surrey)
- Payne (1815) : Payne (MCC)
- J. Pemberton (1816–1859) : J. Pemberton (MCC)
- Alexander Pitcairn (1791–1792) : A. Pitcairn (Hampshire)
- William Pitt (1821–1822) : W. Pitt (MCC)
- John Pontifex (1802–1809) : J. Pontifex (Gentlemen)
- J. Poulet (1813–1818) : J. Poulet (Hampshire, Sussex)
- James Powell (1818–1824) : J. Powell (Players)
- Littleton Powys (1803) : L. Powys (Surrey)
- Richard Purchase (1791–1795) : R. Purchase (Hampshire)

== R ==
- Thomas Ray (1793–1800) : T. Ray (Middlesex, Berkshire)
- Humphrey Repton (1813–1816) : H. Repton (MCC)
- † James Rice (1811–1813) : J. Rice (MCC)
- Robert Robinson (1793–1817) : R. Robinson (Surrey)
- Charles Rocke (1826–1828) : C. A. Rocke (Gentlemen)

== S ==
- Andrew Schabner (1813–1824) : A. W. Schabner (Surrey, Middlesex, Hampshire)
- Scott (1793–1797) : Scott (MCC)
- Thomas Scott (1791) : T. Scott (Hampshire)
- William Sewell (1822–1827) : W. H. Sewell (Gentlemen)
- Thomas Shackle (1789–1809) : T. Shackle (Middlesex)
- Sir John Shelley, 6th Baronet (1794–1795) : J. Shelley (Sussex)
- Jack Small (1791–1792) : J. Small junior (Hampshire)
- Gustavus T. Smith (1818–1823) : G. T. Smith (MCC)
- Thomas Assheton Smith I (1790–1795) : T. A. Smith senior (Hampshire)
- Thomas Assheton Smith II (1798–1810) : T. A. Smith junior (Surrey, Hampshire)
- John Sparks (1821–1828) : J. Sparks (Players)
- Daniel Stacey (1820) : D. G. Stacey (Gentlemen
- Stanford (1807) : Stanford (MCC)
- Stanhope (1789–1801) : Stanhope (Middlesex)
- John Stevens (1802) : J. Stevens (Essex)
- Robert Stevens (1797) : R. Stevens (MCC)
- R. Stewart (1792) : R. Stewart (MCC)
- Robert Stone (1790) : R. Stone (Kent)
- V. Strange (1816) : V. Strange (MCC)
- Lord Strathavon (1788–1792) : Lord Strathavon (MCC)
- Frederick Sullivan (1821) : F. Sullivan (MCC)
- Lord Sutherland (1816) : Lord Sutherland (MCC)
- Sylvester (1793–1800) : Sylvester (Middlesex)

== T ==
- Sir George Talbot, 3rd Baronet (1788–1791) : G. Talbot (Hampshire)
- John Tanner (1808–1830) : J. Tanner (Surrey)
- Thomas Taylor (1791) : T. Taylor (Hampshire)
- Sackville Tufton, 9th Earl of Thanet (1794) : 9th Earl of Thanet (Kent)
- (Captain) Todd (1804) : Todd (MCC)
- C. Towell (1791–1792) : C. Towell (MCC)
- James Townsend (1823–1830) : J. Townsend (Gentlemen)
- Henry Tufton, 11th Earl of Thanet (1793–1801) : H. Tufton (Kent, Middlesex, Surrey)
- John Tufton (1793–1798) : J. Tufton (Middlesex)
- Robert Turner (1793–1794) : R. Turner (Middlesex)
- W. Turner (1798–1817) : W. Turner (MCC)
- Thomas Twistleton (1793–1794) : T. J. Twisleton (Surrey)
- Tyson (1788–1794) : Tyson (MCC)

== U ==
- Arthur Upton (1795–1810) : A. P. Upton (Gentlemen)

== V ==
- Viger (1814) : Viger (Surrey)
- Godfrey Vigne (1823–1849) : G. T. Vigne (Hampshire)
- Thomas Vigne (1809–1832) : T. Vigne (Surrey, Hampshire)
- C. Vivian (1816) : C. Vivian (MCC)

== W ==
- Harry Walker (1794) : H. Walker (Surrey)
- Tom Walker (1791–1808) : T. Walker (Kent, Middlesex, Surrey, Hampshire)
- John Wallington (1818) : J. C. Wallington (Hampshire)
- Robert Walpole (1793–1806) : R. Walpole (MCC)
- William Ward (1813–1841) : W. Ward (Hampshire, Surrey)
- Charles Warren (1813–1816) : C. Warren (Hampshire)
- Richard Welch (1791–1793) : R. Welch (MCC)
- John Wells (1792–1804) : J. Wells (Kent, Surrey, Hampshire)
- R. Whitehead (1798–1800) : R. Whitehead (Surrey)
- John Willan (1822–1825) : J. J. Willan (Hampshire)
- Charles Williams (1823) : C. M. Williams (MCC)
- Williams (1798) : Williams (MCC)
- George Finch, 9th Earl of Winchilsea (1788–1804) : Earl of Winchilsea (Hampshire, Kent, Middlesex, Surrey)
- J. Witherdon (1817) : J. Witherdon (MCC)
- Sir George Wombwell, 2nd Baronet (1792) : G. Wombwell (MCC)
- Richard Wyatt (1790–1797) : R. B. Wyatt (Essex)

== Y ==
- Lord Yarmouth (1797) : Lord Yarmouth (Surrey)

== See also ==
- Lists of Marylebone Cricket Club players
