= List of Gentlemen cricketers (1806–1840) =

The Gentlemen v Players fixture was first played in 1806 and, despite many difficulties in the early years, it had by 1840 become an established annual event in the English cricket calendar. Apart from the years of the two World Wars, it remained so until 1962. The purpose of the fixture was to match the best of the amateur cricketers (the Gentlemen) against the best of the paid professionals (the Players). The table below summarises the full career record in the fixture of everyone who made their debuts for the Gentlemen team in the matches played to 1840.

== Key ==
- **club** denotes the player's usual team when he represented the Gentlemen (most at the time were MCC members).
- **debut** denotes the year of the player's debut appearance for the Gentlemen.
- **final** denotes the year of the player's final appearance for the Gentlemen.
- **M** denotes the number of **matches** in which the player represented the Gentlemen.
- **runs** denotes the total number of runs scored by the player in all his matches for the Gentlemen.
- **HS** denotes the **highest score** made by the player in one innings when batting for the Gentlemen (* signifies not out).
- **wkts** denotes the total number of wickets taken by the player in all his matches for the Gentlemen.
- **BB** denotes the **best bowling** performance by the player in one innings for the Gentlemen (e.g., 3–30 means he took 3 wickets in the innings and conceded 30 runs; to 1840, runs conceded by bowlers are usually unknown, hence "?").
- players are initially listed according to the date of their debut for the Gentlemen.
- players in **bold** were **known professionals** who represented the Gentlemen as given men in order to handicap the Players.

== List ==
List of Gentlemen cricketers to 1840
name	nation	club	debut	final	M	runs	HS	wkts	BB	references
Thomas Assheton Smith II	England	Marylebone Cricket Club (MCC)	1806	1806	2	60	48	0	0–0	
Lord Frederick Beauclerk	England	MCC	1806	1824	7	207	58	14	3–?	
Billy Beldham	England	Surrey	1806	1806	1	16	16	1	1–?	
Edward Bligh	Ireland	MCC	1806	1806	2	40	22	2	1–?	
E. H. Budd	England	MCC	1806	1830	9	315	69	8	2–?	
Thomas Burgoyne	England	Middlesex	1806	1806	1	10	6*	0	0–0	
William Lambert	England	Surrey	1806	1806	2	102	57	4	4–?	
George Leycester	England	MCC	1806	1806	2	23	14	0	0–0	
John Nyren	England	Hampshire	1806	1806	2	6	4	0	0–0	
John Pontifex	England	Middlesex	1806	1806	2	32	16	0	0–0	
Arthur Upton	Ireland	MCC	1806	1806	2	20	11	0	0–0	
Charles Warren	England	Hampshire	1806	1806	1	2	2*	0	0–0	
John Willes	England	Kent	1806	1806	2	7	5	3	1–?	
John Brand	England	MCC	1819	1825	5	72	19	0	0–0	
Samuel Cockerill	England	MCC	1819	1819	1	29	24	0	0–0	
Algernon Greville	England	MCC	1819	1819	1	12	12*	0	0–0	
Charles Greville	England	MCC	1819	1827	2	43	36	0	0–0	
Henry Lowther	England	MCC	1819	1820	2	9	6	7	0–0	
John Mills	England	Hampshire	1819	1819	1	3	2*	0	0–0	
George Parry	England	MCC	1819	1829	3	55	30	0	0–0	
Daniel Stacey	England	MCC	1819	1819	1	10	10	0	0–0	
William Ward	England	MCC	1819	1838	18	570	102*	2	1–?	
Thomas Bache	England	MCC	1820	1822	2	16	15	0	0–0	
Thomas Howard	England	Hampshire	1820	1820	1	37	26	5	4–?	
Henry T. Lane	England	MCC	1820	1827	2	6	3*	0	0–0	
Richard Lane	England	MCC	1820	1822	2	30	25	0	0–0	
Henry J. Lloyd	England	MCC	1820	1830	9	99	37	0	0–0	
Thomas Vigne	England	MCC	1820	1830	5	26	11	0	0–0	
C. J. Barnett	England	MCC	1821	1827	7	43	19*	0	0–0	
J. E. G. Bayley	England	MCC	1821	1821	1	1	1*	0	0–0	
William Deedes	England	MCC	1821	1825	4	33	16	5	3–?	
Thomas Nicoll	England	MCC	1821	1824	4	32	16	0	0–0	
John Tanner	England	MCC	1821	1821	1	5	5	0	0–0	
James Townsend	England	MCC	1821	1831	4	36	12	0	0–0	
John Barnard	England	MCC	1822	1829	3	7	3	0	0–0	
Francis Nicholas	England	MCC	1823	1827	5	100	51	9	3–?	
William Sewell	England	MCC	1823	1827	4	74	32	0	0–0	
James Grinham	England	Godalming	1824	1824	1	3	3	0	0–0	
William Keen	England	Surrey	1824	1830	3	84	45	0	0–0	
John Otway	England	Gentlemen	1824	1825	2	25	13*	0	0–0	
William Otway	England	Gentlemen	1824	1825	2	4	3	0	0–0	
– Roberts	England	Hampshire	1824	1824	1	18	14	1	1–?	
James de Visme	England	Gentlemen	1825	1825	1	2	1	0	0–0	
W. C. Dyer	England	MCC	1825	1825	1	15	8	0	0–0	
Henry Kingscote	England	MCC	1825	1834	8	172	38	0	0–0	
Edward Knight	England	Kent	1825	1827	3	54	24	0	0–0	
William Mathews	England	Godalming	1825	1825	1	27	24	8	7–?	
John Willan	England	Hampshire	1825	1825	1	4	4*	0	0–0	
Lord Strathavon	England	MCC	1827	1827	1	4	4	0	0–0	
– Batt	England	Gentlemen	1827	1827	1	1	1	1	1–?	
John Deedes	England	Kent	1827	1829	3	22	8	0	0–0	
Percyvall Dyke	England	Kent	1827	1833	3	64	19	2	2–?	
Henry Everett	England	MCC	1827	1827	1	12	8*	0	0–0	
Francis Gordon	England	MCC	1827	1827	1	3	3	1	1–?	
Herbert Jenner	England	Kent	1827	1836	9	132	32	8	3–?	
Henry Knatchbull	England	Kent	1827	1839	6	60	25	0	0–0	
George T. Knight	England	Kent	1827	1837	5	85	20	7	3–?	
Henry Norman	England	Kent	1827	1833	4	29	7	0	0–0	
Charles Rocke	England	Kent	1827	1827	2	19	16	0	0–0	
Edward Romilly	England	MCC	1827	1827	1	17	11	0	0–0	
Jem Broadbridge	England	Sussex	1829	1829	1	43	33	5	3–?	
William Lillywhite	England	Sussex	1829	1830	2	0	0*	20	8–?	
William Potter	England	Surrey	1829	1830	2	7	7	0	0–0	
Fuller Pilch	England	Kent	1830	1838	2	24	21	3	2–?	
Nicholas Felix	England	Kent	1831	1852	19	400	88	0	0–0	
Charles Harenc	England	Kent	1831	1838	7	49	16	7	3–?	
F. H. Hervey-Bathurst	England	MCC	1831	1854	20	143	28	73	7–?	
John Michell	England	Gentlemen	1831	1831	1	21	12	0	0–0	
Henry Wodehouse	England	MCC	1831	1833	2	10	6*	0	0–0	
George Betts	England	Kent	1832	1832	1	0	0*	1	1–?	
William Borradaile	England	MCC	1832	1832	1	0	0	0	0–0	
St Vincent Cotton	England	MCC	1832	1835	2	22	8	0	0–0	
R. W. Keate	England	MCC	1832	1837	3	18	10	0	0–0	
Alfred Mynn	England	Kent	1832	1852	21	605	66	107	8–?	
Lord Clonbrock	Ireland	MCC	1833	1833	1	4	4	0	0–0	
Charles Ellis	England	MCC	1833	1833	1	3	3	0	0–0	
Roger Kynaston	England	MCC	1833	1845	10	141	34	0	0–0	
Walter Mynn	England	Kent	1833	1846	7	99	20	0	0–0	
Charles Romilly	England	MCC	1833	1833	1	3	2	0	0–0	
J. Smith	England	Gentlemen	1833	1833	1	5	4	0	0–0	
William Strahan	England	MCC	1833	1835	2	20	10	0	0–0	
Edward Ellis	England	CUCC	1834	1834	1	2	1	1	1–?	
Charles Parnther	England	MCC	1834	1836	3	42	26	2	1–?	
Hayter Reed	England	MCC	1834	1834	1	8	8	0	0–0	
Henry Walker	England	MCC	1834	1836	2	3	2	0	0–0	
Charles Wilkinson	England	CUCC	1834	1834	1	4	4	0	0–0	
James Cobbett	England	MCC	1835	1838	2	27	23	14	6–?	
Sam Redgate	England	Nottingham	1835	1835	1	6	6	3	2–?	
Henry Snow	England	MCC	1835	1835	1	26	24	0	0–0	
C. Beecham	England	Gentlemen	1836	1836	1	0	0*	0	0–0	
William Brown	England	MCC	1836	1836	1	0	0	0	0–0	
William Buller	England	MCC	1836	1836	1	5	5	0	0–0	
Nicholas Darnell	England	OUCC	1836	1836	1	0	0	0	0–0	
Edward Grimston	England	MCC	1836	1839	4	24	13	0	0–0	
James Grimston	England	MCC	1836	1839	2	52	21	0	0–0	
Alfred Lowth	England	OUCC	1836	1841	2	14	8	14	5–?	
William Pakenham	England	Gentlemen	1836	1836	1	0	0	0	0–0	
Edward Pickering	England	MCC	1836	1844	2	52	20*	0	0–0	
Frederick Pigou	England	MCC	1836	1836	1	3	3	0	0–0	
F. G. B. Ponsonby	England	MCC	1836	1845	8	113	23	0	0–0	
John Strange	England	MCC	1836	1838	2	23	14	6	4–?	
Charles Taylor	England	Sussex	1836	1846	12	290	89	29	5–46	
Charles Beauclerk	England	MCC	1837	1837	1	9	9	0	0–0	
Algernon Coote	Ireland	OUCC	1837	1837	1	8	7*	0	0–0	
Thomas Craven	England	Middlesex	1837	1843	2	3	2	5	5–?	
Alfred Jackson	England	Gentlemen	1837	1837	1	0	0	0	0–0	
John Kirwan	Wales	CUCC	1837	1837	1	2	1	4	4–?	
Thomas Lewis	England	Surrey	1837	1837	1	0	0	0	0–0	
William Meyrick	Wales	MCC	1837	1837	1	0	0	0	0–0	
Richard Nicholson	England	MCC	1837	1837	1	2	2	0	0–0	
George Plank	England	Gentlemen	1837	1837	1	28	21	0	0–0	
Charles Whyting	England	Surrey	1837	1837	1	3	3*	0	0–0	
George Whyting	England	Surrey	1837	1837	1	12	12	0	0–0	
Ned Wenman	England	Kent	1838	1838	1	13	7	0	0–0	
Edward Sayres	England	MCC	1839	1840	2	0	0	2	2–?	
Charles Whittaker	England	Kent	1839	1845	5	60	9*	4	3–?	
Thomas Anson	England	MCC	1840	1845	6	92	17*	0	0–0	
Henry Hand	England	CUCC	1840	1840	1	5	4	0	0–0	
Edwin Napper	England	Sussex County Cricket Club	1840	1858	8	135	33	4	3–18	

== See also ==
- List of Gentlemen v Players matches
- List of Gentlemen cricketers (1841–1962)
- List of Players cricketers (1806–1840)
- List of Players cricketers (1841–1962)
