= William Jefferies =

English cricketer (1777–?)

Personal information
- Born: 1777; Nottingham
- Died: unknown
- Role: Batsman

Domestic team information
- Years: Team
- 1800–1818: Nottingham Cricket Club

William Jefferies (christened 1 July 1777 in Nottingham; date of death unknown) was an English professional cricketer. He was a batsman, but it is not known if he was right- or left-handed. References to him have been found from 1800 to 1818, playing in historically important matches for Nottingham Cricket Club. (Note: Any match listed in the ACS' Important Match Guide (1981) is historically important, and therefore of the highest standard, whether or not a scorecard might exist. The same applies to numerous matches discovered by researchers since 1981. For further information, see First-class cricket.) (Note: Scorecard data till at least 1825 was never comprehensive, especially the dismissal information: bowling analyses lacked balls bowled and runs conceded; bowlers were not credited with wickets when the batsman was caught or stumped; in many matches, the means of dismissal were omitted.)

== Career ==
=== 1800 season ===
Jefferies is first recorded in Nottingham's match against Leicester on 25 August 1800. The match was at an unspecified venue in Leicester, and Nottingham won by an innings and 38 runs after dismissing Leicester for totals of 15 and 8. Nottingham were all out for 61 in their innings. Jefferies was number 9 in the batting order, and was run out for 3. He did not take any wickets or catches. Arthur Haygarth commented that Leicester's match total of 23 was the lowest in his experience.

Five weeks later, on 29 September, Jefferies played against Sheffield at Mansfield. He batted at number 10 and scored 1 run in each innings. Nottingham scored 67 and 102, against 24 and 22, by Sheffield to win by 123 runs. Haygarth says this was the first recorded match between Nottingham and Sheffield, but later research has discovered that they played each other as early as 1771. Both of the 1800 matches are included in the ACS' 'Important Matches' guide.

=== 1801–1803 ===
Jefferies is recorded in one minor match for Nottingham in 1801. Scores & Biographies has no record of him in 1802.

In 1803, he played at Lord's for a combined Nottinghamshire & Leicestershire (N&L) team against Hampshire. N&L, with Lord Frederick Beauclerk as a guest player, were all out for 116; Hampshire replied with 253, a first innings lead of 137. N&L were then dismissed for 117, so Hampshire won by an innings and 20 runs. But for Beauclerk, who scored 34 and 74, the defeat would have been much worse. Jefferies batted at number 8, scoring 4 and 2. This match is also in the ACS guide.

== 1814–1818 ==
There is no further mention of Jefferies until 1814 when he played for Nottingham against Rutlandshire at Burley Park on 20 September. Rutlandshire batted first and were all out for 35. Jefferies completed one catch to take the ninth wicket. Nottingham scored 228 in reply and Jefferies, batting at number 8, top-scored with 67. The number 10 batsman, William Leeson, scored 65. Rutlandshire were all out for 30 in their second innings so Nottingham won by an innings and 163 runs. Cricket had been seriously disrupted by the Napoleonic Wars. Only a year earlier, when reporting on a match for the first time in three years, the Nottingham Review had commented that the sport was thought to have "fallen into disuse, if not disgrace".

Jefferies is mentioned once in 1815 when he played in a minor match on 4 October against a village team who were allowed sixteen players. Nottingham still won by 4 wickets. Jefferies made two low scores and held one catch. Nottingham travelled to Knavesmire in July 1816 for a 12-a-side match against the Ripon club. The team included R. Jefferies, who scored 41 in his only innings—it is not known if this player was related to William Jefferies. Nottingham won by an innings and 108 runs.

In June 1817, Nottingham entertained an England XI on the Forest Ground. The visitors had a very strong team including Beauclerk, Billy Beldham, E. H. Budd, Thomas Howard, William Lambert, and George Osbaldeston. Nottingham were allowed 22 players in the most extreme form of "odds match". Both of the Jefferies played. William Jefferies scored 2 and 5; he also took a catch to dismiss Budd for only 4. The Nottingham XXII won by 30 runs, but the match became the cause of a major scandal. It was later alleged that both sides had agreed with gambling interests to fix the result. Beauclerk used this as an excuse to have his enemies Lambert and Osbaldeston banned from playing at Lord's.

The final mention of William Jefferies is in a repeat of the Nottingham XXII v England match on 7 September 1818. This was again played on the Forest Ground. Jefferies scored 6 in the first innings, but did not bat in the second as Nottingham won by 14 wickets. Haygarth commented on the weakness of the England team which included four unknown players.

== Bibliography ==
- ACS (1981). A Guide to Important Cricket Matches Played in the British Isles 1709–1863. Nottingham: ACS. OCLC 85045528.
- Birley, Derek (1999). A Social History of English Cricket. London: Aurum Press. ISBN 978-18-54107-10-7 – via Internet Archive.
- Buckley, G. B. (1935). Fresh Light on 18th Century Cricket. Birmingham: Cotterell & Co. OCLC 23450280.
- Haygarth, Arthur (1996) [1862]. Scores & Biographies, Volume 1 (1744–1826). Kennington: Frederick Lillywhite. ISBN 978-19-00592-23-9.
- Haygarth, Arthur (1997) [1862]. Scores & Biographies, Volume 2 (1827–1840). Kennington: Frederick Lillywhite. ISBN 978-19-00592-23-9.
- Major, John (2007). More Than A Game. London: HarperCollins. ISBN 978-00-07183-64-7 – via Internet Archive.
- Webber, Roy (1951). The Playfair Book of Cricket Records. London: Playfair Books Ltd. OCLC 753176177.
