= Repton (disambiguation) =

Repton may refer to:

== Places ==
=== In England ===
- Repton, a parish and village in Derbyshire
  - Repton Abbey, a former Benedictine Abbey
  - Repton Priory, a former Augustinian Priory
  - Repton Rural District, a rural district in Derbyshire from 1894 to 1974
  - Repton School
  - Repton School Ground, a cricket ground
- Repton Prep, a co-educational private school in Foremark, Derbyshire

=== In the United States ===
- Repton (Louisville, Kentucky), a historic house listed on the National Register of Historic Places
- Repton, Alabama, a town in the United States

=== Elsewhere ===
- Repton School Dubai, a boarding school in Dubai
- Repton, New South Wales, a town in New South Wales, Australia

== People ==
- Humphry Repton (1752–1818), landscape gardener
- Humphrey Repton (cricketer) (c. 1780–1819), English cricketer

== Other uses ==
- Repton, a tune in Hubert Parry's 1888 oratorio Judith, adopted at Repton School for the hymn "Dear Lord and Father of Mankind"
- Repton, a character from the Cartoon Network series Storm Hawks
- Repton, a single entangled monomer in a system undergoing reptation
- Repton, a preserved British SR V class steam locomotive
- Repton (video game), the first in series of maze solving computer games by Superior Software
- Repton (1983 video game), a computer game by Sirius Software
- Repton Boxing Club, a boxing club in east London
- Reptons Coaches, bus service operator in Surrey.
