= Samuel Hedderley =

English cricketer

Samuel Hedderley (dates unknown) was an English professional cricketer who made four known appearances for Nottingham Cricket Club in historically important matches between 1789 and 1791.

== Matches ==
Hedderley is first recorded on 21 September 1789, when he opened the innings for Nottingham in a match against Leicester, which was played in Loughborough. He scored 21 runs, the highest score in the match, and that helped Nottingham to earn an innings victory, by an innings and 16 runs. Arthur Haygarth commented on the venue, Loughborough, "as being equi-distant between the two towns".

The teams met again that year, also in Loughborough, on 5 October. This match was interrupted for several days by a dispute about the follow-on rule. Leicester had batted first and scored 63 all out. Nottingham replied with 39 all out; Hedderley again opened the innings but was bowled without scoring. At this point, Leicester argued that Nottingham should follow-on as they were behind on first innings. Nottingham objected, and the dispute caused the match to be postponed by several days until it was agreed that the Laws of Cricket did not require a follow-on. Leicester scored 32 in their second innings, Hedderley holding one catch. Needing 57 to win, Nottingham were all out for 55—Hedderley scoring 3—and lost by one run. The match was called "the odd notch match".

Hedderley is next recorded in August 1791 when he played in two matches against Marylebone Cricket Club (MCC), both on King's Meadow, Nottingham. MCC's team was an all-amateur unit, but it was quite strong as it was led by George Finch, 9th Earl of Winchilsea, and included noted players such as Charles Anguish, Charles Cumberland, Colonel Charles Lennox, and George Louch. The first match was played 29 and 30 August. Nottingham batted first with Hedderley fourth in the order. He made their top score of 19 in a total of 63 all out. Haygarth noted that, in one of his sources, "Hedderley was spelt Adderley". MCC responded with 125 for a first innings lead of 62. Nottingham in their second innings could only score 62 (Hedderley was caught by Lennox for 1), and MCC won the match by 10 wickets. The second match was played immediately after the first one was completed. Nottingham had to play at odds with extra players, to give MCC a handicap. Hedderley scored 3 and 2. Despite the handicap, MCC won convincingly enough by 21 runs. Their standout player was bowler Thomas Lord, founder of Lord's.

== Personal life ==
Hedderley traded as a butcher on Long Row in the centre of Nottingham. His wife Ann (née Pilkington) continued to run the business after he died (date unknown) at the age of 54. They had a son called James, who was born in about 1798. James became landlord of The Greyhound, a Nottingham pub.

== Bibliography ==
- Haygarth, Arthur (1996) [1862]. Scores & Biographies, Volume 1 (1744–1826). Kennington: Frederick Lillywhite. ISBN 978-19-00592-23-9.
