= Richard Stringer =

English cricketer

Richard Stringer (born 15 March 1772; date of death unknown) was an English professional cricketer from Leicester. He made several known appearances from 1789 to 1803 in historically important matches. (Note: Any match listed in the ACS' Important Match Guide (1981) is historically important, and therefore of the highest standard, whether or not a scorecard might exist. The same applies to numerous matches discovered by researchers since 1981. For further information, see First-class cricket.)

== Career ==
Stringer played mostly for Leicestershire & Rutland, and he was a member of the combined Nottinghamshire & Leicestershire team at Lord's in July 1803.

== Bibliography ==
- ACS (1981). A Guide to Important Cricket Matches Played in the British Isles 1709–1863. Nottingham: ACS. OCLC 85045528.
- Haygarth, Arthur (1996) [1862]. Scores & Biographies, Volume 1 (1744–1826). Kennington: Frederick Lillywhite. ISBN 978-19-00592-23-9.
