= Charles Whyting =

English cricketer

Personal information
- Full name: Charles Henry Whyting
- Born: 1812; England
- Died: 23 April 1866 (aged 53/54); Walworth, Surrey, England
- Batting: Unknown
- Relatives: George Whyting (brother)

Domestic team information
- Years: Team
- 1839: Surrey

Career statistics
Competition	First-class
Matches	1
Runs scored	17
Batting average	17.00
100s/50s	–/–
Top score	14*
Catches/stumpings	1/–
- Source: Cricinfo, 1 January 2014

Charles Henry Whyting (1812 – 23 April 1866) was an English cricketer. Whyting's batting style is unknown.

Whyting made his debut in first-class cricket when he was selected to play for the Gentlemen in the Gentlemen v Players fixture of 1837 at Lord's. He made a second appearance in first-class cricket in 1839 at Lord's for Surrey against the Marylebone Cricket Club. He scored a total of 17 runs in his two matches, with a highest score of 14 not out.

He died at Walworth, Surrey on 23 April 1866. His brother George Whyting was also a first-class cricketer.
