= Burley House =

Grade I listed house in Rutland, England

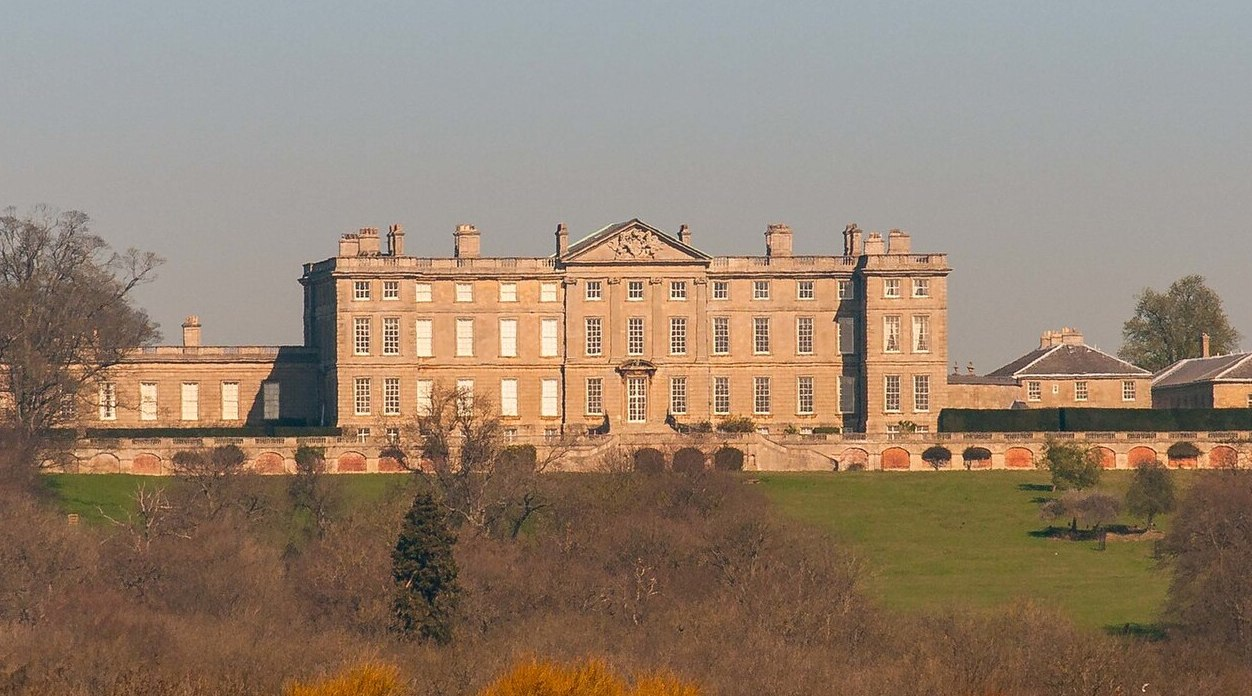

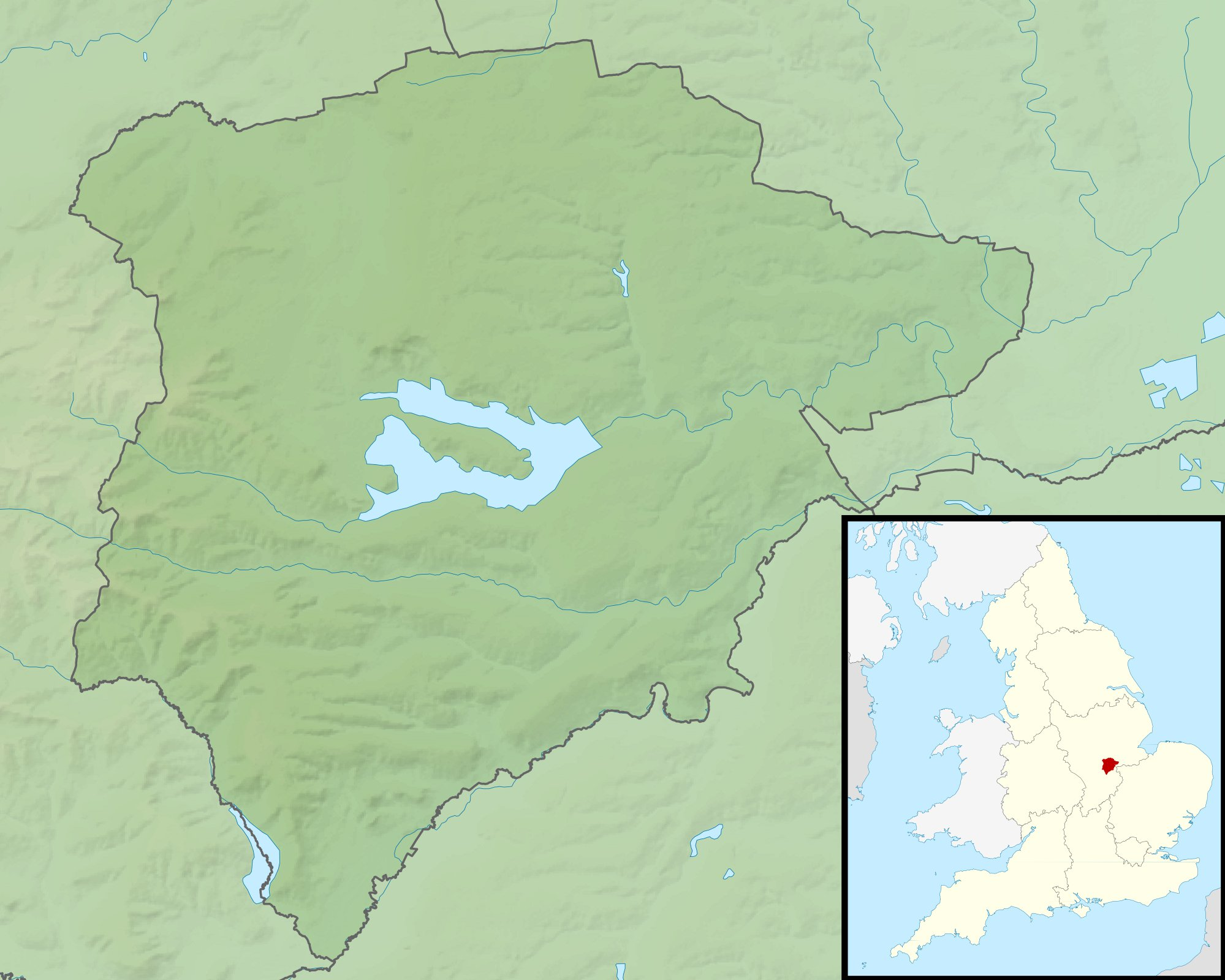
- Location within Rutland
- 52.6822°N 0.6938°W
- Type: House
- Location: Burley, Rutland

History
- Built: c.1696-1700

Site notes
- Architect: Daniel Finch, 2nd Earl of Nottingham
- Architectural styles: "Baroque in composition, Palladian in detail"
- Owner: Private

Listed Building – Grade I
- Official name: Burley House
- Designated: 18 September 1984
- Reference no.: 1073792

Listed Building – Grade II*
- Official name: Terrace parapet, retaining wall and staircase
- Designated: 18 September 1984
- Reference no.: 1073793

Listed Building – Grade II*
- Official name: Entrance Gates and Gate Piers
- Designated: 18 September 1984
- Reference no.: 1177480

Listed Building – Grade II
- Official name: Walling to western stable yard and entrance court
- Designated: 18 September 1984
- Reference no.: 1361520

Burley House, Burley-on-the-Hill, Rutland, England is a 17th-century country house built for Daniel Finch, 2nd Earl of Nottingham. Although Finch sought advice on the house from such as Christopher Wren, he appears to have acted as his own architect. The house stands on the site of an earlier building, owned by George Villiers, 1st Duke of Buckingham in the early 17th century. The scale of Finch's new house is vast, the main block, the corps de logis, is fifteen bays long by seven wide, and fronts an expansive cour d'honneur. Construction took place between 1696 and 1700. Much of the interior of the house was destroyed in a major fire in 1908, although subsequently restored. In the late 20th century the house was converted to apartments, with enabling development in the grounds, by Kit Martin. Burley House is a Grade I listed building. Its park is listed at Grade II on the Register of Historic Parks and Gardens of Special Historic Interest in England. Within the estate is a notable early cricket ground, the Park, laid out in the late 18th century by George Finch, 9th Earl of Winchilsea.

== History ==
A Jacobean house on the site was in the possession of John Harington, 1st Baron Harington of Exton. King James VI and I came to Burley on 23 April 1603. Harrington commissioned Samuel Daniel to wrote a poem, the Panegyrike Congratulatorie, for the royal welcome. John Harrington's daughter, Lucy Russell, Countess of Bedford, sold the manor to George Villiers, 1st Duke of Buckingham (1592-1628) in around 1620. When King James came to Burley in August 1621, he was entertained by plays and masques. When the king returned for a wedding in October 1621, the festivities included a performance of Ben Jonson's Masque of Gypsies. The house is said to have been the venue for a banquet for Charles I and Henrietta Maria in 1626, when Jeffrey Hudson, the Rutland Dwarf, was produced from a pie. (Note: Other sources suggest that the banquet at which Hudson was presented was held in London. Hudson's subsequent life was eventful; fleeing to France during the Civil War, he was captured by Barbary pirates on his attempted return. He died in poverty in 1682.)

The house was destroyed in the Civil War. George Villiers, 2nd Duke of Buckingham sold the estate to Daniel Finch, 2nd Earl of Nottingham (1647-1730) in the 1670s. The early Finchs were lawyers, Finch's father, Heneage having served as Lord Chancellor under Charles II. Finch later determined to construct a new house on the site. Elizabeth Williamson, in her Leicestershire and Rutland volume in the Buildings of England series gives the build dates for the new house as between 1696 and 1700. Historic England suggests a slightly later completion date of 1705.

While Finch consulted widely on the design, including seeking advice from Christopher Wren, and employed a number of known builders, including Henry Dormer and John Lumley, (Note: Howard Colvin's Biographical Dictionary of British Architects: 1600-1840 has entries for both Henry Dormer and John Lumley. Of Dormer, he writes; "an architect and land surveyor... employed by the second Earl of Nottingham to supervise the rebuilding of Burley-On-The-Hill, Rutland, but his share (if any) in the design is uncertain". Of Lumley; "a surveyor and master mason, [he] took the place of Henry Dormer as the surveyor employed by the 2nd Earl of Nottingham to supervise the building of his mansion at Burley-On-The-Hill... the main features of the design had already been determined by the time Lumley took charge... some of the architectural details may have been determined by him".) he appears to have acted as his own architect. (Note: Pearl Finch, in her history of her family published in 1901, suggested that Finch was inspired by the architecture of Italy, which he had seen on his Grand Tour, undertaken in the 1660s. Elizabeth Williamson gives credence to this suggestion, noting, as did Finch, the similarities between the colonnades of the cour d'honneur at Burley with those of St. Peter's Square in Rome: "the colonnades of St Peter's, then in progress, seem to have made a fruitful impression".) Historic England describes Finch's design as "Baroque in composition" and it consists of a large central block with adjoining wings that flank an entrance court. Finch incorporated the stables from Buckingham's house which had survived the civil war into the east wing. (Note: The Duke of Buckingham's stables at Burley were famed for their grandeur: Thomas Fuller described them in his Worthies of England, published in 1662; "[Burley] was inferior to few for the House, Superior to all for the Stable, where horses (if their pabulum were so plenty as their Stabulum stately) were the best accommodated in England".) The southern, garden, frontage now looks out over Rutland Water. In 1795 the 9th Earl engaged Humphry Repton to remodel the grounds. Repton produced one of his celebrated Red Books showing the potential for development, but not all of his ideas were taken forward.

On 6 August 1908 a fire broke out at the house, resulting in the destruction of many of the interiors and much of the contents, including some books dating to the Elizabethan period. At the time the house was let to Freddie Guest, a cousin of the future prime minister Winston Churchill, who was staying at Burley when the fire occurred. Churchill helped to try to extinguish it, though ineffectually. (Note: Churchill described the fire in a letter to his fiancée, Clementine Hozier, dated 7 August 1908, the day after the incident: "The fire was great fun and we all enjoyed it thoroughly. It is a [very] strange thing to be locked in deadly grapple with that cruel element. I had no conception of the power and majesty of a great conflagration. Whole rooms sprang into flame as if by enchantment. Chairs and tables burnt up like matches. Floors collapsed and ceilings crashed down. Every window spouted fire, and from the centre of the house a volcano roared skyward. The Guests have no responsibility and the Finches are I hear well-insured. It is only the archives that must be mourned inconsolably".) The Finches held on to the estate into the late 20th century, the house passing by descent to the Hanbury family, until it was sold in the 1980s to Asil Nadir. After Nadir's flight to Northern Cyprus following charges of fraud, the estate was bought by Kit Martin, who converted the house into separate dwellings and undertook enabling development in the grounds. Burley remains privately owned and is not open to the public.

== Architecture and description ==
Williamson notes that "the site and scale are impressive". Historic England describe Finch’s style as “Baroque in composition, Palladian in detail”. The house consists of a main block, the corps de logis, which is fifteen bays long by seven wide. This is of three storeys over a basement. It is surmounted by pediments with, at the centre, Nottingham's coat of arms supported on four Corinthian columns. The building material is brick, faced with limestone quarried at Clipsham in the north of the county. The main floor, the piano nobile, is raised on a wide terrace. To the north, the entrance front is partially enclosed as a cour d'honneur by two flanking wings and a colonnade with Tuscan columns that concludes with the western and eastern stables.

Much of the original interior was destroyed in the fire of 1908. Restoration was undertaken by John Coleridge in the early 20th century in an imitation 17th-century style. Some original work remains, including mural decoration by Gerard Lanscroon in the Staircase Hall.

Burley House is a Grade I listed building. The terrace and the entrance gateway to the cour d'honneur are both listed at Grade II*. The park is listed at Grade II on the Register of Historic Parks and Gardens of Special Historic Interest in England. (Note: The grounds contained a folly, the Sanctuary of the Hermit Finch, designed in 1807. This was destroyed by fire in 1965.)

== The Park ==
George Finch, 9th Earl of Winchilsea succeeded to the title in 1769, and inherited the Burley House estate. After his British Army career ended in 1783, he became a prolific cricketer, and "would go anywhere for a game". Within the grounds of Burley House, Winchilsea laid out a cricket field which became known as The Park. It was first used for an historically important match in 1790.

The first match was played 19/21 July 1790 between England and Hampshire. Hampshire, who had four given men—James Aylward, Stephen Butcher, Robert Clifford, and Joey Ring—won by 7 wickets. The fixture was repeated the following year, and England won by 54 runs, largely thanks to an innings of 63 by Billy Beldham in what was otherwise a low-scoring match. Also in 1791, MCC defeated the Old Etonians by 6 wickets, and then Leicestershire and Rutland by an innings and 41 runs. In the second match, Charles Cumberland scored 61*, and took at least eleven (all bowled) wickets.

There were three matches in 1792, including Hampshire v England, which the county team won by 75 runs. In 1793, England defeated Surrey by 7 wickets. The final big match held on the ground was in August of the same year when the Earl of Winchilsea's XI defeated R. Leigh's XI by 5 wickets.

The last recorded match, before the 20th century, was in 1814 when Rutland played Nottingham. The grounds of the mansion have been used for occasional cricket matches in recent decades, including one between a Lord's Taverners XV and a Rutland XI in 1994, which marked 300 years since the house was constructed; the Taverners won by 3 wickets.

== See also ==
- Holy Cross Church, Burley

== Bibliography ==
- Churchill, Randolph (1969). Companion Volume, 1907 – 1911. Authorised biography of Winston S. Churchill. Vol. II Part 2. London: Heinemann. OCLC 1070167856.
- Colvin, Howard (1978). A Biographical Dictionary of British Architects. London: John Murray. OCLC 757798516.
- Finch, Pearl (1901). History of Burley-On-The-Hill, Rutland (PDF). London: John Bale, Sons & Danielsson Ltd. OCLC 1978473.
- Haygarth, Arthur (1996) [1862]. Scores & Biographies, Volume 1 (1744–1826). Kennington: Frederick Lillywhite. ISBN 978-19-00592-23-9.
- Pevsner, Nikolaus; Williamson, Elizabeth (2003). Leicestershire and Rutland. The Buildings of England. New Haven, US and London: Yale University Press. ISBN 978-0-300-09618-7. OCLC 49298894.
- Snow, E. E. (1989). The Country House Cricket Grounds of Leicestershire and Rutland. Nottingham: ACS. ISBN 978-19-02171-09-8.
- Thomson, A. A. (1985). Odd Men In: A Gallery of Cricket Eccentrics. Shoreham-by-Sea: The Pavilion Library. ISBN 978-09-07516-73-6.
- Waites, Bryan; Stevens Curl, James (1990). "Heritage on the Hill" (PDF). Rutland Record: The Journal of the Rutland Record Society. 10.
