= W. C. Dyer =

English cricketer

W. C. Dyer (dates unknown) was an English amateur cricketer who is known to have played from 1820 to 1825. He was mainly associated with Marylebone Cricket Club (MCC). He made several known appearances in historically important matches, (Note: Any match listed in the ACS' Important Match Guide (1981) is historically important, and therefore of the highest standard, whether or not a scorecard might exist. The same applies to numerous matches discovered by researchers since 1981. For further information, see First-class cricket.) including one for the Players in 1821, and another for the Gentlemen in 1825.

== Career ==
=== 1820 ===
Nothing is known of Dyer's early life, and he is first recorded in cricket sources playing for Mitcham against Marylebone Cricket Club (MCC) at Lord's on 31 July and 1 August 1820. As he was an MCC member, he presumably played for Mitcham as a given man. Dyer made scores of 4 and 10 in his two innings, being caught in both. He also held two catches himself, to dismiss John Brand and George Parry. The match was a close contest. MCC batted first, scoring 121, and Mitcham replied with 133. MCC scored 103 in their second innings, leaving Mitcham with a target of 92 to win. They were all out for 89, so MCC won by 2 runs.

=== Hampshire v MCC, 1821 ===
Dyer's next known match was for Hampshire against MCC at Lord's from 16 to 18 July 1821. MCC won by 191 runs after scoring 177 and 237 against Hampshire's 105 and 118. Dyer scored 0 in the first innings, 10 in the second, and held one catch to dismiss John Sparks.

=== Gentlemen v Players, 1821 ===
A few days later, on 23 and 24 July, Dyer took part in the Gentlemen v Players match at Lord's. Although he was an amateur player, he was in the Players team. Arthur Haygarth says "he backed them", and it seems that he appointed himself as their captain. Haygarth added that "Such an arrangement would not now (in 1862) be tolerated". The Gentlemen batted first, and were soon all out for 60. The Players began their first innings with a good opening partnership between John Sparks (who scored 63) and John Thumwood (29). Dyer was fourth in the batting order, and scored 16 before he was caught by Beauclerk. Several of the Players reached double figures, and the outstanding innings was by Thomas Beagley, whose 113* was the fixture's first century.

The match had been arranged to celebrate the Coronation of George IV a few days earlier, and it came to be known as the "Coronation Match". The Players batted for several hours on both the 23rd and 24th until they reached 270 for 6, with Beagley on 113 and Billy Beldham, who was both 55 years old and suffering a leg injury, on 23. At that point, Beauclerk and his team "gave up", and so the Players won on a very dubious concession. Derek Birley said that, as the match was celebrating the accession of George IV, "it was a suitably murky affair".

== Bibliography ==
- ACS (1981). A Guide to Important Cricket Matches Played in the British Isles 1709–1863. Nottingham: ACS. OCLC 85045528.
- Birley, Derek (1999). A Social History of English Cricket. London: Aurum Press. ISBN 978-18-54107-10-7 – via Internet Archive.
- Haygarth, Arthur (1996) [1862]. Scores & Biographies, Volume 1 (1744–1826). Kennington: Frederick Lillywhite. ISBN 978-19-00592-23-9.
