= William Hooker (cricketer) =

English cricketer

William Hooker (born 17 May 1796 at Midhurst, Sussex; died 27 December 1867 at Midhurst, Sussex) was an English professional cricketer who played from 1823 to 1833. A right-handed batsman and occasional wicket-keeper, he was mainly associated with Sussex and made 26 known appearances, including 5 for the Players between 1823 and 1830.

== Bibliography ==
- Arthur Haygarth, Scores & Biographies, Volume 1–2 (1744–1840), Lillywhite, 1862
