= Thomas Stevenson (cricketer) =

English cricketer

Personal information
- Born: 6 June 1804; Callan, County Kilkenny, Ireland
- Died: 1845 (aged 40–41); Winchester, Hampshire

Domestic team information
- Years: Team
- 1822: Cambridge University
- Source: CricketArchive, 31 March 2013

Thomas Stevenson (6 June 1804 – 1845) was an English cricketer who played for Cambridge University in one match in 1822, totalling 18 runs with a highest score of 13.

Stevenson was educated at Eton College and Trinity College, Cambridge. After graduating he became a Church of England priest and was rector of St Peter's Church, Chesil, Winchester, 1832–44.

== Bibliography ==
- Haygarth, Arthur (1862). Scores & Biographies, Volume 1 (1744–1826). Lillywhite.
