= George Hollest =

English cricketer

Personal information
- Full name: George Edward Hollest
- Born: 29 November 1793; Frimley, Surrey
- Died: 29 September 1850 (aged 56); Frimley, Surrey

Domestic team information
- Years: Team
- 1821: Cambridge University
- Source: CricketArchive, 31 March 2013

George Edward Hollest (28 November 1793 – 29 September 1850) was an English cricketer who played for Cambridge University in one match in 1821, totalling 1 run with a highest score of 1.

Hollest was educated at Winchester College and Emmanuel College, Cambridge. After Cambridge he became a Church of England priest and was priest in charge of Frimley parish from 1832 until his death. Hollest was killed by a gang of robbers in his home in Frimley, a case that was covered extensively by newspapers at the time and was the catalyst for the founding of Surrey Police. He was shot in his parsonage by a gang of four men who had come to rob him and his family. Four men were tried for Hollest's murder. Two were found guilty and put to death, and the others were cleared due to lack of evidence.

== Bibliography ==
- Haygarth, Arthur (1862). Scores & Biographies, Volume 1 (1744–1826). Lillywhite.
