= Philip Hewett =

English cricketer

Personal information
- Born: 7 December 1799; England
- Died: 15 December 1879 (aged 80); Binstead, Isle of Wight

Domestic team information
- Years: Team
- 1820: Cambridge University
- Source: CricketArchive, 31 March 2013

Philip Hewett (7 September 1799 – 15 December 1879) was an English cricketer who played for Cambridge University in one match in 1820, totalling 2 runs with a highest score of 2.

Hewett was educated at Winchester College and St John's College, Cambridge. After graduating he became a Church of England priest and was rector of Binstead for forty-six years, from 1833 until his death. He is remembered in Holy Cross Church, Binstead, by a stone tablet and a stained-glass window.

== Bibliography ==
- Haygarth, Arthur (1862). Scores & Biographies, Volume 1 (1744–1826). Lillywhite.
