= Richard Martin (cricketer) =

English cricketer

Richard Martin (born 1789 and christened 29 November 1789 at Lancing, Sussex; details of death unknown) was an English cricketer who played in three matches from 1815 to 1816. He was a wicket-keeper mainly associated with Sussex.
