= Burley, Rutland =

Village and civil parish in Rutland, England

Coordinates: 52.68°N 0.70°W

Burley
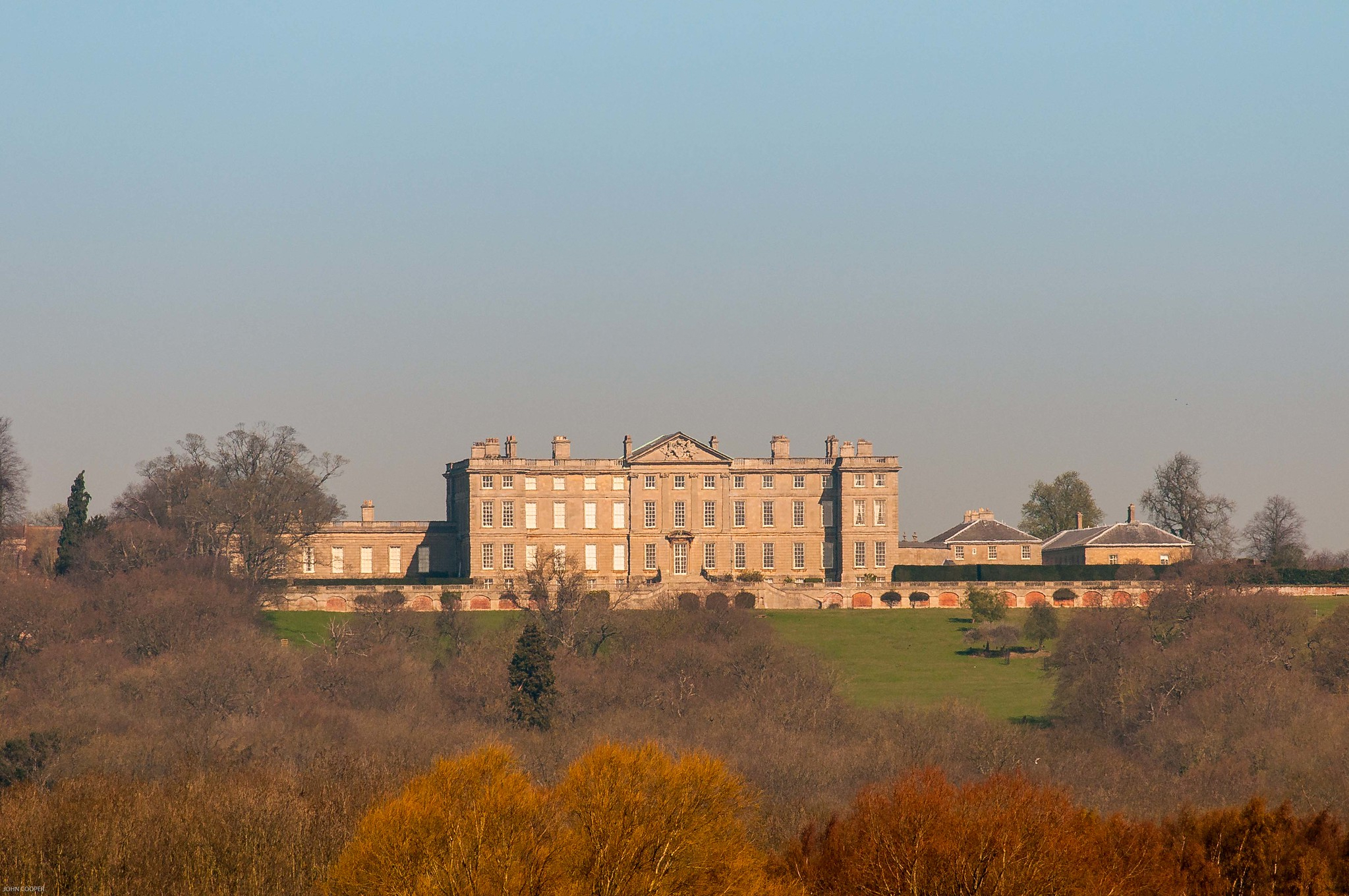
- Burley House

- Location within Rutland
- Area: 4.8 sq mi (12 km^{2})
- Population: 577 2001 census
  - Density: 120/sq mi (46/km^{2})
- OS grid reference: SK882104
  - London: 86 miles (138 km) SSE
- Unitary authority: Rutland
- Shire county: Rutland
- Ceremonial county: Rutland
- Region: East Midlands
- Country: England
- Sovereign state: United Kingdom
- Post town: OAKHAM
- Postcode district: LE15
- Dialling code: 01572
- Police: Leicestershire
- Fire: Leicestershire
- Ambulance: East Midlands
- UK Parliament: Rutland and Stamford

Burley, or Burley-on-the-Hill, is a village and civil parish in the county of Rutland in the East Midlands of England. It is two miles (3 km) north-east of Oakham. The population of the civil parish was 577 at the 2001 census, including Egleton, but reducing to 325 at the 2011 census.

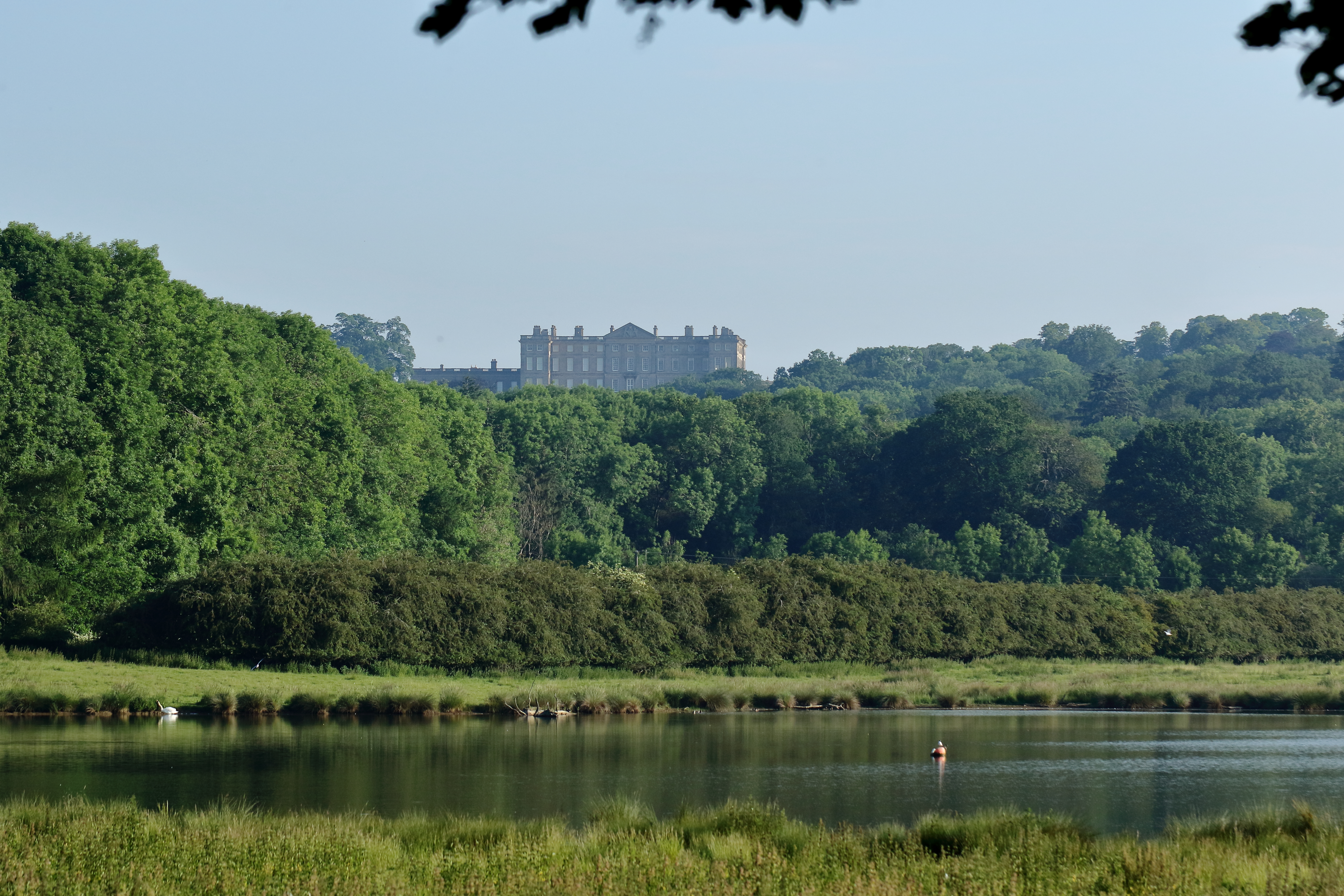
View from Rutland Water

The village's name means "wood/clearing with a fortification".

In the parish, north of the village, is Alstoe, the site of a probable small motte-and-bailey castle, and part of the deserted medieval village of Alsthorpe. Alstoe was the name of a hundred.

In 1379 Sir Thomas le Despenser granted the Burley manor to trustees, two of whom were his brother Henry, Bishop of Norwich and his nephew Hugh le Despenser. Thomas died without issue in 1381, when at the outbreak of the Peasants' Revolt, Henry was at Burley and travelled to Norwich to confront the rebels.

The Old Smithy on the village green was used in advertisements for Cherry Blossom shoe polish in the 1920s.

HM Prison Ashwell was located about one mile (2 km) west of the centre of the village on what was previously the site of a Second World War US Army base, home to part of the 82nd Airborne Division. Ashwell Prison closed in March 2011 and has been redeveloped as Oakham Enterprise Park, a business park for office and light industrial use.

== Burley House ==
Burley House in the village now overlooks Rutland Water. The first house was owned by Sir John Harington of Exton. On New Year's Day 1596 he produced a performance of William Shakespeare’s play Titus Andronicus and a masque written by his brother-in-law Sir Edward Wingfield at Burley. Harington's daughter Lucy Russell, Countess of Bedford sold Burley to George Villiers, 1st Duke of Buckingham in 1620 for £28,000.

Buckingham produced Ben Jonson's masque The Gypsies Metamorphosed at Burley in August 1621 to celebrate his marriage to Katherine Manners. Nicholas Lanier supervised the music. King James and Prince Charles were present. Later in the year, Buckingham requested Scottish fir tree seeds and saplings for the park from the Earl of Mar, and 1624 the Earl of Northumberland sent 1,000 walnut trees.

A new house, designed in the manner associated with Sir Christopher Wren, was built in the 1690s by Daniel Finch, 2nd Earl of Nottingham, 7th Earl of Winchilsea, who was to a large extent his own architect and involved himself in the minutiae of construction, but employed Henry Dormer (died 1727) to supervise its building. Nottingham replaced Dormer with John Lumley in 1697. Before embarking on the project, Lord Nottingham consulted Wren and had measurements taken at Berkeley House and Montagu House in London. The house, in an H-plan, has a pedimented central block and lightly projecting end pavilions, the central house is 200 feet long with fifteen windows. With its symmetrical wings and outbuildings forming a cour d'honneur, and segmental walling linking matching blocks in a larger outer grassed court, it forms one of the most ambitious aristocratic ensembles of the late 17th century.

A dining room was designed for Daniel Finch, 8th Earl of Winchilsea, and installed in 1778.

In 1908 a fire broke out during a party attended by Winston Churchill, destroying the west part of the house.

The mansion was converted into six dwellings by Kit Martin in 1993–98, with a further 22 dwellings on the estate. Previously the estate had been purchased by Asil Nadir in 1991.

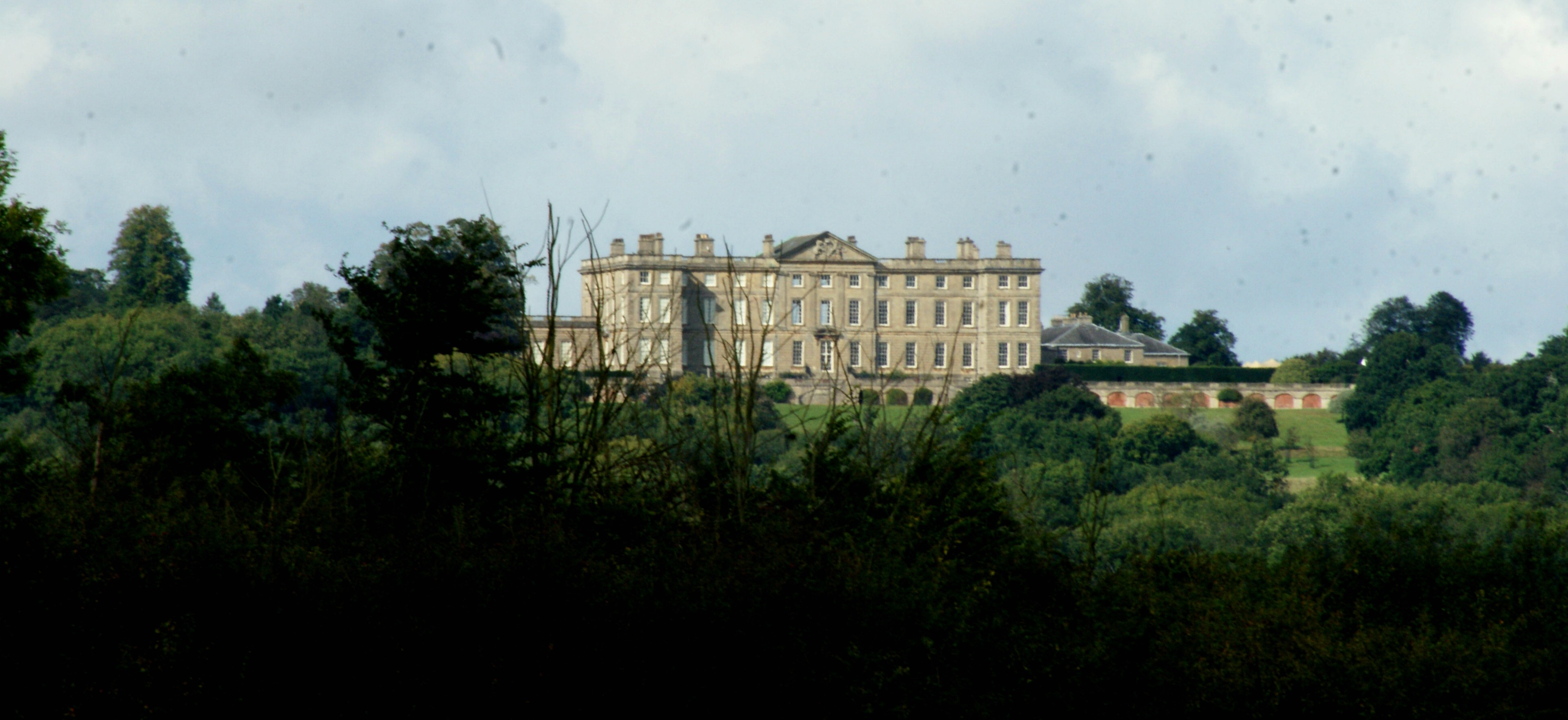
Burley on the Hill close up

== Church ==
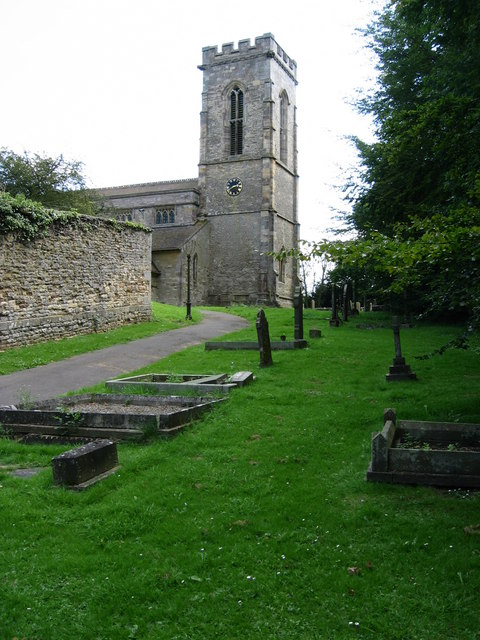
Burley Parish Church

The church of the Holy Cross, adjacent to the mansion, is in the care of the Churches Conservation Trust. It contains a moving memorial by Sir Francis Chantrey to Lady Charlotte Finch (1820).

== 1968 Vulcan crash ==
Avro Vulcan XM604 of 9 Squadron crashed at 13:24 on Tuesday 30 January 1968, 20 yards from the house of Geoffrey Eayrs, due to the failure of an Olympus 301 LP turbine disc on a flight from RAF Cottesmore. The Vulcan was inverted when it crashed and totally disintegrated. The crash was witnessed by resident Colonel Sir Roland Findlay.

It killed four aircrew:

- Flying Officer Barry Donald Goodman of Rickmansworth, a radar operator
- Flight Lieutenant Stephen Roderick Sumpter, of Whetstone, London, navigator
- Flight Lieutenant Michael Joseph Whelan, of Enniscorthy (Republic of Ireland), electronics officer
- Flight Lieutenant Alistir William Bennett, of Muswell Hill, radar instructor

Only Michael Whelan was not married. The wife of Stephen Sumpter had a baby two days before.

Pilot Peter Charles Tait, aged 25, of Farlington, Hampshire near Portsmouth, and co-pilot Michael John Gillett, of the Isle of Man, ejected to safety, because only the two pilots had any ejection seats. The pilot landed near the house, and the co-pilot landed in a ploughed field around half a mile away. The pilot called in at the house, having narrowly missed the house with his four-engined aircraft, and asked the house owner if he could make a telephone call.

The funeral of Michael Whelan took place in Ireland on 5 February, and the funeral of the other three aircrew was on 6 February at St Nicholas' Church, Cottesmore in Rutland.

== Cricket venue ==
George Finch, 9th Earl of Winchilsea, lived at the mansion in the late 18th century and used its grounds to stage a number of cricket matches, six of them first-class, between 1790 and 1793. As late as 1814, the venue was used for a Rutland v Nottingham game.

== Bibliography ==
- Howard Colvin, A Biographical Dictionary of British Architects, 1600–1840, 3rd ed. (Yale University Press) 1995
