= Hayter Reed (cricketer) =

English first-class cricketer & saddler (1800–1881)

Personal information
- Full name: Hayter Thornton Reed
- Born: 1800; Tooting, Surrey, England
- Died: 7 May 1881 (aged 80/81); Blackheath, Kent, England
- Batting: Unknown

Domestic team information
- Years: Team
- 1832–1833: Marylebone Cricket Club

Career statistics
Competition	First-class
Matches	5
Runs scored	24
Batting average	2.66
100s/50s	–/–
Top score	8
Catches/stumpings	1/–
- Source: Cricinfo, 3 August 2020

Hayter Thornton Reed (1800 – 7 May 1881) was an English first-class cricketer and saddler.

Reed was born in 1800 at Tooting, Surrey. He made his debut in first-class cricket for the Marylebone Cricket Club (MCC) against the Gentlemen of Kent in 1832, with Reed making a further three appearances for the MCC in 1833. He was unsuccessful in these matches, scoring 16 runs at an average of 2.00. In 1834, he played for the Gentlemen in the Gentlemen v Players fixture of 1834 at Lord's. By profession Reed was a saddler and a member of the Worshipful Company of Saddlers. Reed died at Blackheath in May 1881, with his wife predeceasing him by three years.
