= Thomas Crimble (cricketer) =

English cricketer

Personal information
- Full name: Thomas Crimble

Domestic team information
- Years: Team
- 1823 & 1825: Hampshire

Career statistics
Competition	FC
Matches	2
Runs scored	99
Batting average	33.00
100s/50s	–/1
Top score	52
Balls bowled	–
Wickets	–
Bowling average	–
5 wickets in innings	–
10 wickets in match	–
Best bowling	–
Catches/stumpings	4/–
- Source: Cricinfo, 2 May 2010

Thomas Crimble (20 March 1798 – 1873) was an English cricketer born in Overton, Hampshire, who represented Hampshire in two matches. The first came in 1823 against an early England team, wherein he scored his only half century (52). The second was against Sussex in 1825.
