= Percy Smith (English cricketer) =

English clergyman and cricketer

Personal information
- Born: 30 March 1804; Chichester, Sussex, England
- Died: 21 February 1876 (aged 71); Pattiswick, Essex

Domestic team information
- Years: Team
- 1825: Cambridge University
- Source: CricketArchive, 31 March 2013

Percy Smith (30 March 1804 – 21 February 1876) was an English clergyman and cricketer who played for Cambridge University in two matches in 1825, totalling 9 runs with a highest score of 9, holding one catch and taking 2 wickets.

== Bibliography ==
- Haygarth, Arthur (1862). Scores & Biographies, Volume 1 (1744–1826). Lillywhite.
