= William Greenway =

English cricketer

William Whitmore Greenway (5 March 1798, Nuneaton, Warwickshire – 28 May 1868, Mount Bosworth, Leicestershire) was an English amateur cricketer who played from 1819 to 1820 for Cambridge University Cricket Club, making 3 known appearances.

== Life ==
William Greenway was educated at Rugby School and Trinity Hall, Cambridge. He subsequently became ordained as an Anglican clergyman.

== Bibliography ==
- Arthur Haygarth, Scores & Biographies, Volume 1 (1744–1826), Lillywhite, 1862
