= Stephen Southon =

English cricketer

Stephen Southon (28 October 1806 – 10 March 1880) was an English cricketer who played for Kent in 1825 and 1826. All four of his important matches were against Sussex. Southon, who played as a wicket-keeper, had played for Kent against Hawkhurst in a non-first class match in 1823 alongside his brother, Charles.

Southon was born at Benenden in Kent, possibly the son of the village butcher, and emigrated to the United States in 1827. He died in Albany, New York, in 1880 aged 73.

== Bibliography ==
- Carlaw, Derek (2020). Kent County Cricketers, A to Z: Part One (1806–1914) (PDF). Cardiff: ACS.
