= William Greenwood (cricketer) =

English cricketer

Personal information
- Born: 10 April 1798; England
- Died: 9 June 1872 (aged 74); Brookland Park, Kent, England

Domestic team information
- Years: Team
- 1828: Hampshire
- 1818: Marylebone Cricket Club

Career statistics
Competition	FC
Matches	2
Runs scored	12
Batting average	6.00
100s/50s	–/–
Top score	9
Balls bowled	–
Wickets	–
Bowling average	–
5 wickets in innings	–
10 wickets in match	–
Best bowling	–
Catches/stumpings	3/–
- Source: Cricinfo, 15 February 2010

William Greenwood (10 April 1798 – 9 June 1872) was an amateur English cricketer who made his debut for Marylebone Cricket Club (MCC) in 1818, playing a single match for the club against Hampshire.

Ten years after his last appearance, Greenwood represented Hampshire in a single match against an early England in 1828.

Greenwood died at Brookland Park, Kent on 9 June 1872.
