= Alexander Pitcairn =

English cricketer

Personal information
- Born: 1750
- Died: 17 November 1814 (aged 63–64); Eynsford, Kent
- Role: Batsman

Domestic team information
- Years: Team
- 1791–1792: Marylebone Cricket Club (MCC)
- 1791: Gentlemen of England
- 1791: Gentlemen of Kent
- 1792: T. A. Smith's XI
- 1792: Hampshire

Alexander Pitcairn (1750 – 17 November 1814) was an English cricketer who is known to have played in nine historically important matches in 1791 and 1792. (Note: Any match listed in the ACS' Important Match Guide (1981) is historically important, and therefore of the highest standard, whether or not a scorecard might exist. The same applies to numerous matches discovered by researchers since 1981. For further information, see First-class cricket.)

Pitcairn was born in 1750, and educated at Harrow School. He made his known debut for Marylebone Cricket Club (MCC) against Middlesex at Lord's Old Ground in May 1791. After playing in two more matches that season, he played in six in 1792. Five of Pitcairn's nine matches were for MCC; he also played for Hampshire, the Gentlemen of England, the Gentlemen of Kent, and T. A. Smith's XI.

Pitcairn died at Eynsford, Kent in 1814.

== Bibliography ==
- ACS (1981). A Guide to Important Cricket Matches Played in the British Isles 1709–1863. Nottingham: ACS. OCLC 85045528.
- Haygarth, Arthur (1996) [1862]. Scores & Biographies, Volume 1 (1744–1826). Kennington: Frederick Lillywhite. ISBN 978-19-00592-23-9.
