= Thomas Flavel =

English cricketer

Thomas Flavel (1793 – July 1829) was an English professional cricketer who played from 1821 to 1828.

An all-rounder who bowled and kept wicket, Flavel was mainly associated with Surrey. He made 22 known appearances and represented the Players in the Gentlemen v Players series.
