= Thomas Lloyd (cricketer) =

English cricketer

Captain Thomas Lloyd (details of birth and death unknown) was an English cricketer who played in one match for Berkshire in 1792.

Lloyd played for Berkshire against Marylebone Cricket Club (MCC) at Old Field, Bray from 2 to 4 August 1792. He made scores of 1 not out and 9 in the match, which Berkshire won by 10 runs.

== Bibliography ==
- Buckley, G.B. (1937). Fresh Light on Pre-Victorian Cricket. Cotterell.
- Haygarth, Arthur (1862). Scores & Biographies, Volume 1 (1744-1826). Lillywhite.
