= Henry Palliser (cricketer) =

English cricketer

Personal information
- Born: 9 September 1793; Chatham, Kent, England
- Died: 17 December 1864 (aged 71); Dover, Kent
- Source: CricketArchive, 28 March 2013

Henry Palliser (9 September 1793 – 17 December 1864) was an English cricketer who is recorded in one match in 1822, totalling 13 runs with a highest score of 10 and holding one catch.

== Bibliography ==
- Haygarth, Arthur (1862). Scores & Biographies, Volume 1 (1744–1826). Lillywhite.
