= John Stevens (cricketer, born 1769) =

English cricketer

John Stevens (1769 – 13 January 1863) was an English cricketer who made 11 known appearances from 1789 to 1793.

Stevens was born at South Ockendon in Essex in 1769. He made his debut for Essex against Marylebone Cricket Club (MCC) at Lord's Old Ground in 1789, going on to play in ten more matches. All of these were for Essex-based teams: four for Essex, six for Hornchurch Cricket Club and one for a team organised by Richard Newman which played at Navestock Side in the county. He is known to have played in other matches for Essex between 1793 and 1808 as well as playing for other teams.

Stevens died at Hornchurch in 1863.
