= James Grinham =

English cricketer

James Grinham (christened 20 December 1798 at Godalming, Surrey; details of death unknown) was an English amateur cricketer who played from 1822 to 1835. He was mainly associated with Sussex and made 13 known appearances in important matches including 1 for the Gentlemen.

== Bibliography ==
- Arthur Haygarth, Scores & Biographies, Volume 1 & 2 (1744–1840), Lillywhite, 1862
