= Andrew Schabner =

English cricketer

Andrew William Schabner (29 October 1786 – 25 October 1838) was an English cricketer who made 15 known appearances from 1811 to 1824. He was mainly associated with Marylebone Cricket Club (MCC) but also played for Surrey, Middlesex and Hampshire.
