= Gustavus T. Smith =

English cricketer

Gustavus T. Smith (born c.1800 in England; died 6 January 1875 at Alderminster, Wiltshire) was an English amateur cricketer who played from 1815 to 1823. Mainly associated with Marylebone Cricket Club (MCC), he made 5 known appearances in important matches.

== Sources ==
- Haygarth, Arthur (1862). Scores & Biographies, Volume 1 (1744-1826). Lillywhite.
