= John Goldham =

English cricketer

John Goldham aka Goldhawk (dates unknown) was an English professional cricketer who made 35 known appearances in important matches from 1791 to 1812.

== Career ==
He was mainly associated with Middlesex.

== External sources ==
- CricketArchive record
