= William Keen (cricketer) =

English cricketer

William Keen (born 1792 at Godalming, Surrey; died 26 June 1846 at Godalming) was an English amateur cricketer who played from 1821 to 1831. He was mainly associated with Surrey and made 28 known appearances, including three for the Gentlemen between 1824 and 1830.

== Bibliography ==
- Arthur Haygarth, Scores & Biographies, Volumes 1–2 (1744–1840), Lillywhite, 1862
