= James de Visme =

English cricketer

James Edward de Visme (1791 – 12 November 1859) was an English cricketer associated with Marylebone Cricket Club who was active in the 1820s. He is recorded in one match in 1825, totalling 2 runs with a highest score of 1.

== Bibliography ==
- Haygarth, Arthur (1996) [1862]. Scores & Biographies, Volume 1 (1744–1826). Kennington: Frederick Lillywhite. ISBN 978-19-00592-23-9.
- Haygarth, Arthur (1997) [1862]. Scores & Biographies, Volume 2 (1827–1840). Kennington: Frederick Lillywhite. ISBN 978-19-00592-23-9.
