= Benjamin Clifton =

English cricketer (born 1774)

Benjamin Clifton (born 1774) was an English amateur cricketer who made eight known appearances in important matches in 1798.

Clifton was mainly associated with Marylebone Cricket Club but also represented England and the Montpelier Cricket Club.
