= Littleton Powys (cricketer) =

English cricketer

Personal information
- Born: 23 January 1771; Lilford Park, Northamptonshire, England
- Died: 22 January 1842 (aged 70); Thrapston, Northamptonshire

Domestic team information
- Years: Team
- 1801: Surrey
- Source: CricketArchive, 23 March 2013

Littleton Powys (23 January 1771 – 22 January 1842) was an English cricketer who was active in the 1800s playing for Surrey. He is recorded in one match in 1801, totalling 13 runs with a highest score of 10.

Powys was born in Lilford Park, Northamptonshire, and died at Thrapston, Northamptonshire, aged 71.

== Bibliography ==
- Haygarth, Arthur (1862). Scores & Biographies, Volume 1 (1744–1826). Lillywhite.
