= J. S. Grover (MCC cricketer) =

English cricketer

John Grover
Personal information
- Full name: John Septimus Grover
- Born: 30 October 1766; England
- Died: 28 November 1852 (aged 86); London, England

Domestic team information
- Years: Team
- 1790: Marylebone Cricket Club (MCC)
- Source: CricketArchive, 16 August 2019

John Septimus Grover (30 October 1766 – 28 November 1852) was an English amateur cricketer who played a single match for the Marylebone Cricket Club against a Hornchurch team at Lord's Old Ground in May 1790, scoring 3 and 18 not out. He took 3 wickets in one innings, all bowled.
