= Richard Lane (cricketer) =

English cricketer

Richard Lane (2 January 1794 at Langham, Essex – 26 January 1870 at Hove, Sussex) was an English amateur cricketer who played from 1820 to 1824. He was mainly associated with Marylebone Cricket Club (MCC), of which he was a member. He made 4 known appearances.

== Bibliography ==
- Arthur Haygarth, Scores & Biographies, Volume 1 (1744–1826), Lillywhite, 1862
