= Daniel Stacey =

English cricketer

Daniel George Stacey or Stacy (31 August 1785 at St Aldate's, Oxford – 25 January 1863 at Hornchurch, Essex) was an English cleric and academic, a Fellow of New College, Oxford from 1809 to 1832. As an amateur, he was a cricketer who played from 1817 to 1820.

Mainly associated with Marylebone Cricket Club (MCC), he made three known appearances in important matches. He played for the Gentlemen in the Gentlemen v Players series.

== Sources ==
- Arthur Haygarth, Scores & Biographies, Volumes 1-11 (1744–1870), Lillywhite, 1862-1872
