= William Sewell (cricketer) =

English cricketer

William Henry Sewell (died 13 March 1862) was an English amateur cricketer who played from 1822 to 1827. He was mainly associated with Marylebone Cricket Club (MCC), of which he was a member, and made 8 known appearances, including 4 for the Gentlemen.

== Bibliography ==
- Haygarth, Arthur (1996) [1862]. Scores & Biographies, Volume 1 (1744–1826). Kennington: Frederick Lillywhite. ISBN 978-19-00592-23-9.
- Haygarth, Arthur (1997) [1862]. Scores & Biographies, Volume 2 (1827–1840). Kennington: Frederick Lillywhite. ISBN 978-19-00592-23-9.
