= Thomas Nicoll (cricketer, born 1798) =

English cricketer

Thomas Nicoll (born 1 July 1798 at Hendon, Middlesex; died 15 January 1883 at Shenley, Hertfordshire) was an English amateur cricketer who played from 1817 to 1835. He was mainly associated with Hampshire and with Marylebone Cricket Club (MCC), of which he was a member. He made 28 known appearances.

== Bibliography ==
- Arthur Haygarth, Scores & Biographies, Volumes 1-2 (1744–1840), Lillywhite, 1862
