= Charles Cumberland (English cricketer) =

English cricketer (1764–1835)

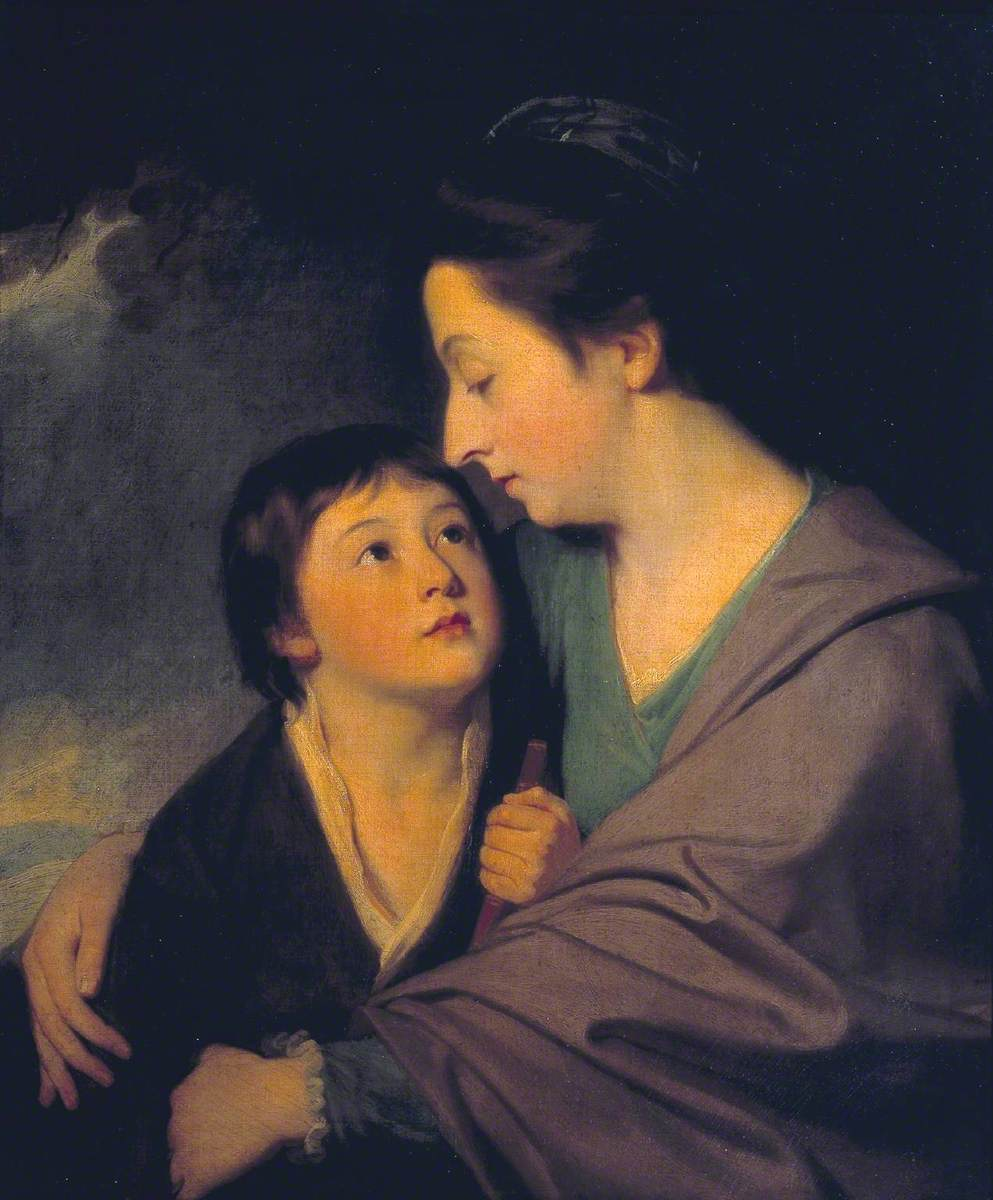
Mrs Richard Cumberland and her son Charles (when about 8 years old). Portrait by George Romney, circa 1772.

Charles Cumberland (21 May 1764 – 12 May 1835) was an English cricketer of the late 18th and early 19th centuries who is known to have played in 26 important matches.

Cumberland's known cricket career spanned the 1787 to 1805 seasons. Though mostly associated with Marylebone Cricket Club (MCC) and its predecessor the White Conduit Club, he also played for England, Hampshire, Kent, and Middlesex. Cumberland was an accomplished underarm bowler. In his career, he took 76 wickets in his 26 matches, twice achieving ten in a match.

== Cricket career ==
Cumberland was born in 1764 and attended Westminster School. He is known to have lived in Tunbridge Wells. He joined the British Army and attained the rank of captain while he was still playing cricket. He was a member of the White Conduit Club and the earliest cricket match he is known to have played in was in June 1787 at the newly established Lord's Old Ground against Middlesex. One newspaper reported that "the excellence of Mr Cumberland's bowling is well known", and another that "Mr Cumberland's bowling was much commended".

Having injured his ankle by "attempting to leap over a rail", he missed the next White Conduit v Middlesex match at Lord's, later in the same month. The match report described him as "second to none as a bowler, and second to few as a fieldsman".

In September 1790, he played in two matches for Tunbridge Wells Cricket Club against Brighton. He took six wickets in the first match and then six in one innings in the return. By May 1791, Cumberland had risen to the rank of captain when he made his debut for the Gentlemen of England against Old Etonians at Lord's. He took ten wickets in the match, five in each innings.

He is known to have played in a total of 44 matches until 1805. (Note: Cumberland is known to have played in other matches from which no scorecard has been found, including in 1787 and 1790.) He played 22 matches in the three seasons from 1791 to 1793, regularly playing for MCC at Lord's. In June 1791, he travelled to Rutland for four matches at Burley Park, a ground owned by cricket's leading patron George Finch, 9th Earl of Winchilsea. In 1793 he played in ten important matches, mostly for MCC.

Cumberland played for MCC against the Thursday Club in June 1799, his only known match between August 1797 and June 1802. He returned to play for George Leycester's XI against Charles Lennox's XI at Lord's in 1802, but was not recorded again until 1804 when he played five matches for MCC. His final appearance was for MCC against England at Lord's in July 1804, taking just one wicket, and his last known match was for MCC against Homerton at Lord's in June 1805. Aged 41, he took ten wickets in the match, including seven in the second innings.
