= Francis Nicholas =

English cricketer

Francis Nicholas (born 12 June 1795 at Ealing, Middlesex; died 29 March 1858 at Ealing) was an English amateur cricketer who played from 1821 to 1830. He was mainly associated with Hampshire and with Marylebone Cricket Club (MCC), of which he was a member. He made 23 known appearances in important matches including six for the Gentlemen from 1823 to 1830.

== Bibliography ==
- Arthur Haygarth, Scores & Biographies, Volume 1 & 2 (1744–1840), Lillywhite, 1862
