= Charles Rocke =

English cricketer (1800–1865)

Personal information
- Full name: Charles Augustus Rocke
- Born: 5 October 1800; Calcutta, British India
- Died: 22 November 1865 (aged 65); Calcutta, British India
- Role: Wicket-keeper

Domestic team information
- Years: Team
- 1828: Kent

Charles Augustus Rocke (5 October 1800 – 22 November 1865) was an English cricketer who played in six matches between 1822 and 1828.

Rocke was born at Calcutta in British India in 1800, the third son of Richard and Susannah Rocke (née Pattle). He was educated at Eton before going up to Jesus College, Cambridge in 1821. He made his cricket debut for Cambridge University in 1822 and went on to play in five other important matches, playing twice for the Gentlemen against the Players and once for Marylebone Cricket Club (MCC) in 1827, and twice for Kent the following year. (Note: The identity of the Rocke who played for Kent is in some doubt. Although the appearances are generally credited to Charles Augustus the 1907 History of Kent Cricket only refers to the player as Rocke and provides no biography.) He scored a total of 47 runs and took six wickets in these matches, and is known to have also played for a team organised by Benjamin Aislabie at Lord's in 1826.

Little is known about Rocke's later life. In 1830 he was cited as a "bankrupt" in a notice in The Times and he is believed to have emigrated to Borneo in 1849, where his second cousin James Brooke was Rajah of Sarawak. He died on 22 November 1865, aged 65, at Calcutta.

== Bibliography ==
- Carlaw, Derek (2020). Kent County Cricketers, A to Z: Part One (1806–1914) (PDF). Cardiff: ACS.
