= Humphrey Repton (cricketer) =

English cricketer

- Born: 2 April 1780; Springfield, Essex
- Died: 19 December 1819 (aged 39); Hornchurch, Essex
- Education: Eton College
- Occupation: Cricketer

Humphrey Repton (christened 20 April 1780 – 19 December 1819) was an English amateur cricketer.

== Personal life ==
Humphrey Repton was a son of Humphry Repton a noted landscape gardener of the 18th Century. He was educated at Eton College, and at time of his death was associated with the Office for Auditing Public Accounts, Somerset House.

== Career ==
He was mainly associated with Marylebone Cricket Club (MCC) and he made 8 known appearances from 1812 to 1817.

== External sources ==
- CricketArchive record
