= John Sparks (cricketer, born 1778) =

English cricketer

John Sparks (1778 – 5 March 1854) was an English professional cricketer. He bowled slow underarm.

Sparks was mainly associated with Surrey and he made 50 known appearances in important matches from 1803 to 1829.

Sparks played for the Players in the second Gentlemen v Players match in 1806.

== Bibliography ==
- Carlaw, Derek (2020). Kent County Cricketers, A to Z: Part One (1806–1914) (PDF). Cardiff: ACS.
