= Henry Everett =

British cricketer

Henry Yarburgh Everett (c. 1791 – 7 May 1847) was a British amateur cricketer.

He was mainly associated with Marylebone Cricket Club (MCC) and he made 10 known appearances from 1812 to 1839.

== Bibliography ==
- Haygarth, Arthur (1996) [1862]. Scores & Biographies, Volume 1 (1744–1826). Kennington: Frederick Lillywhite. ISBN 978-19-00592-23-9.
- Haygarth, Arthur (1997) [1862]. Scores & Biographies, Volume 2 (1827–1840). Kennington: Frederick Lillywhite. ISBN 978-19-00592-23-9.
