= John Tanner (cricketer) =

English cricketer (1772–1858)

John Tanner (1772 – 23 March 1858) was an English amateur cricketer who made 53 known appearances between 1796 and 1826 when, along with Charles Warren, he was the last 18th century player to retire from the game.

== Career ==
Tanner was mainly associated with Surrey but also represented Marylebone Cricket Club (MCC) and other teams. He was "a bowler of some repute" but, except that he was an underarm bowler, it is not known which hand he used or what his style or pace were. He was an occasional wicketkeeper.

== Later years and death ==
John Tanner lived in Sutton, Surrey, where he died, aged 86, but he was buried in the cemetery at Norwood.

== Bibliography ==
- Haygarth, Arthur (1996) [1862]. Scores & Biographies, Volume 1 (1744–1826). Kennington: Frederick Lillywhite. ISBN 978-19-00592-23-9.
