= Leicestershire & Rutland Cricket Club =

Historical English cricket team

Cricket may not have reached the English counties of Leicestershire and Rutland until the 18th century. A notice in the Leicester Journal dated 17 August 1776 is the earliest known mention of cricket in the area. A few years later, a Leicestershire & Rutland Cricket Club was taking part in historically important matches. Note that in some contemporary reports the club is called simply Leicester, and occasionally Leicestershire, but the personnel involved are the same whichever title is used.

== Matches ==
The Leicester Journal on 4 August 1781 reported Leicester v Melton Mowbray at Barrowcliffe Meadow near Leicester. Melton Mowbray won by 16 runs.

Later the same season, the first reports have been found of a match between Leicester and Nottingham Cricket Club. These two old clubs forged quite a fierce rivalry. They met at Loughborough on 17 & 18 September 1781 and the game was incomplete due to a dispute. Nottingham scored 50 & 73; Leicester had scored 73 & 9–2 when the game ended prematurely because of a dispute about wide deliveries. The repercussions dragged on and the dispute remained unresolved for some years.

In 1787, Leicester played matches against Coventry and Melton Mowbray. The Coventry game is extensively recorded in Buckley. Leicester lost by an innings to Melton Mowbray but defeated Coventry by 45 runs. In September 1788, they defeated Coventry by 28 runs in another match which Buckley records.

In 1789, Leicester played Nottingham again in two matches at Loughborough. They won one each and full scorecards have survived. It is evident that by this time these teams were representative of their counties and, in 1791, they were both deemed good enough to play against Marylebone Cricket Club (MCC), but they were both well beaten. This was hardly surprising as northern cricket was still developing while the southern teams had considerable match experience.

Leicester's game against MCC was played at Burley-on-the-Hill in Rutland, which was the Earl of Winchilsea's country retreat, used as his base for foxhunting parties. It is not far from the Great North Road so communication with London was relatively easy at the time.

In 1792, Burley-on-the-Hill staged "Leicestershire & Rutland v Nottingham", the home team winning by 4 wickets and providing a historical example of the fact that Leicestershire cricket encompasses Rutland.

In a further game at Leicester in 1800, Nottingham won by an innings and the old Leicestershire & Rutland club seemed to fade away after that, apart from a couple of mentions in the early 19th century.

== 19th century ==
A Rutland team was first formed in 1814, for a match against Nottingham, and continued to play sporadically until 1964.

Little more is heard of Leicestershire cricket until the formation of the present club on 25 March 1879. Leicestershire County Cricket Club played its inaugural first-class match on 14, 15 & 16 May 1894 against Essex at Leyton. In 1895, Leicestershire County Cricket Club joined the County Championship.

For the history of Leicestershire cricket since the foundation of the county club, see : Leicestershire County Cricket Club.

== Bibliography ==
- Derek Birley, A Social History of English Cricket, Aurum, 1999
- Rowland Bowen, Cricket: A History of its Growth and Development, Eyre & Spottiswoode, 1970
- G. B. Buckley, Fresh Light on 18th Century Cricket, Cotterell, 1935
- Arthur Haygarth, Scores & Biographies, Volume 1 (1744–1826), Lillywhite, 1862
