= E. H. Budd =

English cricketer and all-around sportsman

Edward Hayward Budd (23 February 1786 – 29 March 1875) was a noted English cricketer and all-round sportsman. He was a prominent right-handed batsman and an occasional medium pace lob bowler. He was a good fielder who played in some matches as a wicket-keeper.

Always known by his initials, E. H. Budd was one of sixteen children of William Budd and his wife Ann (née Hayward). His maternal grandfather was the Rector of Uley, in Gloucestershire. At the age of 16 he was appointed to a clerkship in the War Office, from which he retired early after approximately twenty years' service.

He first played at Lord's in about 1804 and by 1807 was frequently engaged in matches there. His height was barely 5'10" and his weight for many years was uniformly 12 stone.

Budd's important match career was disrupted by the Napoleonic War, especially during the 1811 to 1815 seasons. He is first recorded by Scores & Biographies in the 1802 season, in an "odds" match; and in the 1803 season, in a match that is not universally regarded as important. He played for England versus Marylebone Cricket Club in 1804 and then made sporadic appearances until 1808 when his career took off. He continued playing until 1831.

One of his early appearances was for the Gentlemen in the second Gentlemen v Players match in 1806.

He was a member of Marylebone Cricket Club (MCC) and that was his main team, though he also played for England and for various occasional elevens, including his own. He rarely played for any county teams and then only as a given man.

As with all cricketers in the first quarter of the 19th century, his full career details are uncertain. C. H. Wheeler recorded that he played into his eighties and added that:

...he was prepared to back himself against any man in England ... in five manly sports - cricket, shooting, running, jumping and sparring. Though his celebrity was more especially for the first of the five, I have heard him say, "If there is one thing I can do better than another, it is the last-named."

His other interests included pig-keeping and tulip-growing.

== Bibliography ==
- Haygarth, Arthur (1996) [1862]. Scores & Biographies, Volume 1 (1744–1826). Kennington: Frederick Lillywhite. ISBN 978-19-00592-23-9.
- Haygarth, Arthur (1997) [1862]. Scores & Biographies, Volume 2 (1827–1840). Kennington: Frederick Lillywhite. ISBN 978-19-00592-23-9.
