= List of Players cricketers (1806–1840) =

The Gentlemen v Players fixture was first played in 1806 and, despite many difficulties in the early years, it had by 1840 become an established annual event in the English cricket calendar. Apart from the years of the two World Wars, it remained so until 1962. The purpose of the fixture was to match the best of the amateur cricketers (the Gentlemen) against the best of the paid professionals (the Players). The table below summarises the cricketers who appeared for the Players in the matches played before 1840.

== List ==
List of Players cricketers to 1840
Name	Debut season	Final season
William Ayling	1806	1806
Billy Beldham	1806	1821
John Bennett	1806	1806
Henry Bentley	1806	1822
William Fennex	1806	1806
Andrew Freemantle	1806	1806
John Hammond	1806	1806
J. Hampton	1806	1806
Thomas Howard	1806	1829
Robert Robinson	1806	1819
Jack Small	1806	1806
John Sparks	1806	1827
Tom Walker	1806	1806
John Wells	1806	1806
Lord Strathavon	1819	1819
James Powell	1819	1821
James Sherman	1819	1821
James Thumwood	1819	1821
John Sherman	1819	1821
Thomas Beagley	1819	1836
G. Wells	1820	1820
John Bowyer	1820	1825
George Brown	1820	1830
John Thumwood	1821	1821
W. C. Dyer	1821	1821
Charles Holloway	1821	1822
William Ashby	1821	1830
– Smith	1822	1822
James Jordan	1822	1824
Thomas Flavel	1822	1827
James Saunders	1822	1831
William Searle	1822	1832
Jem Broadbridge	1822	1835
William Slater	1823	1827
William Hooker	1823	1830
William Mathews	1824	1830
Edward Thwaites	1827	1827
Tom Marsden	1827	1838
Will Caldecourt	1827	1840
Fuller Pilch	1827	1849
Ned Wenman	1829	1846
James Adams	1830	1830
George Mills	1831	1831
William Lillywhite	1831	1849
George Freemantle	1832	1832
Richard Mills	1832	1837
James Cobbett	1832	1841
Daniel Hayward senior	1833	1833
Henry Beagley	1833	1833
Charles Lanaway	1834	1834
Frederick Wells	1834	1834
George Wenman	1834	1834
Thomas Barker	1834	1845
Thomas Box	1834	1853
James Dark	1835	1835
William Buckingham	1835	1835
Billy Good	1835	1842
John Bayley	1836	1836
John Wenman	1836	1836
George Jarvis	1836	1839
William Clifford	1836	1839
Sam Redgate	1836	1843
James Taylor	1837	1837
George Millyard	1837	1838
William Garrat	1837	1839
William Hillyer	1838	1851
Joe Guy	1838	1852
Tom Adams	1838	1854
Tom Sewell	1839	1847
Francis Fenner	1840	1842
Charles Hawkins	1840	1843

== See also ==
- List of Gentlemen v Players matches
- List of Players cricketers (1841–1962)
- List of Gentlemen cricketers (1806–1840)
- List of Gentlemen cricketers (1841–1962)
