= Roundarm trial matches =

Series of cricket matches in 1827

The roundarm trial matches were a series of cricket matches between Sussex and England during the 1827 English cricket season. Their purpose was to help Marylebone Cricket Club (MCC), as the game's lawgivers, decide if roundarm bowling should be legalised, or if the only legitimate style of bowling should be underarm, which had been in use since time immemorial.

== Background ==
According to John Major, it was in July 1794 that Tom Walker "lit a fuse that would smoulder for thirty years". In short, he invented the roundarm style of bowling which "foreshadowed a revolution" in the 1820s. Although the Hambledon Club agreed to let Walker exhibit the style in a match on Dartford Brent that month, they did not like it, and rejected it. In the match, Walker's XI defeated David Harris's XI by 53 runs. Only the master batsman Billy Beldham was able to cope, to any extent, with Walker's quicker roundarm deliveries.

During the first quarter of the 19th century, Kent bowler John Willes realised the potential of Walker's idea, and began to experiment with it. Willes bowled roundarm in an 1807 "odds" match, and a newspaper report said his "straight arm bowling" was "an obstacle against getting runs". Roundarm presented batsmen with additional challenges, principally faster pace and a new angle of attack. Opposition to the style arose, and became vociferous.

As far as Willes was concerned, matters came to a head at Lord's in July 1822 when he led Kent against Marylebone Cricket Club (MCC). The story goes that, having been no-balled by the umpire, Willes walked off the field, mounted his horse, and galloped away. That may have been so, but the fact remained that roundarm had caught on in county cricket, regardless of what MCC may have thought of it. Led by the Sussex bowlers Jem Broadbridge and William Lillywhite, the reformers pressed on with their campaign.

== Conditions of play ==
The matches were also known as the "Experimental Matches". The conditions set for the matches allowed Lillywhite and Broadbridge of Sussex to bowl roundarm, while the England bowlers had to bowl underarm.

== Summary of series ==
Sussex won the first match at Sheffield against an all-professional England team by 7 wickets and the second at Lord's by 3 wickets. After the second match, the following declaration was made by some of the England players:

"We, the undersigned, do agree that we will not play the third match between England and Sussex, which is intended to be played at Brighton in July or August unless the Sussex bowlers bowl fair – this is, abstain from throwing".

It was signed by Tom Marsden, William Ashby, William Mathews, William Searle, James Saunders, Thomas Howard, Will Caldecourt, Fuller Pilch and Thomas Beagley. The declaration was later withdrawn and the third match was played at Brighton as planned. This time England won by 24 runs.

== Match details ==
Match 1 – England v Sussex at Darnall New Ground, Sheffield (4, 5 & 6 June 1827)

England 81 (F. Pilch 38; W. Lillywhite 5w, J. Broadbridge 2w) and 112 (T. Marsden 22; J. Broadbridge 5w, W. Lillywhite 2w)
Sussex 91 (J. Dale 31*, G. Meads 26; W. Mathews 3w) and 103–3 (E. Thwaites 37*)
Sussex won by 7 wickets. Their first innings was saved by a 10th wicket partnership of at least 50 between Dale and Meads.

England: Thomas Flavel, John Bowyer, James Saunders, William Barber, Tom Marsden, Fuller Pilch, George Dawson, Thomas Beagley, William Mathews, George Jarvis, Henry Jupp.
Sussex: George Brown, George Meads, Thomas Pierpoint, Edward Thwaites, Jem Broadbridge, William Slater, William Lillywhite, William Broadbridge, James Dale, Charles Duff, Charles Pierpoint

Match 2 – England v Sussex at Lord's Cricket Ground (18 & 19 June 1827)

England 152 (W. Ward 42, T. Beagley 37; C. Duff 3w, W. Lillywhite 2w) and 60 (W. Ward 20; J. Broadbridge 3w)
Sussex 96 (W. Broadbridge 21; G. T. Knight 4w) and 117–7 (J. Broadbridge 28)
Sussex won by 3 wickets in two days, the match having been scheduled for three days.

England: William Mathews, William Searle, James Saunders, William Ward, Tom Marsden, Fuller Pilch, Thomas Beagley, Henry Kingscote, George T Knight, William Ashby, Thomas Howard
Sussex: Richard Cheslyn, William Slater, Henry Morley, William Broadbridge, Edward Thwaites, Jem Broadbridge, George Brown, Thomas Pierpoint, William Lillywhite, Charles Duff, James Baker

Match 3 – Sussex v England at Royal New Ground, Brighton (23, 24 & 25 July 1827)

England 27 (W. Lillywhite 3w, J. Broadbridge 2w) and 169 (J. Saunders 44, H. R. Kingscore 31)
Sussex 77 (G. Brown 24; E. H. Budd 2w) and 95 (E. Thwaites 20, J. Dale 20; G. T. Knight 2w)
England won by 24 runs. An estimated 3,000 to 6,000 attended on each day.

England: William Searle, James Saunders, William Ward, Tom Marsden, Fuller Pilch, E. H. Budd, Thomas Beagley, George T. Knight, Henry Kingscote, George Osbaldeston, Richard Mills
Sussex: William Slater, Henry Morley, William Broadbridge, Edward Thwaites, Jem Broadbridge, George Brown, James Dale, Richard Cheslyn, James Baker, Charles Lanaway, William Lillywhite

Lillywhite and Broadbridge bowled roundarm again despite the opposition of some England players, but the England team itself used roundarm in this game as George T. Knight was a supporter of it, and subsequently did much to have it legalised.

== Conclusion ==
The result of the "trial" was inconclusive and it was many years before roundarm was formally legalised. But, in practice, roundarm was adopted in 1827 as its practitioners, especially Broadbridge and Lillywhite, continued to use it with little, if any, opposition from the umpires.

== Aftermath ==
In 1828, MCC modified Rule 10 of the Laws of Cricket to permit the bowler's hand to be raised as high as the elbow.

In 1835, powerless to prevent the use of roundarm, MCC finally amended the Laws of Cricket to make it legal. The relevant part of the Law stated: "if the hand be above the shoulder in the delivery, the umpire must call No Ball." Bowlers' hands now started to go above the shoulder and the 1835 Law had to be reinforced in 1845 by removing benefit of the doubt from the bowler in the matter of his hand's height when delivering the ball.

== Bibliography ==
- Altham, H. S.; Swanton, E. W. (1962). A History of Cricket, Volume 1 (to 1914) (5th ed.). London: George Allen & Unwin. OCLC 894274808.
- Birley, Derek (1999). A Social History of English Cricket. London: Aurum Press. ISBN 978-18-54107-10-7 – via Internet Archive.
- Bowen, Rowland (1970). Cricket: A History of its Growth and Development. London: Eyre & Spottiswoode. ISBN 978-04-13278-60-9.
- Frith, David (1975). The Fast Men. Transworld Publishing. ISBN 978-0-552-10435-7.
- Major, John (2007). More Than A Game. London: HarperCollins. ISBN 978-00-07183-64-7 – via Internet Archive.
- Haygarth, Arthur (1997) [1862]. Scores & Biographies, Volume 2 (1827–1840). Kennington: Frederick Lillywhite. ISBN 978-19-00592-23-9.
- Pycroft, Rev. James (1854). The Cricket Field. London: Longman. OCLC 1480847561.
