= 1827 English cricket season =

Cricket season review

The 1827 English cricket season was the 41st since the foundation of Marylebone Cricket Club, and it may be considered the first of the roundarm era.

Two inter-county fixtures were played among a total of thirteen historically important matches. (Note: Any match listed in the ACS' Important Match Guide (1981) is historically important, and therefore of the highest standard, whether or not a scorecard might exist. The same applies to numerous matches discovered by researchers since 1981. For further information, see First-class cricket.) Marylebone Cricket Club (MCC) played in only one important match, while England teams played in three. Other fixtures included Gentlemen v Players (twice), and the inaugural University Match. Among the season's leading players were William Ashby, Jem Broadbridge, George Knight, William Lillywhite, Tom Marsden, James Saunders, and William Ward.

== Roundarm trial matches ==
The controversy surrounding roundarm bowling came to a head before the season began, and three trial matches were played between Sussex and England. No firm conclusions were drawn in the immediate aftermath of the trials, and it was many years before roundarm was formally legalised, but in practice roundarm was adopted in 1827 as its practitioners, especially William Lillywhite and Jem Broadbridge of Sussex, continued to use it with little, if any, opposition from umpires. Underarm bowling did not cease and continued into the twentieth century with George Simpson-Hayward being the last major exponent.

== The University match ==
The first University match was held between Cambridge University and Oxford University at Lord's on 2 June. The two-day match was drawn. The match did not become an annual fixture until 1838.

== Other events ==
George Rawlins, playing for Sheffield against Nottingham on 22 August, was dismissed after he hit the ball twice. This is believed to be the second time in important English matches that a batsman was dismissed in this way, following the first by Tom Sueter in 1786. The last was in the 1906 season.

The earliest-known mention of cricket in the former county of Westmorland dates from the 1827 season.

== Leading batsmen and bowlers ==
NB: these are the KNOWN scores, runs, and wickets ONLY.

Yorkshire's Tom Marsden was the leading runscorer with 308 runs scored at a batting average of 25.66 ahead of Kent's James Saunders who scored 299 at an average of 24.91 including the season's only century.

William Ashby of Kent was the leading wicket-taker with 29 wickets, ahead of Sussex's Jem Broadbridge with 27.

== Bibliography ==
- ACS (1981). A Guide to Important Cricket Matches Played in the British Isles 1709–1863. Nottingham: ACS. OCLC 85045528.
- Bowen, Rowland (1970). Cricket: A History of its Growth and Development. London: Eyre & Spottiswoode. ISBN 978-04-13278-60-9.
- Wynne-Thomas, Peter (1983). The Rigby A-Z of Cricket Records. Adelaide: Rigby. ISBN 978-07-27018-68-7.
