= 1822 English cricket season =

Cricket season review

The 1822 English cricket season was the 36th since the foundation of Marylebone Cricket Club (MCC). John Willes brought the roundarm issue to a head and sacrificed his own career in the process. The outstanding batsman James Saunders made his known debut. Details of nine historically important eleven-a-side matches are known. (Note: Any match listed in the ACS' Important Match Guide (1981) is historically important, and therefore of the highest standard, whether or not a scorecard might exist. The same applies to numerous matches discovered by researchers since 1981. For further information, see First-class cricket.)

== Events ==
- The roundarm issue came to a head in 1822 when, in the match at Lord's, John Willes of Kent opened the bowling and was no-balled for using a roundarm action, a style he had attempted to introduce since 1807. Willes promptly withdrew from the match and refused to play again in any important fixture.
- Roundarm was a natural reaction to the growing predominance of batsmen over the age-old underarm style of bowling. Its adherents argued that the legalisation of roundarm was essential to restore the balance between batting and bowling. However, high-scoring matches were still comparatively rare owing to vagaries in pitch conditions.
- Nine matches were recorded in 1822:
  - 20–21 May — Cambridge University v Cambridge Town Club @ University Ground, Cambridge
  - 10–11 June — MCC First XII v MCC Second XII @ Lord's Cricket Ground
  - 24 June — MCC First XI v MCC Second XI @ Lord's Cricket Ground
  - 27–28 June — Godalming v Marylebone Cricket Club (MCC) @ The Burys, Godalming
  - 1–2 July — Marylebone Cricket Club (MCC) v Godalming @ Lord's Cricket Ground
  - 8–10 July — Gentlemen v Players @ Lord's Cricket Ground
  - 15–16 July — Marylebone Cricket Club (MCC) v Kent @ Lord's Cricket Ground
  - 25–27 July — Kent v Marylebone Cricket Club (MCC) @ West Kent CC, Chislehurst
  - 12–14 August — England v The Bs @ Lord's Cricket Ground

== Bibliography ==
- ACS (1981). A Guide to Important Cricket Matches Played in the British Isles 1709–1863. Nottingham: ACS. OCLC 85045528.
- Haygarth, Arthur (1996) [1862]. Scores & Biographies, Volume 1 (1744–1826). Kennington: Frederick Lillywhite. ISBN 978-19-00592-23-9.
- Warner, Pelham (1946). Lords: 1787–1945. London: Harrap. OCLC 877106024.
