= 1829 English cricket season =

Cricket season review

The 1829 English cricket season was the third of the roundarm era. The earliest known reference to cricket in Worcestershire has been found. (Note: Any match listed in the ACS' Important Match Guide (1981) is historically important, and therefore of the highest standard, whether or not a scorecard might exist. The same applies to numerous matches discovered by researchers since 1981. For further information, see First-class cricket.)

== Leading batsmen ==
Leading runscorers with 265 apiece were Jem Broadbridge @ 18.92 and William Searle @ 20.38

== Leading bowlers ==
William Lillywhite was the leading wicket-taker with 42

== Bibliography ==
- ACS (1981). A Guide to Important Cricket Matches Played in the British Isles 1709–1863. Nottingham: ACS. OCLC 85045528.
- Haygarth, Arthur (1997) [1862]. Scores & Biographies, Volume 2 (1827–1840). Kennington: Frederick Lillywhite. ISBN 978-19-00592-23-9.
- Warner, Pelham (1946). Lords: 1787–1945. London: Harrap. OCLC 877106024.
