= 1831 English cricket season =

Cricket season review

The 1831 English cricket season was the fifth of the roundarm era. Ned Wenman came to prominence. He was basically an all-rounder but he became best known as the wicket-keeper in the great Kent of the 1840s. (Note: Any match listed in the ACS' Important Match Guide (1981) is historically important, and therefore of the highest standard, whether or not a scorecard might exist. The same applies to numerous matches discovered by researchers since 1981. For further information, see First-class cricket.)

== Important matches ==
Following is the list of historically important matches played in 1831.
1. Cambridge Town XI v Cambridge University

Cambridge Town XI won by an innings and 28 runs.

2. England v The Bs

England won by an innings and 28 Runs.

3. England v Surrey

England won by 6 wickets.

4. Cambridge Town XI v Cambridge University

Cambridge Town XI won by default.

5. Married v Single

Single won by 22 Runs.

6. A to K v L to Z

L to Z won by 12 Runs.

7. Gentlemen v Players

Players won by 5 wickets.

8. Marylebone Cricket Club v England

England won by an innings and 47 runs.

9. Sheffield v Nottingham

Nottingham won by 125 runs.

== Leading batsmen ==
Ned Wenman was the leading runscorer with 144 at an average of 16.00

=== Highest runscorers ===
1. Ned Wenman - 144
2. William Ward - 108
3. Thomas Beagley - 90
4. Henry Kingscote - 87
5. Jem Broadbridge - 85

== Leading bowlers ==
William Lillywhite was the leading wicket-taker with 40 wickets.

Leading wicket takers
Player	Wickets
William Lillywhite	40
Jem Broadbridge	30
Ned Wenman	19
Fuller Pilch	18
George Sussum	17

== First mentions ==
=== Players ===
- Thomas Grimstead (Surrey)

== Bibliography ==
- ACS (1981). A Guide to Important Cricket Matches Played in the British Isles 1709–1863. Nottingham: ACS. OCLC 85045528.
- Haygarth, Arthur (1997) [1862]. Scores & Biographies, Volume 2 (1827–1840). Kennington: Frederick Lillywhite. ISBN 978-19-00592-23-9.
- Warner, Pelham (1946). Lords: 1787–1945. London: Harrap. OCLC 877106024.
