= 1832 English cricket season =

Cricket season review

The 1832 English cricket season was the sixth of the roundarm era. (Note: Any match listed in the ACS' Important Match Guide (1981) is historically important, and therefore of the highest standard, whether or not a scorecard might exist. The same applies to numerous matches discovered by researchers since 1981. For further information, see First-class cricket.) No team was proclaimed as "champion county". The season was overshadowed by the death of James Saunders on 27 March. He was only 29 and had been ill with consumption for the last two years. Scores and Biographies states that he was a "great batsman" who "had scarcely reached his prime". He was a fine attacking batsman who had the potential to be one of the greats.

== Important matches ==
- 1832 match list

== Leading batsmen ==
Fuller Pilch was the leading runscorer with 287 @ 31.88

Other leading batsmen were William Ward, Ned Wenman, William Lillywhite and Jem Broadbridge

== Leading bowlers ==
William Lillywhite was the leading wicket-taker with 71.

Other leading bowlers were C. J. Harenc, Fuller Pilch, J. Cobbett, W. H. Caldecourt and Jem Broadbridge

== Bibliography ==
- ACS (1981). A Guide to Important Cricket Matches Played in the British Isles 1709–1863. Nottingham: ACS. OCLC 85045528.
- Haygarth, Arthur (1997) [1862]. Scores & Biographies, Volume 2 (1827–1840). Kennington: Frederick Lillywhite. ISBN 978-19-00592-23-9.
- Warner, Pelham (1946). Lords: 1787–1945. London: Harrap. OCLC 877106024.
