= 1827 in sports =

1827 in sports describes the year's events in world sport.

== Boxing ==
Events

- 2 January — Peter Crawley defeats Jem Ward in 11 rounds at Royston to win the English Championship.
- 4 January — Crawley announces his retirement from boxing and refuses a return bout with Ward, who thereupon reclaims the title.

== Cricket ==
Events

- In an effort to resolve the roundarm bowling controversy, MCC agrees to the staging of three trial matches between Sussex and England. No firm conclusions are drawn in the immediate aftermath of the trials and it will be many years before roundarm is formally legalised.
- 4 June — Cambridge University versus Oxford University at Lord's is the inaugural University Match. It will become an annual fixture in 1838.

England

- Most runs – Tom Marsden 308 @ 25.66 (HS 65*)
- Most wickets – William Ashby 29 (BB 8–?)

== Horse racing ==
England

- 1,000 Guineas Stakes – Arab
- 2,000 Guineas Stakes – Turcoman
- The Derby – Mameluke
- The Oaks – Gulnare
- St. Leger Stakes – Matilda
