= 1828 in sports =

1828 in sports describes the year's events in world sport.

== Boxing ==
Events

- 27 May — Jem Ward retains his English Championship with a 17-round victory over Jack Carter at Shepperton.

== Cricket ==
Events

- Following the roundarm trial matches in 1827, MCC modifies Rule 10 of the Laws of Cricket to permit the bowler's hand to be raised as high as the elbow. An impasse results as, in practice, Sussex bowlers William Lillywhite and Jem Broadbridge continue to bowl at shoulder height and the umpires do not no-ball them.

England

- Most runs – Jem Broadbridge 316 @ 19.75 (HS 71)
- Most wickets – Jem Broadbridge 46 (BB 5–?)

== Horse racing ==
England

- 1,000 Guineas Stakes – Zoe
- 2,000 Guineas Stakes – Cadland
- The Derby – Cadland
- The Oaks – Turquoise
- St. Leger Stakes – The Colonel

== Rowing ==
Events

- Anthony Brown, a Tyneside boat builder, develops the first crude riggers on rowing boats for racing.
