= 1824 English cricket season =

Cricket season review

The 1824 English cricket season was the 38th since the foundation of Marylebone Cricket Club (MCC). Gentlemen v Players was an odds game with 14 on the Gentlemen team, but the Players still won by 103 runs. Details of six historically important eleven-a-side matches are known. (Note: Any match listed in the ACS' Important Match Guide (1981) is historically important, and therefore of the highest standard, whether or not a scorecard might exist. The same applies to numerous matches discovered by researchers since 1981. For further information, see First-class cricket.)

== Events ==
- There is evidence of a county club having been formed in Devonshire, though the current Devon County Cricket Club dates from 1899.
- Six matches were recorded in 1824:
  - 5 July – Marylebone Cricket Club (MCC) v Godalming @ Lord's Cricket Ground
  - 20 July – Godalming v Marylebone Cricket Club (MCC) @ The Burys, Godalming
  - 26 July – England v The Bs @ Lord's Cricket Ground
  - 2 August – Gentlemen XIV v Players XI @ Lord's Cricket Ground
  - 6 August – Sussex v Godalming @ Petworth Park
  - 13 August – Godalming v Sussex @ The Burys, Godalming

== Bibliography ==
- ACS (1981). A Guide to Important Cricket Matches Played in the British Isles 1709–1863. Nottingham: ACS. OCLC 85045528.
- Haygarth, Arthur (1996) [1862]. Scores & Biographies, Volume 1 (1744–1826). Kennington: Frederick Lillywhite. ISBN 978-19-00592-23-9.
- Warner, Pelham (1946). Lords: 1787–1945. London: Harrap. OCLC 877106024.
