= Broadbridge (surname) =

Broadbridge is a surname. Notable people with the surname include:

- Arthur Frederick Broadbridge (1915–2009), Canadian diplomat
- Charles Broadbridge (1798–1841), English cricketer
- Claire Broadbridge (1937–2017), Trinidadian conservationist and museum curator
- Jem Broadbridge (1795–1843), English cricketer
- John Broadbridge, English cricketer
- Robert Broadbridge, English cricketer
- Tom Broadbridge (born 1943), Australian film producer
- Troy Broadbridge (1980–2004), Australian rules footballer
- William Broadbridge (1790–1860), English cricketer
