= William Peto =

English cricketer

Personal information
- Relatives: John Peto (brother)

Domestic team information
- Years: Team
- 1822–1825: Godalming
- 1826: Hampshire and Surrey XI

Career statistics
Competition	First-class
Matches	9
Runs scored	112
Batting average	9.33
100s/50s	0/0
Top score	18
Catches/stumpings	3/–
- Source: Cricinfo, 17 November 2013

William Peto (dates of birth and death unknown) was an English cricketer. Peto's batting style is unknown.

Peto made his debut in first-class cricket for Godalming against the Marylebone Cricket Club (MCC) in 1822 at The Burys, Godalming. He made seven further first-class appearances for Godalming, the last of which came against Hampshire in 1825. In his eight first-class appearances for Godalming, Peto scored 108 runs at an average of 10.80, with a high score of 18. He made a ninth and final appearance in first-class cricket for a combined Surrey and Surrey cricket team against Sussex at Petworth Park.

His brother John Peto also played first-class cricket.
