= 1825 English cricket season =

Cricket season review

The 1825 English cricket season was the 39th since the foundation of Marylebone Cricket Club (MCC). The pavilion at Lord's was destroyed by fire. Many irreplaceable documents which recorded early cricket matches are believed to have been lost. The impact of this upon cricket's history is that it is only since 1825 that surviving records can be viewed with anything like complete confidence. Inter-county matches are recorded for the first time since 1796. Two of the greatest players of the 19th century, William Lillywhite and Ned Wenman, made their first known appearances in historically important matches. (Note: Any match listed in the ACS' Important Match Guide (1981) is historically important, and therefore of the highest standard, whether or not a scorecard might exist. The same applies to numerous matches discovered by researchers since 1981. For further information, see First-class cricket.)

== Important matches by date ==
- 23 May. Cambridge University v Cambridge Town Club on the University Ground, Cambridge. University won by 109 runs.
- 13–14 June. Sussex v Kent on the Royal New Ground, Brighton. Sussex won by 243 runs. The first inter-county match to be played since 1796.
- 16 June. Marylebone Cricket Club (MCC) v Godalming at Lord's, Marylebone. MCC won by 86 runs.
- 23 June. Godalming v MCC at The Burys, Godalming. Godalming won by an innings & 139 runs.
- 27 June. Hampshire v Godalming at Bramshill Park, Hampshire. Unfinished.
- 27–28 June. Kent v Sussex on Hawkhurst Moor. Kent won by 16 runs.
- 4–7 July. Gentlemen XVI v Players XI at Lord's. Gentlemen won by 72 runs.
- 11 July. England v The Bs at Lord's. England won by 134 runs.
- 18 July. Godalming v Hampshire at The Burys. Godalming won by 202 runs.
- 8–9 August. Sussex v Hampshire at Petworth Park. Sussex won by 177 runs.
- 15 August. Hampshire v Sussex at Bramshill Park. Hampshire won by 72 runs.
- 5 September. Sheffield v Leicester on the Darnall New Ground, Sheffield. Leicester won by 10 wickets.
- 12 September. Bury St Edmunds v Nottingham at Rougham Park, Bury St Edmunds. Bury St Edmunds won by 33 runs.

== County cricket ==
Inter-county cricket was revived for the first time since 1796 with Sussex playing two matches each against Hampshire and Kent, the home team winning every time. Hampshire and Kent did not play each other. Based on the known results, the strongest team was probably Sussex, but there was no Champion County as such. (Note: "Champion County" is an unofficial seasonal title proclaimed by media or historians prior to December 1889 when the official County Championship was constituted.)

== Other events ==
- On Thursday 28 July, a schools match at Lord's between Harrow and Winchester had just concluded and then, during the night, the pavilion burned down with the consequent loss of valuable scorecards, records and trophies. Thomas Lord claimed he lost £2600 in paid subscriptions, none of which were ever recovered, raising the questions of why it wasn't in the bank and why he apparently wasn't insured.
- William Ward purchased the lease of Lord's ground from Thomas Lord, who retained freehold. Lord had been proposing to build houses on the land which brought cries of outrage from the gentlemen players. Ward, a rich banker as well as a fine batsman, stepped in and bought the leasehold to save the ground for cricket.

== Bibliography ==
- ACS (1981). A Guide to Important Cricket Matches Played in the British Isles 1709–1863. Nottingham: ACS. OCLC 85045528.
- Haygarth, Arthur (1996) [1862]. Scores & Biographies, Volume 1 (1744–1826). Kennington: Frederick Lillywhite. ISBN 978-19-00592-23-9.
- Warner, Pelham (1946). Lords: 1787–1945. London: Harrap. OCLC 877106024.
