= Richard Searle (disambiguation) =

Richard Searle is a bass guitarist.

Richard Searle may also refer to:

- Richard Searle (Sussex cricketer) (1789–?), cricketer for Sussex
- Richard Searle (Queensland cricketer) (born 1934), cricketer for Queensland
