= Henry Morley (cricketer, born 1785) =

English cricketer

Henry Morley (2 March 1785 – 6 December 1857) was an English cricketer who played for Sussex County from 1815 to 1838, and also played one match for Kent and Sussex in 1836.

A builder by trade, he was a team-mate of William Lillywhite and Jem Broadbridge, and played for Sussex in the 1827 Roundarm Trial Matches against England.

Henry, a right-handed batsman, played in 30 important matches, and scored 285 runs during 57 innings, with a batting average of 5.18. By no means an exceptional player, his highest score of 18 runs came during his last match for the team against Kent at the Old County Ground, Town Malling on 19 July 1838. He was caught out by Alfred Mynn, the fourth greatest cricketer of all time according to the cricket writer John Woodcock.

== Biography ==
Henry was born on 2 March 1785 in Amberley, Sussex, and was the son of John and Elizabeth Morley. He was baptised on 17 April 1785 in Amberley.

He married Frances Load Shelley (born 1781, Lewes, Sussex) at St Nicholas Church, Brighton on 26 August 1804. Over the next 20 years the couple had 9 children: Elizabeth (1805), Hannah (1811), Henry (1813), Frederick (1815), James (1816), Isaac (1818), Edward (1819), Alfred (1822), and Frances Mary, born in 1825.

His wife Frances died in 1846 at the age of 65. Henry outlived her by 11 years, and died on 6 December 1857 in Brighton.
