= Thumwood =

Thumwood is a surname. Notable people with the surname include:

- James Thumwood (1790–1853), English cricketer
- John Thumwood (1785–1839), English cricketer
