= William Buckingham =

William Buckingham may refer to:

- William Buckingham (VC) (1886–1916), English recipient of the Victoria Cross
- William Buckingham (Australian politician) (1890–1964), member of the Victorian Legislative Assembly
- William A. Buckingham (1804–1875), American politician, governor of Connecticut and United States senator
- William Buckingham (publisher) (1832–1915), Canadian newspaper publisher, author and politician
- William Buckingham (cricketer) (1798–?), English cricketer

== See also ==
- William Buckingham Curtis (1837–1900), proponent of organized athletics in America
- Will Buckingham (born 1971), English novelist, non-fiction writer, and philosopher
- William A. Buckingham House, Norwich, Connecticut
