= 1840 English cricket season =

Cricket season review

The 1840 English cricket season was the 14th of the roundarm era. (Note: Any match listed in the ACS' Important Match Guide (1981) is historically important, and therefore of the highest standard, whether or not a scorecard might exist. The same applies to numerous matches discovered by researchers since 1981. For further information, see First-class cricket.) William Lillywhite regained his place as leading wicket taker.

== Important matches ==
- 1840 match list

== Leading batsmen ==
C Hawkins was the leading runscorer with 274 @ 14.42 Other leading batsmen were: J Guy, F Pilch, T Box, CG Taylor, FP Fenner, J Cobbett, S Redgate

== Leading bowlers ==
William Lillywhite was the leading wicket-taker with 83 Other leading bowlers were: J Cobbett, S Redgate, WR Hillyer, A Mynn, J Dean, W Clarke, JH Kirwan, CG Taylor

== Bibliography ==
- ACS (1981). A Guide to Important Cricket Matches Played in the British Isles 1709–1863. Nottingham: ACS. OCLC 85045528.
- Haygarth, Arthur (1997) [1862]. Scores & Biographies, Volume 2 (1827–1840). Kennington: Frederick Lillywhite. ISBN 978-19-00592-23-9.
- Warner, Pelham (1946). Lords: 1787–1945. London: Harrap. OCLC 877106024.
