= William Quarles (cricketer) =

Cricketer

Personal information
- Full name: William Quarles

Domestic team information
- Years: Team
- 1820: Norfolk
- 1830: Suffolk

William Quarles (1800–1879) was an English cricketer associated with Norfolk who was active in the 1820s. He also played for Suffolk. Quarles' batting style is unknown.

Quarles made a single appearance for Norfolk against the Marylebone Cricket Club (MCC) at Lord's in 1820. The MCC scored 473 all out in their first-innings, in response Norfolk managed just 92, with Quarles batting at number eleven and ending unbeaten on 0. The MCC fared less well in their second-innings with a total of 108. This gave them a lead of 489 over Norfolk, which was more than enough as Norfolk were dismissed for 72, with Quarles himself making 2 runs before he was dismissed by William Ward. The MCC's final margin of victory was 417 runs. A decade later he appeared in his second match, this time for Suffolk against the MCC at Field Lane, Bury St Edmunds. The MCC made 100 all out in their first-innings, with Suffolk making 74 in response, with Quarles being dismissed for a duck by Herbert Jenner. The MCC were bowled out for 68 in their second-innings, leaving Suffolk with a total of 95 to chase. However, Suffolk well just short in being bowled out for 82, with Quarles contributing 4 to the total before he was dismissed by Ned Wenman.

== Bibliography ==
- Haygarth, Arthur (1996) [1862]. Scores & Biographies, Volume 1 (1744–1826). Kennington: Frederick Lillywhite. ISBN 978-19-00592-23-9.
- Haygarth, Arthur (1997) [1862]. Scores & Biographies, Volume 2 (1827–1840). Kennington: Frederick Lillywhite. ISBN 978-19-00592-23-9.
