= 1828 English cricket season =

Cricket season review

The 1828 English cricket season was the second of the roundarm era. Marylebone Cricket Club (MCC) effected a modification of the Laws of Cricket in an attempted compromise re the roundarm issue. (Note: Any match listed in the ACS' Important Match Guide (1981) is historically important, and therefore of the highest standard, whether or not a scorecard might exist. The same applies to numerous matches discovered by researchers since 1981. For further information, see First-class cricket.)

== Important matches ==
1828 match list

== Events ==
Following the Sussex v. England roundarm trial matches in 1827, MCC modified Rule 10 to permit the bowler's hand to be raised as high as the elbow. But, in practice, Sussex bowlers William Lillywhite and Jem Broadbridge continued to bowl at shoulder height and the umpires didn't no-ball them.

== Leading batsmen ==
Jem Broadbridge was the leading runscorer with 316 runs @ 19.75

== Leading bowlers ==
Jem Broadbridge was the leading wicket-taker with 46 wickets

== Bibliography ==
- ACS (1981). A Guide to Important Cricket Matches Played in the British Isles 1709–1863. Nottingham: ACS. OCLC 85045528.
- Haygarth, Arthur (1997) [1862]. Scores & Biographies, Volume 2 (1827–1840). Kennington: Frederick Lillywhite. ISBN 978-19-00592-23-9.
- Warner, Pelham (1946). Lords: 1787–1945. London: Harrap. OCLC 877106024.
