= 1833 English cricket season =

Cricket season review

The 1833 English cricket season was the seventh of the roundarm era. (Note: Any match listed in the ACS' Important Match Guide (1981) is historically important, and therefore of the highest standard, whether or not a scorecard might exist. The same applies to numerous matches discovered by researchers since 1981. For further information, see First-class cricket.) "Yorkshire" was used as a team name for the first time on record because Sheffield were playing against a county team. John Nyren published The Cricketers Of My Time, widely regarded as a classic of cricket literature.

== Important matches ==
1833 match list

== Events ==
- John Nyren published The Cricketers Of My Time. It had been serialised in The Town during the previous year.

== Leading batsmen ==
Tom Marsden was the leading runscorer with 181 @ 16.45

Other leading batsmen were: F. Pilch, C. A. Wilkinson, W. Ward, E. G. Wenman

== Leading bowlers ==
William Lillywhite was the leading wicket-taker with 37

Other leading bowlers were: A. Mynn, C. J. Harenc, J. Cobbett, Mathew Daplyn, F. Pilch, J. Broadbridge

== Bibliography ==
- ACS (1981). A Guide to Important Cricket Matches Played in the British Isles 1709–1863. Nottingham: ACS. OCLC 85045528.
- Haygarth, Arthur (1997) [1862]. Scores & Biographies, Volume 2 (1827–1840). Kennington: Frederick Lillywhite. ISBN 978-19-00592-23-9.
- Warner, Pelham (1946). Lords: 1787–1945. London: Harrap. OCLC 877106024.
