= Suffolk county cricket team (1764–1863) =

Historical English cricket team

Suffolk
Team information
- Established: c. 1764
- Last match: 1859
- Home venue: Field Lane, Bury St Edmunds

History
- Notable players: Fuller Pilch

Until 1863, the Suffolk county cricket team, always known as Suffolk, was organised by individual patrons and other groups, in particular the Bury St Edmunds Cricket Club. It is known to have played matches, some against other county teams, from 1764 until the formation of Suffolk County Cricket Club in 1864.

== 18th century ==
The earliest known reference to cricket in Suffolk is from 1743, and the first mention of a team called Suffolk is on 23 August 1764, in a match against Norfolk on the racecourse at Bury St Edmunds. Norfolk won this match, which was reported in the Gazetteer & London Daily Advertiser on Tuesday, 28 August. Suffolk played two further matches against Norfolk on 10 and 12 September on Scole Common.

== 19th century ==
Suffolk was next recorded in 1827, playing against Marylebone Cricket Club (MCC). It was during this time that the Bury St Edmunds club became prominent, its reputation enhanced when Fuller Pilch joined in 1825. It was the Bury Club, as it was often called, playing under the name of Suffolk, that played two historically important matches against MCC in 1830, one at Lord's and the other at Field Lane, Bury St Edmunds. In 1847, Suffolk played two more important matches against MCC at the same venues.

== Players ==
Among Suffolk's own players were James Adams, Thomas Blake, Henry Knatchbull, and Edward Leathes. These were useful players but, Fuller Pilch aside, the Suffolk team was weak, and could only play MCC with the help of given men. Several top-class players assisted Suffolk in one or more of the four matches: Charles Arnold, Thomas Beagley, Jem Broadbridge, William Clarke, William Dorrinton, William Mathews, Alfred Mynn, and William Searle.

== County club founded ==
Teams representative of Suffolk continued to play minor matches until at least 1859, when an England Eleven played the county. The original Suffolk County Cricket Club was formed on 27 July 1864. It was reconstituted in 1932, and has always been a minor county team.

== Bibliography ==
- ACS (1981). A Guide to Important Cricket Matches Played in the British Isles 1709–1863. Nottingham: ACS. OCLC 85045528.
- Bowen, Rowland (1970). Cricket: A History of its Growth and Development. London: Eyre & Spottiswoode. ISBN 978-04-13278-60-9.
- Buckley, G. B. (1935). Fresh Light on 18th Century Cricket. Birmingham: Cotterell & Co. OCLC 23450280.
