= 1826 in sports =

1826 in sports describes the year's events in world sport.

== Boxing ==
Events

- 30 June — Jem Ward retains his English Championship title when he defeats Phil Sampson in ten rounds at Norwich.

== Cricket ==
Events

- Inter-county cricket flourishes again, mainly through the efforts of the Sussex county organisation based on the Midhurst club. Sussex plays matches against Kent and a combined Hampshire/Surrey team.
- The pavilion at Lord's Cricket Ground has been rebuilt following the fire in July 1825. From this time on, cricket records are more certain and will become increasingly so as scorecard data increases (e.g., to include the name of the bowler when a catch is taken) and standards of scoring become widely accepted.
- 24, 25 and 26 July – Yorkshire's first great player Tom Marsden scores 227 for Sheffield and Leicester v Nottingham at the Darnall New Ground in Sheffield. This score beats the 167 scored by James Aylward in 1777 and is the new individual record for first-class cricket.
- 31 December — death of John Small, the great Hambledon batsman

England

- Most runs – Tom Marsden 227 @ 227.00 (HS 227: he had just the one first-class innings)
- Most wickets – William Lillywhite 27 (BB 9–?)

== Horse racing ==
England

- 1,000 Guineas Stakes – Problem
- 2,000 Guineas Stakes – Dervise
- The Derby – Lap-dog
- The Oaks – Lilias
- St. Leger Stakes – Tarrare
