= Farringdon, Hampshire =

Village and parish in Hampshire, England

Coordinates: 51.11062°N 0.98714°W

Farringdon
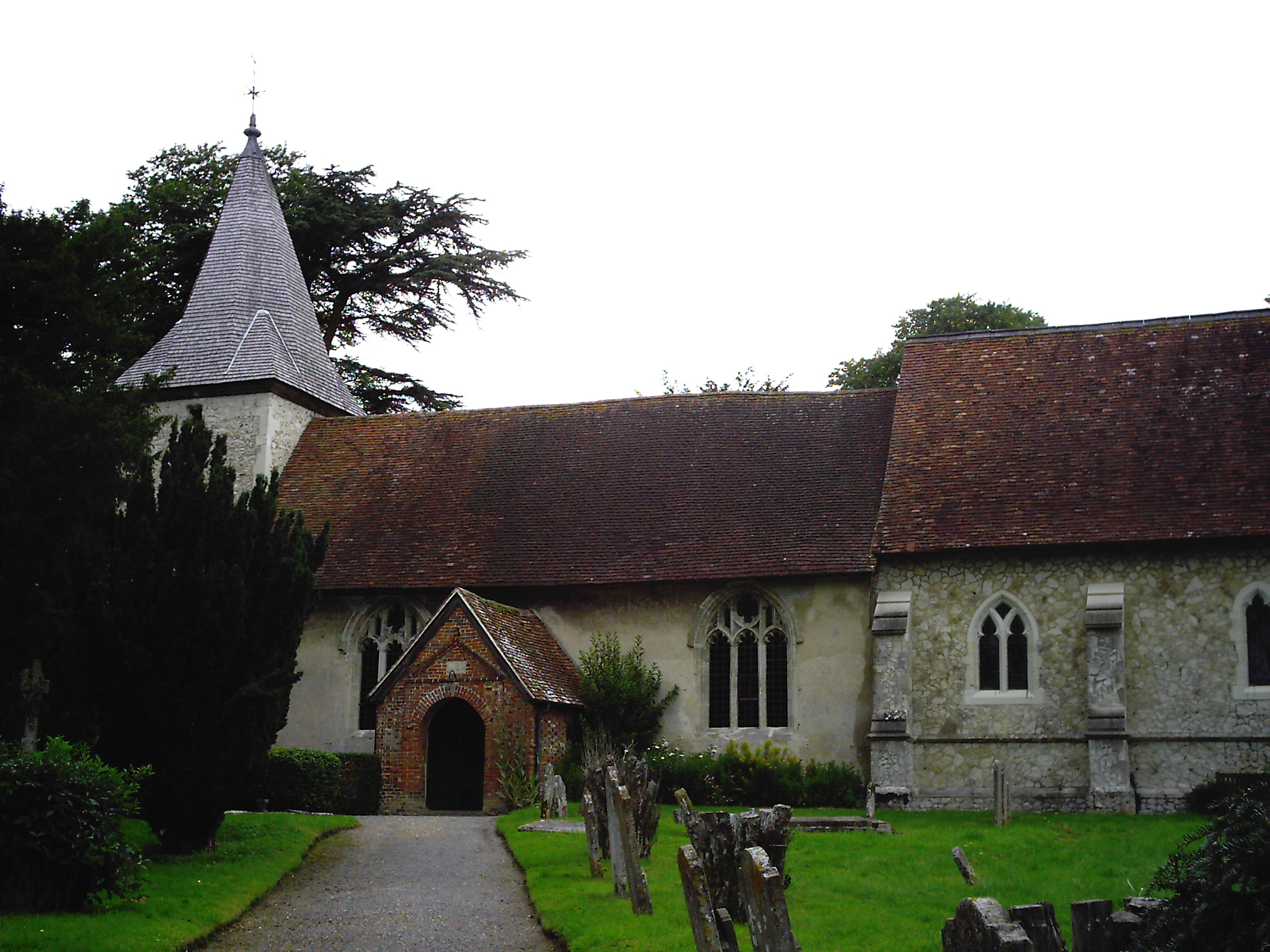
- All Saints Church

- Location within Hampshire
- Population: 664 (2011 Census)
- OS grid reference: SU709350
- Civil parish: Farringdon
- District: East Hampshire
- Shire county: Hampshire
- Region: South East
- Country: England
- Sovereign state: United Kingdom
- Post town: Alton
- Postcode district: GU34
- Dialling code: 01420
- Police: Hampshire and Isle of Wight
- Fire: Hampshire and Isle of Wight
- Ambulance: South Central
- Website: Parish Council website

Farringdon is a civil parish in the East Hampshire district of Hampshire, England. It is 2.8 miles (4.5 km) south of Alton, on the A32 road, close to a source of the River Wey.

The village has two parts, the larger being Upper Farringdon. Lower Farringdon is on the Alton to Gosport road, the A32. The 2001 census predicted a population for Farringdon Parish by 2006 of 495, increasing to 664 at the 2011 Census.

The northern of the River Wey's two sources rises in countryside close to Farringdon (Grid Reference: SU707394).

== Etymology ==
Farringdon is first recorded as Ferendone in Domesday Book in 1086, deriving from the Old English, meaning the "fern-covered hill" from the Old English fearn and dun.

== History ==
=== Prehistory ===
The oldest evidence of human activity in the village dates to the Neolithic: several axeheads and arrowheads have been found in the vicinity of Lower Farringdon.

Notable archaeological finds include a complete Early Bronze Age beaker (found in September 1938) with a cruciform design on the base, of which only two examples are known; and a Roman coin, a sestertius of Trajan (found in 1936). Both are now in Alton Museum.

=== Early ownership and property ===
In Domesday Book, the manor was held by Osbern, bishop of Exeter. The bishopric of Exeter continued to hold lands and property in the village until 1797, when the advowson (patronage) to the church was given to the rector. The village has a Norman church with excellently preserved medieval encaustic tiles and a number of pre-18th century houses.

=== Enclosure ===
Lewis Cage, as lord of the manor, led the request for the enclosure of the commons and common fields in 1748. The evidence that survives is in two parts: the first found formal map of a local ridge enclosure, worn around the edges with damp marks, but listing all the recipients and placing their allotments; and five handwritten early agreement drafts with multiple gaps, insertions, crossings out, corrections and spelling inconsistences in proper nouns; these have been badly treated with tears and staining. There were five arbitrators appointed to ‘avoid difficulties and disputes' followed by familiar names from other local enclosures: William Knight and Thomas Eames, yeoman, both Chawton, 1740; and Richard Wake, senior and junior, and John and William Finden, all Soldridge, 1735.

The Farringdon enclosure is remarkable in two ways. First, it is the only enclosure agreement along the Four Marks ridge not to have the approval of an act of Parliament. Considering the desperation in the previous fifty years to secure acts for Ropley, Soldridge and Chawton, this needs explaining. Thoughts go back to the ragtag collection of scruffy copies at the Hampshire Record Office that hold the written form of the agreement, without ‘hands’, signatures, marks or seals. Perhaps there is no final legal document? Then, there is evidence of the enclosure map, carefully drawn detailed and complete in every way. There could be no doubt about what was agreed. Could it be the fast-moving landowners, with all their experience of previous enclosures, quickly made the assessors’ decisions a reality and negated a signed document?

Supporting this view is the second remarkable aspect of the Farringdon enclosure: the 427 acres (173 ha) were divided between fifty-three entities, almost all individuals. Five families took almost 60 per cent of the land: John and William Finden, 17 per cent; William Knight, 12; John Tribe, 10; two Richard Wakes, father and son, 10; and Lewis Cage, under 9. The only other significant holdings were by Mary Windybank, nearly 6 per cent; Elizabeth with Thomas Fielder, just over 5 per cent; and John Langrish, Robert Rogers, and John with Jane and James Fry, each above 3 per cent. A paltry 0.1 per cent, less than 0.5 acres (0.20 ha), was set aside for the poor of Farnham (not Alton). The remaining thirty-seven parties all received less than 2 per cent of the land; twenty of them less, or much less, than 2 acres (0.81 ha). Here are the independent commoners so significantly missing from the Chawton enclosure. It was the reason that the Farringdon agreement was relatively secure. No cottager, it seems, was thrown from their encroachment or rented plot. The lord, Lewis Cage, did not have the power, or perhaps wish, of his neighbour, Thomas Knight. The poor in Farringdon had a voice: not a voice which built a future, but one which at least maintained their past and a modicum of independence from deferential labour.

== The Farringdon Puddingstones ==
There are several outcrops of so called puddingstones in the East Hampshire area – one notable concentration being in Farringdon. One of the stones can be found on Brightstone Lane near Pies Farm. On the southern roadside one large stone is still visible (see below).

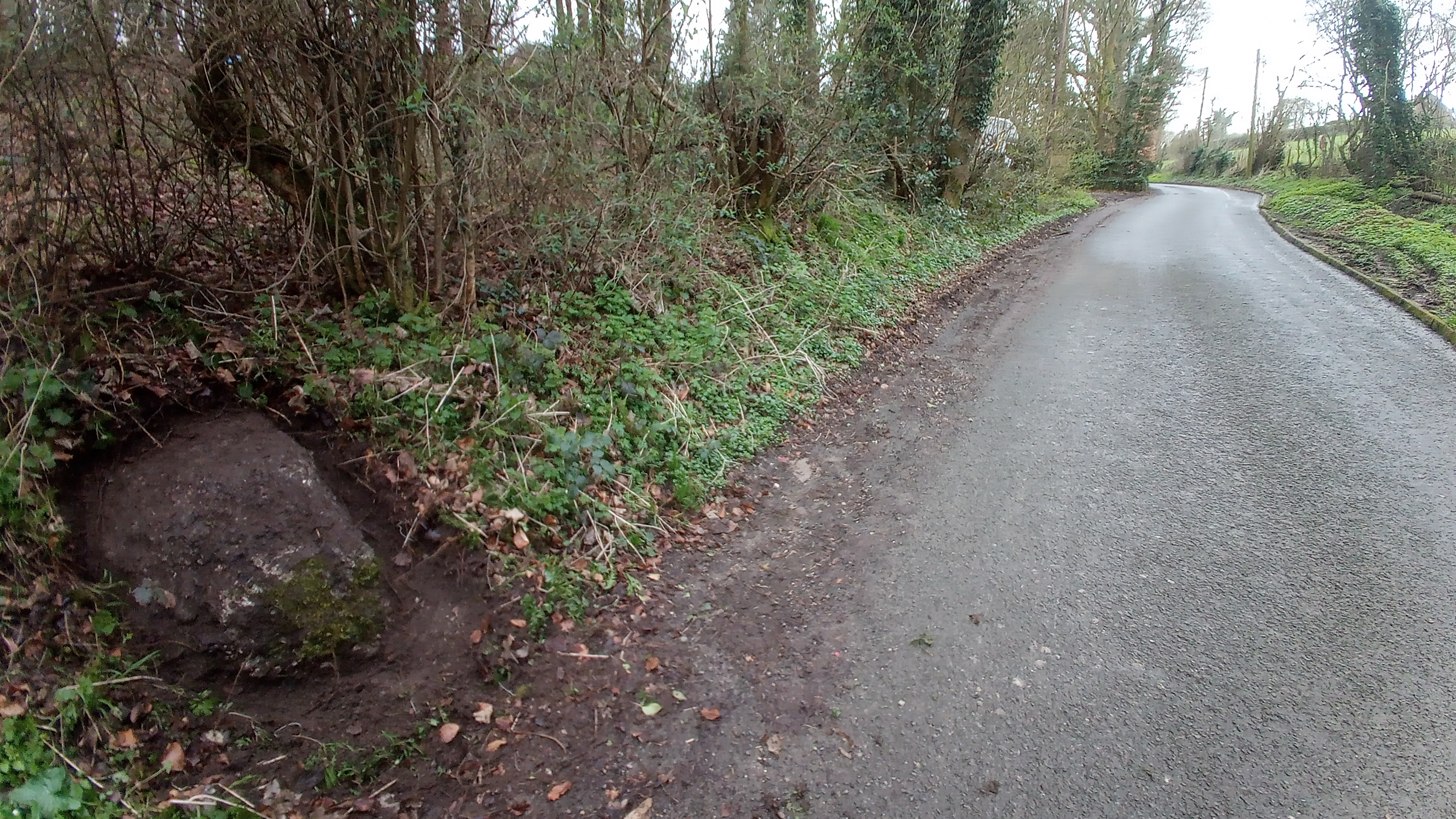
Puddingstone on Brightstone Lane, Farringdon

This outcrop on this lane led to a folkloric story recounted by local historican Marianna Hagen, daughter of Jacob Hagen, in 1929:

"There is, not far from here, a lane with overhanging woods on either side of it – a beautiful spot. It is called Bridestone Lane and is on the right hand side of the main road between Farringdon and Chawton as one comes into Ropley. The story concerning it is as follows:–

Once upon a time there was a wedding, and the terrible mistake (as it turned out) was made of not inviting the Fairies of the neighbourhood to the festivities. On the way home from church the whole wedding party was turned into stones!

These large blocks of conglomerate may still be seen by the lane side."

Hence the lane bears the name "bride stone", now spelled as Brightstone. In truth, the name probably derives from the Old English briddes dun, meaning the hill where young fowl are kept.

Many stones have been moved out of their original positions, some sitting in Ropley and some being used to create a 19th-century stone circle near Brockwood Park, near Bramdean. Other outcrops of puddingstones near Farringdon can be seen in East Worldham near the Three Horseshoes Pub.

== Notable people and buildings ==
Farringdon has associations with two of Britain's celebrated figures: the novelist Jane Austen (1775–1817) and the naturalist Gilbert White (1720–1793). Austen came from her home in nearby Chawton, a little over a mile to the north, to visit friends and acquaintances in Farringdon. From 1761 to 1785 White was curate of Farringdon's village church of All Saints, and his pulpit still survives. One of the parish registers contains entries in his handwriting. Gilbert White's house, now a museum, is a little over three miles (5 km) west of Farringdon. All Saints has Norman and 12th/13th century origins and retains good stained windows. The churchyard contains yew trees reputed to be of great antiquity; the hollow nature of the trees makes ring-counting dating impossible, but estimates have suggested that the oldest of the trees may be as much as 3,000 years old.

There are ancient and listed buildings in Farringdon, including what may be the oldest working forge in Britain, with elements dating from the 1500s. Interestingly during works on the forge during the 2000s an 18th Century coin was found in the Eastern Wall suggesting it was heavily rebuilt at that time. The forge still produces modest ironwork like benches, pergolas and farm gates, whilst also furnishing complex items like curved metal bannisters and exterior railings for clients such as Eton College and the Church of England.

A Farringdon landmark is Massey's Folly, an imposing but eccentric building with towers and battlements built by another curate of Farringdon, Rev. T.H. Massey. Its intended purpose when built was obscure, but since a few years after Massey's death in 1919 it has served as a school and village hall. It featured in the 2006 BBC TV programme, Restoration Village. Massey's Folly was sold for development as residential units in 2015. Massey also built a vicarage in the village (now a private house).

The first Cadbury Milk Tray advert was filmed in Lower Farringdon, by Woodside Road, along the old Meon Valley Railway.

The Beagley brothers (Thomas, Henry and John), who represented Hampshire at cricket (Thomas played for England), came from the village.

Reverend Thomas Henry Sparshott was born in Farringdon.

== Transport ==
Farringdon's closest railway station is at Alton, 2.8 miles (4.5 km) north of the village. The A32 passing through Lower Farringdon was formerly a major route, but the old Alton-Gosport road is passed to the west and east by two major trunk routes, the M3 and the A3(M). As result, traffic density through Farringdon is relatively light. A 30 mph limit is in force.
