= James Baker (English cricketer) =

English cricketer (1792–1839)

Personal information
- Full name: James Bray Baker
- Born: 1792; Hailsham, Sussex
- Died: 30 January 1839 (aged 46–47); Hailsham, Sussex

Domestic team information
- Years: Team
- 1816–1828: Sussex
- 1825–1826: Kent

James Bray Baker (1792 – 30 January 1839) was an English cricketer who played from 1816 to 1828. He was born at Hailsham in Sussex and was mainly associated with Sussex cricket teams.

Baker played in 15 important matches, making his debut for Sussex against Epsom at Lord's in 1816. He played seven matches for Sussex, making his final appearance for them in 1828 against England (i.e., the "rest" of England). He played four matches for The Bs against England, and four for Kent, all as a given man against Sussex in 1825 and 1826 in matches organised by the Hawkhurst club, the first matches played between two county teams since the end of the Napoleonic Wars. (Note: A given man was a player who would not usually play for a team and was generally not qualified by either birth or residence to do so. They were either recruited to play for it or "given" by the opposition, to produce a more balanced contest and, in some cases, to attract a bigger crowd. In Baker's case, his links to the Hawkhurst team are the reason he played for Kent in the four matches in question.) Baker was a member of the Hawkhurst club, which had arguably one of the best village teams in England at the time. He scored a total of 219 runs in 27 innings with a batting average of 8.42 runs per innings.

Baker played for Sussex in two of the three roundarm trial matches against England in 1827 to decide whether roundarm bowling should be legalised. (Note: Although roundarm bowling had been used sporadically since the 18th century, it remained against the Laws of Cricket at the time Baker played. The Marylebone Cricket Club (MCC) amended the Laws to allow bowlers to raise their arm to the elbow in 1828 and to the height of the shoulder in 1835 as the style gained widespread use.) He was described as a "capital but not very safe hitter and a safe field" and was originally a farmer before becoming a publican in Hailsham later in life. He died in the village in January 1839.

== Bibliography ==
- ACS (1981). A Guide to Important Cricket Matches Played in the British Isles 1709–1863. Nottingham: ACS. OCLC 85045528.
- Carlaw, Derek (2020). Kent County Cricketers, A to Z: Part One (1806–1914) (PDF). Cardiff: ACS.
- Haygarth, Arthur (1996) [1862]. Scores & Biographies, Volume 1 (1744–1826). Kennington: Frederick Lillywhite. ISBN 978-19-00592-23-9.
- Haygarth, Arthur (1997) [1862]. Scores & Biographies, Volume 2 (1827–1840). Kennington: Frederick Lillywhite. ISBN 978-19-00592-23-9.
- Milton, Howard; Francis, Peter (2020). Kent County Cricket Grounds. Worthing: Pitch Publishing. ISBN 978-17-85316-61-6.
- Moore, Dudley (1998). The History of Kent County Cricket Club. London: Christopher Helm. ISBN 978-07-47022-09-1.
