= Lanaway =

Lanaway is a surname. Notable people with the surname include:

- Charles Lanaway (1793–1870), English cricketer
