= Henry Jupp =

English cricketer

Personal information
- Born: 1802
- Died: Unknown
- Role: Batsman

Domestic team information
- Years: Team
- 1824: Godalming
- Source: CricketArchive, 20 February 2022

Henry Jupp (christened 6 August 1802) was an English cricketer who played two important matches during the 1820s. In 1824, he played for Godalming Cricket Club against Marylebone Cricket Club (MCC) at Lord's, scoring 2 runs in his sole innings. In 1827, Jupp played for England against Sussex at Darnall New Ground in the first of the roundarm trial matches, scoring 0 not out and 20.
