= Charles Abbott (cricketer) =

English cricketer

Personal information
- Full name: Charles James Abbott
- Born: 1815; St Pancras, London, England
- Died: 6 December 1889 (aged 73–74); Walton-on-Thames, Surrey, England
- Batting: Unknown
- Relatives: William Abbott (son)

Domestic team information
- Years: Team
- 1844: Surrey

Career statistics
Competition	First-class
Matches	1
Runs scored	2
Batting average	2.00
100s/50s	–/–
Top score	2
Balls bowled	–
Wickets	–
Bowling average	–
5 wickets in innings	–
10 wickets in match	–
Best bowling	–
Catches/stumpings	–/–
- Source: Cricinfo, 8 January 2012

Charles James Abbott (1815 – 6 January 1889) was an English solicitor and first-class cricketer.

== Life ==
Abbott was the son of the solicitor Charles Thelwell Abbott (died 1853). He was born at St Pancras, London, and educated at Winchester College.

Abbott was admitted a solicitor in 1841, and was for 48 years in practice, a partner in the firm of Abbott, Jenkins and Abbott, 8 New Inn, Strand, London. He died at Walton-on-Thames, Surrey on 6 January 1889. His son, William, played first-class cricket for Surrey County Cricket Club.

== Cricketer ==
Abbott made a single first-class appearance for Surrey against the Marylebone Cricket Club at Lord's in 1844. The Marylebone Cricket Club made 80 in their first-innings, with Surrey making 58 in response, during which Abbott scored 2 runs before he was dismissed by William Lillywhite. The Marylebone Cricket Club made 52 in their second-innings, with Surrey chasing down their target of 75 with three wickets to spare. Abbott wasn't required to bat in Surrey's second-innings. Abbott's batting style is unknown. This was his only major appearance for Surrey.
