= William Searle =

William Searle may refer to:

- William Searle (cricketer) (1796–1837), English cricketer
- William George Searle (1829–1913), British historian

== See also ==
- Billy Searle, rugby player
- William Searle Holdsworth, English legal historian
