= John Peto =

John Peto may refer to:

- John F. Peto, American trompe-l'œil painter
- John Peto (politician), British politician
- John Peto (cricketer), English cricketer
