= Broadbridge =

Broadbridge may refer to:

- Broadbridge (surname)
- Baron Broadbridge, title in the Peerage of the United Kingdom
- Broadbridge Heath, village in West Sussex, England
- Broadbridge, West Sussex, a settlement in Bosham civil parish
