= Joseph Dennis (cricketer) =

English cricketer (1779–1831)

Joseph Dennis (born c. December 1778 and christened 6 January 1779 in Nottingham; died 16 November 1831 in Nottingham) was an English first-class cricketer who played for Nottingham Cricket Club from 1800 to 1829.

== Career ==
A batsman and occasional wicket-keeper, Dennis took part in seven first-class matches for Nottingham, mostly against Sheffield Cricket Club. He also played against Hampshire and, in 1826, he captained Nottingham against a combined Sheffield and Leicester team. At forty-seven, he was the oldest man on his side.

Dennis retired from cricket after the 1828 season because of failing vision, but he was a popular man and, in 1829, he gave in to public pressure and agreed to stage a two-match come-back.

== Private life ==
Dennis was landlord of the Eclipse Inn at Chapel Bar in Nottingham and had a reputation for gambling: in 1815, he laid £120 on a local match and won.

On 16 November 1831, Dennis suffered a stroke while in the Bell Inn and was carried by its landlord, Mr Clarke, back to the Eclipse, where he died shortly afterwards, only a month after the death of his wife. Nottinghamshire author John Frost Sutton observed that "his name lived on in the memories of thousands".

== Sources ==
- Arthur Haygarth, Scores & Biographies, Volumes 1–2 (1744–1840), Lillywhite, 1862
- F. S. Ashley-Cooper: Nottinghamshire Cricket and Cricketers (H.B. Saxton, 1923).
- John Frost Sutton: The Date-Book of Remarkable and Memorable Events Connected with Nottingham and its Neighbourhood: 1750-1850 (Simpkin & Marshall, 1852).
- John Frost Sutton: Nottingham Cricket Matches from 1771 to 1853 (Simpkin & Marshall, 1853).
