= George Millyard =

English cricketer

George Millyard (12 November 1814 – 20 July 1848) was an English professional cricketer who played from 1835 to 1842. He was a cousin of his Sussex colleagues Jem and William Broadbridge.

A left-handed batsman, occasional wicket-keeper and right arm medium pace roundarm bowler who was mainly associated with Sussex, he made 50 known appearances. He was playing for Sussex when the county club was founded in 1839. He represented the Players in the Gentlemen v Players series and the South in the North v. South series.

== Bibliography ==
- Haygarth, Arthur (1996) [1862]. Scores & Biographies, Volume 1 (1744–1826). Kennington: Frederick Lillywhite. ISBN 978-19-00592-23-9.
- Haygarth, Arthur (1997) [1862]. Scores & Biographies, Volume 2 (1827–1840). Kennington: Frederick Lillywhite. ISBN 978-19-00592-23-9.
