= Will Buckingham =

English novelist

Will Buckingham (born 28 September 1971) is a novelist, non-fiction writer, and philosopher.

Born in Norfolk, his education includes a master's degree in anthropology from Durham (1997) and a PhD in philosophy from Staffordshire University (2007).

Buckingham has held various academic posts including Reader in Writing and Creativity at De Montfort University, Visiting Associate Professor at Sichuan University, and Visiting Professor of Global Cultures at the Parami Institute, Yangon. He is currently Professor of Social Sciences and Humanities at Parami University, Yangon.

Buckingham's PhD research focused on the work of Emmanuel Levinas, and he has published on Levinas in Levinas, Storytelling and Anti-Storytelling (Bloomsbury Academic, 2013). Philosophical and anthropological themes often appear in his other writing, for example, a concern with questions of otherness and hospitality. These themes are explored in his book Stealing with the Eyes (Haus Publications, 2018), which describes his experience doing anthropological research in the Tanimbar Islands, Southeast Maluku, Indonesia. Buckingham's non-fiction book, Hello, Stranger: Stories of Connection in a Divided World, published by Granta Books in 2021, develops questions around the ideas of otherness and of the stranger. This book was selected in 2021 to be a BBC Radio4 Book of the Week, broadcast in serialised form across the UK.

Buckingham also writes philosophy for a popular market. He was a lead writer for Dorling Kindersley, contributing to their globally bestselling The Philosophy Books: Big Ideas, Simply Explained, and he has worked on a number of other philosophy projects with the same publisher. His book A Practical Guide to Happiness: Think Deeply and Flourish was published by Icon / Totem Books in 2012, and reissued in 2022.

Buckingham also writes fiction for children. His first novel, Cargo Fever (Tindal Street Press 2008), was set on a fictional island in Southeast Maluku. An interest in the I-Ching led him to learn Chinese, travel to China, and write a novel, Sixty-Four Chance Pieces (Earnshaw Books 2015), that consisted of sixty-four short stories inspired by the sixty-four hexagrams. His novel, The Descent of the Lyre (Roman Books 2012), was shortlisted for the East Midlands Book Award. Buckingham has written a picture book, The Snorgh and the Sailor, which was shortlisted for the Coventry Inspiration Book Awards, 2013, and a middle-grade novel, Lucy and the Rocket Dog (Knopf 2018).

As well as writing, Buckingham is a translator and has translated from both Mandarin and Taiwanese Hokkien. He was co-editor and translator for the short story collection Tâigael: Stories from Taiwanese and Gaelic (Wind&Bones Books 2025), a collection of new fiction in translation between minoritised languages. Tâigael was featured in a special issue of Taiwan Insight magazine from the University of Nottingham Taiwan Research Hub. He has undertaken literary residencies worldwide, including at the Taiwan Literature Base, and at the Sofia Literature and Translation House in Bulgaria.

Buckingham is currently based in between Taiwan and Scotland, where he continues to teach at Parami University, and co-directs the publishing house Wind&Bones Books.

== Bibliography ==
=== Non-fiction ===
- Hello Stranger. Granta, 2021.
- Stealing with the Eyes. Haus Publishing, 2018.
- Teach Yourself: Complete Write a Novel Course. Hodder & Stoughton, 2015.
- Levinas, Storytelling and Anti-Storytelling. Bloomsbury Academic, 2013.
- A Practical Guide to Happiness: Think Deeply and Flourish. Published by Icon / Totem Books in 2012.
- The Philosophy Book. Dorling Kindersley, 2010.
- Finding Our Sea-Legs: Ethics, Experience and the Ocean of Stories. Kingston University Press, 2009.

=== Fiction ===
- Sixty-Four Chance Pieces. Earnshaw Books, 2015.
- Goat Music. Roman Books, 2015.
- The Descent of the Lyre. Roman Books, 2012.
- Cargo Fever. Tindal Street Press, 2007.

=== Children's fiction ===
- Lucy and the Rocket Dog. Knopf, 2015/2017.
- The Snorgh and the Sailor. Alison Green books, 2012.
