= Edward Leathes =

English cricketer and army officer

Edward Leathes (10 February 1801 – 11 February 1871) was an English army officer and cricketer.

Leathes was born in Bury St Edmunds, Suffolk, the fifth son of George Leathes of the 1st Royal Dragoons, and his wife Mary Moore; Venn gives the year of birth as 1797. His brothers included John Francis Leathes of Herringfleet Hall, and the Rev. Frederick Leathes, Rector of Reedham. He was educated at Bury St Edmunds Grammar School, and matriculated at Christ's College, Cambridge in 1815, where he kept just three terms. He became a Lieutenant in the 1st Royal Dragoons, having joined as a cornet in 1816. His father died in 1817.

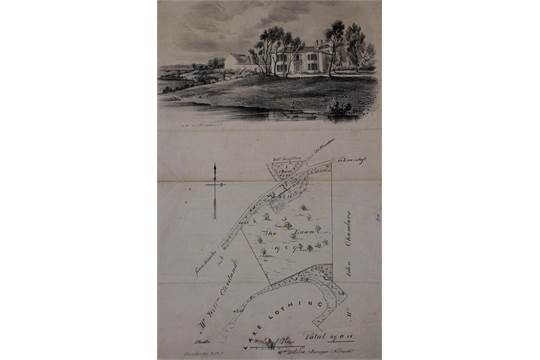
Normanston Court, on Lake Lothing, 1830 lithograph

Leathes bought Normanston(e) Hall, south-west of Lowestoft, in 1832. He died 11 February 1871 at Normanston, and was buried at Herringfleet.

Leathes was a cricketer with amateur status who was associated with Suffolk and made his debut in 1830.

Leathes married in 1823 Eliza Mary Galloway, daughter of John Galloway of Exeter. They had six sons and four daughters. The youngest son, Philip, of the Suffolk Regiment, later resided at Normanston Hall.

== Bibliography ==
- Haygarth, Arthur (1996) [1862]. Scores & Biographies, Volume 1 (1744–1826). Kennington: Frederick Lillywhite. ISBN 978-19-00592-23-9.
- Haygarth, Arthur (1997) [1862]. Scores & Biographies, Volume 2 (1827–1840). Kennington: Frederick Lillywhite. ISBN 978-19-00592-23-9.
