= William Abbott (cricketer) =

English cricketer (1856–1935)

Personal information
- Born: 28 October 1856; Walton-on-Thames, Surrey, England
- Died: 22 December 1935 (aged 79); Woking, Surrey, England
- Batting: Unknown
- Role: Wicket-keeper
- Relatives: Charles Abbott (father)

Domestic team information
- Years: Team
- 1877: Surrey

Career statistics
Competition	First-class
Matches	3
Runs scored	9
Batting average	1.80
100s/50s	–/–
Top score	5
Balls bowled	–
Wickets	–
Bowling average	–
5 wickets in innings	–
10 wickets in match	–
Best bowling	–
Catches/stumpings	7/2
- Source: Cricinfo, 8 January 2012

William Abbott (28 October 1856 – 22 December 1935) was an English first-class cricketer. Abbott's batting style is unknown, though it is known he fielded as a wicket-keeper. He was born at Walton-on-Thames, Surrey, and educated at Winchester College.

Abbott made his first-class debut for Surrey against Gloucestershire in 1877. He made two further first-class appearances for the county in that season against Middlesex and Yorkshire. He scored a total of 9 runs in his three matches, which came at an average of 1.80, with a high score of 5. Behind the stumps, he took 7 catches and made 2 stumpings.

He died at Woking, Surrey on 22 December 1935. His father, Charles, played a single first-class match for Surrey before the formation of the county cricket club.
