= John Brown (cricketer, born 1820) =

English cricketer

Personal information
- Full name: John Brown
- Born: 22 March 1820; Warblington, Hampshire, England
- Relatives: George Brown (father); George Brown, Jr. (brother)

Domestic team information
- Years: Team
- 1849: Hampshire

Career statistics
Competition	First-class
Matches	1
Runs scored	9
Batting average	4.50
100s/50s	–/–
Top score	8
Catches/stumpings	–/–
- Source: Cricinfo, 26 April 2010

John Brown (22 March 1820 – date of death unknown) was an English cricketer. Brown's batting and bowling styles are unknown. He was born at Warblington, Hampshire.

Brown represented Hampshire in a single first-class match in 1849 against an All England Eleven. In this match he scored a single run in the Hampshire first-innings, before being dismissed by William Hillyer. In Hampshire's second-innings he scored 8 runs, before being dismissed by the same bowler.

His father, George, also played first-class cricket for Hampshire and Sussex. His brother, George, played first-class cricket for Sussex. Brown's date and place of death are unknown.
