= Massey's Folly =

Building in Farringdon, Hampshire, England

Coordinates: 51.1132°N 0.9845°W

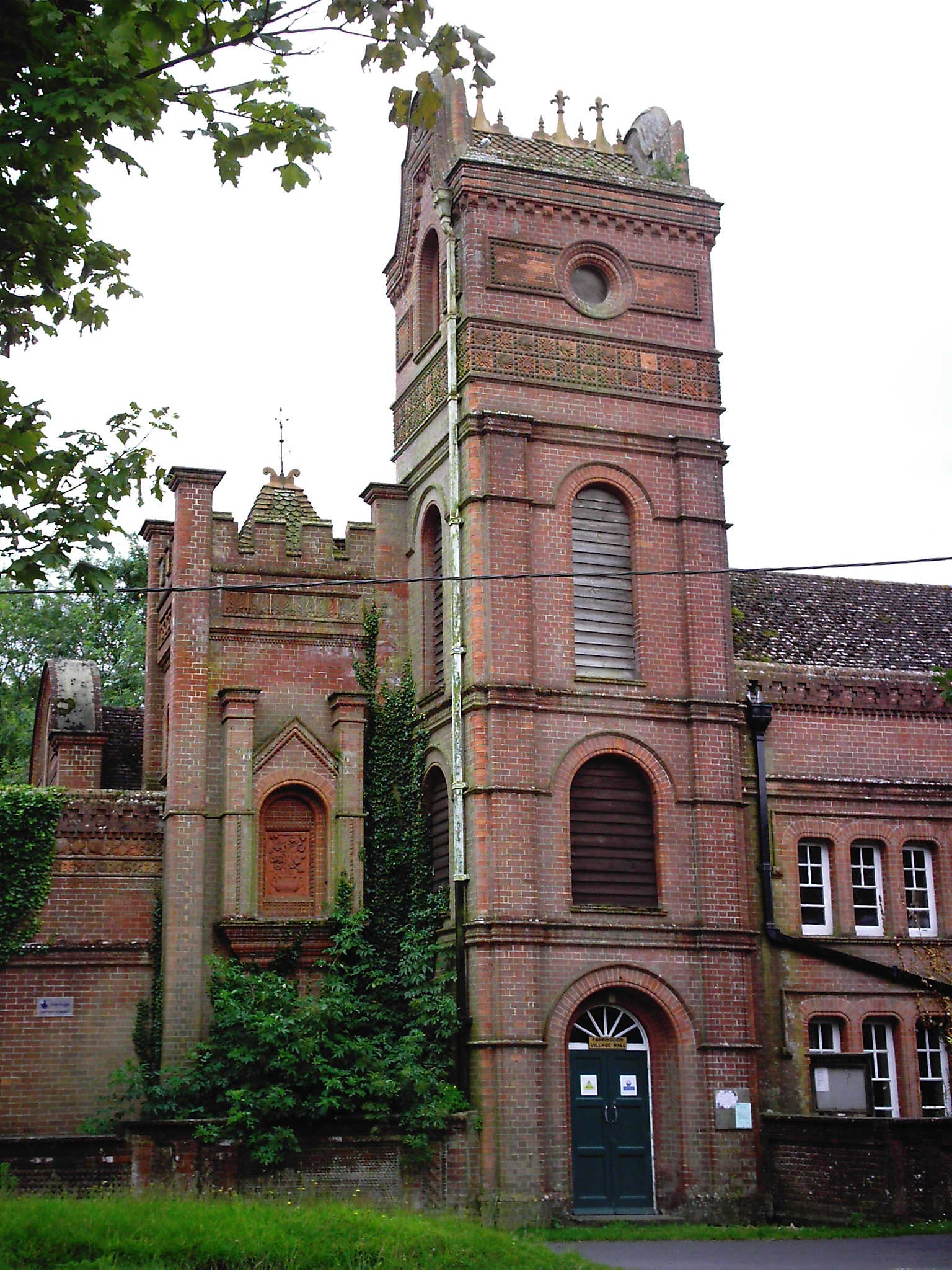
Massey's Folly

Massey's Folly, a grade II listed building, was built by Thomas Hacket Massey who served as rector in Farringdon village in Hampshire for 62 years. The folly took thirty years to build as it was entirely built by Massey along with a single bricklayer. Further delays were due to Massey occasionally demolishing completed parts of the structure and making further additions. It has seventeen bedrooms and two towers. Its purpose is unknown, but from 1925 it was used as a primary school (closed 1987) and a village hall (closed 2015). Massey, who died in 1919, is buried just outside the church porch.

In 2006 the folly received National Lottery Heritage Funding and featured on the BBC's Restoration programme.

In 2015 Massey's Folly was sold for development as residential units, although final development was delayed, with revised applications for planning permission continuing in 2024.
