= Charles Broadbridge =

English cricketer

Charles Broadbridge (christened 17 December 1798; died July 1841) was an English cricketer who played for Sussex. He was born and died in Duncton.

Broadbridge made a single first-class appearance, in 1838, against Marylebone Cricket Club. Batting in the lower-middle order, Broadbridge scored one run in the first innings and a duck in the second innings, partnering William Lillywhite, whose nephew James Lillywhite played in the first ever Test match.
