= John Broadbridge =

English cricketer

Personal information
- Full name: John Broadbridge
- Born: Unknown
- Died: Unknown
- Batting: Unknown

Career statistics
Competition	First-class
Matches	1
Runs scored	5
Batting average	2.50
100s/50s	–/–
Top score	5
Balls bowled	–
Wickets	–
Bowling average	–
5 wickets in innings	–
10 wickets in match	–
Best bowling	–
Catches/stumpings	1/–
- Source: Cricinfo, 15 June 2013

John Broadbridge (dates of birth and death unknown) was an English cricketer. Broadbridge's batting style is unknown.

Broadbridge made a single first-class appearance for a team of left-handed players against the Marylebone Cricket Club at Lord's Cricket Ground in 1838. In a match which the Marylebone Cricket Club won by an innings and 159 runs, Broadbridge opened the batting, with him being run out for a duck in the Left-Handed first-innings, while in their second-innings he was also run out, this time scoring 5 runs.
