= John Willes (cricketer) =

English cricketer (1778–1852)

Personal information
- Full name: John Willes
- Born: 1778; Headcorn, Kent
- Died: 5 August 1852 (aged 73–74); The Moat, Staunton, Worcestershire (Note: Although Staunton is in Gloucestershire, The Moat, the house where Willes died, is in Worcestershire.)
- Batting: Right-handed
- Bowling: Right-arm medium

Domestic team information
- Years: Team
- 1806–1822: Kent

John Willes (1778 – 5 August 1852) was an English cricketer who played for Kent as a fast bowler. Despite only playing five important matches, he had a significant impact on the game's history and development for his "pivotal" role in the development of roundarm bowling.

== Early life ==
Willes was born at Headcorn in Kent in 1778 and christened at Hollingbourne on 17 August. He was the son of John and Sarah Willes and became a prominent landowner in Kent and Sussex. He lived for much of his life at Sutton Valence. His sister Christiana Willes was also a cricketer and is sometimes attributed as the founder of Roundarm bowling, though the style was originated by Tom Walker.

== Cricket career ==
Willes played for the Gentlemen in the first two Gentlemen v Players matches in 1806.

=== Roundarm bowling ===
Arthur Haygarth wrote in Scores & Biographies that Willes was "...the originator, or rather the reviver, of round-armed bowling," and is said (though his daughter has never heard of the fact) to have caught the idea from seeing his sister deliver the ball to him in practice when he was unwell. The Cricket Field, however, speaking through William Beldham, states: Willes was not the inventor of that kind of round bowling—he only revived what was forgotten or new to the young folk. Whether he bowled round in the present match, cannot now be said, as this kind of delivery was not tolerated till about 1827, when it was permanently established by William Lillywhite, Jem Broadbridge and George T Knight.

In the Marylebone Cricket Club (MCC) v Kent match on 15 July 1822, Willes commenced playing for his county but, being no-balled, he threw down the ball in high dudgeon, left the ground immediately, and was said to never play again. Mr Willes was also a great sportsman, and kept a pack of hounds at Sutton. This place, shortly before his death, he was obliged to leave, and he removed to Staunton, near Gloucester, where he died, in fearfully reduced circumstances on 5 August 1852, aged 74. No tombstone has been erected to his memory".

In fact, as Beldham confirmed, roundarm bowling was first devised back in Hambledon days by bowlers such as Tom Walker, although he was barred from using it in matches by the club.

After Willes quit the game, his cause was taken up by Knight in particular and the style was used to great effect by Lillywhite and Broadbridge who were generally recognised as the two best bowlers in England during the 1820s. Roundarm was the subject of trial matches in 1827 but not actually legalised until 1835, though in the meantime the umpires turned a blind eye.

== Bibliography ==
- Carlaw, Derek (2020). Kent County Cricketers, A to Z: Part One (1806–1914) (PDF). Cardiff: ACS.
