= George Brown (cricketer, born 1821) =

English cricketer (1821–1875)

Personal information
- Full name: George Grainger Brown
- Born: 16 June 1821; Brighton, Sussex, England
- Died: 21 March 1875 (aged 53); Battersea, Surrey, England
- Batting: Right-handed
- Bowling: Underarm (unknown style)
- Relatives: George Brown (father); John Brown (brother)

Domestic team information
- Years: Team
- 1851–1858: Sussex

Career statistics
Competition	First-class
Matches	46
Runs scored	898
Batting average	13.20
100s/50s	–/4
Top score	86
Balls bowled	700
Wickets	35
Bowling average	14.51
5 wickets in innings	3
10 wickets in match	–
Best bowling	5/25
Catches/stumpings	18/–
- Source: Cricinfo, 8 July 2013

George Grainger Brown (16 June 1821 – 21 March 1875) was an English cricketer active in the 1850s, making over forty appearances in first-class cricket. Born at Brighton, Sussex, Brown was a right-handed batsman and an underarm bowler, who played for several first-class cricket teams.

== Career ==
The son of the cricketer George Brown, Brown made his first-class debut for Sussex against Kent at Hove in 1851, with him making a further three first-class appearances for the county in that season. In his first four matches, Brown scored 213 runs at an average of 43.60, with two half centuries and a high score of 61. In the following season, he made six first-class appearances, though was less successful than in his debut season, scoring 186 runs at an average of 17.00, with a high score of 86 against Surrey, which was to be the highest score of his first-class career. In 1853, Brown made his first first-class appearance of the season for the United England Eleven (UEE) against Yorkshire at Hyde Park Ground, Sheffield. He also made three appearances for Sussex in this season, against the Marylebone Cricket Club, England, and Nottinghamshire, as well as making a second appearance for the UEE against the Gentlemen of England. However, Brown struggled for form in 1853, scoring just 22 runs and averaging 3.14 from eight innings.

Following on from three appearances for Sussex at the start of the 1854 season, Brown was selected to play for the South in the annual North v South, a match in which he took career best bowling figures by taking 5/25. He made three further appearances in that season for Sussex against England, the UEE and Surrey, as well as making a single first-class appearance for England against Nottinghamshire. In his eight first-class matches in 1854, Brown scored 228 runs at an average of 17.53, with a high score of 55, while in what was his first season of bowling in first-class cricket, he also took 15 wickets at a bowling average of 9.05, with two five wicket hauls. His second five wicket haul came against Surrey and equalled his 5/25 taken earlier in the season for the South. His first match of the 1855 season for an All England Eleven against Surrey, with him also making a further seven first-class appearances for Sussex in that season, as well as playing for the South against the North. Brown scored 135 runs in 1855, averaging 10.38 and top scoring with 35.

In the following season, Brown made six first-class appearances for Sussex, as well as playing a single match each for a combined Kent and Sussex team against England, and for the South against the North at Salford. He struggled with the bat in 1856, scoring 66 runs at the low average of 5.50, while having bowled little in the previous season, Brown took 13 wickets in 1856, averaging 15.84, and taking best figures of 5/63, made against Kent. He made just two first-class appearances for Sussex in 1857, against Surrey at The Oval, and Kent at Gravesend. Brown's final season in first-class cricket came in 1858, with him making four first-class appearances for Sussex, the last of which came against Kent at the Tunbridge Wells. In total, Brown made 46 appearances in first-class cricket, 37 of which came for Sussex. For Sussex, he scored 772 runs at an average of 13.54, making four half centuries with a high score of 86. As a bowler, he took 19 wickets for Sussex, averaging 17.36 apiece for each wicket, with two five wicket hauls. In his three matches for the South he took 10 wickets, averaging 9.60, while making a single five wicket haul.

In addition to his father being a first-class cricketer, Brown's brother John was also a first-class cricketer. He died at Battersea, Surrey on 21 March 1875.
