= William Ashby (cricketer) =

English cricketer

Personal information
- Born: 12 January 1786; Linton, Kent, England
- Died: 10 April 1847 (aged 61); Lambeth, Surrey, England
- Batting: Right-handed
- Bowling: Right-arm slow
- Role: Bowler

Domestic team information
- Years: Team
- 1807–1829: Kent

William Ashby (12 January 1786 – 10 April 1847) was an English cricketer who played mainly for Kent. He was one of the best slow bowlers of his time, and a pioneer of roundarm bowling.

Ashby was born in 1786 at Linton, Kent, the son of Thomas and Frances Ashby. He was a carpenter by trade who worked on the Sutton Valence estate of John Willes, a Kent landowner and cricketer and an influential proponent of the roundarm method of bowling in the early 19th century. (Note: Roundarm bowling involves delivering the ball from below the level of the shoulder. At the time Ashby and Willes began to play, the normal form of delivery was underarm bowling, either rolling or pitching the ball. Roundarm bowling, which gave the bowler an advantage, was specifically outlawed in 1816. Although Willes is often credited with the invention of the roundarm style, it had been in use since at least the 1780s, although it had been outlawed at the time by the Hambledon Club, an influential cricket club based in Hampshire.) Ashby already had a reputation as a fine cricketer and is first known to have played for the county team in 1807 alongside Willes, developing a reputation as the best slow bowler in Kent. Scores and Biographies described Ashby's bowling action as "not very high in delivery" and with what it described as an "unusual bias", although William Denison writing in 1846 in his Sketches of the Players, records that his bowling action later saw his arm raised above his elbow.

Later in 1807 Ashby made his debut, playing for England (i.e., the "rest" of England). He went on to make 45 appearances, most of them for Kent or England. He also appeared for Hampshire, Sussex, Surrey, and Marylebone Cricket Club (MCC). He played nine times for the Players against the Gentlemen. He played in the 1822 Kent match against MCC at Lord's when Lord Frederick Beauclerk, a leading MCC member, contrived to have Willes no-balled for throwing in an attempt to have roundarm bowling outlawed. (Note: Beauclerk was a leading opponent of roundarm bowling.) Willes famously left the match although Ashby, whose bowling action was probably lower than Willes', continued to play. He also played in one of the roundarm trial matches of 1827 and was one of the signatories of the petition against the way that the Sussex bowlers in the matches had bowled.

Ashby played his last important match in 1830, but continued to play club cricket. He was employed as a professional at the Clarence Cricket Club in Camberwell in 1836 and played there for 10 years.

Ashby married Sarah Whatson in 1819 and had two children, a son and a daughter. He died of bronchitis at Lambeth in 1847 aged 61.

== Bibliography ==
- Birley, Derek (1999). A Social History of English Cricket. London: Aurum Press. ISBN 978-18-54107-10-7 – via Internet Archive.
- Carlaw, Derek (2020). Kent County Cricketers, A to Z: Part One (1806–1914) (PDF). Cardiff: ACS.
- Denison William (1846). Sketches of the Players. London: Simpkin, Marshall & Co. (Available online at Google Books. Retrieved 2022-04-08.)
- Moore, Dudley (1998). The History of Kent County Cricket Club. London: Christopher Helm. ISBN 978-07-47022-09-1.
- Rendell, B. and Booth, K. (2010). Fuller Pilch: A Straightforward Man. Nottingham: The Association of Cricket Statisticians and Historians. ISBN 9781905138975
