= Edward Thwaites (cricketer) =

English cricketer

Personal information
- Born: 4 October 1801; Staplehurst, Kent
- Died: 18 January 1872 (aged 70); Hastings, Sussex

Domestic team information
- Years: Team
- 1825–1826: Kent
- 1826–1837: Sussex

Edward Thwaites (4 October 1801 – 18 January 1872) was an English professional cricketer who played between 1825 and 1837. He played in 25 important matches, including for the Players in 1827.

Thwaites was born at Staplehurst in Kent in 1801, the son of Stephen and Mary (née Simmons) Thwaites. He was a member of Hawkhurst Cricket Club (Note: The Hawkhurst club was one of the strongest in Kent between 1800 and 1830 and regularly challenged Kent county teams during this period.) and made his debut for Kent against Sussex, playing in a pair of matches organised by the club in 1825, one at Brighton and the other at Hawkhurst Moor. He played a single match for England (i.e., the "rest" of England) later in the year.

The following year Thwaites played for an England before playing for Sussex in July and then for Kent in a repeat of the pair of matches against Sussex in August. (Note: Both these matches and those in 1825 were made up to Kent organised by the Hawkhurst club.) Thwaites played regularly for Sussex between 1827 and 1829, making nine appearances for the team, including playing in all three roundarm trial matches in 1827. He was chosen to play for the Players in the 1827 Gentlemen v Players match and played in other matches for East Sussex, but was not selected for the county team after 1829 until 1836 when he played for Sussex against Marylebone Cricket Club (MCC) at Lord's.

Thwaites made a further six appearances for the team between 1835 and 1837, his final important match coming in August 1837 against MCC at Brighton. A total of 19 of his 25 important matches were for Sussex. In these, he scored 397 runs with a highest score of 37 not out, made for Sussex against England at Sheffield in 1827.

Thwaites worked as a tallow chandler in Hastings. He married Mary Standen in the town in 1833; the couple had eight children. Thwaites died at Hastings in 1872. He was aged 70.

== Bibliography ==
- Carlaw, Derek (2020). Kent County Cricketers, A to Z: Part One (1806–1914) (PDF). Cardiff: ACS.
- Lewis, Paul (2014). For Kent and Country. Eastbourne: Reveille Press. ISBN 978-19-08336-63-7.
