= Cemetry Road =

Former cricket ground

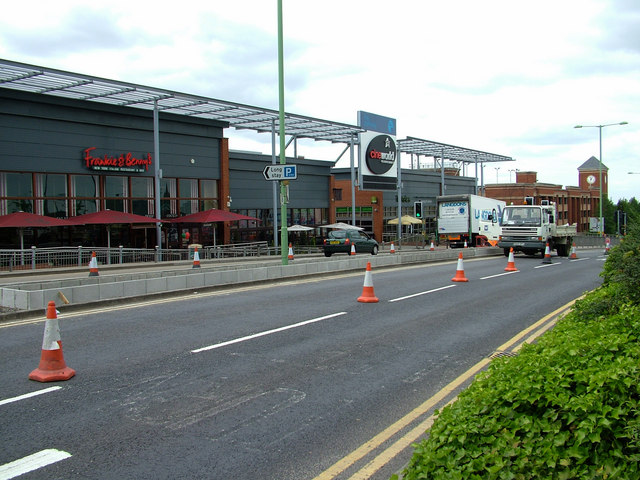
- Modern day view of the location of the ground
- Interactive map of Cemetry Road

Ground information
- Location: Bury St Edmunds, Suffolk
- Country: England
- Coordinates: 52.2457°N 0.7070°E
- Establishment: 1827 (first recorded match)

Team information
Suffolk	(1830, 1847)
Suffolk	(1904–1914)
- As of 14 August 2010; Source: Ground profile

Cemetry Road was a cricket ground in Bury St Edmunds, Suffolk. The ground was known as Field Lane from 1826 to 1854 and was later known as the West Suffolk Cricket Ground. Today, the location of the ground would be along King's Road in Bury St Edmunds, with the stretch of the A1302 named Parkway bisecting the site.

== History ==
The first recorded match on the ground was in 1827, when the Suffolk played the Marylebone Cricket Club. The ground held two first-class matches, the first in 1830 when Suffolk played the Marylebone Cricket Club and in 1847 when Suffolk played the same opposition. After many decades of use by Suffolk, the ground hosted its first Minor Counties Championship match in 1904 when Suffolk played Cambridgeshire. From 1902 to 1914, the ground hosted eight Minor Counties Championship matches, the last of which saw Suffolk play Lincolnshire. It switched from being a cricket ground to a football ground during World War II, with Bury Town playing there until 1976. The ground is no longer in existence, having been built over.

== Records ==
=== First-class ===
- Highest team total: 159 by Marylebone Cricket Club v Suffolk, 1847
- Lowest team total: 42 by Suffolk v Marylebone Cricket Club, 1847
- Highest individual innings: 60 by Henry Royston for Marylebone Cricket Club v Suffolk, 1847
- Best bowling in an innings: 7-? by Jemmy Dean for Marylebone Cricket Club v Suffolk, 1847
- Best bowling in a match: 11-? by Jemmy Dean, as above

== See also ==
- List of cricket grounds in England and Wales
