= Henry Beagley =

English cricketer

Henry Beagley (7 January 1805 – ?) was an English professional cricketer who played from 1825 to 1833. He was a brother of Thomas and John Beagley. He was an occasional wicket-keeper who was mainly associated with Hampshire. He made 6 known appearances in important matches including 3 for The Bs from 1825 to 1832.

== Bibliography ==
- Haygarth, Arthur (1996) [1862]. Scores & Biographies, Volume 1 (1744–1826). Kennington: Frederick Lillywhite. ISBN 978-19-00592-23-9.
- Haygarth, Arthur (1997) [1862]. Scores & Biographies, Volume 2 (1827–1840). Kennington: Frederick Lillywhite. ISBN 978-19-00592-23-9.
