= James Dale (cricketer) =

English cricketer

James Dale (6 March 1789 – 31 December 1828) was an English professional cricketer who played from 1823 to 1827. He was mainly associated with Sussex and made 9 known appearances in important matches.

== Bibliography ==
- Haygarth, Arthur (1996) [1862]. Scores & Biographies, Volume 1 (1744–1826). Kennington: Frederick Lillywhite. ISBN 978-19-00592-23-9.
- Haygarth, Arthur (1997) [1862]. Scores & Biographies, Volume 2 (1827–1840). Kennington: Frederick Lillywhite. ISBN 978-19-00592-23-9.
