= William Buckingham (cricketer) =

English cricketer

Personal information
- Full name: William Buckingham
- Born: 4 January 1798; Uxbridge, Middlesex, England
- Died: Unknown
- Batting: Right-handed

Career statistics
Competition	First-class
Matches	3
Runs scored	76
Batting average	19.00
100s/50s	0/0
Top score	40*
Catches/stumpings	0/–
- Source: Cricinfo, 15 June 2013

William Buckingham (4 January 1798 – date of death unknown) was an English cricketer. Buckingham was a right-handed batsman. He was born at Uxbridge, Middlesex.

Buckingham made his first-class debut for a team of right-handed players in the Left-Handed v Right-Handed fixture in 1835 at Lord's Cricket Ground. He made two further appearances in first-class cricket, playing for the Players in the Gentlemen v Players fixture of 1835, before making his third appearance for England against Kent and Sussex in 1836. Buckingham scored a total of 76 runs in his three appearances, at an average of 19.00 and a high score of 40 not out.
