= John Peto (cricketer) =

English cricketer

Personal information
- Born: 1810; Godalming, Surrey, England
- Died: 22 February 1874 (aged 63–64); Guildford, Surrey, England
- Role: Wicket-keeper
- Relatives: William Peto (brother)

Domestic team information
- Years: Team
- 1847: Surrey

Career statistics
| Competition | First-class |
|---|---|
| Matches | 1 |
| Runs scored | 12 |
| Batting average | 12.00 |
| 100s/50s | 0/0 |
| Top score | 7 |
| Catches/stumpings | 0/1 |
- Source: Cricinfo, 14 January 2012

John Peto (1810 – 22 February 1874) was an English cricketer. Peto's batting style is unknown, though it is known he fielded as a wicket-keeper. He was christened at Godalming, Surrey on 26 December 1810.

Peto made a single first-class appearance for Surrey against the Marylebone Cricket Club at The Oval in 1847. He was dismissed in Surrey's first-innings total of 197 for 7 runs by William Hillyer, with the Marylebone Cricket Club making 91 all out in response to that total. Forced to follow-on, the Marylebone Cricket Club made 216, with Peto taking his only stumping of the match when he stumped Samuel Dakin off the bowling of Nicholas Felix. Chasing 110 for victory, Surrey were dismissed nine runs short of their target, with Peto ending the innings not out on 5.

He died at Guildford, Surrey on 22 February 1874. His brother William Peto also played first-class cricket.
