= Thomas Pierpoint =

English cricketer

Thomas Pierpoint (15 September 1789 – 12 June 1849) was an English professional cricketer who played from 1827 to 1833. He was mainly associated with Sussex and made 9 known appearances.

== Bibliography ==
- Haygarth, Arthur (1996) [1862]. Scores & Biographies, Volume 1 (1744–1826). Kennington: Frederick Lillywhite. ISBN 978-19-00592-23-9.
- Haygarth, Arthur (1997) [1862]. Scores & Biographies, Volume 2 (1827–1840). Kennington: Frederick Lillywhite. ISBN 978-19-00592-23-9.
