= Parami University =

Parami University is a private liberal arts university based in Yangon, Myanmar that offers online undergraduate programs. The institution was established in 2017 as the Parami Institute of Liberal Arts and Sciences in and later expanded into an online university offering bachelor's degree programs.

== History ==
Parami Institute of Liberal Arts and Sciences began as an educational initiative focused on liberal arts and sciences. Following the 2021 Myanmar coup, the institution transitioned to an online learning model and expended its undergrduate programs.

In 2022, the university received a license from the District of Columbia Higher Education Licensure Commission (HELC) and began offering bachelor's degree programs in the same year. Parami University awarded its first dual Bachelor of Arts degrees, jointly with Bard College, on June 9, 2026.

In October 2024, Parami University became an engaged member of the Talloires Network of Engaged Universities, an international coalition of higer education institutions committed to civic engagedent, social responsibility, and addressing local and global challenges.

In June 2026, Parami University's student-led program, Project Luminary, received first place and a $10,000 grant in the MacJannet Prize for Global Citizenship, awarded by the Tallories Network of Engaged Universities. Established in 2023, the initiative provides free educational programs, skill training, and university application guidance to youth affected by the 2021 military coup in Myanmar.

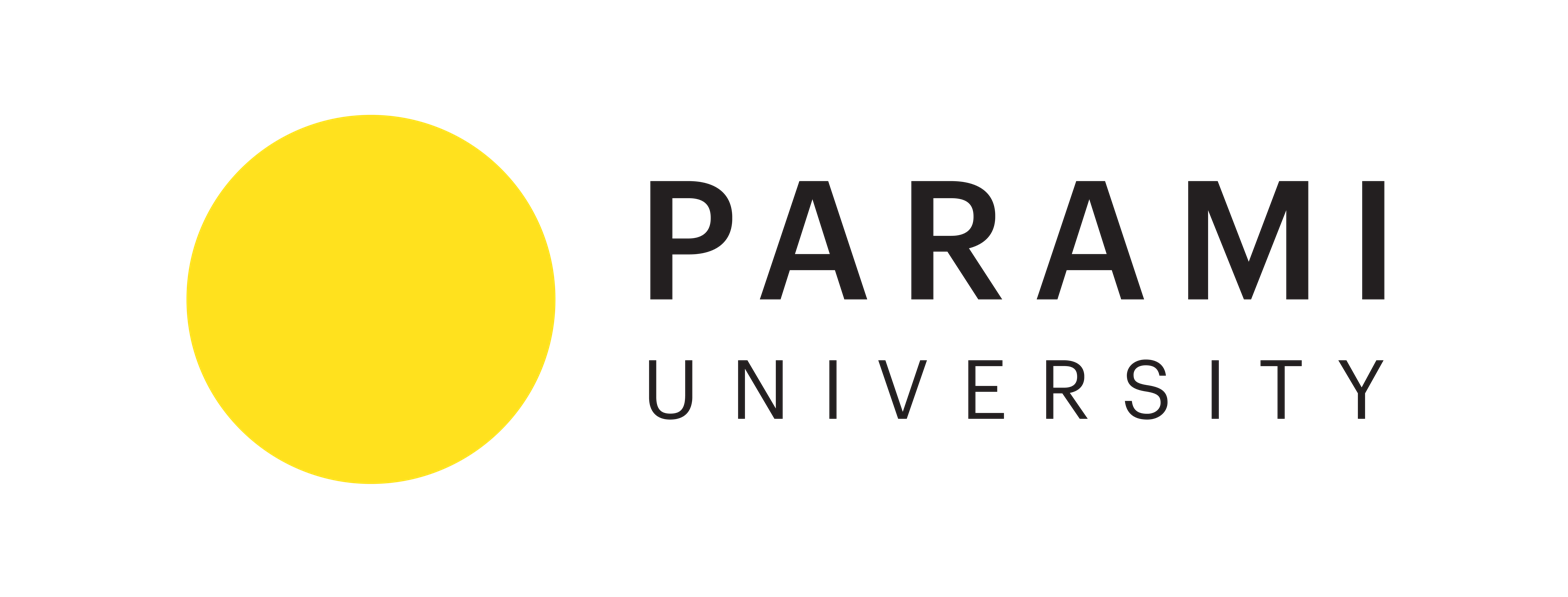
Parami University Logo

== Academics ==
Parami University offers an Associate in Arts in Liberal Arts and Sciences and Bachelor of Arts programs in Philosophy, Politics and Economics, and Statistics and Data Science.
