= James Adams (cricketer, born 1811) =

English cricketer

Personal information
- Full name: James Adams
- Born: 15 January 1811; Saffron Walden, Essex
- Died: 7 November 1851 (aged 40); Saffron Walden, Essex
- Role: Occasional wicket-keeper

Domestic team information
- Years: Team
- 1830: Suffolk
- 1830: Cambridge Town Club

Career statistics
Competition	First-class
Matches	4
Runs scored	96
Batting average	19.20
100s/50s	0/1
Top score	62
Catches/stumpings	2/–
- Source: Cricinfo, 23 January 2013

James Adams (15 January 1811 – 7 November 1851) was an English first-class cricketer. Adams' batting style is unknown, while it is known he occasionally played as a wicket-keeper. He was born at Saffron Walden, Essex.

Adams made his first-class cricket debut for Cambridge Town Club against Cambridge University in May 1830 at the University Ground, Barnwell, where he made 62 runs in Cambridge Town Club's first-innings. He played for the Players in June of that year in the Gentlemen v Players fixture at Lord's Cricket Ground, before making two further first-class appearances for Suffolk, both against the Marylebone Cricket Club in June and August. In his four first-class matches, Adams scored 96 runs at an average of 19.20.

He died at the town of his birth on 7 November 1851.
