= William Mathews (cricketer) =

English cricketer

William Mathews (born 23 March 1793 at Crondall, Hampshire; died 20 August 1858 at Woodbridge, Suffolk) was an English professional cricketer who played from 1821 to 1830. He was mainly associated with Surrey and made 31 known appearances.

Mathews took part in the Gentlemen v Players matches between 1824 and 1830, usually representing the Players, but in 1825, he was a given man for the Gentlemen. He played for England in the 1827 roundarm trial matches and was one of the signatories to the petition after the second game that called upon the authorities to ban roundarm.

== Bibliography ==
- H S Altham, A History of Cricket, Volume 1 (to 1914), George Allen & Unwin, 1926
- Arthur Haygarth, Scores & Biographies, Volumes 1-2 (1744–1840), Lillywhite, 1862
