= Richard Searle (Queensland cricketer) =

Australian cricketer (1934–2010)

Personal information
- Full name: Richard Henry Searle
- Born: 16 January 1934; Red Hill, Queensland, Australia
- Died: 20 October 2010 (aged 76); Canberra, Australia
- Batting: Left-handed
- Bowling: Left-arm fast-medium
- Role: Bowler

Domestic team information
- Years: Team
- 1954/55: Queensland
- Only FC: 1 January 1955 Queensland v New South Wales

Career statistics
Competition	First-class
Matches	1
Runs scored	0
Batting average	0.00
100s/50s	0/0
Top score	0
Balls bowled	229
Wickets	4
Bowling average	32.75
5 wickets in innings	0
10 wickets in match	0
Best bowling	4/83
Catches/stumpings	2/–
- Source: CricInfo, 5 August 2009

Richard Henry Searle (16 January 1934 – 12 October 2010) was an Australian cricket for Queensland. A left-arm fast-medium bowler, he made one first class cricket appearance during the 1954/55 season. He took four wickets for 83 in his only innings with the ball and scored no runs with the bat, during a match against New South Wales on 1 January 1955. Outside of first-class cricket, he also played a handful of matches for the Queensland Colts, and went on to play for Australian Capital Territory between 1959 and 1963. Searle died in Canberra on 12 October 2010, at the age of 76.
