= Thomas Grimstead =

English cricketer (1803–1884)

Thomas Grimstead (26 March 1803 – 24 January 1884) was an English cricketer with possibly amateur status who was active in 1831. He was born in Leatherhead, Surrey and died in Redbourn, Hertfordshire. He made his debut in 1831 and appeared in one match as an unknown handedness batsman whose bowling style is unknown, playing for Surrey. He scored nine runs with a highest score of 6 and took no wickets.

== Bibliography ==
- Haygarth, Arthur (1996) [1862]. Scores & Biographies, Volume 1 (1744–1826). Kennington: Frederick Lillywhite. ISBN 978-19-00592-23-9.
- Haygarth, Arthur (1997) [1862]. Scores & Biographies, Volume 2 (1827–1840). Kennington: Frederick Lillywhite. ISBN 978-19-00592-23-9.
