= Charles Duff (cricketer) =

English cricketer

Charles Duff (21 April 1794 – 1848) was an English professional cricketer who played from 1824 to 1830.

He played for Sussex and made 12 known appearances in important matches.

== Bibliography ==
- Haygarth, Arthur (1996) [1862]. Scores & Biographies, Volume 1 (1744–1826). Kennington: Frederick Lillywhite. ISBN 978-19-00592-23-9.
