= James Thumwood =

English cricketer (1790–1853)

James Thumwood (1790 – 27 May 1853) was an English professional cricketer who played from 1816 to 1826. He was the brother of John Thumwood.

Mainly associated with Hampshire, he made 23 known appearances in important matches. He played for the Players in the Gentlemen v Players series.

== Bibliography ==
- Haygarth, Arthur (1996) [1862]. Scores & Biographies, Volume 1 (1744–1826). Kennington: Frederick Lillywhite. ISBN 978-19-00592-23-9.
- Haygarth, Arthur (1997) [1862]. Scores & Biographies, Volume 2 (1827–1840). Kennington: Frederick Lillywhite. ISBN 978-19-00592-23-9.
