= Richard Searle (Sussex cricketer) =

English cricketer

Richard Searle (christened 12 October 1789 at Lurgashall, Sussex; details of death unknown) was an English professional cricketer who played from 1822 to 1835. He was mainly associated with Sussex and made 3 known appearances.

== Bibliography ==
- Arthur Haygarth, Scores & Biographies, Volume 1 (1744–1826), Lillywhite, 1862
