= Thomas Howard (English cricketer) =

English cricketer

Thomas Charles Howard (19 July 1781 – 18 May 1864) was an English professional cricketer who played from 1803 to 1828. He was mainly associated with Hampshire but also played for Marylebone Cricket Club (MCC), where he was employed as a ground staff bowler.

Howard was a right-handed batsman and an occasional wicketkeeper but he was noted as a right arm fast medium bowler, using the underarm style. He made 88 known appearances in important matches and is one of a handful of players who appeared for both teams in the Gentlemen v Players series.

Howard played for the Players in the inaugural and second Gentlemen v Players matches in 1806 and made further appearances for the Players to 1829. He also played for the Gentlemen as a given man in 1820, when his involvement in nine dismissals was a factor in their 70 run victory.
