= Will Caldecourt =

English cricketer

William Henry Caldecourt (28 September 1802 – 21 June 1857) was an English professional cricketer who played from 1821 to 1844.

A medium pace underarm bowler who was mainly associated with Cambridge Town Club and Marylebone Cricket Club (MCC), he made 42 known appearances in important matches. He represented the Players in the Gentlemen v Players series and the South in the North v. South series.

== Bibliography ==
- Carlaw, Derek (2020). Kent County Cricketers, A to Z: Part One (1806–1914) (PDF). Cardiff: ACS.
- Haygarth, Arthur (1996) [1862]. Scores & Biographies, Volume 1 (1744–1826). Kennington: Frederick Lillywhite. ISBN 978-19-00592-23-9.
- Haygarth, Arthur (1997) [1862]. Scores & Biographies, Volume 2 (1827–1840). Kennington: Frederick Lillywhite. ISBN 978-19-00592-23-9.
