= Thomas Beagley =

English cricketer

Thomas Beagley (5 October 1789 – 21 February 1858) was an English professional cricketer. He had two brothers Henry and John who also played. He was arguably the most talented of the trio, playing for Hampshire, Surrey, Suffolk, England and the MCC during his 23-year playing career. Beagley was regarded as one of the greatest hitters of a ball in England in the 1820s up to the early 1830s.

== Early life ==
Born into a working-class family to Stephen and Mary Beagley (née Gould), Beagley was baptised four days after his birth, on 9 November 1789. His family had lived in Farringdon since as far back as 1692, and in the Alton area as far back as 1605. He had some roots in other Hampshire settlements, such as Hartley Mauditt and Bentworth, and was connected to families such as Fry, Carter, Page, Russell and Grant.

== Career ==
Beagley was mainly associated with Hampshire and made 70 known appearances from 1816 to 1839. He was a specialist batsman whose highest career score was 113*, which also happened to be the first century in a Gentlemen v Players match. He made his debut at Lord's against the MCC for Hampshire, making a single run in the first innings, and 19 in the second. In his final match, Beagley made a total of 9 over two innings for England, against the MCC. Beagley represented England during the roundarm trial matches, representing the team in all three matches. Come the end of his career, his batting average was 17.10, having scored 1916 runs in 127 innings, including 15 not outs. Beagley represented Hampshire, Suffolk, Surrey, The Bs, the Marylebone Cricket Club (MCC), Godalming, England, and the South (not mentioning less notable clubs and teams). Even in his twilight years, Beagley represented the South three times in the North v South series, including the inaugural match in 1836.

== Bibliography ==
- Haygarth, Arthur (1996) [1862]. Scores & Biographies, Volume 1 (1744–1826). Kennington: Frederick Lillywhite. ISBN 978-19-00592-23-9.
- Haygarth, Arthur (1997) [1862]. Scores & Biographies, Volume 2 (1827–1840). Kennington: Frederick Lillywhite. ISBN 978-19-00592-23-9.
