= William Broadbridge =

English cricketer

William Broadbridge (1 October 1790 – 19 April 1860) was an English professional cricketer who played from 1817 to 1830. He was a brother of Jem Broadbridge and a cousin of George Millyard.

A right-handed batsman and occasional wicket-keeper who played for Sussex, he made 25 known appearances in important matches.

== Bibliography ==
- Haygarth, Arthur (1996) [1862]. Scores & Biographies, Volume 1 (1744–1826). Kennington: Frederick Lillywhite. ISBN 978-19-00592-23-9.
- Haygarth, Arthur (1997) [1862]. Scores & Biographies, Volume 2 (1827–1840). Kennington: Frederick Lillywhite. ISBN 978-19-00592-23-9.
