= James Saunders (cricketer) =

English cricketer

James Saunders (27 May 1802 – 27 March 1832) was an English cricketer in the 1820s. He was a left-handed batsman and an occasional wicket-keeper who represented many different teams from 1822 to 1831. In county cricket, he played for Sussex (1823–1825), Kent (1827) and Surrey (1828–1830). He belonged to a cricketing family as his cousins were Richard Searle and his better known brother William Searle.

Saunders was born and lived his whole life in Haslemere, Surrey, where he was a butcher. He was about 5'11" tall and weighed around 12 st. He died aged 29 of consumption and had to stop playing cricket in 1831, a year before his death. According to Scores and Biographies, he was a "showy" batsman whose favourite shot was the square cut.

Saunders made his known debut in the 1822 season and appeared in 54 known matches to the 1831 season. He scored 2,180 career runs at a batting average of 24.22 with a highest score of 100. He rarely bowled but he did take two wickets.

== Bibliography ==
- Carlaw, Derek (2020). Kent County Cricketers, A to Z: Part One (1806–1914) (PDF). Cardiff: ACS.
