= John Thumwood =

English cricketer

John Thumwood (born 17 April 1785 at Hartley Row, Hampshire; died 13 November 1839 at Elvetham, Hampshire) was an English professional cricketer who played from 1816 to 1821. He was mainly associated with Hampshire and made 8 known appearances in important matches, including one for the Players in 1821.

He was the elder brother of James Thumwood.

== Bibliography ==
- Arthur Haygarth, Scores & Biographies, Volumes 1-2 (1744–1840), Lillywhite, 1862
