= John Beagley =

English cricketer

John Beagley (22 July 1800 – 12 July 1885) was an English professional cricketer who played from 1823 to 1826. He was mainly associated with Hampshire and made 6 known appearances in important matches. His debut game was Hampshire versus England at Bramshill, on 14–18 August 1823; his final game was Hampshire and Surrey versus Sussex at Bramshill on 7–8 August 1826.

Beagley was born at Farringdon, Hampshire and died at Farnham, Surrey.

== Bibliography ==
- Haygarth, Arthur (1996) [1862]. Scores & Biographies, Volume 1 (1744–1826). Kennington: Frederick Lillywhite. ISBN 978-19-00592-23-9.
- Haygarth, Arthur (1997) [1862]. Scores & Biographies, Volume 2 (1827–1840). Kennington: Frederick Lillywhite. ISBN 978-19-00592-23-9.
