= William Slater (cricketer) =

English cricketer

William Slater (17 November 1790 – 9 March 1852) was an English professional cricketer. His brother was John Slater.

He mainly played for Sussex and made 29 appearances from 1815 to 1829. Slater was a left-handed batsman and an occasional wicket-keeper.
