= George Brown (cricketer, born 1783) =

English cricketer

Personal information
- Born: 6 October 1887; Cowley, Oxfordshire
- Died: 25 June 1857 (aged 73); Winchester, Hampshire, England
- Batting: Right-handed
- Bowling: Right-arm fast
- Relatives: John Brown (son); George Brown Jr. (son)

Domestic team information
- Years: Team
- 1819–1828: Hampshire
- 1825–1838: Sussex

George Brown (27 April 1783 – 25 June 1857) was an English professional cricketer who played from 1819 to 1838.

== Career ==
A right-handed batsman and fast underarm bowler who played for Hampshire and Sussex, he made 51 known appearances in important matches. He represented the Players in the Gentlemen v Players series.

Brown was credited with 89 wickets in his career (i.e., bowled only) with a best return of six in one innings. He had a reputation for extreme pace and was widely known as "Brown of Brighton". He is said, though the story may be apocryphal, to have once, at practice, killed a dog when a ball he had bowled went past the stumps and through a coat held by the longstop, hitting the dog which was behind the coat. Another of his longstops, a man called Dench, insisted on fielding with a sack of straw tied to his chest for protection. E H Budd played against both Brown and Walter Marcon, who had a similar reputation, and Budd said that "Brown was not more terrific in his speed than Marcon", an elaborate way of saying that they were both extremely fast. Brown was a useful batsman and made 1053 runs at 11.44 with a top score of 70 which he scored during the first of the three roundarm trial matches.

== Death ==
He died in Winchester, Hampshire.

== Bibliography ==
- Haygarth, Arthur (1996) [1862]. Scores & Biographies, Volume 1 (1744–1826). Kennington: Frederick Lillywhite. ISBN 978-19-00592-23-9.
- Haygarth, Arthur (1997) [1862]. Scores & Biographies, Volume 2 (1827–1840). Kennington: Frederick Lillywhite. ISBN 978-19-00592-23-9.
