= John Bowyer (cricketer) =

English cricketer (1790–1880)

Personal information
- Born: 18 June 1790
- Died: 3 February 1880 (aged 89)

John Bowyer (18 June 1790 – 3 February 1880) was an English professional cricketer.

He was mainly associated with Surrey and he made 18 known appearances from 1810 to 1828.

== Bibliography ==
- Haygarth, Arthur (1996) [1862]. Scores & Biographies, Volume 1 (1744–1826). Kennington: Frederick Lillywhite. ISBN 978-19-00592-23-9.
- Haygarth, Arthur (1997) [1862]. Scores & Biographies, Volume 2 (1827–1840). Kennington: Frederick Lillywhite. ISBN 978-19-00592-23-9.
