= Charles Pierpoint =

English cricketer

Charles Joseph Pierpoint (born 3 September 1795 at Lindfield, Sussex; details of death unknown) was an English amateur cricketer who played from 1825 to 1827. He was mainly associated with Sussex, and he made 4 known appearances in important matches.

== Bibliography ==
- Arthur Haygarth, Scores & Biographies, Volume 1-2 (1744–1840), Lillywhite, 1862
