= Charles Lanaway =

English cricketer

Charles Lanaway (16 March 1793 at Henfield, Sussex – 6 February 1870 at Brighton) was an English professional cricketer who played from 1825 to 1838.

A right-handed batsman and underarm bowler who was mainly associated with Sussex, he made 36 known appearances in important matches. He represented the Players in the Gentlemen v Players series.
