= The Burys =

Cricket ground in Godalming, Surrey

Coordinates: 51.1870°N 0.6117°W

The Burys cricket ground
- Interactive map of The Burys cricket ground
- Location: Godalming, Surrey
- Home club: Godalming Cricket Club
- Establishment: by 1821
- Last used: 1830

The Burys at Godalming, Surrey was used as the venue for nine cricket matches between 1821 and 1830. It was used by the Godalming Cricket Club for all of its home matches and by Surrey.
