= Petworth Park =

Sports venue in Petworth, England

Coordinates: 50.9864°N 0.6099°W

Petworth Park cricket ground
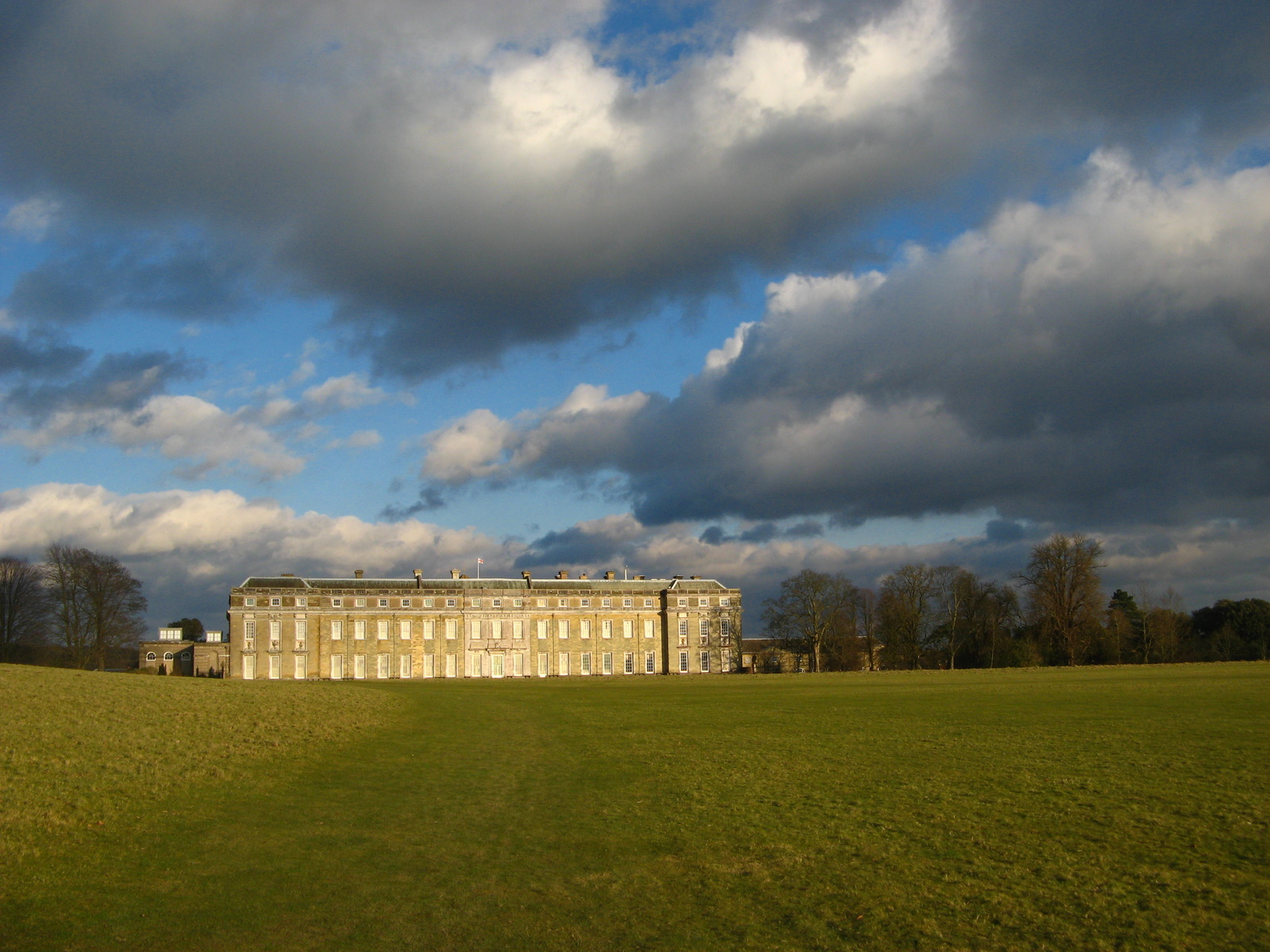
- Modern view of where the ground was located
- Interactive map of Petworth Park cricket ground
- Location: Petworth, Sussex
- Home club: Sussex
- Establishment: by 1821
- Last used: 1830

Petworth Park at Petworth, Sussex was used as the venue for three cricket matches between 1824 and 1826. The ground was in front of the main house, before the cricket ground was moved to its current location nearby at Petworth Park New Ground.
