= William Searle (cricketer) =

English cricketer

William Searle (christened 14 February 1796 – February 1837) was an English cricketer in the 19th century. He was right-handed as a bowler and a fielder but he batted left-handed. Searle played mainly for Surrey. According to Scores and Biographies, he was a "steady and scientific" batsman who was rated one of the "cracks" of his day in a relatively short career.

Searle was about 5'10" tall and weighed about 12 stones. In 1820 he moved from Thursley to Godalming where he followed the almost traditional cricketing trade of innkeeper. He is known to have been the landlord of the Three Lions Inn. Later he became a bailiff and then a steward when he moved to East Clandon.

His was a cricketing family. His elder brother Richard (born October 1789 at Lurgashall in Sussex) played three matches for Sussex between 1823 and 1825. Better known was their cousin James Saunders.

William Searle made his debut in the 1821 season and had 48 known appearances in major matches to the 1833 season. He scored 1537 runs @ 18.29 with a highest score of 87, which is a creditable record given the prevailing pitch conditions of his time. He only bowled occasionally and took 8 (known) wickets.

== Bibliography ==
- Carlaw, Derek (2020). Kent County Cricketers, A to Z: Part One (1806–1914) (PDF). Cardiff: ACS.
