= Godalming Cricket Club =

Cricket club in Surrey, England

Godalming Cricket Club is based at Godalming in Surrey, and was briefly a senior cricket team, playing 12 known matches between 1821 and 1825. Its home ground then was The Burys but is now Holloway Hill recreation ground.

Julius Caesar began his career at Godalming where he attracted local press attention at age 16, in the Surrey Gazette. He helped Godalming beat Surrey at The Oval in 1849, aged 18, by making scores of 67 and 46.

== Recent history ==
The club now plays home matches at Holloway Hill Sports Association's recreation ground in Godalming with clubhouse facilities in the pavilion. It is a CASC registered club with HM Revenue and Customs.

In August 2004 the club played Old England including John Lever, Derek Randall and Derek Underwood in a charity event to raise funds for Chace Children's Hospice.

In February 2006, an arson attack destroyed the pavilion at nearby Thursley Cricket Club. Within hours, Godalming had offered the use of its facilities to Thursley.

== Bibliography ==
- Arthur Haygarth, Scores & Biographies, Volume 1 (1744–1826), Lillywhite, 1862
