= Tom Marsden =

English cricketer (1803–1843)

Thomas Marsden (12 September 1803 – 27 February 1843) was an English cricketer whose career spanned the 1826 to 1841 seasons.

Born in Sheffield, Marsden was an all-rounder who batted left-handed and bowled either left-arm fast (underarm) or slow left-arm orthodox (roundarm). He played mostly for Sheffield Cricket Club at a time when it was representative of Yorkshire as a county and he was one of the first great Yorkshire cricketers.

Marsden's known career record consists of 55 matches. He played 99 innings and scored 1724 runs. He made two centuries and three fifties. His highest score was 227 in his debut match, for Sheffield & Leicester versus Nottingham at Darnall New Ground, Sheffield in 1826. He is the first player to score a double century on debut. He is believed to have been an outfielder and took 44 catches. As a bowler, he took 97 wickets with a best performance of seven wickets in one innings.

In 1833, Marsden came up against Fuller Pilch in a single-wicket competition for the Championship of England. Although Pilch had little interest in such abbreviated forms of the game, he won comfortably. Marsden died in Sheffield in 1843.

== See also ==
- List of double centuries scored on cricket debut
