= William Lillywhite =

English cricketer (1792–1854)

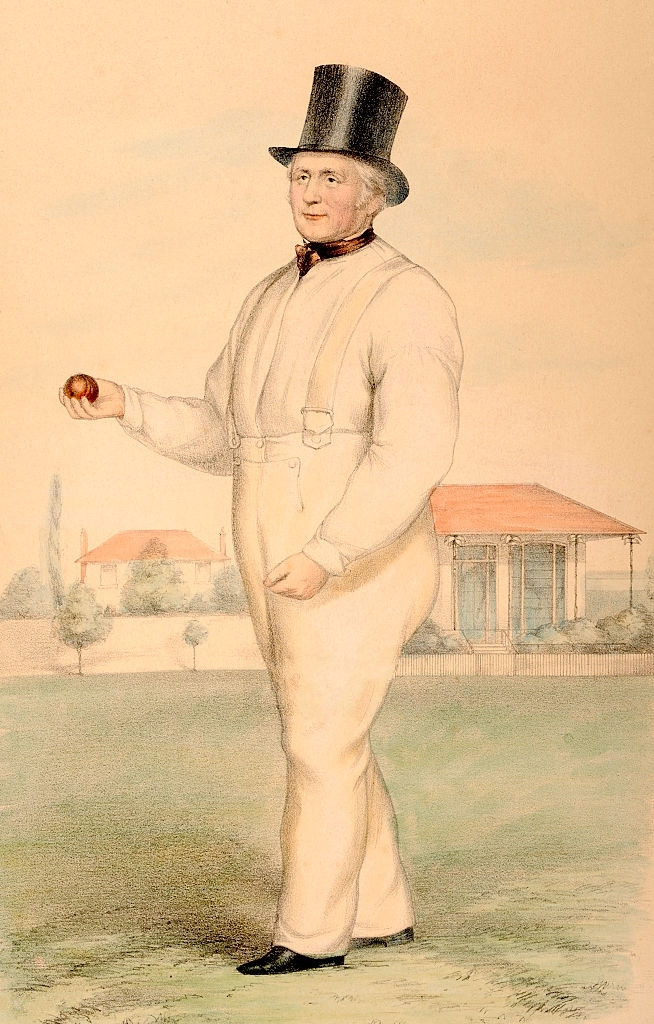

Personal information
- Full name: Frederick William Lillywhite
- Born: 13 June 1792; Westhampnett, Sussex
- Died: 21 August 1854 (aged 62); Islington, London
- Nickname: The Nonpareil
- Height: 5 ft 4 in (1.63 m)
- Batting: Right-handed
- Bowling: Right-arm roundarm
- Role: Bowler

Domestic team information
- Years: Team
- 1825–1853: Sussex
- 1829: Surrey
- 1830–1850: Marylebone Cricket Club
- 1842–1845: Hampshire
- 1850–1851: Middlesex

Frederick William Lillywhite (13 June 1792 – 21 August 1854) was an English cricketer during the game's roundarm era. One of the main protagonists in the legalisation of roundarm, he was one of the most successful bowlers of his era. His status is borne out by his nickname: The Nonpareil.

Lillywhite's known career spanned the 1825 to 1853 seasons, and he played for Sussex County Cricket Club as well as the Marylebone Cricket Club, and also represented Surrey, Hampshire, and Middlesex in the period before the formation of the current county clubs. Detailed bowling figures for many of his matches are not known: he took 1576 wickets in 237 matches, and took 155 five-wicket hauls and 55 ten-wicket hauls. He was an original member of William Clarke's All England Eleven.

He married Charlotte Parker (1790 - 1870) at Westhampnett, Sussex on 15 July 1822. Part of a cricketing dynasty, he was the father of John Lillywhite and Fred Lillywhite, and uncle of James Lillywhite.

== Career ==
=== Early days ===
Lillywhite was born on 13 June 1792 in Westhampnett, near Chichester. Little is known of his early life, with no references to him in a cricketing sense until 11 July 1822, when he is noted in the records of a cricket match which took place in Goodwood Park, in the grounds of Goodwood House near his birthplace. He is recorded later that year as moving to Brighton where he appeared for a local cricket club for two years. He features on a scorecard for West Sussex v East Sussex which took place at Petworth Park on 5 July 1824, where he took four wickets in West Sussex's first innings, and scored 26 runs batting down the order.

=== Sussex debut ===
Lillywhite's seasons in Brighton improved his bowling enough to earn him a debut for Sussex in 1825. His chance came in part due to a desire to test the emerging roundarm bowling style against established players, and his first matches were the so-called Roundarm trial matches, in which he was permitted to bowl roundarm. Lillywhite played his first of these games in Brighton on 13 June against Kent. Batting first, Lillywhite made 41 to complement the 70 made by opener George Brown and career-best 85 by Charles Pierpoint. He then took two wickets in his first outing with the ball, and a third in Kent's second innings as Kent were dismissed for 40 and 43, losing by 243 runs. Lillywhite made two more appearances for his county that season, and finished the year with thirteen wickets. He made four more appearances in 1826, while continuing to play West Sussex against East Sussex matches in Brighton and Petworth. He took 27 wickets that summer, including sixteen wickets – seven in the first innings and nine in the second – as part of a combined Surrey and Sussex against Hampshire in Bramshill on 7 August. Though he only features in five matches in 1827, eight the following season, and seven more the year after that, Lillywhite's wicket tallies continued to grow from twenty to thirty-four and then forty-two wickets including four five-wicket hauls in 1829, both representing then-career best return. He thus established himself in the county team, and was rewarded with twelve matches in 1832 in which he took seventy-one wickets. He was also invited to play for the Marylebone Cricket Club from 1830 onwards, for whom he would go on to take over 400 wickets.

=== 1833 to 1842 ===
Lillywhite's cricket in the 1833 season was reduced to only six appearances, though he took thirty-seven wickets. He continued to occupy his time with further appearances at West Sussex v East Sussex games. He took thirty-eight wickets in 1834 and forty-two more in 1835. Lillywhite's success was now leading to further controversy of the status of roundarm bowling, and he was becoming well known throughout the country. The MCC Had altered the laws twice during the early years of Lillywhite's career with regards to what height the bowler could raise his arm. That year the MCC governing body, in light of the growing success of roundarm bowling by Lillywhite and fellow Sussex player Jem Broadbridge, modified the playing rules to officially legalise roundarm bowling.

After taking fifty wickets in a season for the first time in 1836, Lillywhite then enjoyed unprecedented success in the 1837 season. He played only ten matches, two fewer than in 1832, however he took ninety-nine wickets. One of the first seasons of his career for which complete records survive, his bowling average is recorded at only 8.65, and his return included eleven five-wicket hauls and six ten-fors. Lillywhite's prowess also resulted in an increasing number of offers to play for invitational elevens. In the 1830s and 1840s he appeared for an England, Right-Handed XI, Married XI, several Gentlemen v Players teams – in which he appeared for both at difference times – a Slow Bowlers XI, North of England, South of England, Gentlemen of Sussex and Fuller Pilch's Invitational XI. He took 42 more wickets in 1838, before reaping great rewards in 1839 and 1840 with 78 and 83 wickets respectively. In 1842 he began playing for Hampshire and also for Cambridge Town. His wicket tallies passed one-hundred wickets for a season for the first time in 1842, when he took 103 from fourteen matches.

=== Hampshire, Middlesex and Sussex ===
By 1843 Lillywhite was consistently playing fifteen or sixteen matches each season, appearing for Hampshire, the MCC and Sussex. He took over one-hundred wickets for three consecutive seasons between 1842 and 1844, and after taking eighty-four in 1845 he returned with 102 the following year. By now Lillywhite's ability with the ball was becoming infamous, and he acquired the moniker Non pareil – unrivalled or matchless (or "the non pareil bowler" to distinguish him from Fuller Pilch, "the non pareil hitter"). "It was seldom that he played without obtaining a wicket," noted cricket historian R. J. Brown, "He was a short thick-set powerful man about 5' 4" in height, with a knack of detecting quickly any weak points in his opponents' defences." It was also in 1844 that he made his career-best with the bat, 44 not out. He took sixty-five wickets in total in 1847, seventy-two in 1848 and sixty-seven more in 1849. By this time he was nearing sixty years of age, and despite playing thirteen games in 1849 by the next season he could manage only six matches for Middlesex, for whom he featured briefly, though he was still effective with twenty-seven scalps. Aware that his career was coming to an end, a benefit match was awarded to him in 1853 against an England. It began on 25 July at Lord's, and Lillywhite bowled eleven wicketless overs before succumbing to illness. He was replaced by a substitute cricketer and did not play again.

== Later life ==
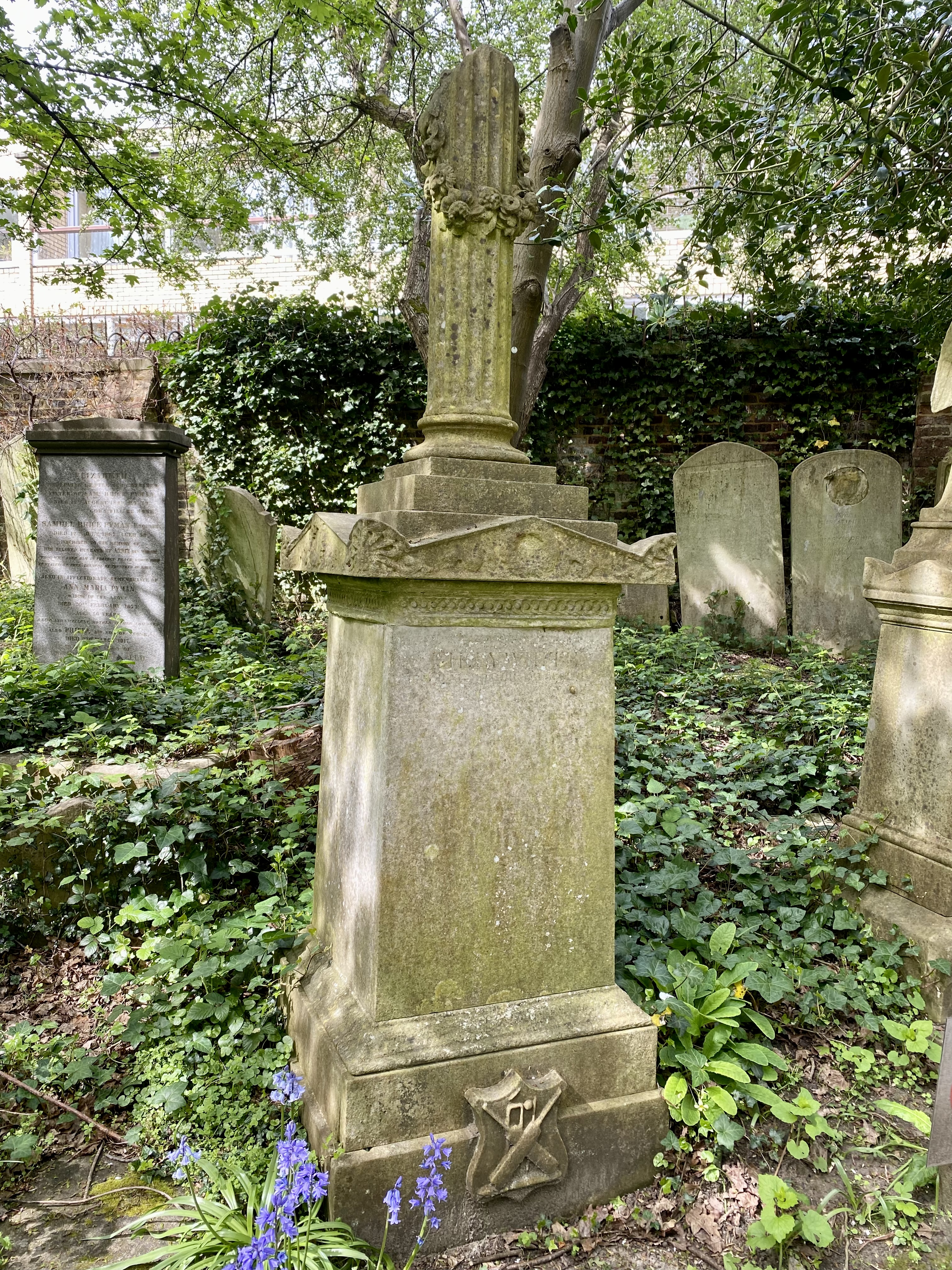
Lillywhite's grave at Highgate Cemetery

He died in Islington, only a year after his benefit match, in August 1854, and was buried on the western team of Highgate Cemetery. His monument, which was paid for by public subscription, features below the worn inscription on the pedestal, a shield with crossed bats and stumps, with a ball removing a bail. On top of the pedestal is a broken column and wreath symbolising "a life cut short". His grave is listed Grade II on the National Heritage List for England.

== External sources ==
- Media related to William Lillywhite at Wikimedia Commons
- William Lillywhite at Cricinfo
