= Jem Broadbridge =

English cricketer (1795–1843)

Personal information
- Full name: James Broadbridge
- Born: 25 June 1795; Duncton, Sussex
- Died: 12 February 1843 (aged 47); Duncton, Sussex
- Batting: Right-handed
- Bowling: Right-arm fast-medium
- Role: All-rounder

Domestic team information
- Years: Team
- 1814–1840: Sussex
- Source: CricInfo, 29 June 2009

James "Jem" Broadbridge (1795–1843) was an English professional cricketer who is widely recognised as the outstanding all-rounder in England during the 1820s. He played mainly for Sussex and made 102 known appearances in important matches from 1814 to 1840, being best remembered for his part in the introduction of roundarm bowling. He played for the Players in the Gentlemen v Players series and the South in the North v. South series.

== Cricket career ==
Born on 25 June 1795 in Duncton, Petworth, Sussex, Jem Broadbridge had a known career spanning the 1814 to 1840 English seasons. In 102 matches, he scored 2,671 runs at a batting average of 16.59 runs per innings with a highest score of 135. He took 51 catches and at least 324 wickets.

He had an outstanding season in 1825 when inter-county cricket was revived for the first time since 1796, with Sussex playing two matches each against Hampshire and Kent. Broadbridge scored the most runs in the season with 552 at an average of 46.00 and also took the most wickets with 31. This was the first time that one player had led both the batting and bowling rankings in a single season.

Broadbridge repeated the feat in 1828, the year after the roundarm trial matches, when he scored 316 runs at 19.75 and took 46 wickets. Although roundarm had not yet been formally legalised, it was noted that Broadbridge and his Sussex colleague William Lillywhite constantly bowled with arm outstretched and the umpires did not no-ball them. Roundarm became known as "Sussex bowling" and this nickname stuck for a long time.

Broadbridge had been arguably the best player in England during the 1820s but he was past his best in the 1830s, although he still had much to offer in terms of knowledge and experience. He continued playing until the 1840 season.

== Roundarm controversy ==
Broadbridge and Lillywhite were innovators who did much to have roundarm bowling legalised. In the 1827 season, three roundarm trial matches were staged between Sussex and England to evaluate roundarm vis-à-vis underarm. Broadbridge and Lillywhite were allowed to bowl roundarm for Sussex but the England players had to bowl underarm. The result of the "trial" was inconclusive but in practice, with umpires turning a blind eye, Broadbridge and Lillywhite continued to bowl roundarm without penalty.

== Style and technique ==
Known to his fellow cricketers as "Our Jem", Broadbridge was arguably the outstanding all-rounder of his time. According to Arthur Haygarth in Scores and Biographies, he was "for some seasons the best general cricketer in England, both as a batsman, bowler and single wicket player". He bowled right-arm fast-medium and batted right-handed. He was described by Haygarth as "an extremely hard hitter".

The bowling of Broadbridge and Lillywhite was the key factor in the success of Sussex, which was hailed as the Champion County in the 1820s. Haygarth says that Broadbridge began as a "slinging" bowler who afterwards delivered roundarm. He was quicker than medium pace but varied his length and speed "with effect".

Broadbridge was described as "one of the most fox-headed fellows that ever bowled and was enough to worry and puzzle any man alive".

In the third of the roundarm trial matches in 1827, Broadbridge was out to one of the most unusual dismissals ever recorded. Despite his team having been told to bat steadily in their second innings when chasing 120 to win, Broadbridge at the start literally threw his bat out of his hands at a wide delivery. Bat and ball made contact and the ball flew off to point where it was caught by William Ward and Broadbridge was out. England then won by 25 runs.

== Family and personal life ==
Broadbridge belonged to a farming family and lived all his life at Duncton. He regularly walked from Duncton to Brighton and back, a 60 miles (97 km) round trip, to play cricket. He was the son of William and Mary Broadbridge. His height was 5 feet 10 inches (1.78 m) and he weighed about 12 stone (76 kg). He died at Duncton in 1843 having not married.

His elder brother William Broadbridge (1790–1860) was an occasional Sussex player in 25 matches between 1817 and 1830. His younger brother Robin (born 1797) played four matches between 1822 and 1824. The Broadbridge brothers were cousins of their Sussex colleague George Millyard.

Broadbridge's home village of Duncton has a pub named The Cricketers in honour of Broadbridge and his colleague Jemmy Dean, another lifelong resident.

== Bibliography ==
- Haygarth, Arthur (1996) [1862]. Scores & Biographies, Volume 1 (1744–1826). Kennington: Frederick Lillywhite. ISBN 978-19-00592-23-9.
- Haygarth, Arthur (1997) [1862]. Scores & Biographies, Volume 2 (1827–1840). Kennington: Frederick Lillywhite. ISBN 978-19-00592-23-9.
