= Roundarm bowling =

Bowling style

In cricket, roundarm bowling is a bowling style that was introduced in the first quarter of the 19th century and largely superseded underarm bowling by the 1830s. Using a roundarm action, the bowlers extend their arm about 90 degrees from their body at the point where they release the ball. Roundarm fell into decline after 1864 when the current style of overarm bowling was legalised, although W. G. Grace continued to use it to the end of his career.

== Origin ==
The spread of roundarm in the 1820s was a natural reaction to the growing predominance of batsmen over the age-old underarm style of bowling. Its adherents argued that the legalisation of roundarm was essential to restore the balance between batting and bowling.

The idea of roundarm is sometimes attributed to Christiana Willes, sister of Kent cricketer John Willes. The story goes that when bowling to her brother in the garden at home in the 1800s, Willes found herself inconvenienced by her large, lead-weighted dress which prevented her from performing the underarm action. Elevating the arm to just above waist height, she bowled without interference from her attire. According to John Major in More Than A Game, the story is unlikely to be true for reasons of fashion more than cricket because hooped skirts were out of fashion during the period of the Napoleonic War.

Roundarm is also claimed to have been devised in the 1790s by Tom Walker, known as Old Everlasting. Walker was a famous opening batsman who had a solid defensive technique and was notoriously difficult to dismiss. He was also a more than useful bowler who was always looking for ways to improvise. Legend has it that he and some of his fellow players in the "Hambledon Era" used to practice in a barn during the winters. Walker worked out that he could generate more bounce and variation of pace if he bowled with his arm away from his body and soon realised that these deliveries gave the batsman added problems. He tried to use the style in historically important matches but was no-balled and had to return to his usual underarm lobs, with which he was by no means unsuccessful.

== Prohibition and eventual legalisation ==
Whatever the origin, John Willes realised that the pace and bounce generated by this raised arm action made the delivery potentially more difficult to play than a conventional underarm one and so he adopted the style himself with his arm coming through at shoulder height. He tried, without success, to have it accepted in senior cricket.

The matter was controversial enough for a law to be introduced in 1816 into the Laws of Cricket to prohibit roundarm:

The ball must be bowled (not thrown or jerked), and be delivered underhand, with the hand below the elbow. But if the ball be jerked, or the arm extended from the body horizontally, and any part of the hand be uppermost, or the hand horizontally extended when the ball is delivered, the Umpires shall call, "No Ball".

On 15 July 1822, in the MCC v Kent match at Lord's, Willes opened the bowling for Kent and was promptly no-balled for using his roundarm action. He had been trying at various times to introduce the style since 1807. Being no-balled on this occasion was the final straw, for Willes reportedly threw the ball away and withdrew from the match, literally going straight to his horse and riding away. He refused to play again in any important fixture.

Although Willes had quit the game, he had made his point and others were willing to pick his ball up and persevere. In 1826, Sussex had the best team in England and were acclaimed as the "Champion County" in some quarters. Their success owed much to the prowess of two bowlers William Lillywhite and Jem Broadbridge, both of whom were champions of the roundarm style, when they could get away with it. Lillywhite was one of the all-time great bowlers and was nicknamed "the Nonpareil".

In 1827, to test the validity of roundarm bowling, three England v Sussex roundarm trial matches were arranged, but no immediate decision was made about legalisation. Lillywhite and Broadbridge used roundarm to great effect against the England batsmen who made loud objections.

But the batsmen were losing the argument. In 1828, following the Sussex v England roundarm trials, Marylebone Cricket Club (MCC) modified Rule 10 to permit the bowler's hand to be raised as high as the elbow. Lillywhite, Broadbridge and their supporters continued to bowl at shoulder height and the umpires did not no-ball them.

By 1835, powerless to prevent the use of roundarm, MCC finally amended the Laws of Cricket to make it legal. The relevant part of the Law stated: "if the hand be above the shoulder in the delivery, the umpire must call 'No Ball'." It was not long before bowlers' hands started to go above the shoulder and the 1835 Law had to be reinforced in 1845 by removing benefit of the doubt from the bowler in the matter of his hand's height when delivering the ball.

== Legacy ==
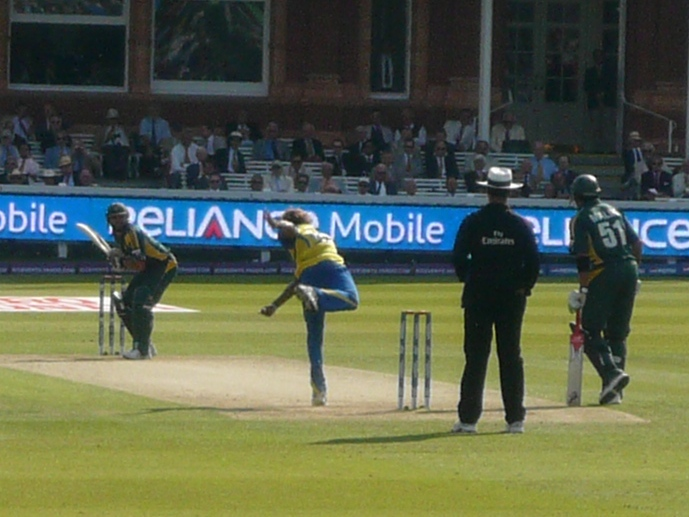
Sri Lanka's Lasith Malinga bowling a round arm delivery against Pakistan

Although underarm bowlers did not fade away, roundarm became the predominant style until another controversy erupted about overarm in 1864. Prominent roundarm bowlers to succeed Lillywhite and Broadbridge were Alfred Mynn, John Jackson and W. G. Grace.

In the modern game, the Sri Lankan pace bowler Lasith Malinga has a very distinctive action which is authentic roundarm, earning him the name "Slinga Malinga". There are some who question the legality of this action, but it is legal, because his arm does not straighten from a bent position as he bowls. This is the strict definition of bowling vis-à-vis throwing. In fact, many bowlers bowl with a slightly bent arm; the key is that they do not straighten it as they bowl.

== See also ==
- Sidearm, the baseball equivalent
