= Goodbye, My Rose Garden =

Japanese yuri manga series

- Cover of the first tankōbon volume, featuring Alice (left) and Hanako (right)

さよならローズガーデン (Sayonara Rōzu Gāden)
- Genre: Historical; Romance; Yuri
- Manga
- Written by: Dr. Pepperco
- Published by: Mag Garden
- English publisher: NA: Seven Seas Entertainment
- Imprint: Blade Comics
- Magazine: MAGxiv
- Original run: July 9, 2018 – January 13, 2020
- Volumes: 3
- icon

Goodbye, My Rose Garden (さよならローズガーデン, Sayonara Rōzu Gāden) is a Japanese yuri manga series written and illustrated by Dr. Pepperco. It was serialized online on Mag Garden's MAGxiv from July 2018 to January 2020. Its chapters were later collected into three tankōbon volumes. It was licensed for an English-language release by Seven Seas Entertainment. The series follows Hanako Kujō, an aspiring novelist in England, and Alice Douglas, a noblewoman who hires Hanako as her maid.

Pepperco's idea for the series originally came from their interest in drawing Victorian-era maid uniforms. As they researched the social circumstances of the time, they conceived of Hanako as a New Woman and Alice as someone who had to hide her true self to keep her reputation. Pepperco referenced various sources to illustrate the manga's setting in England and incorporated allusions to writers of that time period.

The manga's themes were analyzed by several critics who noted its setting in Victorian-era England, a time and place where prejudice against same-sex relationships was widespread. Although the work pays homage to literature of that era, it was seen as subverting traditional tropes in its character relationships, literary devices, and ultimate resolution.

The series was well received, winning the yuri category of the 2021 Manga Barcelona Awards. The plot, characters, historical details and art style were generally met with positive reviews, with multiple critics opining that the last two aspects complemented each other well.

== Synopsis ==
In the early twentieth century, Hanako Kujō, an aspiring novelist, travels from Japan to England to follow her dream of meeting her idol, author Victor Franks. When she arrives, her request to meet him is flatly refused by Frank's publisher. Alice Douglas, a noblewoman, overhears the conversation and offers her employment as a personal maid to her.

Soon, Alice reveals that she can introduce Hanako to Franks, but only under one condition: Hanako must kill Alice. Shocked by her request, Hanako tries to learn more about Alice to better understand why she would make such a request, growing closer to her in the process.

== Characters ==
Hanako Kujō (九條 華子, Kujō Hanako)
An aspiring novelist who traveled to England in hopes of meeting her favorite author, Victor Franks. She instead finds herself as a personal maid to the noblewoman Alice Douglas.
Alice Douglas
A noblewoman who takes Hanako on as her personal maid after finding out that she is trying to find Victor Franks. Alice fears that rumors surrounding her once having an affair with her governess will cause disgrace to her family.
Edward
A nobleman who is arranged to marry Alice. He hopes their marriage will do away with any of the rumors surrounding Alice and is suspicious of her relationship with Hanako.
Eliza McGovern
Alice's former governess. She left and went to Japan after rumors surrounding them started to spread. She recommended that Hanako go to England.

== Development ==
Pepperco often consulted a Harrods catalog for inspiration; pictured is a 1912 "Harodds for Everything" catalog.

Dr. Pepperco, the creator of Goodbye, My Rose Garden, first encountered yuri manga upon seeing Kaoru Kurimoto's Untā Den Rinden no Bara, (Note: ウンター・デン・リンデンの薔; lit. 'Rose of Unter den Linden') a work that deeply influenced them. In addition, they became interested in the Victorian era at a young age after reading the Sherlock Holmes series. Although they were initially fascinated by the architecture and fashion of the era, they later became more interested in English history, especially events related to the social treatment of women and the corresponding rise of suffragettes.

According to Pepperco, the idea for Goodbye, My Rose Garden came from their desire to draw Victorian-era maid uniforms. As Pepperco researched the lives of Japanese women during those times to develop Hanako's background, they learned about the difficult social circumstances that they often faced. As such, they conceived of Hanako as a New Woman, an ideal of an independent woman in that time period. Meanwhile, Alice was created as a character who had to hide her secrets and seem like an exemplary noblewoman for the sake of her reputation.

Pepperco used a variety of sources to help illustrate the manga's setting in England, including their own photographs, picture books, and a book about Victorian jewelry. They also used a Harrods catalog, which they would check when they were struggling with their drawings. For a scene featuring a letter, they asked their editor to check the postal service's collection for old-fashioned stamps and postmarks. To portray the subtleties of the characters' emotions, Pepperco tried to show more than just facial expressions, such as by drawing panels that focused solely on hands. Although they had only illustrated digitally prior to creating Goodbye, My Rose Garden, they used a dip pen and ink for the series, an experience that they found enjoyable.

The series features various references to contemporary writers, including Oscar Wilde, Kate Chopin, and Sarah Orne Jewett; in addition, the pen name of "Victor Franks" is an allusion to Mary Shelley's Frankenstein. Pepperco described literature as something that helps motivate people to continue in spite of life's struggles and negativity; with this in mind, they sought to create a story where Alice and Hanako's relationship would begin with their shared interest in literary works.

== Themes ==
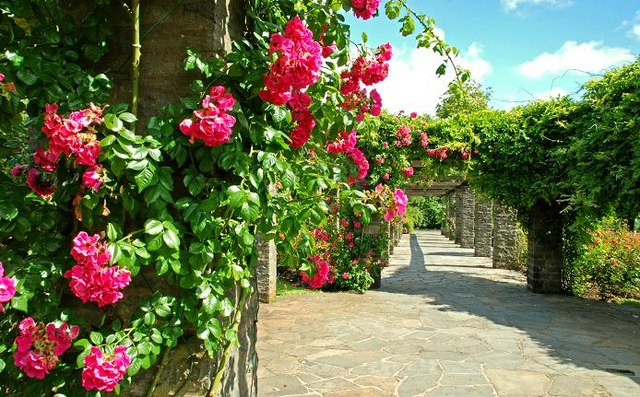
A rose garden plays an important role in the story, both visually and symbolically.

Goodbye, My Rose Garden takes place in Victorian-era England, a setting where prejudice and laws against same-sex relationships were common. During this time period, queer literature often relied on subtext to communicate romantic desires without bringing social or legal judgment upon their authors. One such work that the manga references is "Martha's Lady" by Sarah Orne Jewett, a short story representative of contemporary sapphic literature; Dee of Anime Feminist suggests that the "impossible love" within that story is paralleled to a significant extent by Goodbye, My Rose Garden. The manga also features various fin de siècle tropes often seen in literature featuring Class S, an aspect of early 20th-century Japanese culture associated with the modern yuri genre.

The relationship between Hanako and Alice was analyzed by several critics. Faye Hopper of Anime News Network characterized Hanako as a "counter to [the] despair" of struggling with societal expectations; rather than finding Alice in the wrong for defying them, Hanako sees the world itself as the problem that needs fixing. Similarly, Morgana Santilli of The Beat observed that Hanako's differing cultural background allows her to offer Alice a new perspective. Dee noted that while an uneven dynamic exists between Hanako and Alice as maid and noblewoman, respectively, their relationship begins once Alice leaves her position, thus making them equals. As such, Dee opined that the manga "remed[ies] the power imbalances" that were commonly portrayed in historical works.

A rose garden is one of the manga's central metaphors. In the story, roses are seen as having to be idealized and uniform, with outliers being pruned. Hopper argued that these roses represent queer emotions: feelings deviating from heteropatriarchal norms are rejected by society. In this sense, Hopper contends that the manga offers an optimistic interpretation; by leaving the rose garden's "world of false beauty", Alice and Hanako can finally acknowledge their love's legitimacy. Dee, analyzing the rose garden in traditional literature, noted that it often represents individuality and intimacy; in addition, flower language was used as subtext to explore places free from prevailing social expectations. Thus, she observed that leaving the garden may initially be seen as a "declaration of defeat". However, by having "subtext ... become text" through an upbeat ending, she argued that the story defies this expectation.

Dee also noted that the story's positive resolution subverts traditional Victorian queer literature that often ended in tragedy. She suggested that it was "valuable for historical fiction to acknowledge" how it was possible for queer relationships to succeed. By portraying this, she argued that that the work plays a positive role in normalizing such stories. Similarly, Erica Friedman, a longtime analyst of yuri manga, wrote that it "takes commitment" to write such an ending for a story set in an environment where women were deeply constrained by societal norms. In this regard, she placed Goodbye, My Rose Garden in the context of media that "imagines a better way forward" and "supplies us a better way to look backward."

== Media ==
Written and illustrated by Dr. Pepperco, Goodbye, My Rose Garden was published from July 9, 2018, to January 13, 2020, on the manga website MAGxiv. The series' chapters were collected in three tankōbon volumes released by Mag Garden from January 10, 2019, to February 7, 2020.

The manga is licensed in English by Seven Seas Entertainment. It released three volumes from April 14, 2020, to December 15, 2020.

=== Manga ===
No.	Original release date	Original ISBN	English release date	English ISBN
1	January 10, 2019	978-4-80000-823-7	April 14, 2020	978-1-64505-291-3
Chapter 1: "The Beginning of Farewell"; Chapter 2: "The Sun, the Thorns, and the Accomplices"; Chapter 3: "The Black Spot That Devours Me"; Chapter 4: "Nameless Beast, Nameless Bud"; Chapter 5: "Dark Clouds Above, the Sound of Distant Rain"
2	August 9, 2019	978-4-80000-883-1	July 21, 2020	978-1-64505-506-8
Chapter 6: "A Rose Burned Before a Grave"; Chapter 7: "The Shadow Eclipsing the Sun"; Chapter 8: "The Flames of Cowardice Incinerate Your Heart"; Chapter 9: "Pen Strokes That Cross Oceans"; Chapter 10: "The Sea Breeze Draws the Sun's Radiance"; Chapter 11: "The Sunlight Between Clouds and the Opening Bud"; Intermission: "Toffee for You"
3	February 7, 2020	978-4-80000-936-4	December 15, 2020	978-1-64505-815-1
Chapter 12: "Who Are the Briars?"; Chapter 13: "The Accomplice Smiles Back"; Chapter 14: "A Momentary Masquerade"; Chapter 15: "The Pulse of the Cocoon and the Wind That Breaks It"; Chapter 16: "My One and Only Wish"; Final Chapter: "Goodbye, My Rose Garden"

=== Drama reading ===
On February 8–9, 2020, a drama reading of Goodbye, My Rose Garden was performed at the theater TACCS1179 in Tokyo. Moeka Koizumi played Hanako Kujō and Kaya Okuno played Alice Douglas.

== Reception ==
The series was well received, winning the yuri category of the 2021 Manga Barcelona Awards. Hopper praised the manga as a "beautiful, moving period piece" that never shied away from heavy themes, while Dee called it a "masterclass in writing queer historical romance." Brigid Alverson of School Library Journal described the work as a "delightful period soap opera" and named it as one of her top ten manga series of 2020. Anthony Gramuglia of CBR felt that despite its flaws, it would be "profound and meaningful" for readers interested in a series that explored themes of self-conflict.

The manga's historical details were praised, with Rebecca Silverman of Anime News Network opining that the series was noteworthy for the depth of research in its character clothing, background scenery, and literary references. Morgana Santilli of The Beat favorably reviewed the story's "bevy of historically accurate information". Gramuglia wrote that the series "capture[d] the tension and anxieties of the era beautifully", while Alverson called its portrayal of Victorian England "lovingly detailed".

The plot was met with generally warm reactions. Silverman felt that the manga distinguished itself from similar works through its serious depiction of prejudice, and Santilli commended it as one that "pushe[d] the boundaries" of series that would typically be licensed in English. Brittany Vincent of Otaku USA was more hesitant, opining that the storyline resembled others in the genre despite being "pleasant enough". Erica Friedman of Okazu described the story as a "bit melodramatic" but still enjoyable.

The series' characters received mostly positive comments. Sara Smith of The Graphic Library praised the relationship between Hanako and Alice as "so sweet and pure that it's refreshing". Vincent commented positively on the relationship as well, praising the "delicately written" characters. Gramuglia offered a mixed review; although he called the main protagonists "excellent foils" for each other, he felt that they were often overshadowed by the setting.

The artwork was commended by multiple reviewers. Gramuglia described the manga as "bleeding historical atmosphere" with its scenery, while Santilli enjoyed its "richly detailed" drawings. Smith wrote that the "illustrations fully explore the lushness of the time period", particularly in their depictions of clothing, and opined that they were an attractive part of the story. Vincent also spoke positively of the artwork's historical immersion, stating that it did a "fantastic job" of showing its Victorian setting.
