= Oltu stone =

Type of jet

Oltu stone (Turkish: Oltu taşı) is a kind of jet found in the region around Oltu town within Erzurum Province, eastern Turkey. The organic substance is used as semi-precious gemstone in manufacturing jewelry.

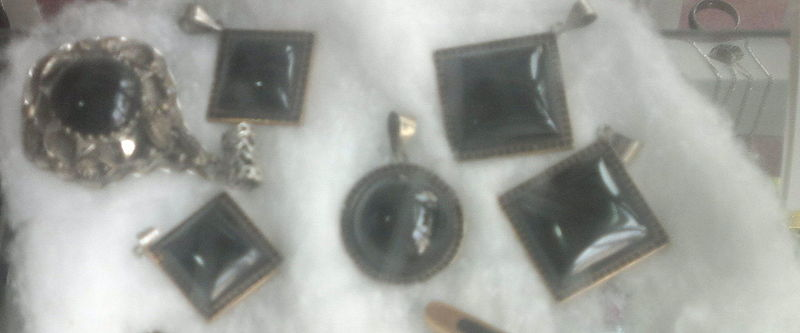
Oltu stone pendants

== Location and extraction ==
Oltu stone, sometimes called also "Erzurum stone", is principally mined in the villages northeast of Oltu town, around Tutlu Dağı (Yasak Dağ) as well as in Alatarla, Hankaskışla and Çataksu villages. The mountainous, rough region with steep slopes is 1,600–1,800 m (5,200–5,900 ft) high.

Oltu stone beds are formed when fossilized trees are subject to diastrophism resulting in folding. Beds of this organic substance are 70–80 cm (28–31 in) in thickness. Extraction is done by digging narrow tunnels and shafts below ground. There are around 600 quarries in the region.

== Properties ==
It is a very dense mineral-like substance of the nature of coal that does not demonstrate crystallinity. It generally comes in black, but can also be velvet-black, blackish brown, grey or greenish.

Oltu stone's most interesting characteristic is its softness when excavated. It only begins to harden when exposed to the air. For this reason, it can be carved very easily.

It attracts, by way of static electricity, light substances like dust when rubbed. Oltu stone burns bursting in flames, and leaves ash behind.

To distinguish true Oltu stone from the artificial jet, it is rubbed against unglazed porcelain. Real Oltu stone will leave a chocolate brown streak. The structure of Oltu stone, which is remarkably like that of wood, can be seen under magnification.

== Jewelry ==
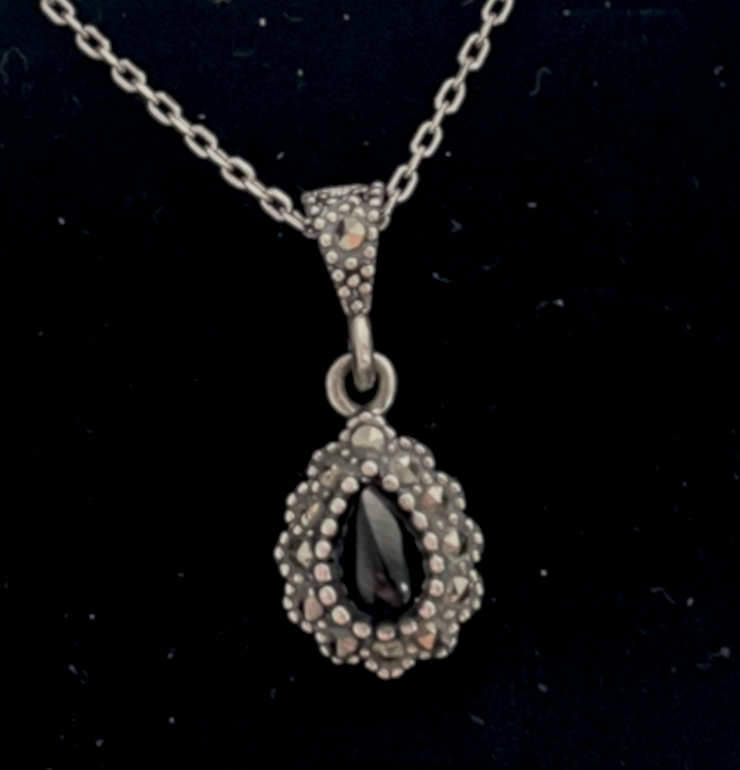
An oltu stone pendant from Erzurum

Oltu stone is cut or carved in desired form and polished to manufacture various decorative ornaments and utensils like rings, earrings, necklaces, bracelets, tie pins, smoking pipes, cigarette holders, and prayer beads.

These products can be purchased from multiple stores in the Erzurum province. One place to buy oltu stone jewelry is the market in the Erzurum city center.
