= Mourning jewellery =

Piece of jewelry worn during, or associated with, mourning

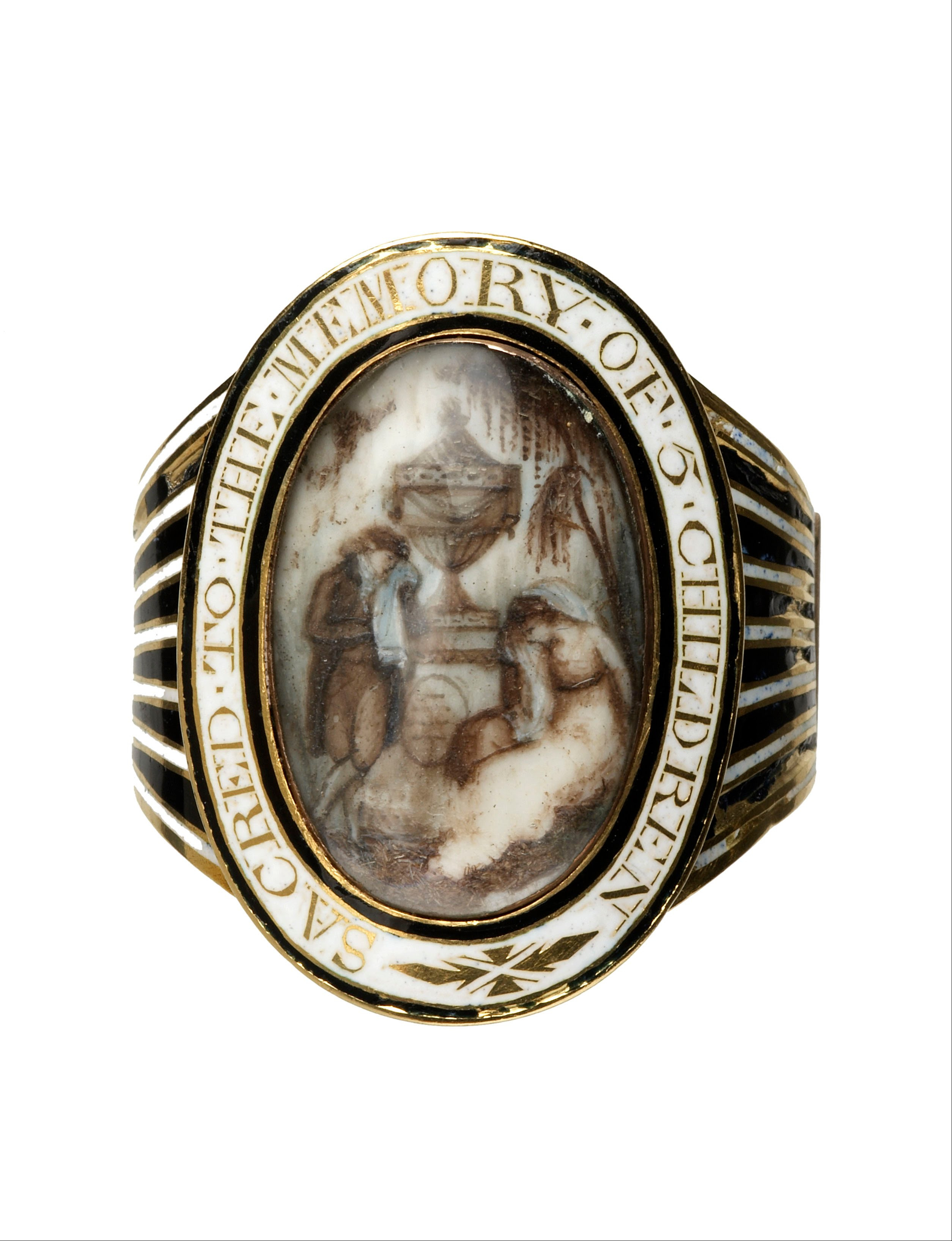
Mourning ring (1800) dedicated to the memory of deceased children

Mourning jewellery is jewellery that is worn as a sign of mourning or loss. In the western world, the wearing of mourning jewellery was traditionally part of the social conventions surrounding mourning and mourning attire. In the 21st century, mourning jewellery has become primarily a way of individually expressing loss, or creating a tangible object to commemorate a loved one.

In principle, any type of jewellery can be mourning jewellery: there are examples of rings, bracelets, necklaces, tiaras, brooches, pendants, lockets, earrings, tie pins, cufflinks, and watch chains. Mourning jewellery is traditionally characterised by the use of materials such as jet, pearls and hair, the colour black, and symbolism that refers to death, loss and the afterlife.

Jewellery specifically intended as mourning jewellery emerged from the 16th century onwards. The popularity of mourning jewellery reached its peak in the second half of the 19th century; from the beginning of the 20th century interest in mourning jewellery rapidly declined. In the 21st century, there has been a modest revival in the form of cremation jewellery.

== Different types of mourning jewellery ==
Within Western tradition, four types of mourning jewellery can be distinguished:

- Reliquary jewellery contains some type of physical remains of the deceased, such as hair, a tooth or ashes.
- Personalised mourning jewellery (also called imprinted jewellery) refers to a deceased person, e.g. by means of an engraved name, date of death or fingerprint. A locket with a photograph is also a personalised piece of mourning jewellery.
- Heirloom jewellery is jewellery that was worn by the deceased and inherited by the wearer. This also includes jewellery made from (parts of) inherited jewellery, like a pendant made from a wedding ring.
- Black jewellery expresses the wearer's mourning through its colour. It does not refer to a deceased person, and was not always specifically designed as mourning jewellery.

In principle, any jewellery can be mourning jewellery; there are examples of rings, bracelets, necklaces, tiaras, brooches, pendants, lockets, earrings, tie pins, cufflinks and watch chains being used as mourning jewellery.

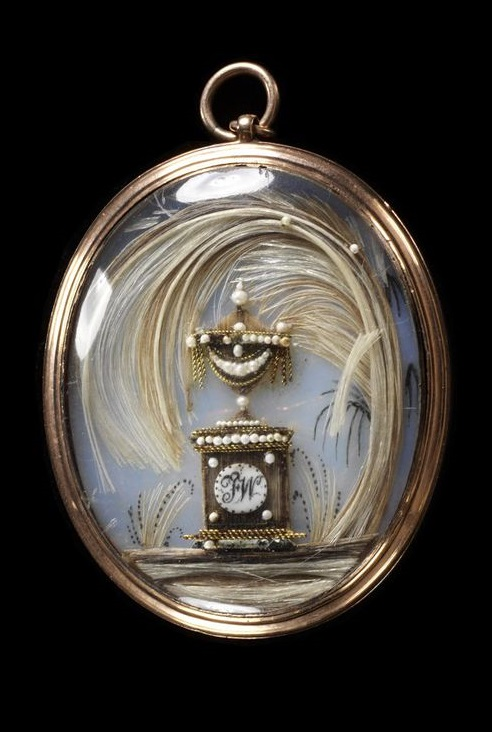
Locket, c. 1790

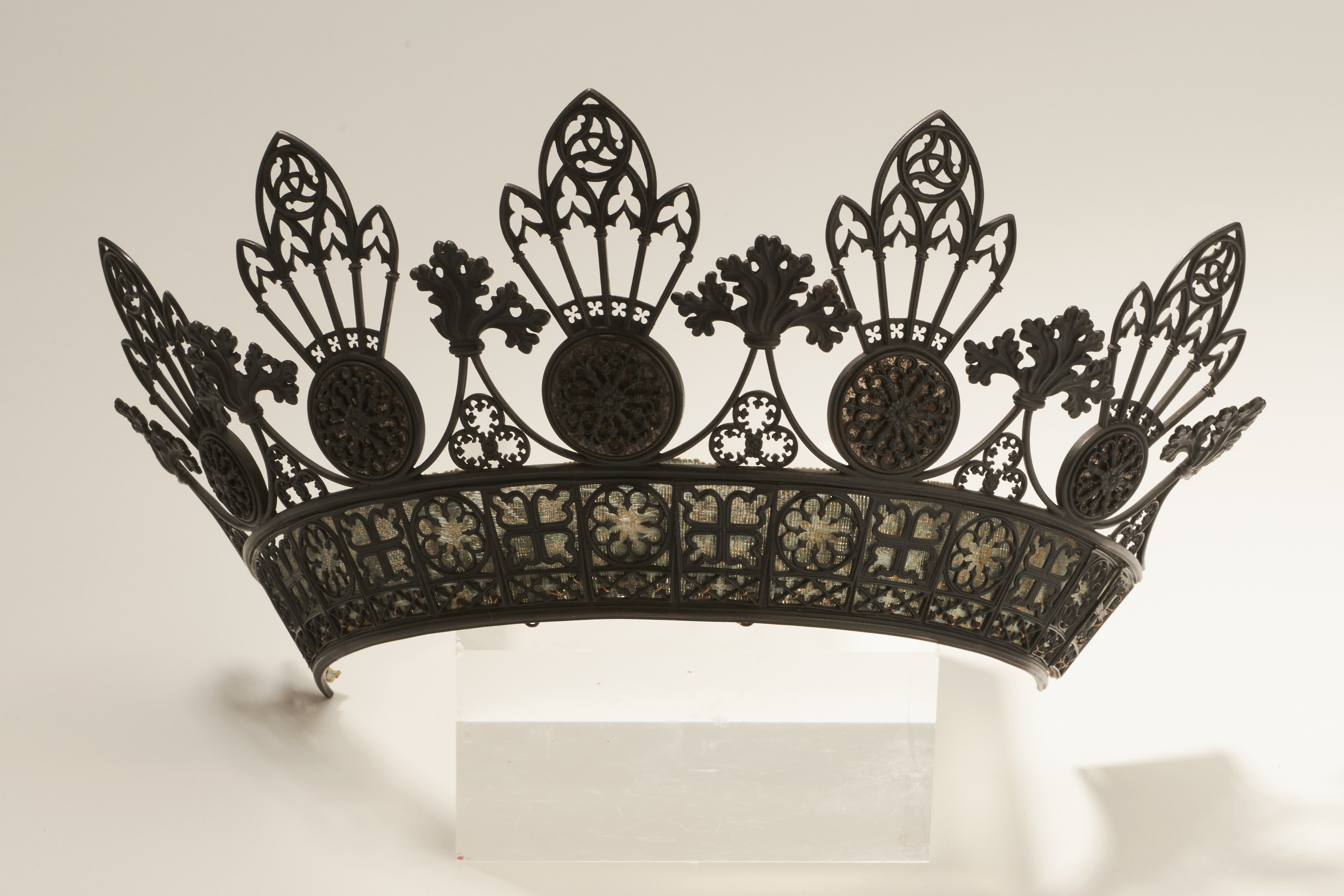
Cast iron (Berlin iron) tiara, c. 1825

Bracelet made of hair in the shape of the ouroboros, c. 1830

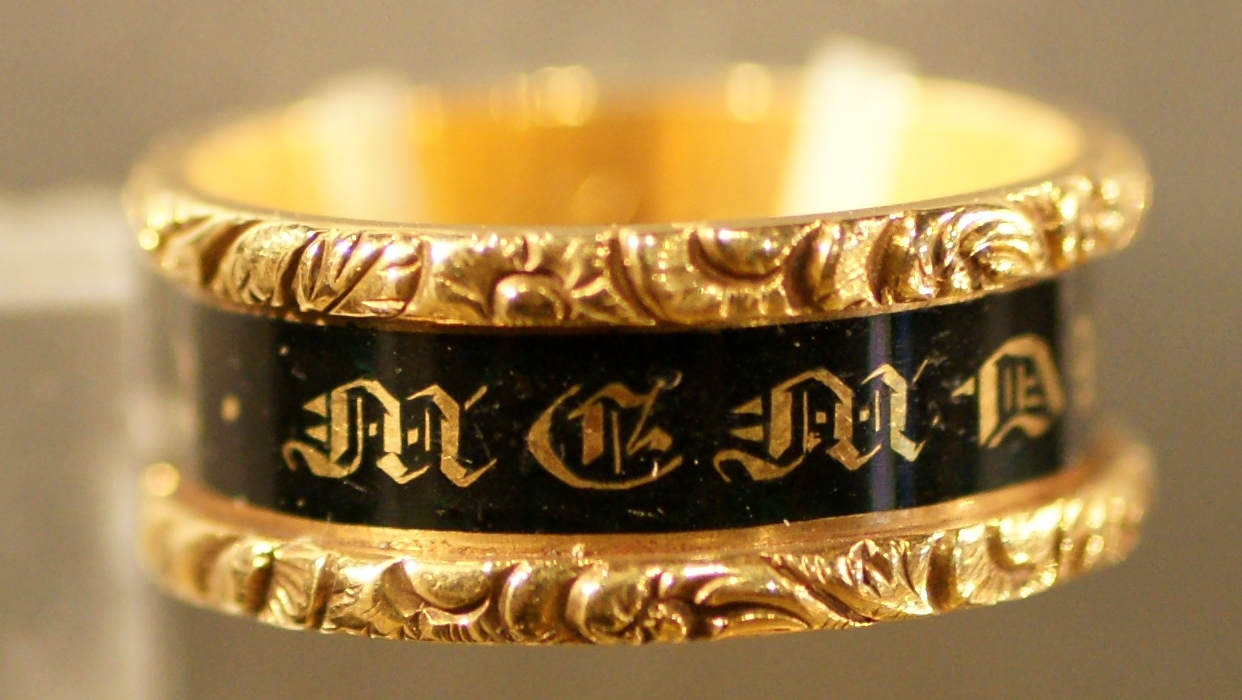
Mourning ring, c. 1850?

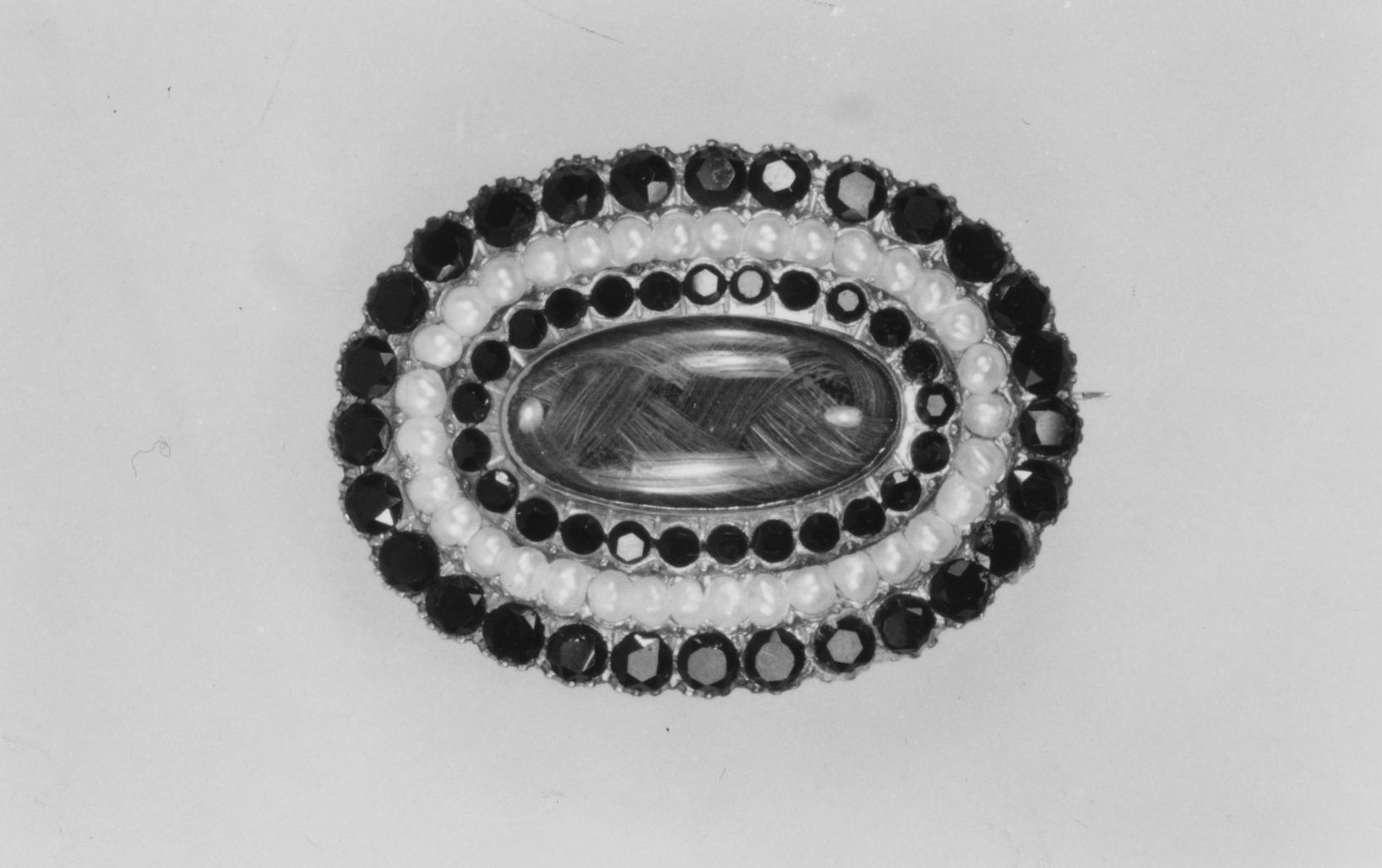
Mourning brooch, 1862

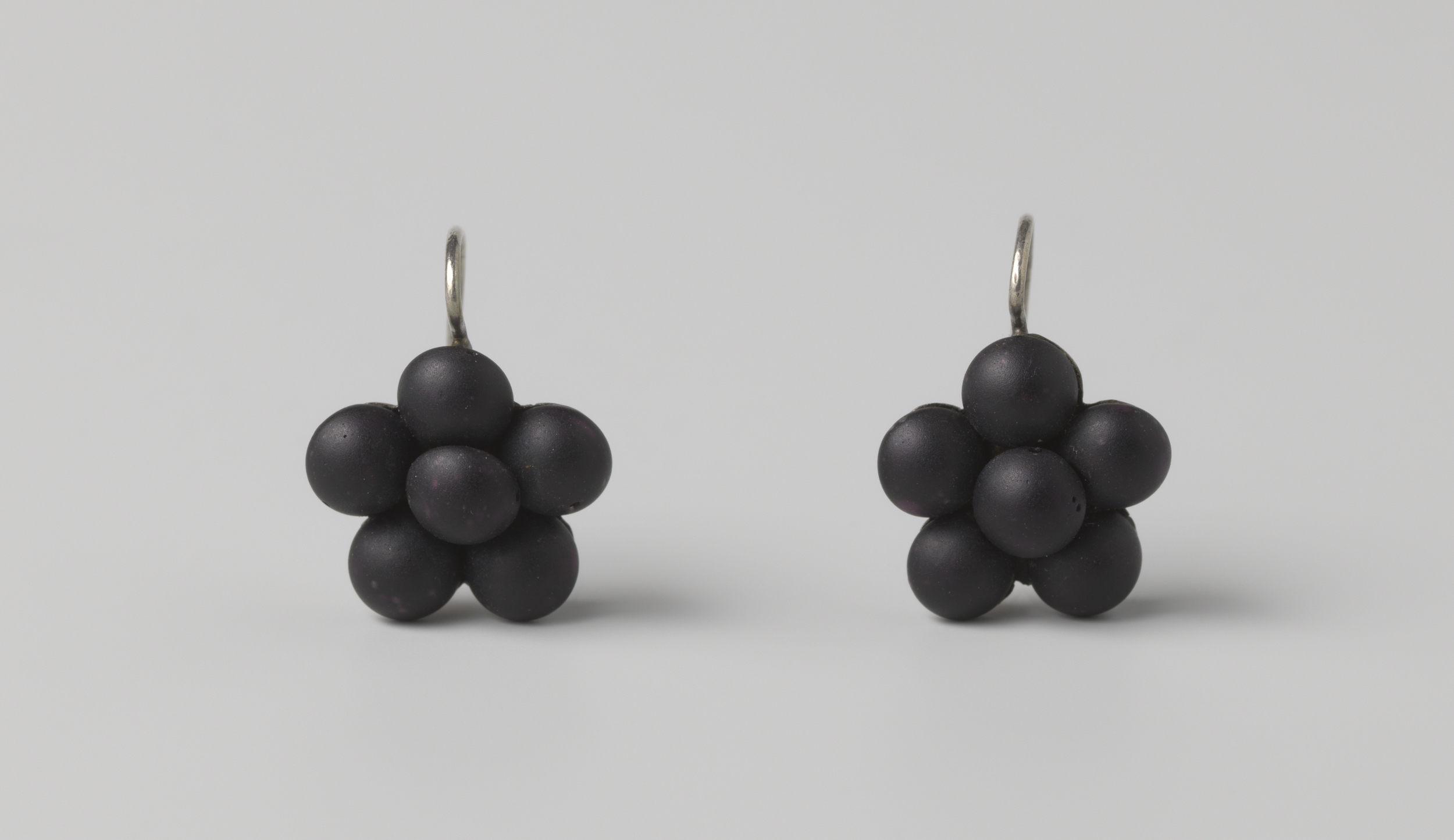
Mourning earrings, c. 1880

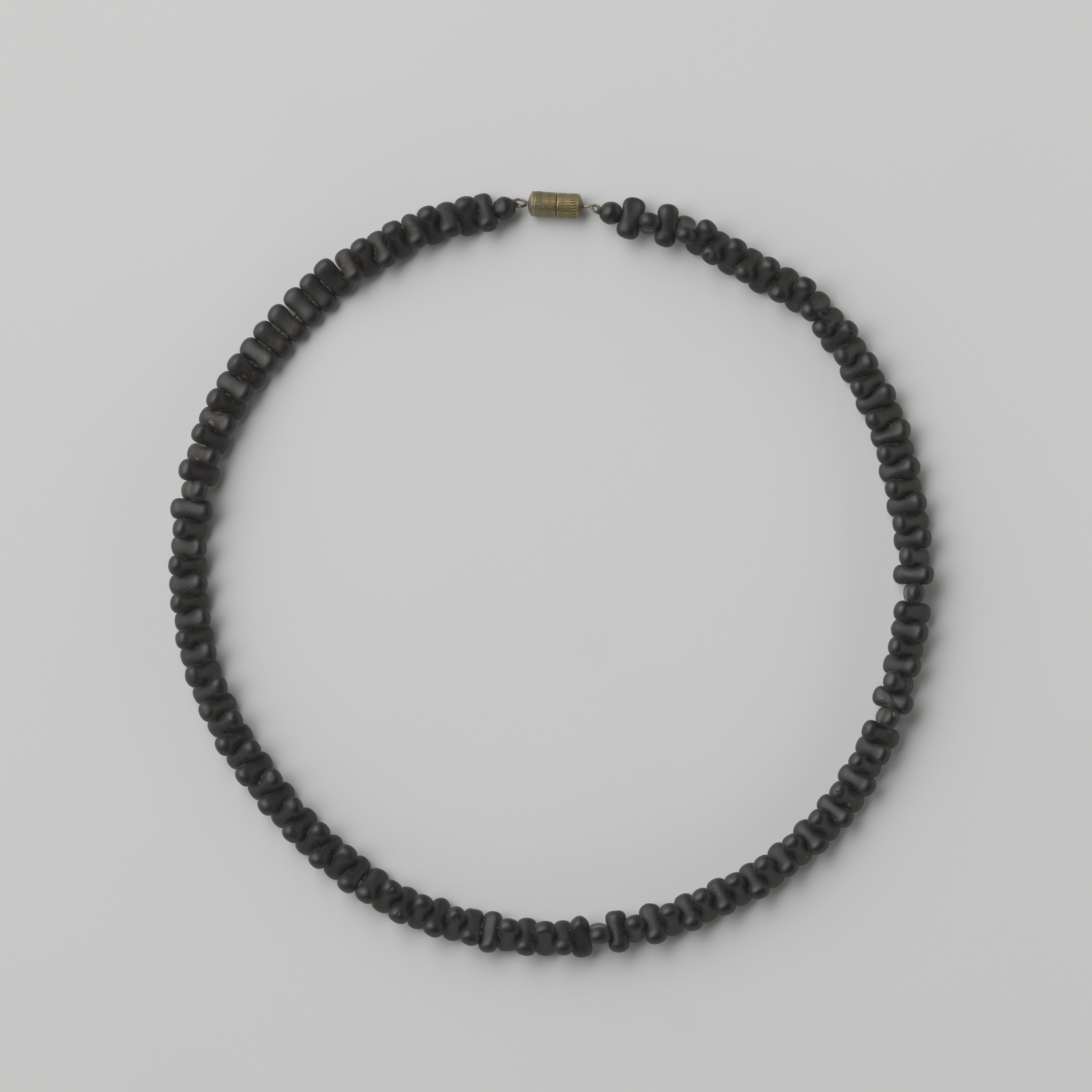
Mourning necklace, c. 1890

In the past, mourning jewellery had social functions that went beyond expressing or sharing grief. Giving or receiving mourning jewellery was a confirmation of power relations, family ties and social networks. In addition, mourning jewellery – like all jewellery – could be a status symbol. Mourning jewellery also served as a reminder of human mortality and transience (“memento mori”) in general. In the 21st century, mourning jewellery is primarily a way of expressing loss individually, or creating a tangible memory of a loved one who has passed away.

== Jewellery during mourning ==
Mourning jewellery was worn as a sign of mourning. This did not mean that, traditionally, all mourning jewellery could be worn with mourning attire at every phase of the formal process of mourning. During the first phase of mourning (full mourning), anything that sparkled or shone was forbidden; apart from a wedding ring, it was preferable not to wear any jewellery at all during full mourning. In the next phase of mourning, jewellery made of unpolished – i.e. non-shiny – jet or onyx was permitted, as were pearls and diamonds in black settings. In the final phase of mourning, the rules regarding the wearing of jewellery were less restrictive..

== Materials used ==
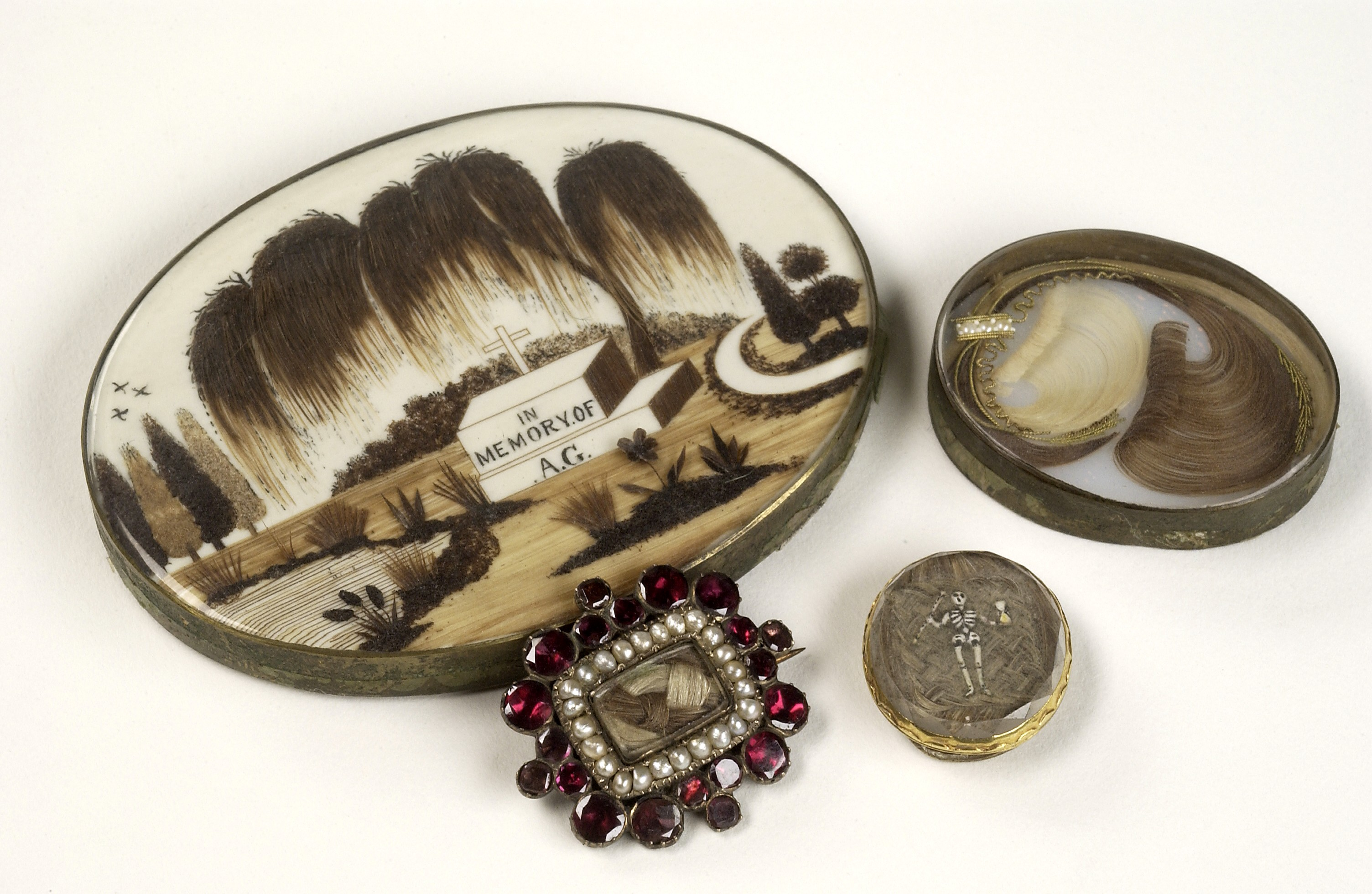
Mourning broches containing hair

The most common Western mourning colours are black and white. Materials in these colours were preferred for mourning jewellery: jet, onyx, pearls, diamonds, moonstone, black or white enamel, silver, steel and cast iron (Berlin iron), black glass or bone. In the final stages of mourning, purple was permitted, and amethysts, for example, were also be used in mourning jewellery.

=== Hair ===
From the 18th century onwards, hair was increasingly used in mourning jewellery. Initially, this involved a single lock of the deceased's hair behind glass or quartz in a pendant or medallion. Gradually, “hairwork” became an increasingly important component, until by the end of the 19th century it had become characteristic of mourning jewellery. Finely cut hair was incorporated into enamelled images and miniatures, and longer hair was used to braid bracelets and necklaces or weave patterns.

=== Jet ===
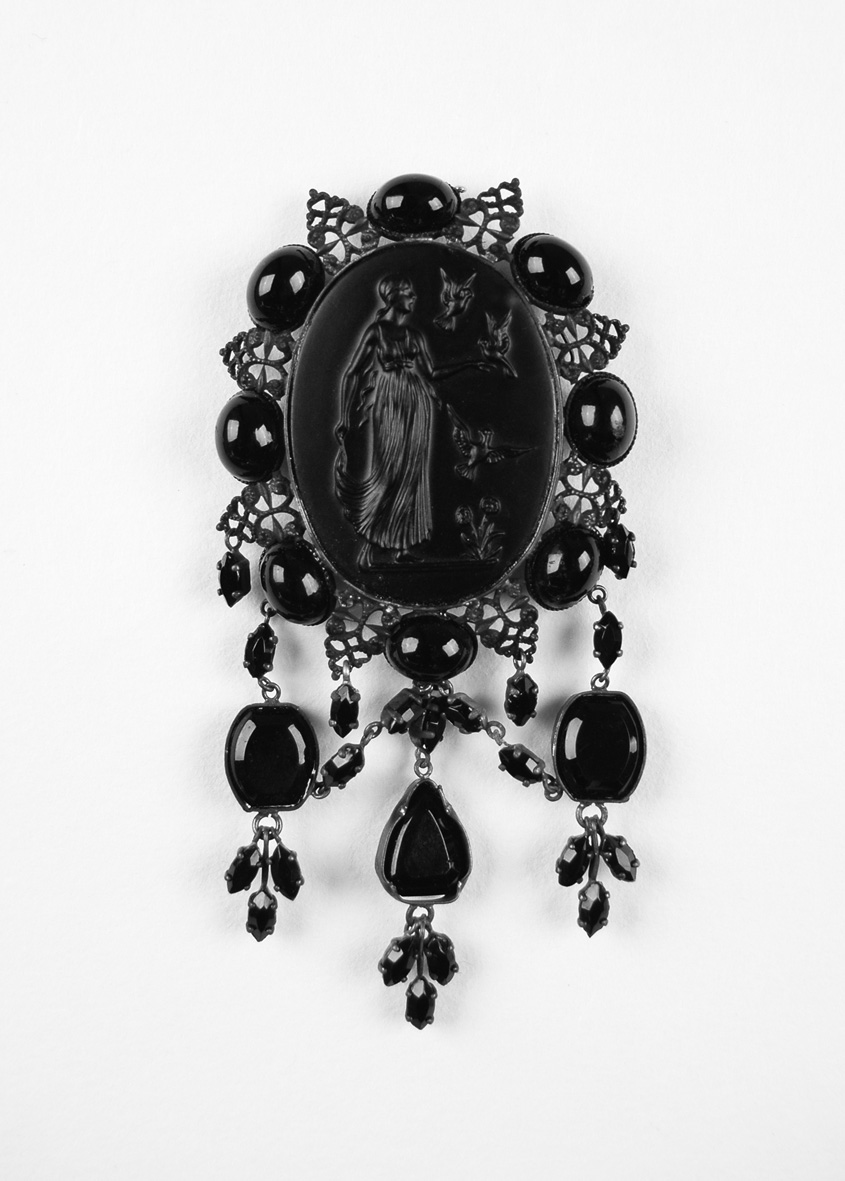
Mourning jewel made of jet, 19th century

Jet (deep black fossilised wood) was one of the most commonly used materials for mourning jewellery; there actually was a jet industry. Around 1870, in and around the English town of Whitby, where the best quality jet was found, 1,400 people were employed in jet processing in 200 different workshops. Due to the high demand for jet, substitute products appeared on the market, such as ebonite, an early plastic. Cut black glass was also a popular and affordable alternative, known as French jet.

In the 21st century, jewellery designers and artists use alternative materials for mourning jewellery, sometimes including perishable materials.

== Imagery and symbolism ==
Medieval memento mori jewellery used images and symbolism that made explicit references to mortality and transience: skulls, skeletons, coffins, urns, hourglasses and scythes. During the 17th and 18th centuries, motifs such as weeping willows, images of women mourning by an urn or grave, and the ouroboros were also used for mourning jewellery. Christian symbolism was common: crosses, Bibles, angels or anchors. Miniaturists drew elaborate and detailed images in sepia or ink.

In the Victorian era, the imagery of mourning jewellery was expanded to include images of trees and plants with symbolic meanings. Cypress and yew were traditionally associated with death and cemeteries. Lilies symbolised purity, ivy symbolised immortality, and ears of corn (the harvest) symbolised a life fulfilled. Violets and forget-me-nots symbolised remembrance.

After the introduction of photography, portraits of the deceased were incorporated into pendants and medallions. These included photographs taken after death, especially in the case of children.

== History ==
=== Middle Ages ===
The first mourning jewellery consisted of jewellery that had belonged to the deceased and was given to the bereaved as a keepsake. It was not created as mourning jewellery, but got that function. In the Middle Ages, memento mori jewellery also became popular. These were pieces of jewellery that drew attention to the transience of life and the proximity of death. These pieces of jewellery were not specifically made for mourning either, but were often worn as mourning jewellery by the bereaved.

=== 1500-1850 ===
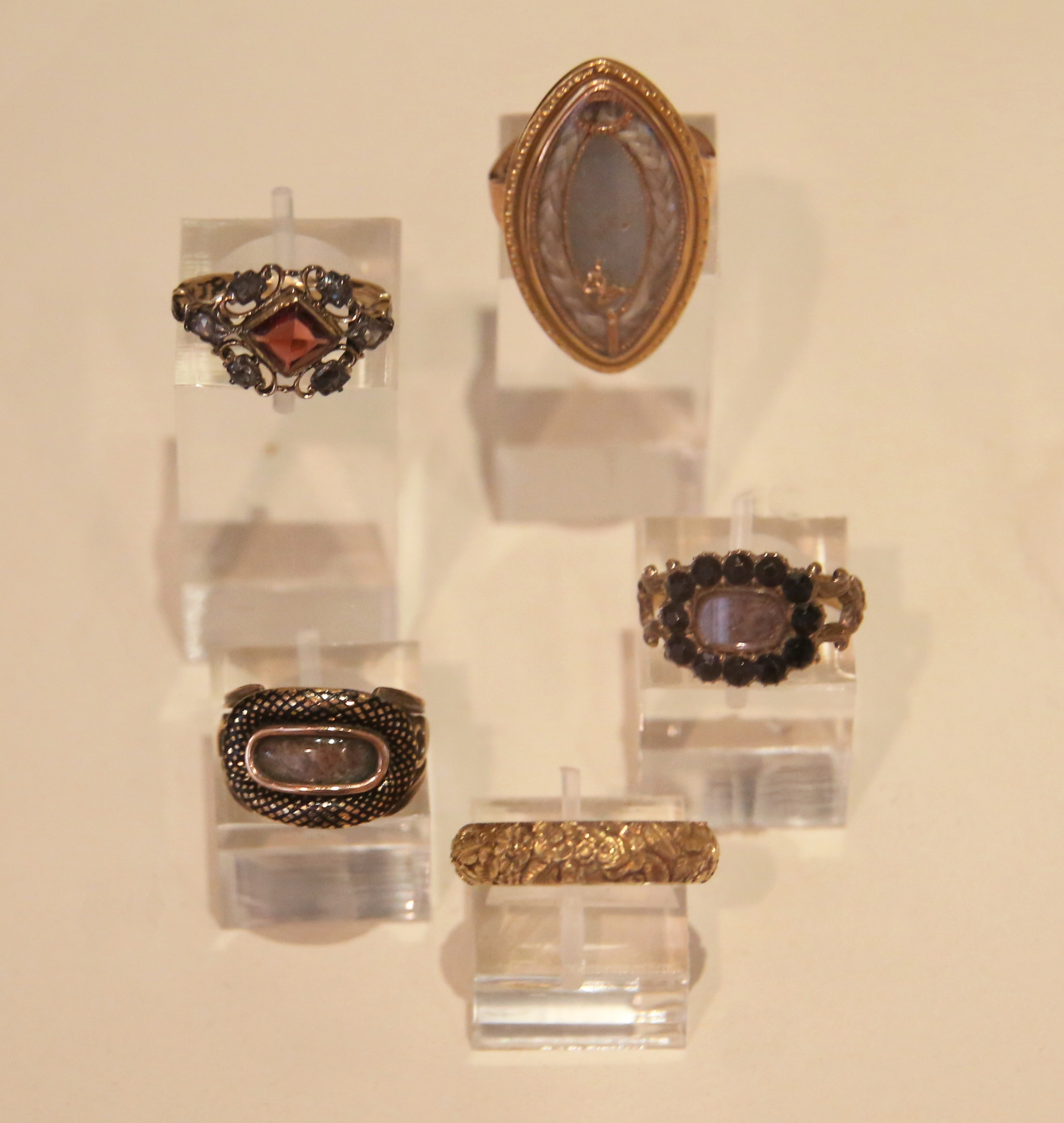
Five mourning rings dated 1745-1810

The first jewellery designed specifically for mourning appeared in the 16th century. In the 17th century, names or dates of death began to be added to mourning jewellery, making it more personal. The development of new ways to commemorate the dead was also linked to the Reformation. Previously, the emphasis in commemorating the deceased had been on holding masses for the salvation of their souls. Mourning rings became particularly popular. Initially, these were rings that had belonged to the deceased. It was a sign of status if a family could afford to give these away. During the 17th century, it became customary for people to leave money in their wills to purchase and distribute mourning rings; women in particular did this.

In addition to rings, pendants and bracelets were now also used as mourning jewellery. The jewellery became more refined and detailed, with an increasing number of different images and symbols being used. By the early 19th century, mourning jewellery had become a widespread way of commemorating the deceased. Technical and economic developments at the time made jewellery cheaper, with more people able to afford mourning jewellery.

=== 1850 - 1914 ===
The popularity of mourning jewellery increased rapidly in the second half of the 19th century. This first happened in the United Kingdom, where Queen Victoria made prolonged and demonstrative mourning the norm after the death of her husband Prince Albert in 1861. In this period, the focus of mourning gradually shifted from the deceased to the mourner. Women played an important role in this new, more public way of mourning.

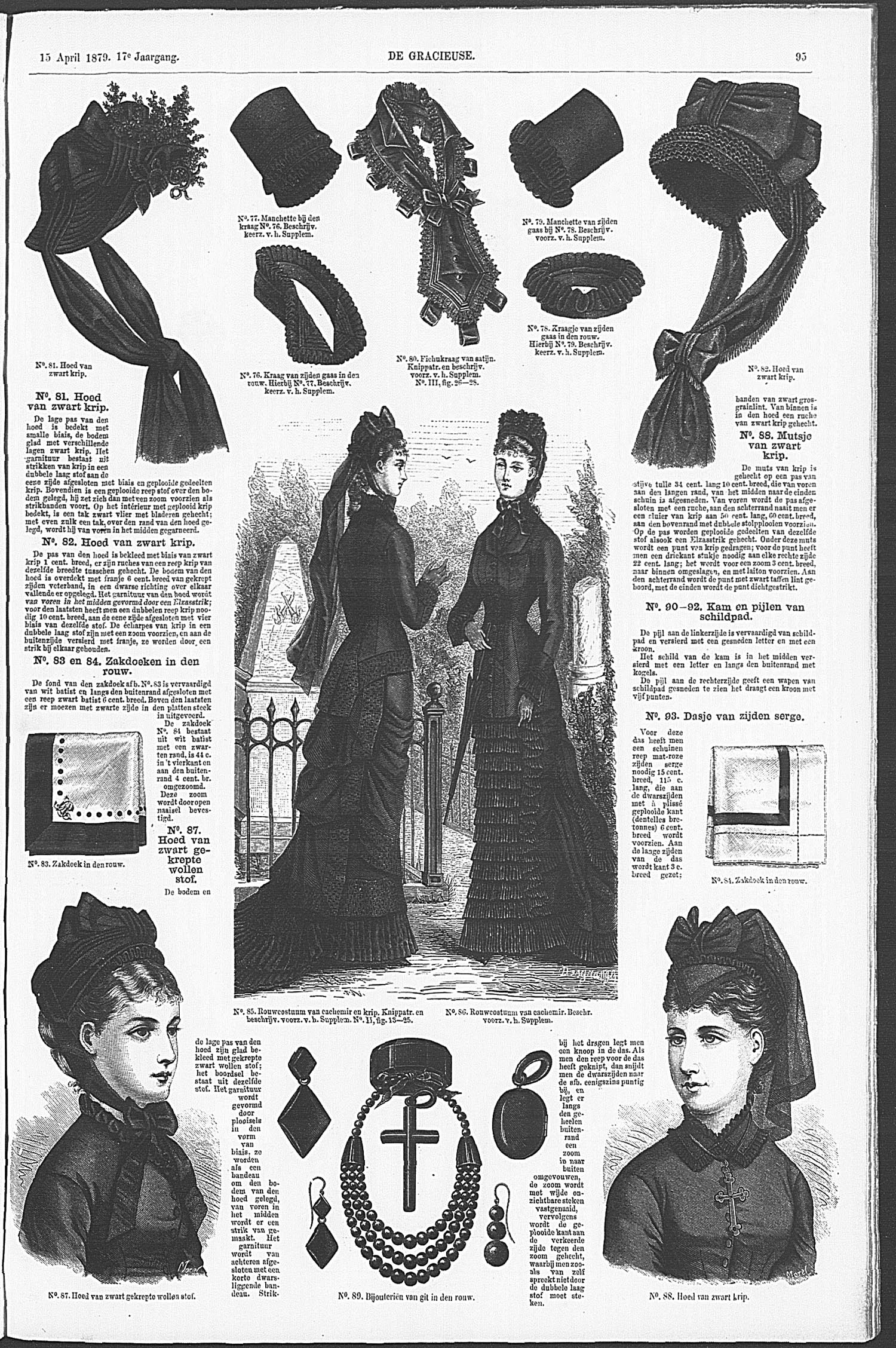
Advertisement in the Dutch fashion magazine Gracieuse (1879) for mourning attire, including jet jewellery (bottom centre)

The etiquette surrounding the wearing of mourning jewellery (what was acceptable at each stage of mourning) was just as strict as that for mourning attire and the mourning process in general. For example, wearing polished jewellery during full mourning was a serious faux pas for which someone would be chastised.

With the advent of photography, the craft of painting mourning miniatures disappeared. Mourning became fashion-dependent; mourning clothing and accessories changed every year and every season.

=== 20th and 21st century ===
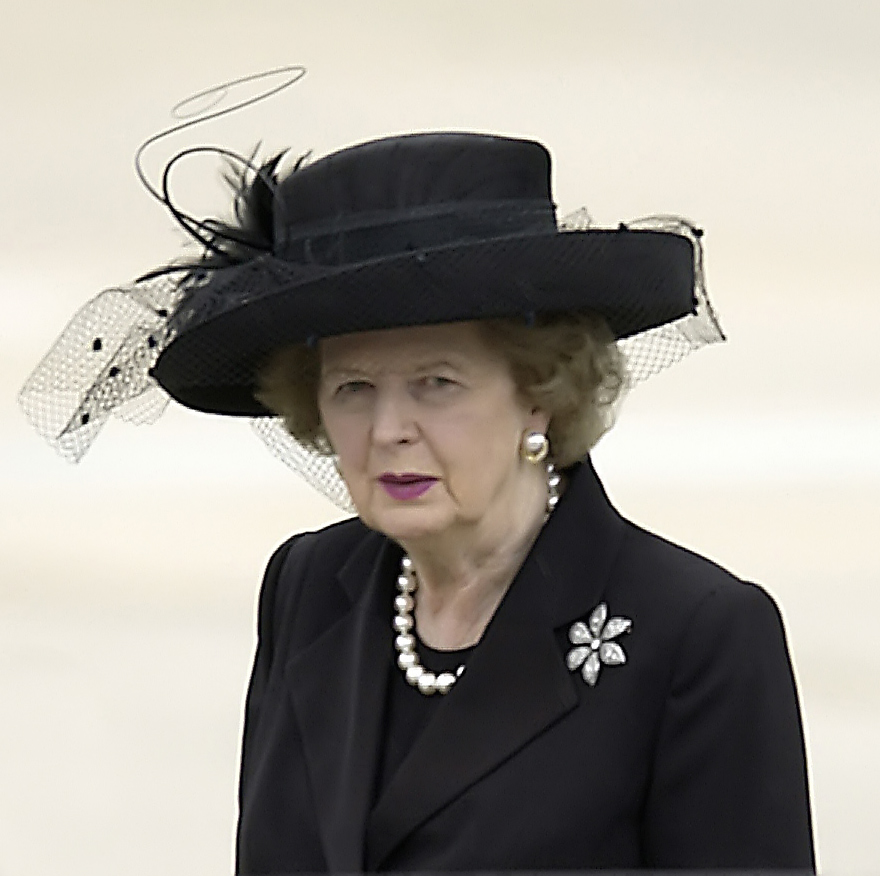
Margaret Thatcher at the funeral of former president Ronald Reagan, wearing traditional white and silver coloured jewellery.

The First World War marked the end of ostentatious mourning culture. Mourning jewellery also disappeared from the scene. What remains is the custom of wearing only black or silver coloured jewellery, pearls or white stones at a very formal or traditional funeral.

At the end of the 20th century, there was a revival in the wearing of mourning jewellery, particularly reliquary jewellery. The ashes of the cremated are incorporated into jewellery, e.g. by storing a small amount of ashes in a compartment of a ring or pendant, or by incorporating ashes into synthetic stones. Jewellery is also made in which the gases released when human ashes are heated are captured, as a last breath of the deceased.

At the beginning of the 21st century, jewellery designers are once again inspired by memento mori jewellery and are creating contemporary versions of jewellery that refer to loss, death and mourning.
