= Berlin iron jewellery =

19th-century German jewellery

Berlin iron jewellery refers to articles of cast-iron jewellery that were made during the early 19th century in Germany.

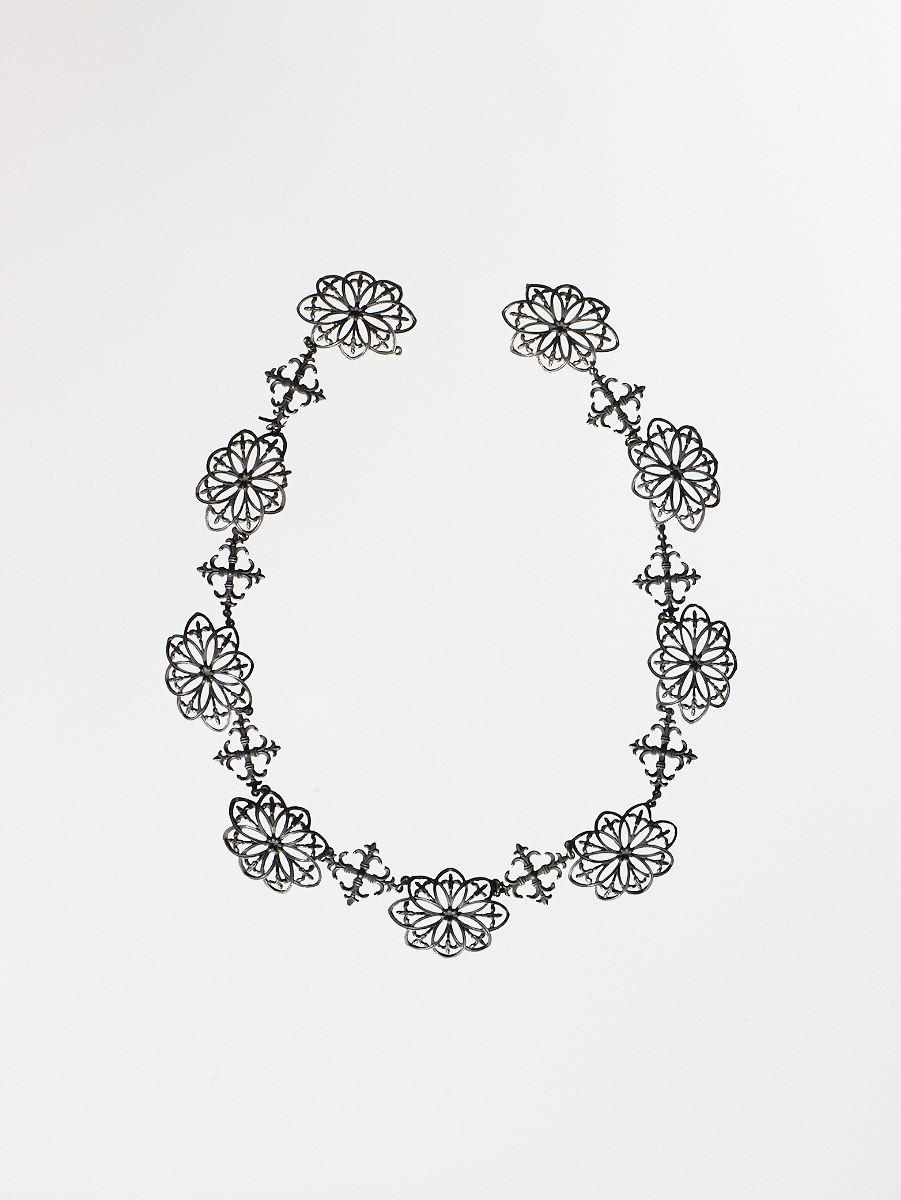
Example of the type of jewellery received by women in exchange for gold used to support the Napoleonic Wars. From the Birmingham Museum of Art.

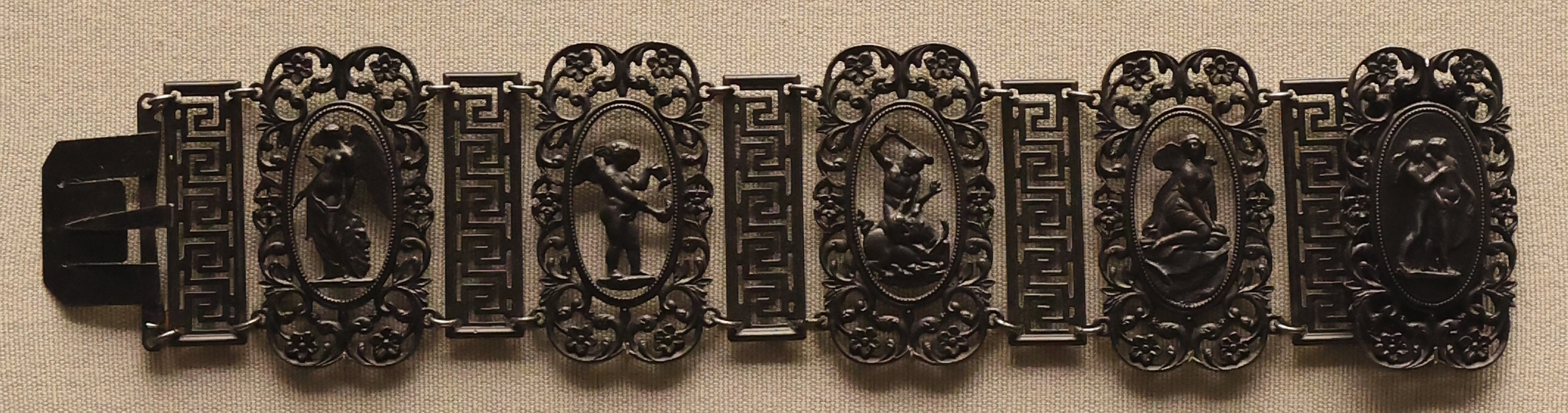
An example of a Berlin iron bracelet

== History ==
Prior to production beginning in Berlin very similar jewellery was being produced in Gliwice and France.

The roots of Berlin iron jewellery in Berlin can be traced back to the establishment of the Königliche Eisengiesserei bei Berlin or Royal Berlin Foundry in 1804. The Royal Berlin Foundry started with the production of iron goods such as vases, knife stands, candelabra, bowls, plaques and medallions, as well as more commercial articles such as fences, bridges and garden furniture. The first jewellery items, such as long chains with cast links, were produced in 1806. Later, necklaces consisting of medallions and joined with links and wirework mesh were manufactured. When Napoleon took Berlin in 1806, the moulds appear to have been taken back to France, where further production took place for some years.

The production of iron jewellery reached its peak between 1813 and 1815, when the Prussian royal family urged all citizens to contribute their gold and silver jewellery towards funding the uprising against Napoleon during the War of Liberation. In return the people were given iron jewellery such as brooches and finger rings, often with the inscription Gold gab ich für Eisen (I gave gold for iron), or Für das Wohl des Vaterlands (For the welfare of our country / fatherland), or with a portrait of Frederick William III of Prussia on the back. Until then iron jewellery had only been worn as a symbol of mourning (because of its black colour acquired by treating the castings with linseed cakes) and was worth too little to be alluring, but suddenly it became a symbol of patriotism and loyalty and with its obvious aesthetic appeal, became popular overnight.

The numbers of pieces produced started declining after 1850, but still continued to be manufactured until the end of the century when the fashion ended. Around the start of the decline or just before there appears to have been a shift towards designing the jewellery in a more gothic style.

It is not widely known, but in 1916 another, similar attempt was made in Germany to promote iron jewellery and to fund the German share in the First World War. This was done by exchanging gold jewellery for an iron medallion inscribed with the words: Gold gab ich zur Wehr, Eisen nahm ich zur Ehr (I give gold towards our defence effort and I take iron for honour). This attempt, however, was not as successful. Today, Berlin iron jewellery are collector's items and true pieces are usually found in museums or private collections.

Collections of Berlin iron jewellery are held by among others Musée des Beaux-Arts de Rouen, Neues Museum, and the Victoria and Albert Museum.

== Styles ==
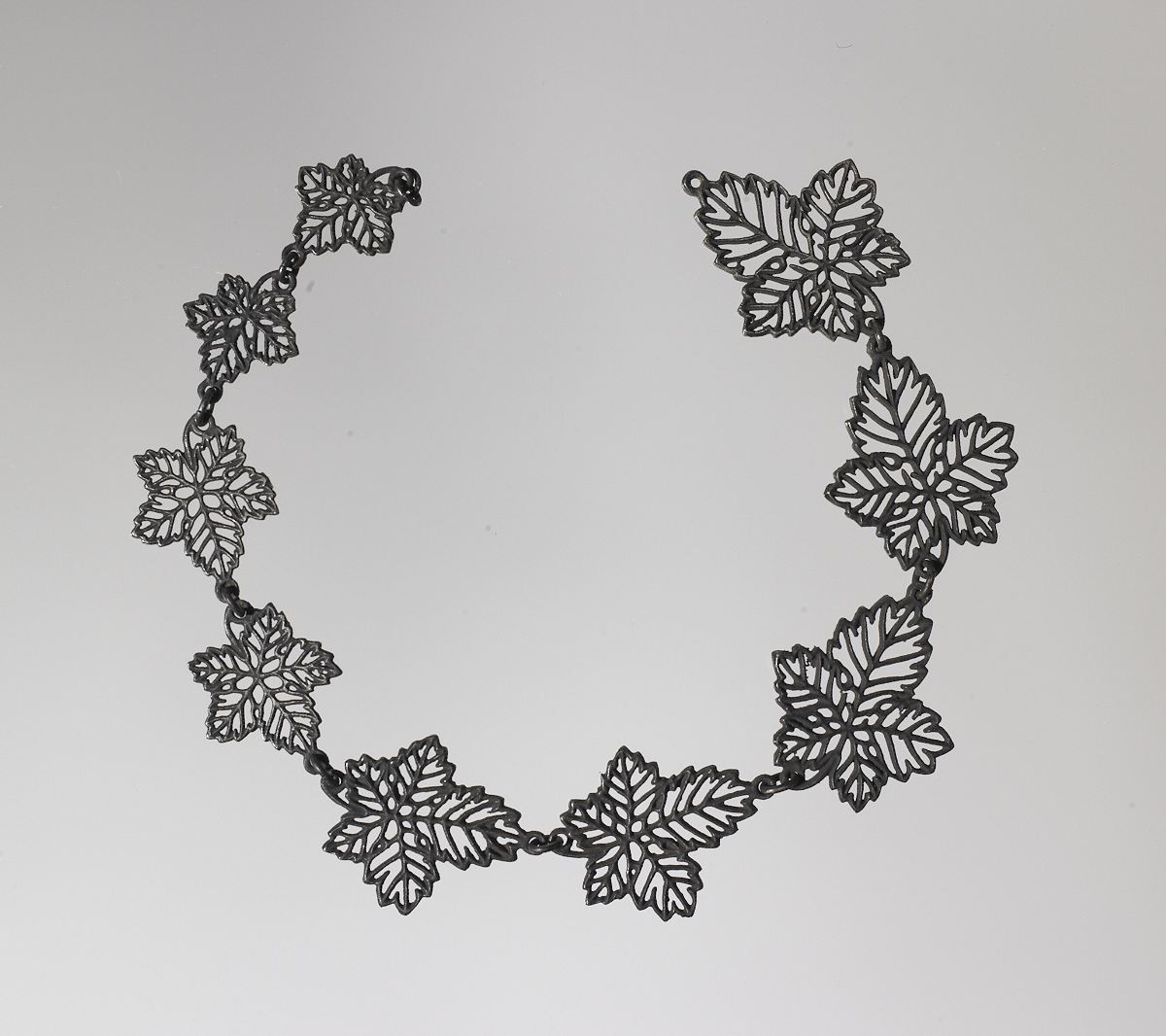
Cast-iron necklace. Held at the Birmingham Museum of Art.

At first the style of the designs, especially during the Napoleonic period, was Neo-Classical, incorporating plenty of fretwork and moulded replicas of cameos.

From 1810 the style changed slightly to a miniature form of Gothic Revival, incorporating the pointed arch and rose widow of the Gothic cathedral, combined with less austere, more naturalistic motifs such as butterflies, trefoils (a plant with three leaflets such as clover) and vine leaves.

The jewellery has a very fine, detailed and lacy appearance. Berlin iron jewellery was lacquered black to prevent the iron from rusting and to enhance its purpose as mourning jewellery. Only a few rare examples were decorated with fine gold, silver settings or polished steel. Some were also set with medallions, imitating the Greek classical scenes on some of the jasperware made by the famous potter Josiah Wedgwood (1730–1795), or the portrait medallions of contemporaries made by James Tassie (1735–1799).

Between 1808 and 1848 the Royal Berlin Factory marketed plaques as new year gifts. Known as Neujahr-plaketten (new year reliefs) they generally featured some event relevant to the year in question.

== Manufacturing ==
For such intricate detail and thin-sectioned castings to be produced as were done with Berlin iron jewellery, a very pure iron which contained up to 0.7% phosphorus was used. This was done to make the iron slightly more fluid than what it would be when normally molten. Although this type of phosphoric cast iron is rather hard and brittle, strength is not the main purpose of the metal when it is used in jewellery. The molten iron was cast into metal chill moulds.

== See also ==
- Cut steel jewellery
