= Victorian jewellery =

Jewellery produced in the Victorian era (1837–1901)

Victorian jewellery originated in England; it was produced during the Victoria era, when Queen Victoria reigned from 1837 to 1901. Queen Victoria was an influential figure who established the different trends in Victorian jewellery. The amount of jewellery acquired throughout the era established a person's identity and status.

Victorian jewellery included a diverse variety of styles and fashions. These phases can be categorised into three distinct periods: the Romantic, Grand, and Aesthetic periods.

== Identity and status ==
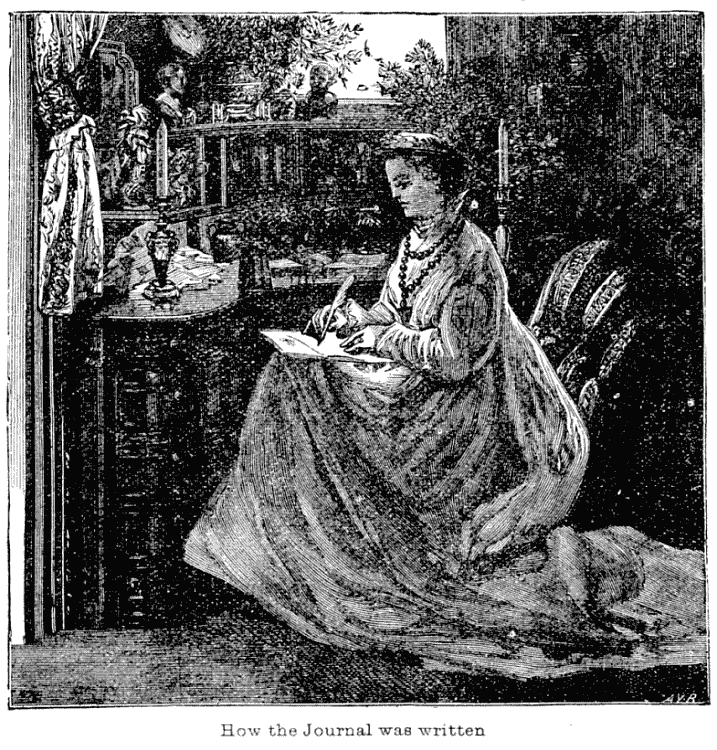
Victorian woman wearing jewellery

The role of jewellery within Victorian culture was important in determining a person's identity and social status. The Western world has often objectified jewels as aesthetic objects that are highly desired. Jewels are much sought after due to their association with respectability, class prestige, monetary value and current trends within society. Additionally, given its status, jewellery was viewed as a commodity that contributed to Victorian capitalism. A person's status in society could be demonstrated by wearing jewellery. Consumerism was crucial in prompting the purchasing of different types of jewels, which were able to determine a person's wealth and social class. Due to the financial value of jewels, lower classes could not afford to keep up with this fashion trend. If a woman did not wear jewellery, it was assumed it was because she was unable to afford it due to her position in the working class. Due to such a large demand for particular jewels, rapid manufacturing assisted in producing jewels. The imitation of these particular jewels were made more affordable for middle class people. During the Victorian era, jewels were mostly worn by women. It was unconventional for men to wear jewels, given jewels were considered a feminine object. Women that wore jewels were considered an object of beauty. Although men did not wear jewels, men commonly gifted jewels to a woman they admired.

== Different periods of Victorian jewellery ==
Jewellery throughout the Victorian era remains prominent for its design and composition. The production of jewellery throughout the Victorian era was distinct, as it marked change and innovative practices through the use of new machinery. Machinery allowed fast production of jewellery and replaced work that could be done by an individual. The collection of jewellery created throughout the Victorian era was diverse, for this reason Victorian jewellery can be divided into three distinct periods: The Romantic period, the Grand period and the Aesthetic Period. Each period consists of key features. These features consisted of different sources of inspiration, different materials and prominent types of jewellery.

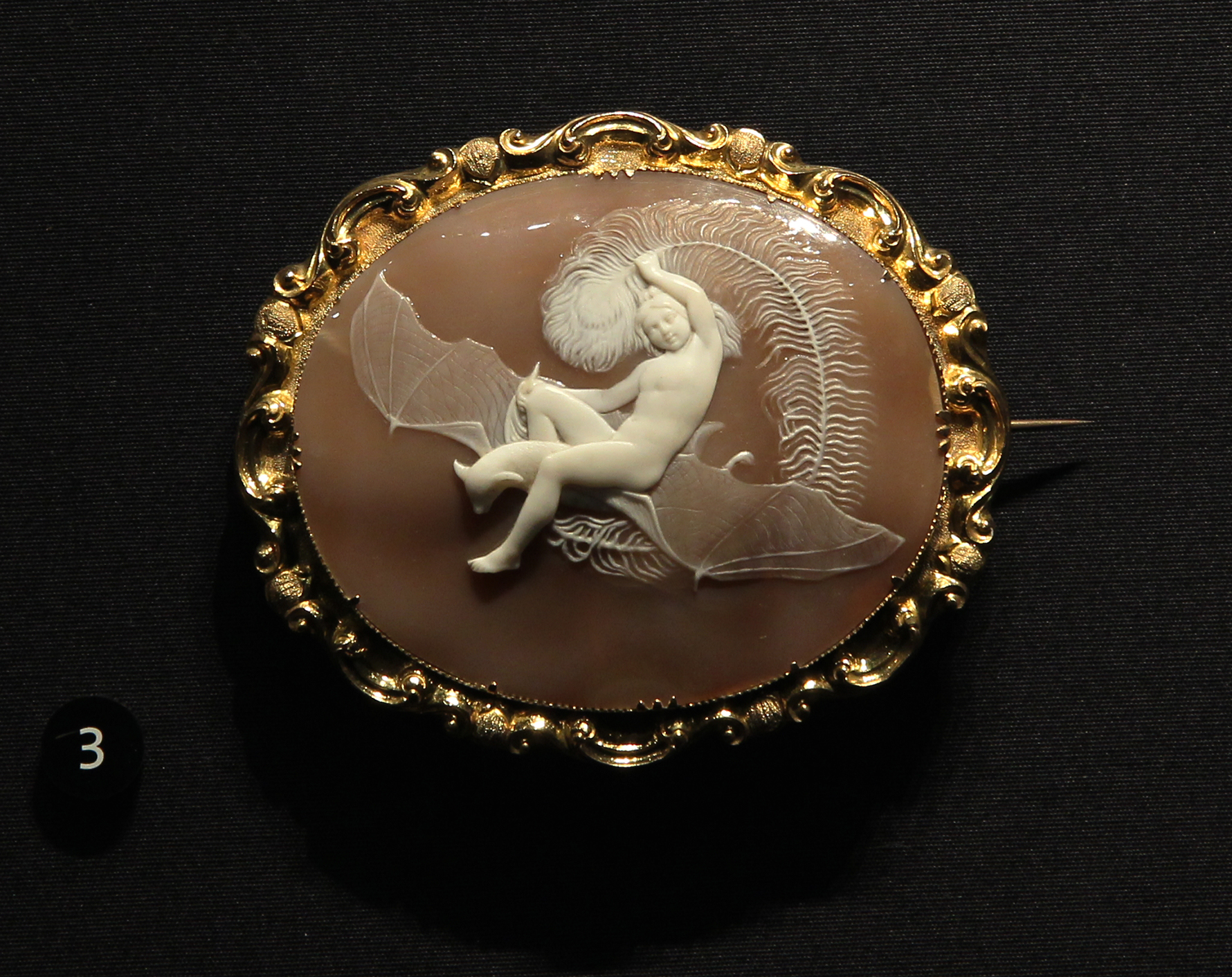
A cameo used throughout the Romantic period

=== The Romantic period (1837-1861) ===
The first period in Victorian jewellery is known as the Romantic period or early Victorian period. During this period, inspiration derived from the Renaissance, Middle Ages and the natural world. This period saw a rise in the use of gold material, which contributed to the construction of jewellery.

Key features in this period consisted of:

- Themes: The natural world inspired motifs such as serpents and lotus flowers, snakes, serpents, trees and birds.
- Materials: Common materials used were gold, seed pearls, ivory, tortoiseshell, coral, onyx, agate, diamonds, amber, amethyst, emerald and quartz.
- Common jewellery worn: Rings and brooches, bracelets and cameos.

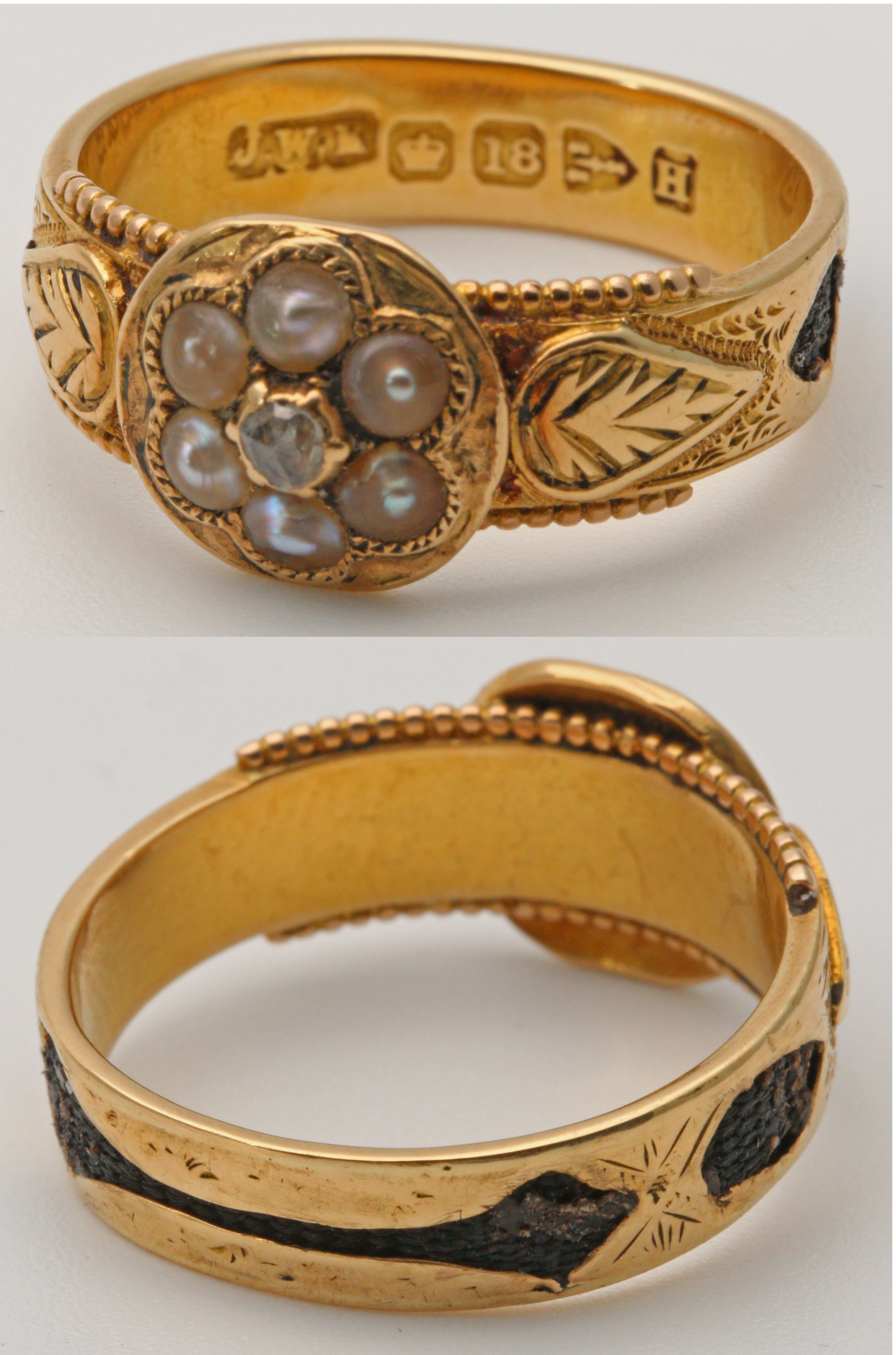
Gold mourning ring used during the Grand period

=== The Grand period (1861- 1885) ===
The second period in Victorian jewellery is known as the Grand period or the mid-Victorian period. This period saw a sharp change in design from delicate to bold which paralleled the changing social roles and representation of women at the time. During this period, imitations of jewellery were prominent and costume jewellery originated. This period witnessed the emergence of women in business and politics and saw women demanding to study at university, the right to vote and to earn their own money.

Key features in this period consisted of:

- Themes: Insects such as flies, butterflies, dragonflies and beetles.
- Materials: Gold was used to create a 'soft' look, colourless stones, silver, jet, ivory and pearls.
- Common jewellery worn: Earrings, brooches, bracelets, necklaces for outings during the night and lockets as casual daywear.

The death of Queen Victoria's husband, Prince Albert in 1861, also inspired the use of mourning jewellery in this period- (see Victorian jewellery § Mourning jewellery).

=== The Aesthetic period (1885-1901) ===
The third period in Victorian jewellery is known as the Aesthetic period or the late Victorian period. During this period, there was a distinct change in how women wore jewellery. This period encouraged the agency of women in society, with women's rise to power with the creation of their own political organisations. This change encouraged freedom of thought and less of a desire to be seen as feminine. Due to this, significantly less jewellery was purchased with women only choosing to wear jewellery on special occasions, and little jewellery being worn casually throughout the day.

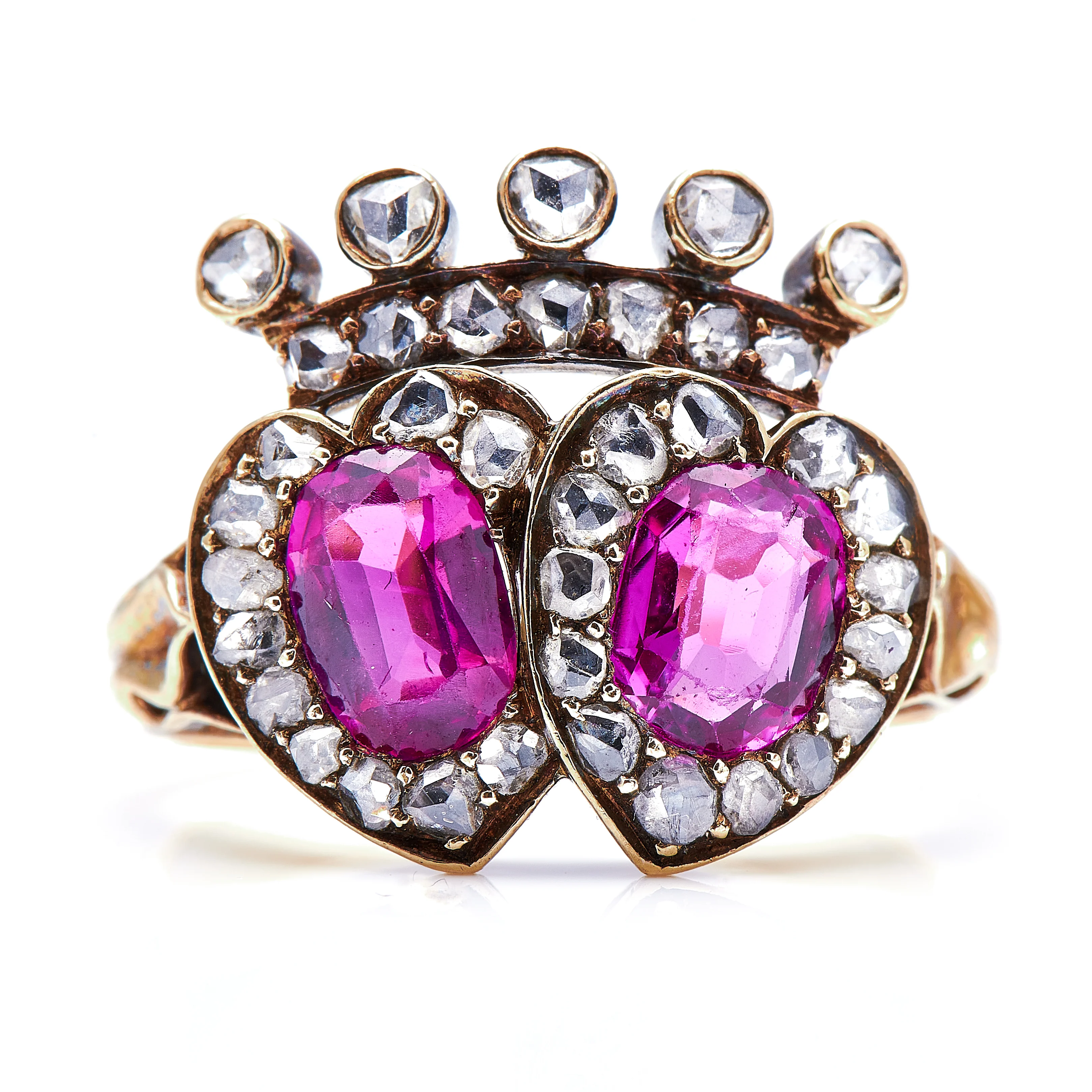
A typical Victorian engagement ring from the Aesthetic period

Key features in this period consisted of:

- Themes: the return of the romantic style such as soft and natural colours, butterflies and roses.
- Materials: amethysts, emeralds and opals.
- Common jewellery worn: small and simple brooches, earrings, the use of bracelets almost disappeared.

During this era, Queen Victoria also continued to inspire the wearing of mourning jewellery.

== Hair jewellery ==
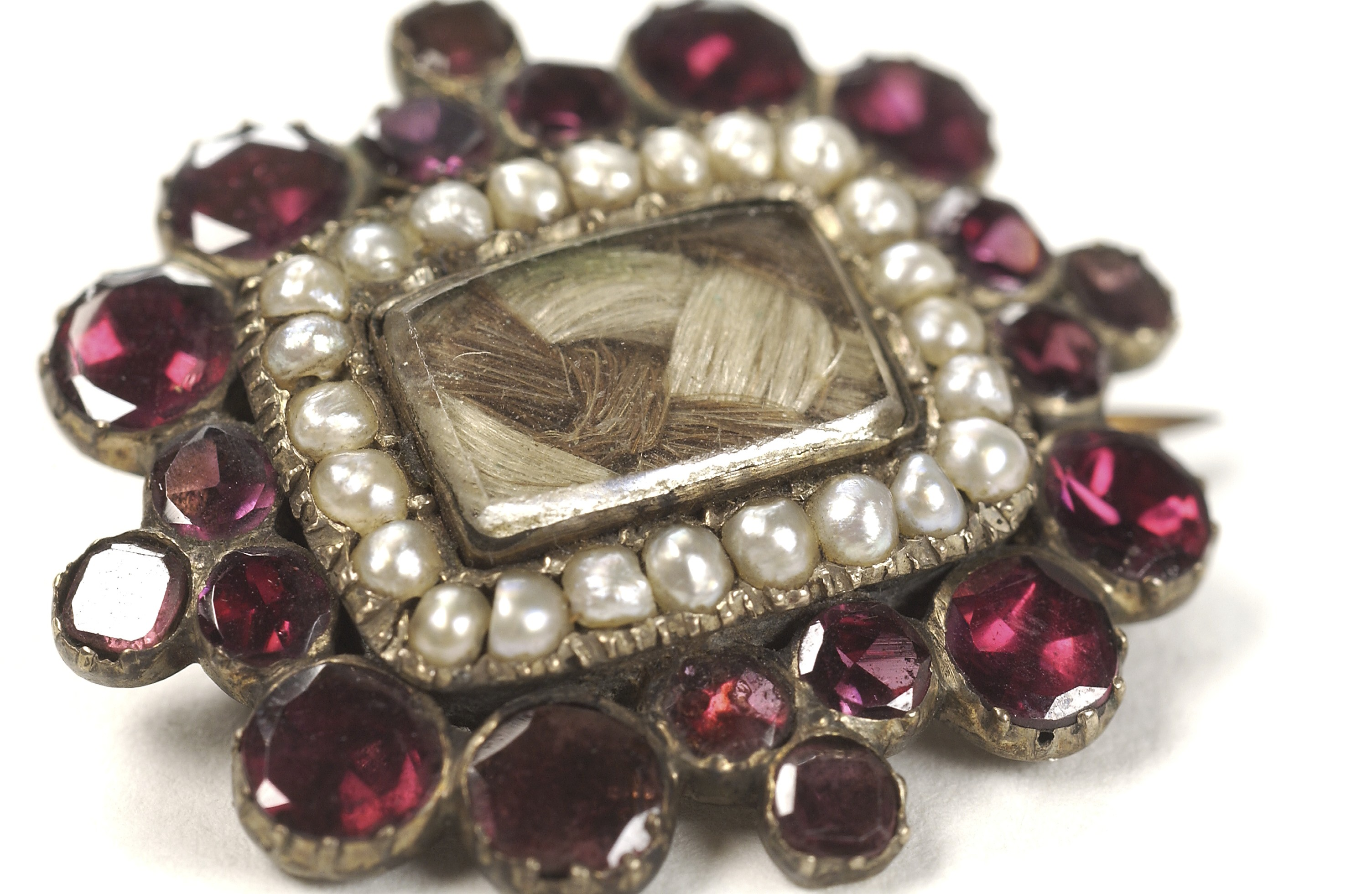
A mourning brooch containing hair

Hair jewellery (or hairwork) became an established fashion during the mid eighteenth century. Hair jewellery became increasingly prominent in the 1850s with this trend lasting until the 1880s. Although hair jewellery existed before 1861, its use by Queen Victoria after the death of her husband, Prince Albert, reignited and heightened the popularity of hairwork.

The practice of using hair as mourning jewellery forms part of the Victorian relic culture. The idea of incorporating hair strands into jewellery is a method of materialising the mourning process. Hair is incorporated into jewellery as a memento, considering it is the only part of the body that does not change or decay after death. The use of hair jewellery stems from the material need to create an emotional connection with the departed, even beyond the grave. Hair was considered a versatile material that was incorporated into a variety of jewellery. Hair was commonly interwoven into bracelets, earrings, brooches, rings and watch chains. Materials such as pearls, gold, gems and enamels were commonly added to hair jewellery as decoration. A common use for hair jewellery was to acknowledge and remember the departed and the second use of hair jewellery was to commemorate the departed throughout funeral ceremonies. Funerals permitted women to wear specific hair ornaments. Hair ornaments incorporated motifs of skeletons, coffins, angels and crossbones. The use of braided hair was also incorporated in the floral arrangements used at funerals.

Other than their use as a romantic keepsake and their use at funerals, hair jewellery represented a material object and popular fashion accessory. Hair jewellery was not worn and accessible for all, its use was limited to middle and upper class women. Hair jewellery was seen as a use of tangible objects that could signify a woman's femininity and status within society. The creation of hair jewellery by a woman expressed her femininity and became a common craft. A woman's ability to produce handicrafts such as hair jewellery demonstrated she was an ideal homemaker. Women that successfully produced hair jewellery demonstrated their domestic skills and womanhood within society. The craft of creating jewellery using woven hair was a skill that was transferred between a mother and her daughter. The large demand for making hair jewellery called for a woman's desire to be industrious from the comfort of her own home. Hair jewellery was often produced within the home environment using tools such as a curling iron, tweezers, gum, a porcelain pallet and a knife. An increase in women individually creating their own hair jewellery stemmed from a lack of trust for jewellers. The act of sending hair fragments of a beloved person to a jeweller was considered a dangerous act given that there was no assurance that the hair incorporated in the jewellery belonged to their beloved. Due to this, women began the craft of creating their own hair jewellery.

Apart from its main use as mourning jewellery, hair jewellery also had a secondary use. This use accounts for the exchanging of sentimental jewellery by using hair from living persons to represent friendship.

Hair jewellery associated with Queen Victoria is very collectible - recent pieces going for tens of thousands of pounds at auction.

== Mourning jewellery ==
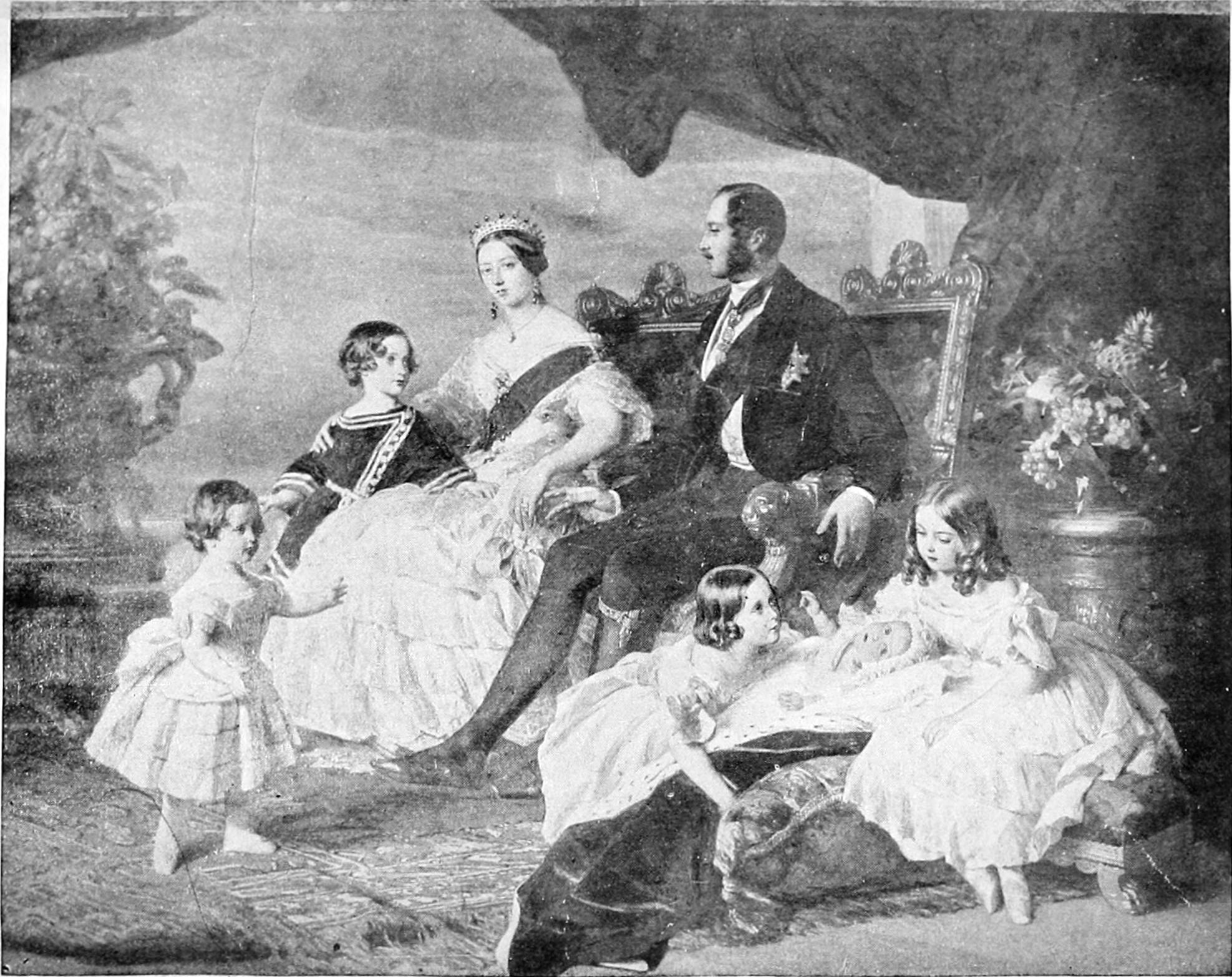
Queen Victoria, Prince Albert and the royal family

The process of mourning was long-lasting and was performed by both men and women. During the process of grieving, mourning jewellery was predominantly worn by women. The idea of women wearing jewellery during their mourning period pertains to the idea of womanhood and how women must keep their status alive to represent their husband, even whilst in deep mourning. Following the death of Queen Victoria's husband Prince Albert, she entered a mourning period. This mourning period spanned more than 40 years until her death. Many grievers participated during the mourning of Prince Albert. Queen Victoria enforced a mourning period upon the court. Throughout this mourning period jet jewels were the only acceptable jewellery that could be worn. The practice of wearing black mourning jewellery continued even after the mourning period of Prince Albert given the high infant mortality rate existing in England at the time.

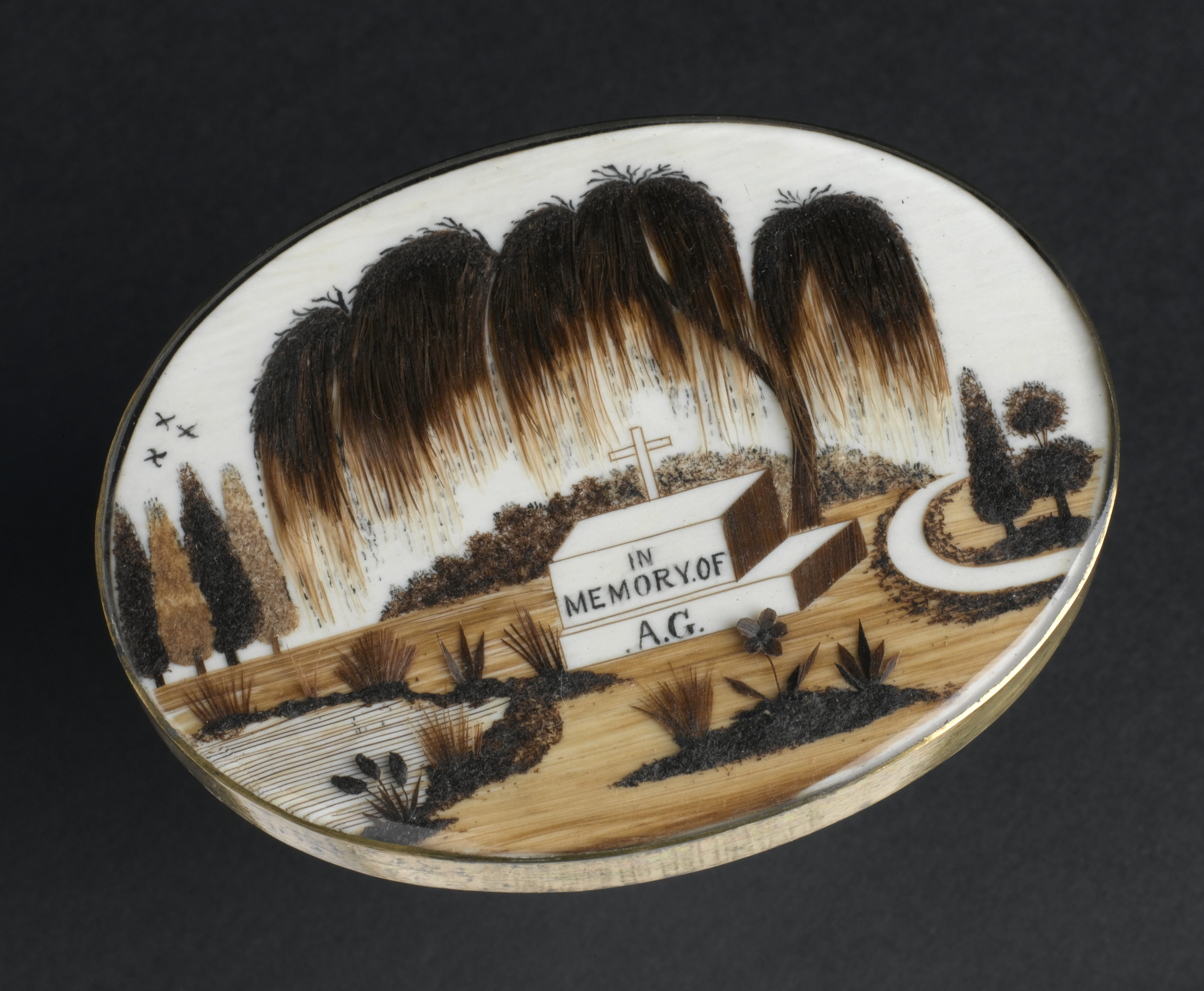
Victorian mourning brooch

After the death of a beloved, a ritual of mourning applied for grievers. The ritual commenced from the day of the person's death until at least one year after the death of the person. During this time grievers were not permitted to wear shiny or reflective materials and must be entirely dressed in black, this was inclusive of both clothes and jewellery. In contrast, the second year of mourning permitted grievers to wear more subdued colours such as white or colourless materials, pearls and diamonds.

Wearing mourning jewellery displayed the strong connection between a beloved and the deceased person. For this reason, the Victorian mourning period saw the development of personalised jewellery that were used as mementos. Mourning jewellery often displayed initials or the names of the deceased and their date of death which were engraved into the jewellery in remembrance of the departed. A mourning ring for the author Charlotte Brontë, for instance, was rediscovered in 2019 - it was inscribed with her name and death date (March 1855), and held a braid of her hair behind a locked panel.

The symbol of eyes had a powerful significance in mourning jewellery. A single eye was often included in jewellery such as brooches. An eye signified a spiritual presence of the departed with the person who wore the jewellery, in this way the departed could watch over the person who was wearing the jewellery. Another element often incorporated into jewellery were pearls, which represented tear drops. The fashion of mourning jewellery gradually declined in 1901 following the death of Queen Victoria.

Throughout the mourning period, there were two main materials that became frequently sourced in jewellery. In order to keep up with the demand for these materials sourced in mourning jewellery, imitations of these materials were discovered. Some of these imitations include hardened rubber also known as "french jet", black enamel and black glass. The two main materials used to create mourning jewellery consisted of jet and black onyx jewels.

=== Jet jewels ===
Throughout the mid nineteenth century, jet was a material that was much sought after due to its use in mourning jewellery. Due to large demand for the material, a large jet industry was established in Whitby. Being fossilised, jet was valued because it was lightweight, intense black in colour, durable, inexpensive and could be easily carved. Jet was used to design mourning jewellery such as bracelets, necklaces, brooches, cameos and pendants. After the death of Prince Albert, Queen Victoria's love of jewellery was less evident. The Queen mostly wore jet, hair jewellery containing the prince's hair and her wedding ring.

=== Black onyx jewels ===
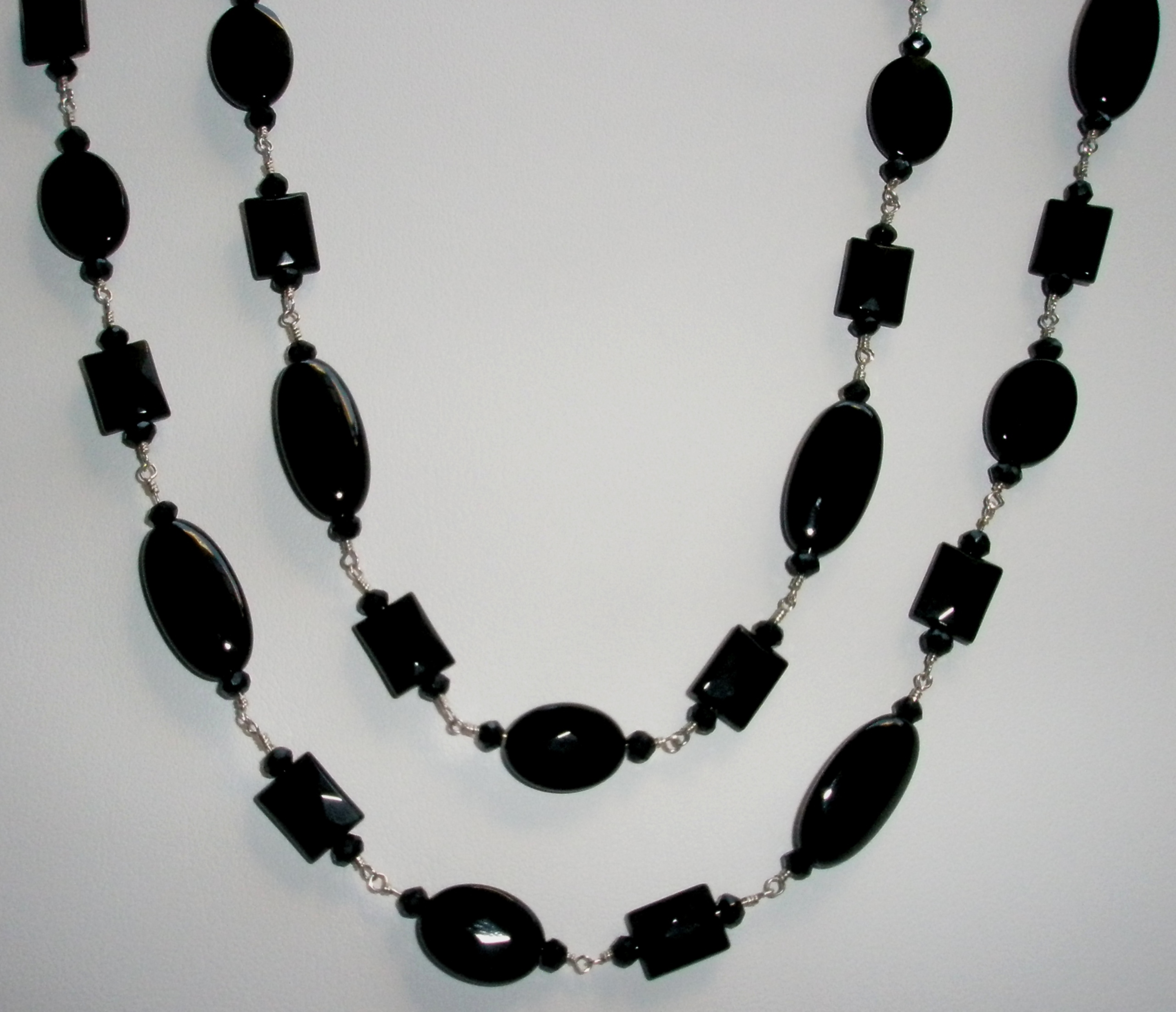
Black onyx necklace

Black onyx was also commonly used to make mourning jewellery. Black onyx, otherwise known as black-dyed chalcedony, was a material mostly used in constructing cameos and was used in beadwork.
