= Tie pin =

Item for securing neckwear

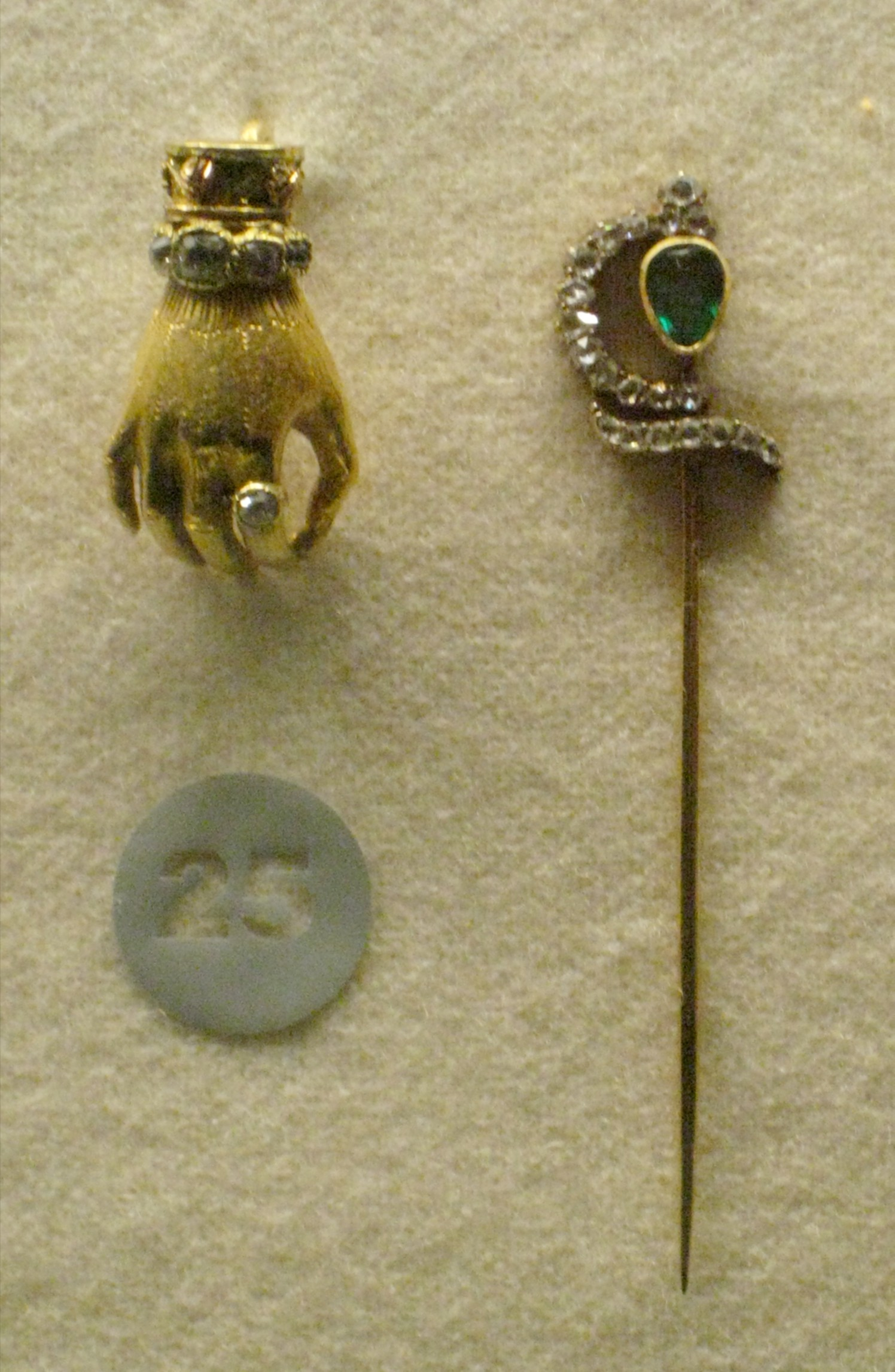
Golden tiepin with emerald, 19th century

A tie pin (or tiepin, also known as a stick pin/stickpin) is a neckwear-controlling device, originally worn by wealthy English gentlemen to secure the folds of their cravats.

== History ==
Tie pins were first popularized at the beginning of the 19th century. Cravats were made of silk, satin, lace and lightly starched cambric, lawn cloth, and muslin. Stickpins were necessary accoutrements to keep these expensive fabrics in place and safe. They commonly used pearls and other precious gemstones set in gold or other precious metals and were designed specifically for their owners.

By the 1860s, the English upper middle classes embraced wearing cravats with a consequently lower quality of materials and designs used in both the neckwear and in the stickpins used to keep it in place. By the 1870s, Americans had embraced stickpins and designs were mass-produced which included animal heads, horse shoes, knife and fork motifs, crossed pipes, wishbones, bugs, flowers, shields and a host of other figural motifs. By the 1890s, stickpins had crossed gender lines as women began wearing them with sporting outfits worn for bicycling, boating, horseback riding, tennis, and golf. The ascot, four-in-hand, sailor scarf, cravat bow tie, and wrapped scarf all became popular for both men and women, and all could be set off with an ornamental stickpin.

The temperance campaigner, Carrie Nation partly financed her "hatchetations" from sales of stick pins in the shape of hatchets. The souvenirs were provided by a Topeka, Kansas, pharmacist. Engraved on the handle of the hatchet, the pin reads, "Death to Rum".

Gold or silver style safety pins were commonly used as tie and collar pins from the beginning of the 20th century. Such a safety pin was used to fasten the tie to the shirt and was an integral part of a man's clothing or school uniform, being especially useful on formal occasions or in windy weather. Alternative ways to control unruly ties are available, although an ordinary safety pin inserted through from behind the shirt can invisibly secure the tie without damaging its surface.

During the 1920s the use of straight ties made of delicate materials such as silk became more fashionable and the use of tie clips gained prominence, replacing the more traditional tie pin.

== Patents ==
Between 1894 and 1930 many patents were issued covering such issues as prong setting, ornament attachment, stickpin blanks, safety clutches, guards and decorations. One patent was for a brooch which could convert the center medallion to a stickpin. Another concealed a small lead pencil point attached to the shaft of the pin. Still another included a small water reservoir behind the ornamental head of the stick pin in which a flower blossom could be placed. Patent 1,301,568 dated April 22, 1919 was for a luminous stickpin with a star motif disk-like head which held a small drop of radioactive material.
