= Charles Warren (MP) =

English barrister, politician, judge and amateur cricketer

Charles Warren (19 March 1764 – 12 August 1829) was an English barrister and politician, judge and amateur cricketer.

== Life ==
A son of Richard Warren, and nephew of John Warren, he was brother to John Warren the Dean of Bangor, physician Pelham Warren, and Frederick Warren; and uncle to John's children Sir Charles Warren, and mathematician John Warren. He was educated at Westminster School and Jesus College, Cambridge, which he entered in 1780, matriculating in 1784, graduating B.A. in 1785, and finishing M.A. in 1788. He was a Fellow of Jesus College from 1786 to 1813. Entering Lincoln's Inn in 1781, he was called to the bar in 1790. He was elected a Fellow of the Royal Society in 1790.

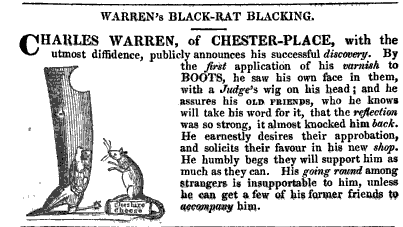
Warren's Black-Rat Blacking, advertising parody for Warren's Blacking, prompted by Charles Warren's defection from the Whigs to the Tories for a position as a judge

In 1792, Warren signed a declaration by the Society of the Friends of the People. He was called as a defence witness in the 1798 trial of Sackville Tufton, 9th Earl of Thanet.

== Legal career ==
An Old Bailey barrister, Warren also took up a bankruptcy commission. He was chancellor to the diocese of Bangor from 1797, for the rest of his life.

Warren was made King's Counsel in 1816. He was appointed Chief Justice of Chester in 1819, and was the last to hold the post: between his death in 1829, and the abolition of the position by the Law Terms Act 1830, the functions were carried out by Thomas Jervis his junior, as Puisne Justice of Chester. In April 1820 he presided over the sedition trial of Sir Charles Wolseley, 7th Baronet and Joseph Harrison, sitting with Samuel Marshall.

== Political career ==
In parallel with his position as a judge of the Welsh judicature, Warren was a Member of Parliament, for Dorchester. An English judge could not sit in the House of Commons; but the situation for a Welsh judge was otherwise. This and other differences in the judicatures were under debate in parliament from the time he took up his post as Chief Justice of Chester, Warren defending the status quo.

The political patron at Dorchester who brought Warren in as a candidate in 1819 was Cropley Ashley-Cooper, 6th Earl of Shaftesbury, known as a supporter of the Tory administration of Lord Liverpool. Warren was not opposed in the general election of 1820 caused by the death of George III. His reputation, as "ageing and discredited", had slumped, and there was some expectation that he would retire in 1824, when John Leslie Foster was waiting in the wings. He left it to the general election of 1826, however.

== Legacy ==
Papers concerning the Chester Circuit went in 1847, after Warren's death, to the Public Record Office. Peter Stafford Carey and David Williams transferred the papers after Amelia Warren had also died.

== Family ==
Warren married Amelia, daughter of William Charles Sloper, and Amelia, née Shipley, of Sundridge, Kent on 9 July 1813, at the house of Lady Jones in South Audley Street, London.

== Cricket ==
As a keen amateur cricketer, Warren was mainly associated with Middlesex. He played for the Gentlemen in the inaugural Gentlemen v Players match in 1806, and made 33 known appearances in important matches from 1795 to 1826.

Along with John Tanner, Warren was the last 18th century player to retire from cricket, in his case at the age of 62.

Parliament of the United Kingdom
Preceded by Sir Samuel Shepherd	Member of Parliament for Dorchester; 1819–1826	Succeeded by William Ashley-Cooper
