= Leila's Hair Museum =

Museum in Independence, Missouri, US

Coordinates: 39°04′34″N 94°24′48″W

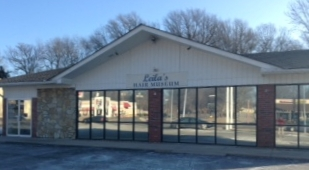
Leila's Hair Museum

Leila's Hair Museum was a museum in Independence, Missouri that displays examples of hairwork dating back to the 18th century. It closed in September 2025.

== Hair art ==
Hairwork is a form of art that began in the 16th century or earlier, and flourished in the Victorian era. A collection of hair from family, friends, or a gathering such as a wedding, was made into a hair wreath by making flowers of the hair. It was then put into a shadow box frame. Wreaths were also made as memorial pieces using hair from the deceased. Hairwork was used by people wanting to keep a memento of a loved one before the invention of photography. Hairwork also consisted of necklaces, bracelets, rings, lockets, paintings and medallions embellished with strands of hair.

== Museum history ==
Leila Cohoon (1931-2024) was a retired cosmetology teacher living in Independence, Missouri, who started collecting hair in 1956 and considered it to be her life work. She had a lifelong fascination with hair, and considered it one of the most interesting parts of the human body. In 1990, having begun to run out of space in her home for her hairwork collection, Cohoon opened her hair museum in a small front room in the Independence School of Cosmetology (which she founded in 1960). Later, she moved her hair museum a few blocks from the old location so as to be able to expand. The new location for the museum consists of multiple rooms with walls covered from top to bottom with hairworks. The museum closed down during the COVID-19 pandemic, and reopened in autumn 2023 with the caveat that visitors must schedule an appointment via email. Struggling after its reopening and Cohoon’s death, the museum closed permanently in September 2025. Lindsay Evans, Cohoon's granddaughter, is working to place the collection in other museums across the U.S.

== The collection ==
Leila’s Hair Museum has more than 700 wreaths and over 2,000 pieces of jewelry, many of which date back to before the year 1900. Among her artifacts are a framed assemblage of hair from every member of a chapter of the League of Women Voters, and two frames with hair shorn from sisters who both entered a convent. Her oldest exhibit is a brooch dated 1680.

Collecting the hair of famous people is secondary to Cohoon's goal of preserving hair art; that being said, there are also exhibits that include the hair of famous people. Hair from Michael Jackson is in the museum, which garnered the museum a mention in a Jeopardy! question on December 30, 2016. The museum also has hair from Elvis Presley, George Washington, Abraham Lincoln, Daniel Webster, Aaron Burr, Marilyn Monroe, singer Jenny Lind, and abolitionist John Brown.
