= Lock of hair =

Tress, curl, or ringlet of hair

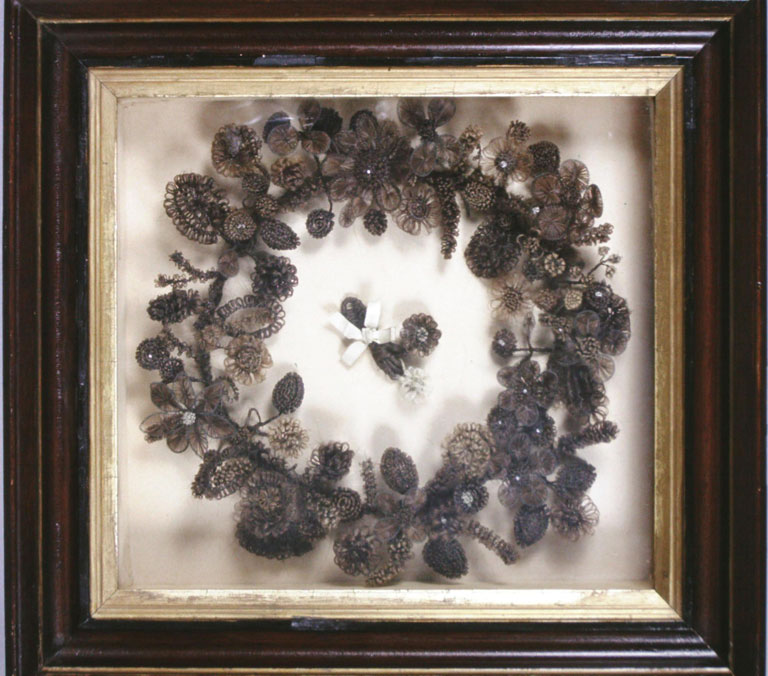
A hair wreath from the 19th century with a lock of hair in the center, in the collection of The Children's Museum of Indianapolis

A lock of hair is a piece or pieces of human hair that are usually bunched or tied together in some way. A lock of hair can be on a person's head, or have been cut from the head. When attached to the head, a lock of hair generally refers to a tress, curl, or ringlet of hair. When cut from the head, a lock of hair may be kept for its symbolic value.

== Symbolic value ==
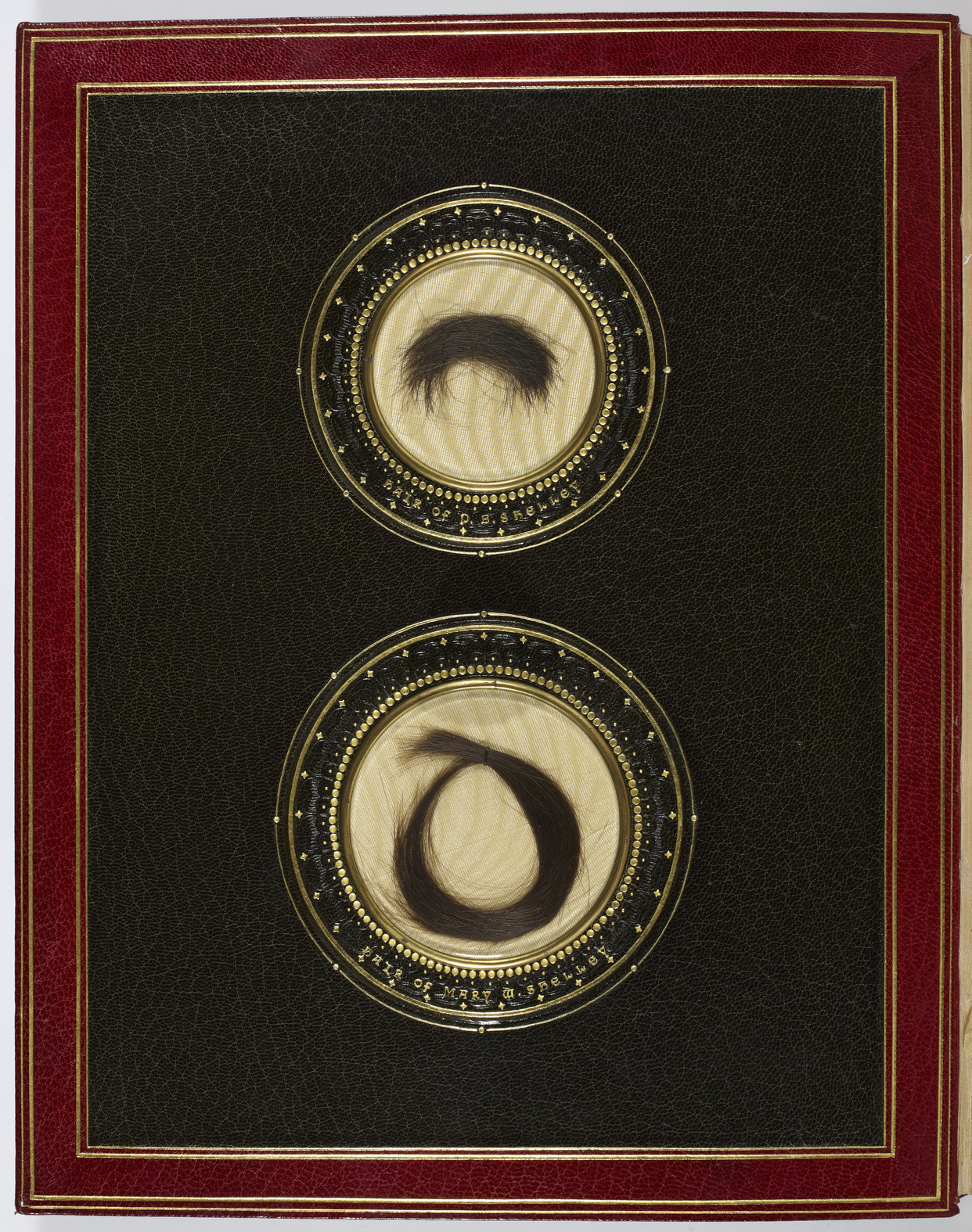
Preserved locks of the hair of Percy and Mary Shelley now in the British Library.

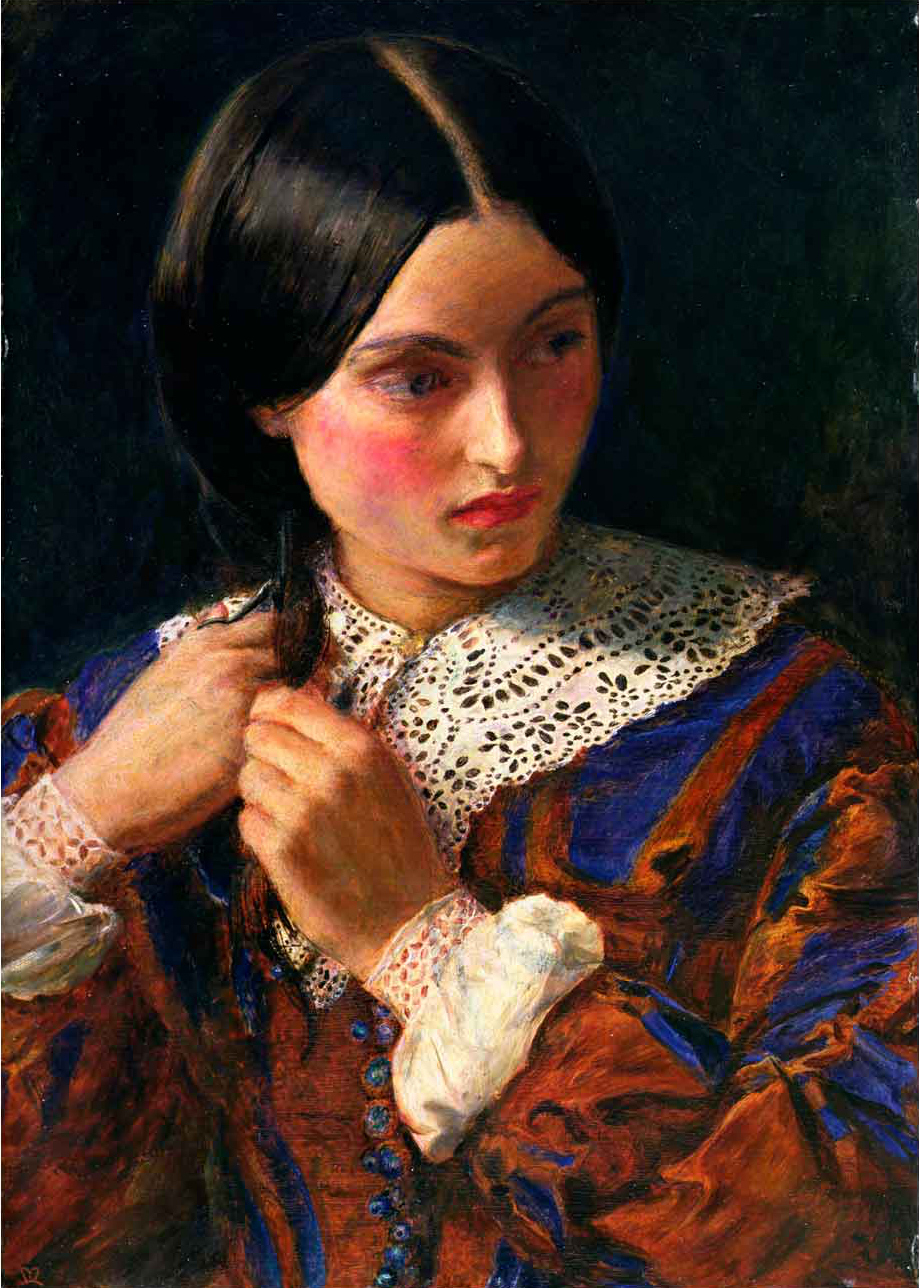
Only a Lock of Hair by John Everett Millais, 1857–58, showing a young woman cutting off a lock of her hair.

Locks of hair often carry symbolic value and have been utilized throughout history in various religious, superstitious, sentimental and romantic contexts. Examples include:

- A traditional belief maintains that owning a lock of hair from an individual's head gives a person magical power over that individual.
- Historically, giving a lock of one's hair to someone has been considered a sign of love and devotion, especially before an impending parting. It is still a popular trope in fiction, particularly the romance genre. Such locks are intended to be kept by the recipient as a memento.
- During antiquity, Roman girls who were about to be married offered locks of hair to Jove (Jupiter) in his forest god aspect, Virbius (Virbio).
- A common superstition holds that a lock of hair from a baby's first haircut should be kept for good luck.
- An old Irish superstition holds that it is unlucky to accept a lock of hair (or a four-footed beast) from a lover.
- In Victorian times it was common for bereaved family members to keep locks of hair from deceased children or family members. These locks of hair were seen as mementos and served to comfort the surviving loved ones. These locks of hair were typically kept in lockets. Small jars, and other kinds of jewellery including bracelets, earrings, and brooches (see hair jewelry) were also used.

== Use in hairstyles ==
The following hairstyles make use of lock(s) for symbolic or aesthetic reasons.

- Childhood lock:

An ancient and worldwide (e.g. China, Egypt, Thailand, Albania, Ukraine, India, Israel, etc.) pre-adolescent custom was to shave children's heads, leaving one lock (or sometimes several isolated locks) untouched. Upon reaching adulthood, the lock of hair was usually cut off (see Rites of passage).

- Scalp lock or crown tuft:

A scalp lock or crown tuft is a single long lock of hair on an otherwise shaven head. Like childhood locks, the scalp lock was a worldwide phenomenon, particularly noted amongst eastern woodland Native American tribes (see Iroquois, Huron, Mahican, Mohawk) in North America (see also Scalping and Mohawk hairstyle), Eastern Europe, and the Ottoman Empire.
According to Leo the Deacon, a Byzantine historian, Sviatoslav I of Kiev was reported to have worn a scalp lock. Later Ukrainian Cossacks (Zaporozhians) sported scalplocks called oseledets or khokhol.

Yörük man with perçem scalp lock

Scalp locks or crown tufts on shaven heads (Turkish: perçem 'tuft, lock' Ottoman Turkish: پرچمی; modern writers also use ecem perçemi 'death lock, death tuft') were common for men into the early 20th century in the Ottoman Empire, Greece, and the Balkans, worn under turbans or later fezzes. One legend explains this as allowing an enemy to carry a severed head without sticking fingers into his mouth. Another says that the tuft allows an angel to pull the believer into heaven. Other locks of hair worn by Ottomans included the kâkül كاكل (forehead fringe) and zülf زلڧ (sidelock).
The Imazighen (Berber) men of Morocco had the custom of shaving the head but leaving a single lock of hair on either the crown, left, or right side of the head, so that the angel Azrael is able "...to pull them up to heaven of the Last Day." This hairstyle is observed by Mark Twain in his travel book The Innocents Abroad, in which he describes Moroccan men as sporting scalplocks.
In India this custom remains active in the form of the shikha, but is usually only worn by orthodox Hindus.

- Polish plait:

A Polish plait (Koltun in Polish, meaning "Knot", but often referred to in English as an "Elf-Lock") is a lock of matted hair similar to a dreadlock. Due to a scalp disease (Plica polonica), King Christian IV of Denmark (1577–1648) had a Polish plait hanging from the left side of his head, which in an engraved portrait in the Royal Collection is adorned by a large pearl. His courtiers were said to have adopted the hairstyle in order to flatter the king. Due to superstitious beliefs, the Polish plait used to be particularly common in Poland (hence its name). Initially, the plait was treated as an amulet, supposed to bring good health, as the plait was supposed to take the illness "out" of the body, and therefore it was rarely cut off.

- Lovelock:

The lovelock was a popular hairstyle amongst European "men of fashion" from the end of the 16th century until well into the 17th century. The lovelock was a long lock of generally plaited (braided) hair made to rest over the left shoulder (the heart side) to show devotion to a loved one.

== Notable Examples ==
The following locks of hair are notable for their cultural or historical significance:

- A lock of Beethoven's hair, cut from his head in 1827, was auctioned in 1994 through Sotheby's of London. Research on the hair determined that the composer's lifelong illness was caused by lead poisoning.

== See also ==
- Dreadlocks, commonly called locs or dreads
- Hairwork, artwork made of human hair
- Goldilocks, a nursery rhyme character so named due to her golden hair
- Payot, sidelocks, or earlocks worn by male Orthodox Jews
- Ringlet (haircut)

== Sources ==
- The Golden Bough by James Frazer - Penguin Books, ISBN 978-0-14-018931-5
- The Innocents Abroad by Mark Twain - Signet Classic, ISBN 1-85532-848-8
- 2000 by David Nicolle - Osprey Publishing, ISBN 0-451-52502-7
- Daily Life in Ancient India From 200 BC to 700 AD by Jeannine Auboyer - Phoenix Press, ISBN 1-84212-591-5
- The Cossacks by John Ure - The Overlook Press, ISBN 1-58567-138-X
- (in English) Ancient Egyptian Hairstyles
- (in English) Ukrainian Cossack Display Group
- (in English) Common Superstitions
- (in English) Ancient Legends, Mystic Charms, and Superstitions of Ireland
