= Geneviève Thiroux d'Arconville =

French writer and chemist (1720–1805)

Marie-Geneviève-Charlotte Thiroux d'Arconville
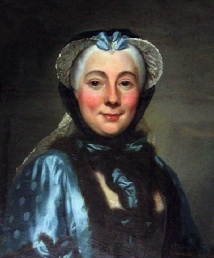
- Painting of scientist and historian Mme d'Arconville, 1750
- Born: 17 October 1720; Paris
- Died: 23 December 1805 (aged 85); Paris
- Known for: Chemical study of putrefaction
- Spouse: Louis Lazare Thiroux d'Arconville (m. 1735; died 1789)
- Scientific career
- Fields: Chemistry

Marie Geneviève Charlotte Thiroux d'Arconville (née Darlus, also known as la présidente Thiroux d’Arconville and Geneviève Thiroux d'Arconville) (17 October 1720 – 23 December 1805), was a French novelist, translator and chemist who is known for her study on putrefaction. She discussed her study on putrefaction in her Essay on the History of Putrefaction in 1766.

== Early life ==
Marie-Geneviève-Charlotte Thiroux d'Arconville was born Marie-Geneviève-Charlotte Darlus to Françoise Gaudicher and Guillaume Darlus on 17 October 1720. Her father was a tax farmer or farmer-general; they collected taxes for the state and usually kept some for themselves. Thiroux d'Arconville's mother died when she was four and her education was left in the hands of multiple governesses. As a young child, she enjoyed sculpture and art however when she learned to write at age eight, writing books became a new interest. She told friends later in life that she hardly had an idea without a pen in her hand.

== Marriage and early adult life ==
At fourteen years old, Thiroux d'Arconville requested to be married to Louis Lazare Thiroux d'Arconville, a tax farmer who later became a president in the Parliament of Paris, a regional justice court. She is an anomaly in that most women during this time period didn't request to be married. The two were married on 28 February 1735. Together the couple had three sons. As a married woman, Thiroux d'Arconville enjoyed theater and opera, similar to many wealthy women. She reportedly saw Voltaire's Mérope fifteen times in a row. However, when she was 22, Thiroux d'Arconville suffered from a case of smallpox that left her badly scarred. After this experience she withdrew from society and spent her time studying and focusing on religion.

Thiroux d'Arconville studied English and Italian at her home and attended science classes at Jardin des Plantes, the Kings's Garden in Paris and a center of medical education that was founded in 1626 by King Louis XIII. She also often gathered well-known scientists in her home. The Garden offered courses on physics, anatomy, botany and chemistry to both men and women. It is thought that Thiroux d'Arconville took both anatomy and chemistry classes. Similar to many aristocratic women of the time, Thiroux d'Arconville also collected rare plants and stones. While she enjoyed these activities, she wanted to learn more so she set up a laboratory in her home and stocked it with chemistry equipment. She also ordered books from Bibliothèque nationale de France, the national library of France. Initially Thiroux d'Arconville worked as a botanist, she sent specimens to Jardin des Plantes. Eventually she turned to chemistry and started working under the guidance of Pierre Macquer, a professor of chemistry and pharmacology at the Garden.

Women had long been a part of the literary community in France; critics thought this indicative of the advanced French society. Scholars viewed the idea of the "woman writer" as a sign of modernity and women in society were aware of the large body of work written by female scholars; in this sense, Thiroux d'Arconville was not an anomaly. However, because of her disfiguration, she chose to withdraw from the social space of the French salons, and establish herself in the research laboratory instead.

== Career as a translator ==
=== Early translations ===
Thiroux d'Arconville's desire for learning and her love for British culture inspired her to begin translating various English works, on a variety of subjects, to French. Translating works was not uncommon for women during this time period; it was a way for women to engage in scholarship. Thiroux d'Arconville often added commentary to the works she translated; however she did not put her name on these texts. As a woman scholar during this time, she faced restrictions and gender-based expectations. In her work Sur les femmes, she wrote about women "Do they show science or wit? If their works are bad, they are jeered at; if they are good, they are taken from them, and they are left only with ridicule for letting themselves be called authors".

It has been said that Thiroux d'Arconville suffered from insomnia and worked on multiple projects at a time to prevent herself from growing bored. The first text she published was Advice from a Father to his Daughter in 1756. Advice from a Father to his Daughter was a translation of a text on morality written by George Savile, 1st Marquess of Halifax. In the preface of the translation Thiroux d'Arconville discussed how unqualified governesses often raised daughters because mothers did not want to raise them.

In 1759, she translated Peter Shaw's Chemical Lectures, at the encouragement of Macquer. Thiroux d'Arconville did not hesitate to fix any errors in Shaw's work and added information on the history of practical chemistry to the beginning of Shaw's text. In discussing the history of chemistry, she started with alchemy, which she claimed was not a true science. According to her, true chemistry began with men like Johann Joachim Becher, Herman Boerhaave, Georg Ernst Stahl, Nicolas Lemery and Étienne François Geoffroy, men helped nature reveal to humanity. Thiroux d'Arconville drew from the Bible to discuss the history of chemistry in the preface; she took science related citations from the Bible and inserted science into biblical stories to defend her arguments. Thiroux d'Arconville's usage of the Bible in her discussion on the history of chemistry was common for scholars of this time period; science was seen as a way to better understand God's creations.

=== Work with Jean-Joseph Sue ===
Also in 1759, Thiroux d'Arconville translated Alexander Monro's Treatise on Osteology. In order to write her preface for Treatise on Osteology, Thiroux d'Arconville looked to Jean-Joseph Sue, a professor of anatomy in the royal schools of surgery and painting and a royal censor for books of surgery, for help. In the preface, recognizing the limits to her knowledge on the subject, she redirected readers to other text that provided more in depth information. She also reorganized Monro's text and added illustrations. Monro is said to have thought that illustrations were inaccurate and unnecessary. While Thiroux d'Arconville agreed that observation is better, she thought the illustration could help with learning.

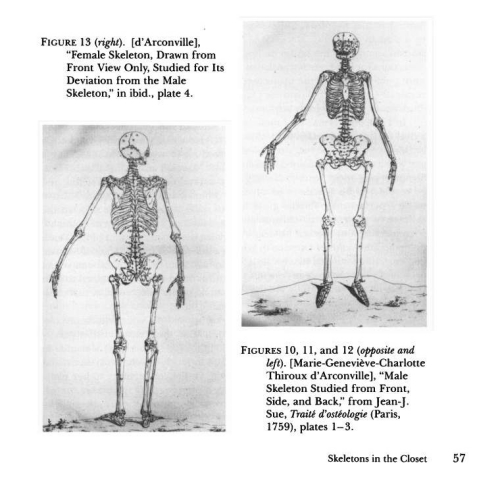
Picture of skeletons in Treatise on Osteology

It is thought that the images were created under the direction of Jean-Joseph Sue with added input by Thiroux d'Arconville while being financed by her. The skeletons seemed to have been modeled after her; they had a large, broad pelvis and narrow lower limbs, thought to have been caused by corsets Thiroux d'Arconville wore throughout her life. However part of the illustration was inaccurate; the proportion of the female skull to the body was smaller than the proportion of the male skull to the body, it should have been the other way around. Since, like her other works, she remained anonymous with this text, Sue was thought to be the lone author of the text.

=== Later translations ===
Thiroux d'Arconville's next publications were Moral Thoughts and Reflections on Diverse Subjects in 1760, On Friendship in 1761, and On Passions in 1764. These works showed her interest in morality and emphasized the value of being virtuous and chaste. This reflects the mindset of the eighteenth century because having these qualities was very important especially in women. In both On Passions and On Friendships she discusses how friendship is important because it allows for reasonable and levelheaded thinking. However excessive passion can be dangerous for society, especially love and ambition. These works were also published anonymously.

== Study of putrefaction ==
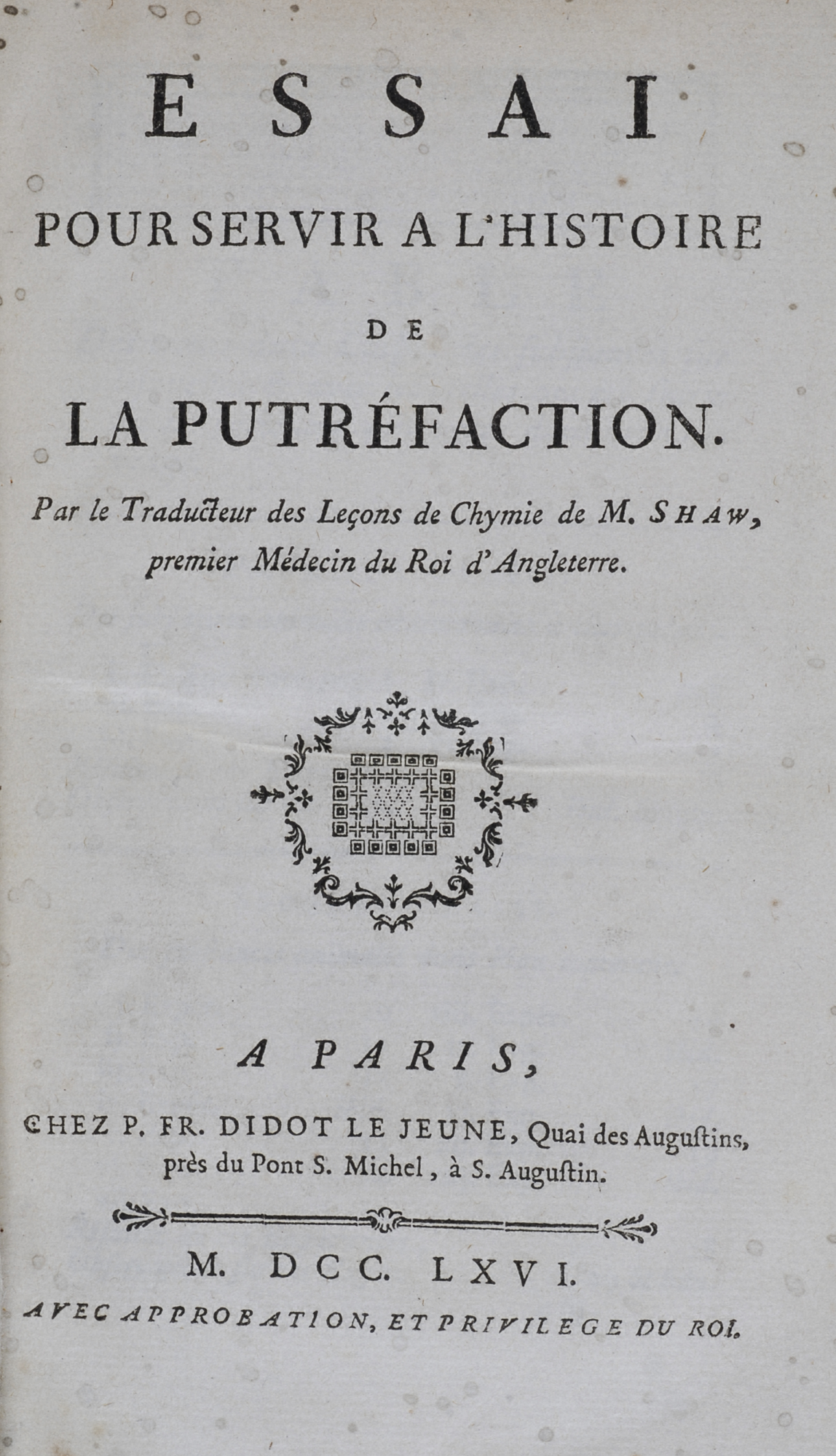
Essai pour servir a l'histoire de la putref́action, 1766

While working on these various texts, Thiroux d'Arconville also started studying putrefaction, or how plant and animal matter rot. She initially looked to the research of John Pringle, a military doctor who researched what makes wounds turn gangrenous. Thiroux d'Arconville thought that in order to understand putrefaction one needed to understand how matter is transformed. For ten years, she recorded the results of experiments involving rotting food under various conditions to see if putrefaction could be delayed. She found that protecting matter from air and exposing it to copper, camphor and cinchona could delay rotting. She published Essai pour servir a l'histoire de la putref́action (Essay on the History of Putrefaction) in 1766. The book included details of over 300 experiments, painstakingly carried out. She again remained anonymous, with one reviewer writing that the author of the essay "must be a highly distinguished physician with a deep knowledge of both chemistry and medicine". In her essay she paid homage to Pringle while also emphasizing the differences between their findings; she disagreed with Pringle in that he thought chamomile could delay rotting but she found that it did not. In the essay, Thiroux d'Arconville remarked that her work might have enhanced Pringle's text and that she was very careful when she conducted her experiments. She also discussed her reasons for going into the field of putrefaction, saying it was because the field was not well explored and society would benefit from learning more about it. Thiroux d'Arconville's reasons for studying putrefaction were reflective of the ideologies of the eighteenth century. During this time, the benefits that society could gain from more knowledge about a certain subject were heavily emphasized. Women were responsible for gaining knowledge in order to pass that knowledge down and better educate the next generation. So Thiroux d'Arconville's desire to study putrefaction to better society would have been accepted during this time.

== Later life ==
The year after publishing her study on putrefaction, Thiroux d'Arconville and her family moved from their Paris residence to an apartment in the Marais District. For a period of this time Thiroux d'Arconville stopped writing due to the death of her husband's older brother and her brother-in-law. She continued to befriend and communicate with male scholars.

Between 1767 and 1783, she changed the focus of her writing and started producing more novels and historical biographies. One of the novels she wrote was Memoirs of Mademoiselle Valcourt in 1767. This story is about two women, each thought to represent the different aspects of Thiroux d'Arconville's life; the younger sister is a girl who spends all her time in society and the older sister contracts smallpox and renounces love.

She also wrote many historical texts using Bibliothèque du roi, the King's Library. They included: Life of the Cardinal d’Ossat in 1771, Life of Marie de Medeci, Princess of Tuscany, Queen of France and Navarre in 1774 and History of Françoise II, King of France and Scotland in 1783. Critics described these biographies as lacking in style, which makes sense in the context of the eighteenth century; female authors were considered inferior to male authors. However, in the preface for Life of the Cardinal d’Ossat, Thiroux d'Arconville wrote that she understood that the text was very detail heavy but it was important in order to properly understand the man's life.

Thiroux d'Arconville did not publish after 1783. However, she wrote memoirs that were never published, including a twelve-volume manuscript of miscellanea. These were eventually lost, then rediscovered towards the end of the 20th century. In one such memoir, written in 1801, Thiroux d'Arconville tried to make sense of her experiences through a collection of "thoughts, reflections, and anecdotes".

Since Thiroux d'Arconville disapproved of the philosophers of the Enlightenment, she was terrified of the rise of the French Revolution. In 1789 her husband died and she was placed on house arrest then imprisoned with her family. That same year, her oldest son Thiroux de Crosne, lieutenant general of police, went into exile in England but returned in 1793 where he was arrested and killed the following year along with his uncle Angran d’Alleray. Six months after her son died, Thiroux d'Arconville was allowed to return to her home along with her sister, sister-in-law and grandson. By this time her investments were gone and her younger sons needed money. On 23 December 1805 Marie-Geneviève-Charlotte Thiroux d'Arconville died at her residence in Marais.

== Legacy ==
Thiroux d'Arconville's life was common of many women of the time. She followed the rules of how a mother and wife should act in this time period and she embraced religion. She also shied way from social controversy, shown by her decision to maintain anonymity. Thiroux d'Arconville was also not thought to be a feminist; she thought women wasted their lives on material things and most of her close friends were men. Due to her decision to remain anonymous her name is still not well known. It is thought that her decision to remain anonymous was self-preservation; a way to keep her personal life as a mother and a wife distinct from her writings. According to scholars, Thiroux d'Arconville's body of work showcased her feelings on what it means to be a high status female author during the eighteenth century in France.

== Works ==
=== Essays ===
- De l’Amitié, 1761, in-8°. (On Friendship)
- Traité des passions, 1764, in-8°. (Treatise on the Passions)
- Essai pour servir à l'histoire de la putréfaction, 1766, in-8°. (Essay on putrefaction)
- Histoire de mon enfance.
- Méditations sur les tombeaux. (Meditations on tombs)
- Mélanges de littérature, de morale et de physique, 1775.
- Pensées et réflexions morales sur divers sujets, 1760, 2nd end 1766, in-12.
- Sur moi.
- Traité d’ostéologie, in-fol.

=== Translations ===
- Avis d’un Père à sa Fille, 1756, in-12. Translated from the English of George Savile, 1st Marquess of Halifax.
- Leçons de chimie, 1759, in-4. Translation of Peter Shaw's Chemical Lectures (London: Longman, 2nd edn, 1755).
- Romans traduits de l'anglois, 1761. Includes excerpts translated from George Lyttelton's Letters from a Persian in England and Aphra Behn's Agnes de Castro.
- Mémoires de Mademoiselle de Falcourt.
- Amynthon et Thérèse
- Mélanges de Poésies Anglaises, traduits en français, 1764, in-12.

== See also ==
- Timeline of women in science

== Relevant literature ==
- Hayes, Julie Candler, ed. 2018. Marie Geneviève Charlotte Thiroux d’Arconville: Selected Philosophical, Scientific, and Autobiographical Writings. Arizona Center for Medieval and Renaissance Studies.
