= George Lefevre =

George Lefevre may refer to:

- George Shaw Lefevre, 1st Baron Eversley, British politician
- Sir George William Lefevre, English physician and travel writer
- George Le Fevre, politician and surgeon in the colony of Victoria, Australia

== See also ==
- Georges Lefebvre, French historian
