= Pelham Warren (physician) =

English physician

Pelham Warren (1778–1835) was an English physician.

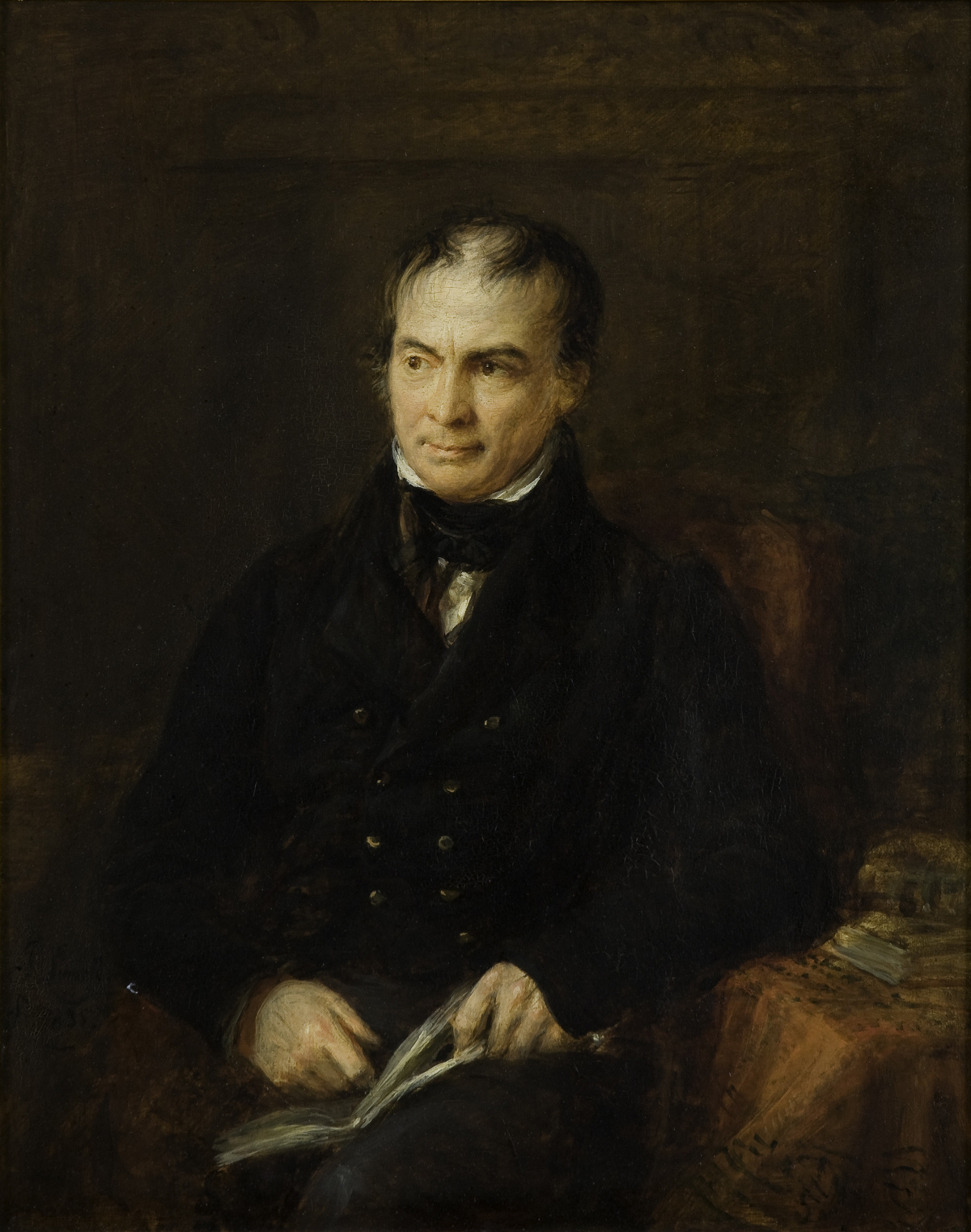
Pelham Warren, portrait by John Linnell

== Life ==
Born in London, he was the ninth son of Richard Warren, physician to George III, by his wife Elizabeth, daughter of Peter Shaw; Frederick Warren was his elder brother. He was educated at Dr. Thompson's school at Kensington and at Westminster School. He went on to Trinity College, Cambridge, matriculating in 1796.

Warren graduated M.B. in 1800 and M.D. on 2 July 1805. He started a medical practice in London immediately after he had taken his first degree in medicine, and on 6 April 1803 was elected physician to St George's Hospital, a post which he resigned in April 1816. His patients included Elizabeth Lamb, Viscountess Melbourne and George William Lefevre.

Admitted a candidate of the Royal College of Physicians on 30 September 1805, Warren became a fellow 30 September 1806. He was censor in 1810, Harveian orator in 1826, and elect 11 August 1829. He was elected fellow of the Royal Society on 8 April 1813. On 24 July 1830 he was gazetted physician extraordinary to William IV, but he declined the honour. He enjoyed one of the largest practices in London, despite manners that were cold and abrupt.

Warren died at Worting House, near Basingstoke, on 2 December 1835. He was buried in Worting church, where there was placed a tablet with an inscription by his friend Henry Vincent Bayley. He left £100,000, and, according to Sydney Smith, reckoned £30,000 of it was from treating gout.

== Works ==
Warren's published work was his Harveian oration, in Latin: Oratio Harveiana prima in Novis ædibus Collegii habita Sext. Kalend. Jul. an. mdcccxxvi, London, 1827, pp. 32, with a paper on headache in the Transactions of the Royal College of Physicians.

== Family ==
Warren married on 3 May 1814, Penelope, daughter of William Davies Shipley, who, with seven children, survived him.

== Notes ==
Attribution

This article incorporates text from a publication now in the public domain: Lee, Sidney, ed. (1899). "Warren, Pelham". Dictionary of National Biography. Vol. 59. London: Smith, Elder & Co.
