= Only a Lock of Hair =

Painting by John Everett Millais

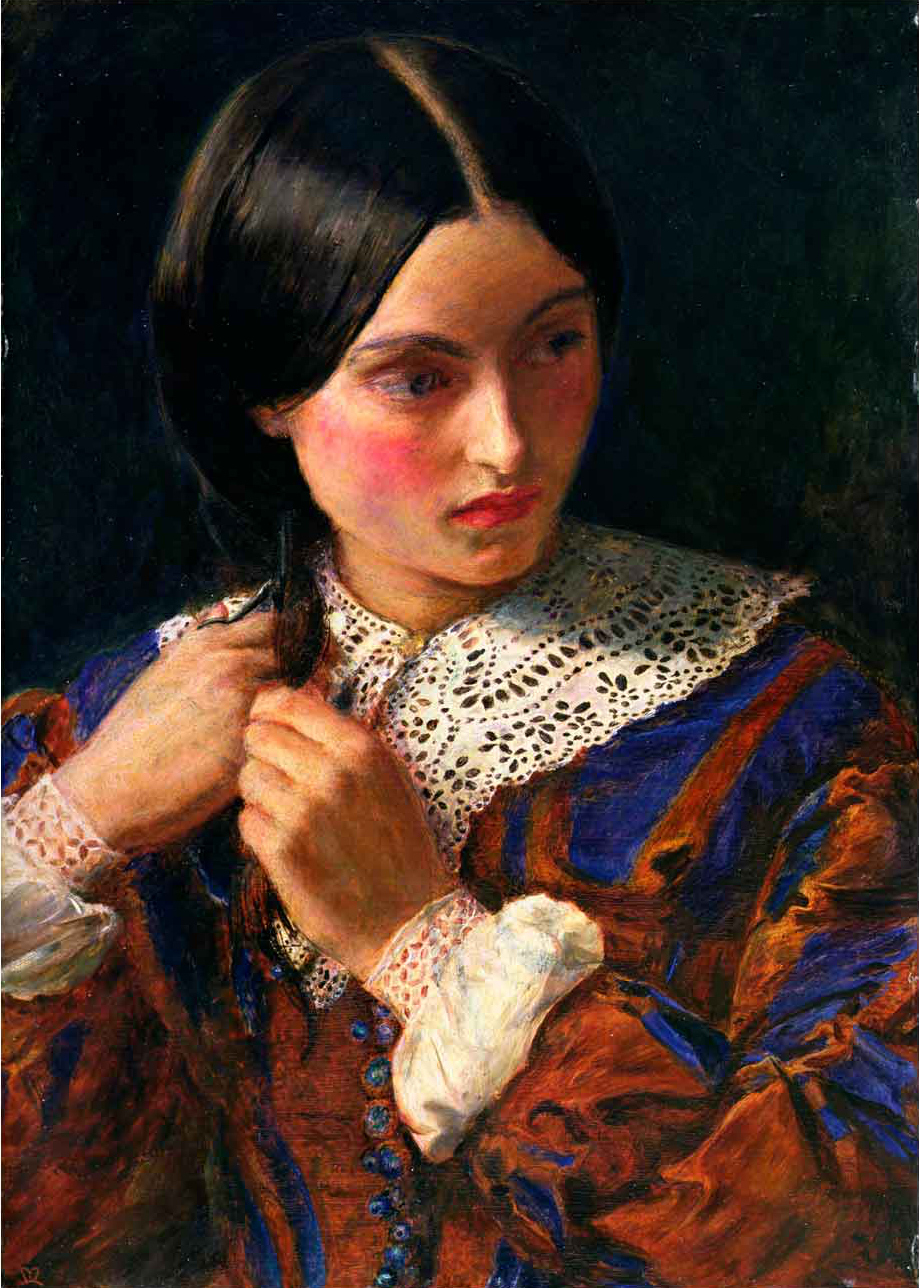
- Artist: John Everett Millais
- Year: 1857–58
- Type: Oil on panel
- Dimensions: 35.3 cm × 25 cm (13.9 in × 9.8 in)
- Location: Manchester City Art Gallery, Manchester

Only a Lock of Hair is an 1857–58 oil painting by the English artist John Everett Millais. The portrait shows a young woman in a dress russet-coloured fabric with areas of blue (possibly a shot silk, giving an iridescent effect) (Note: The Manchester Art Gallery page about the painting describes this as "striped blue and russet coloured fabric", but the stripes are non-continuous and more likely an optical effect of the material type.) with lace at the collar and cuffs, in the process of cutting off a lock of her hair with a small pair of silver scissors, while she gazes off to her left.

== The painting ==
The woman's expression has been described as "distant and melancholy" and "of intense contemplation". The background of the painting is dark and featureless, focusing attention on the subject of the portrait.

A lock of hair carried symbolic weight in the Victorian period. It was used as a mourning memento, often included in mourning jewellery. However, as the young woman is cutting her own hair, it is more likely that in this case that the lock is to be given as a love token, perhaps to be worn in a locket. The woman's expression might suggests all is not right - perhaps a separation is imminent. Dr Angela Hesson observed that "Hair jewellery, whether worn as a reminder of an absent loved one, or in memory of a deceased one, provided a literal sense of physical proximity to the object of affection."

The painting was gifted to Manchester City Art Gallery by Mr James Gresham in 1917, accession number 1917.268. This painting is the cover art of Penguin classics edition of Jane Eyre by Charlotte Bronte.

== See also ==
- List of paintings by John Everett Millais
