= Hair museum =

Displayed collection of organic material

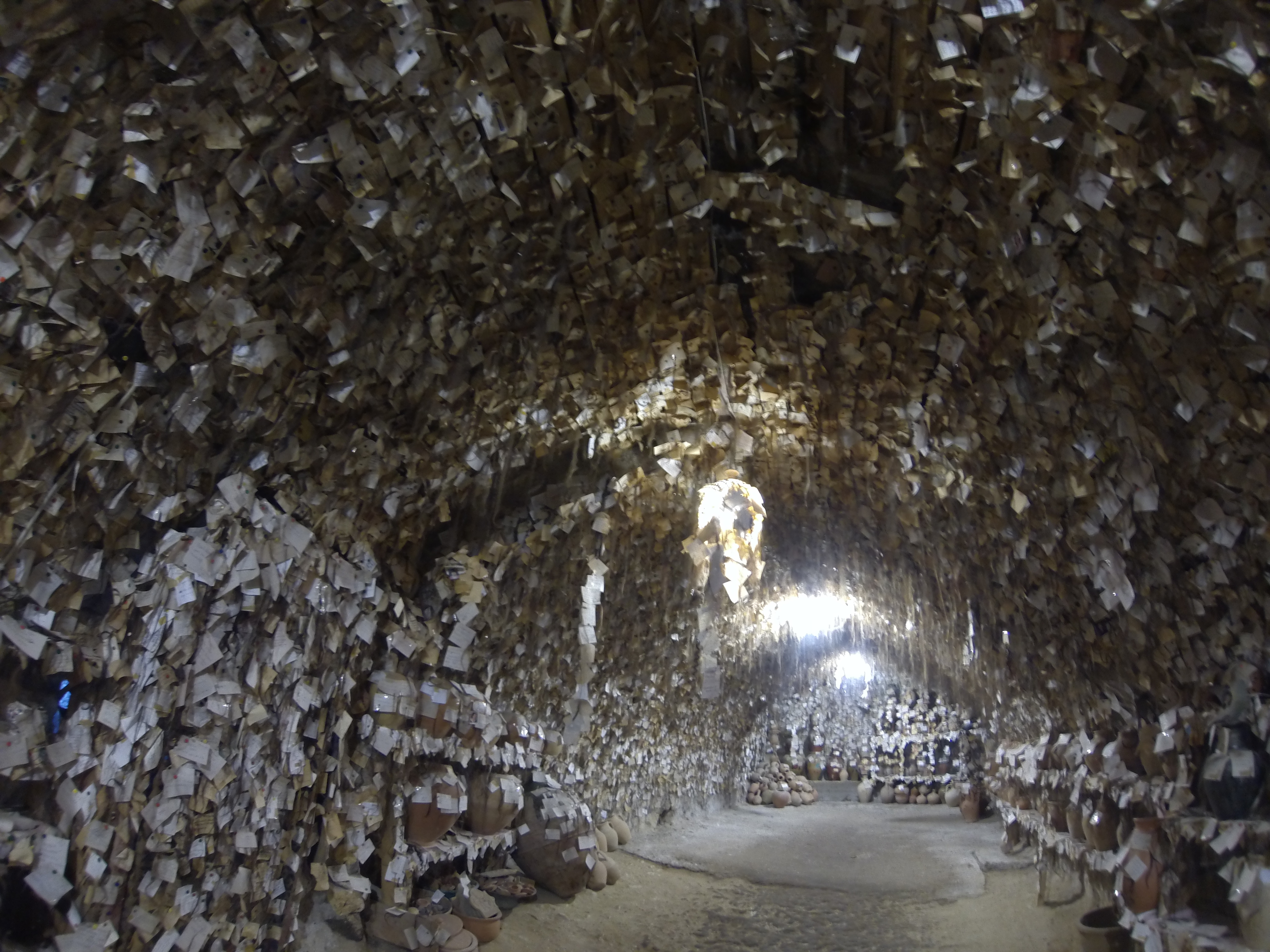
Avanos Hair Museum by Chez Galip. A collection of over 16,000 differently coloured locks of hair, from women all around the world.

A hair museum is a museum that displays a collection of hair, hair art, and/or hairwork (artworks made with hair), for example that of celebrities or loved ones. Hair museums date back to the 19th century.

== History of hairwork ==
Hairwork was a form of art that began in the 15th century and flourished in the Victorian era, especially in the form of mourning jewellery or lovelocks. It was used by people to keep the memory of a loved one before cameras were invented. According to the Minnesota history magazine hair art originated in England and France, then made its way to the United States. This form of art consisted of jewellery; necklaces, bracelets, rings, lockets, paintings, and medallions. These items would be embellished with strands of hair from a loved one.

== Notable hair museums ==
=== Avanos Hair Museum ===
A pottery centre and guest house in Avanos, Turkey, created the Avanos Hair Museum; it displays a collection of thousands of locks of hair, all from female visitors. Reportedly the local potter, Chez Galip, was bidding farewell to a friend of his when he asked for something to remember her by, and she cut off a piece of her hair to leave as a memorial. He put it up in his shop, and told the story to the visitors and tourists who passed through. Other women who enjoyed the story left a piece of their hair as well.

The museum started in 1979 when a selection was put up for display. It now holds an estimated 16,000 samples by the museum's own count and is included in the Guinness Book of World Records. The hair strands are exhibited from the walls and ceiling of the shop's cave.

Twice a year, in June and December, the first customer who comes in Chez Galip’s shop is invited down into the Hair Museum to choose ten winners from the walls. (Note: The hair strands are left with a card attached to it that contains the contact information of the hair donor.) These ten receive an all-expenses-paid week-long vacation in Cappadocia, where they participate in the shop's pottery workshops for free.

=== Leila's Hair Museum ===
One of the most famous and oldest hair museums was Leila's Hair Museum, located in Kansas City, USA. The collection displayed contained items dating back to the 18th century. It was closed in September 2025.
