= Lovelock (hair) =

Long lock of hair resting over the left shoulder

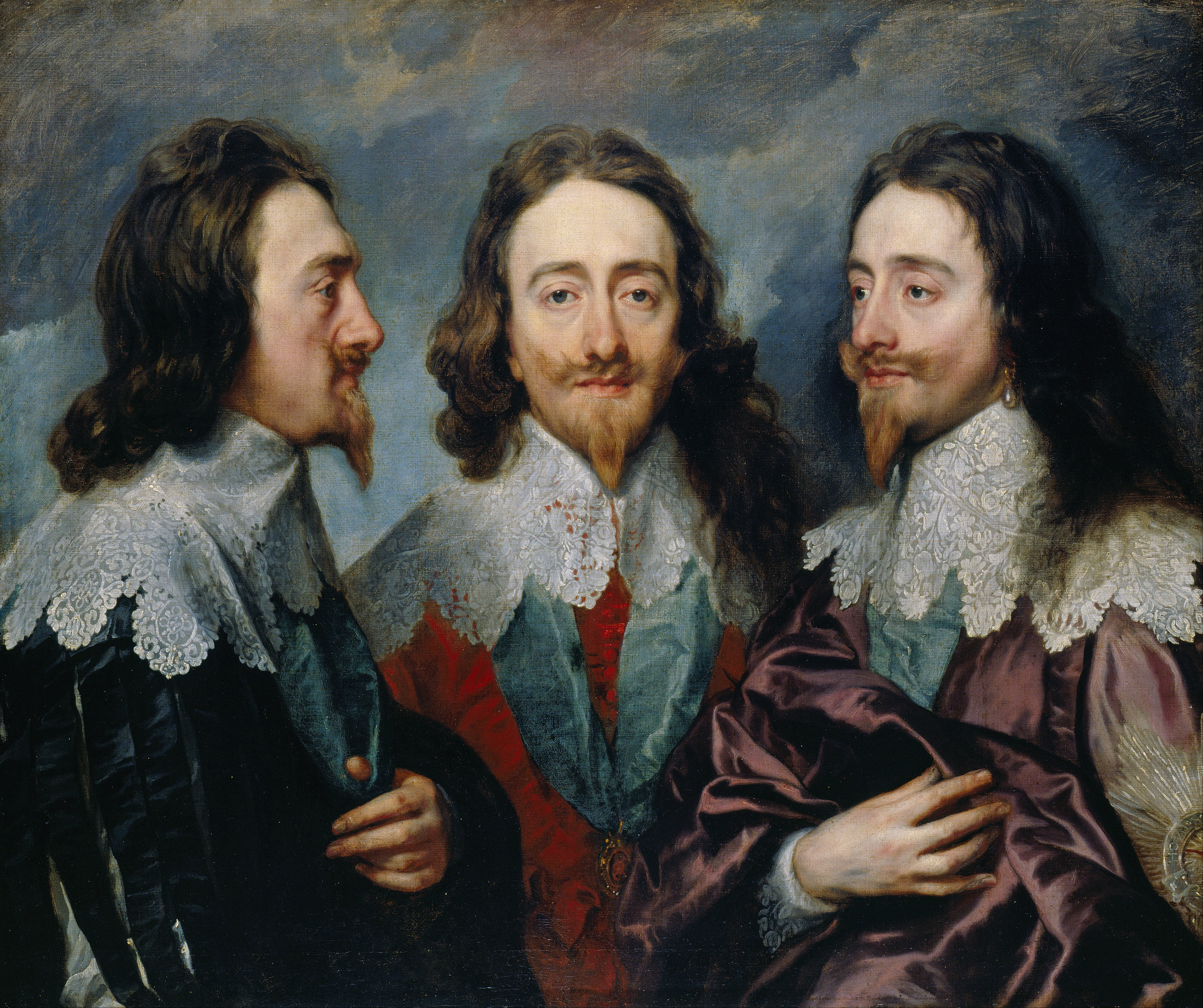
Charles I in Three Positions, also known as the Triple portrait of Charles I by Sir Antony van Dyck in the Royal Collection. The views on the right show Charles' lovelock

A lovelock is a hairstyle that was popular amongst European "men of fashion" from the end of the 16th century until well into the 17th century. The lovelock was a long lock of hair, often plaited (braided) and made to rest over the left shoulder (the heart side) to show devotion to a loved one.

== Origin ==
Most sources contemporary with the rise of the fashion in the mid-1500s thought the lovelock was worn in imitation of an American Indian hairstyle. People such as Francis Higginson—Salem, Massachusetts's first minister—"reported [in his 1630 book New-Englands Plantation] speculation that the style of wearing one long lock of hair among fashionable young men in England was conscious imitation of the asymmetrical Powhatan male cut." Sir Thomas Dale, governor of Jamestown and John Rolfe, the husband of Pocahontas, also believed that the trend was a conscious imitation of Indian hairstyling. They further specified that lovelocks had arrived in England with the group of Roanoke colonists rescued by Sir Francis Drake in June 1586.

The supposed Indian origin of the lovelock was of great concern to Puritan ministers on both sides of the Atlantic. In England, William Prynne and in New England, Roger Williams both denounced lovelocks from their pulpits, calling them demonic copyings of Native American behavior. Each took strongly moralistic tacks, with Prynne decrying lovelocks as "Effeminate, Proud, Lascivious, Exorbitant, and Fantastique."

At least one contemporary Indian also believed European lovelocks were worn in imitation of Native Americans. In 1616 Samuel Purchas was introduced to Tomocomo shortly after the Powhatan holy man arrived in London with his ward, Pocahontas. Tomocomo told Purchas that lovelocks were worn by Indians in imitation of their god. After learning this Purchas, like Prynn and Williams, became morally inflamed by the American theory of origin, calling it "a faire unlovely generation of the Love-locke, Christians imitating Salvages, and they the Divell."

Others favor European origins: Robin Bryer, author of The History of Hair: Fashion and Fantasy Down the Ages (2003), speculated that the lovelock instead originated as an alternative to the love token worn by knights during the medieval period.

== Examples ==
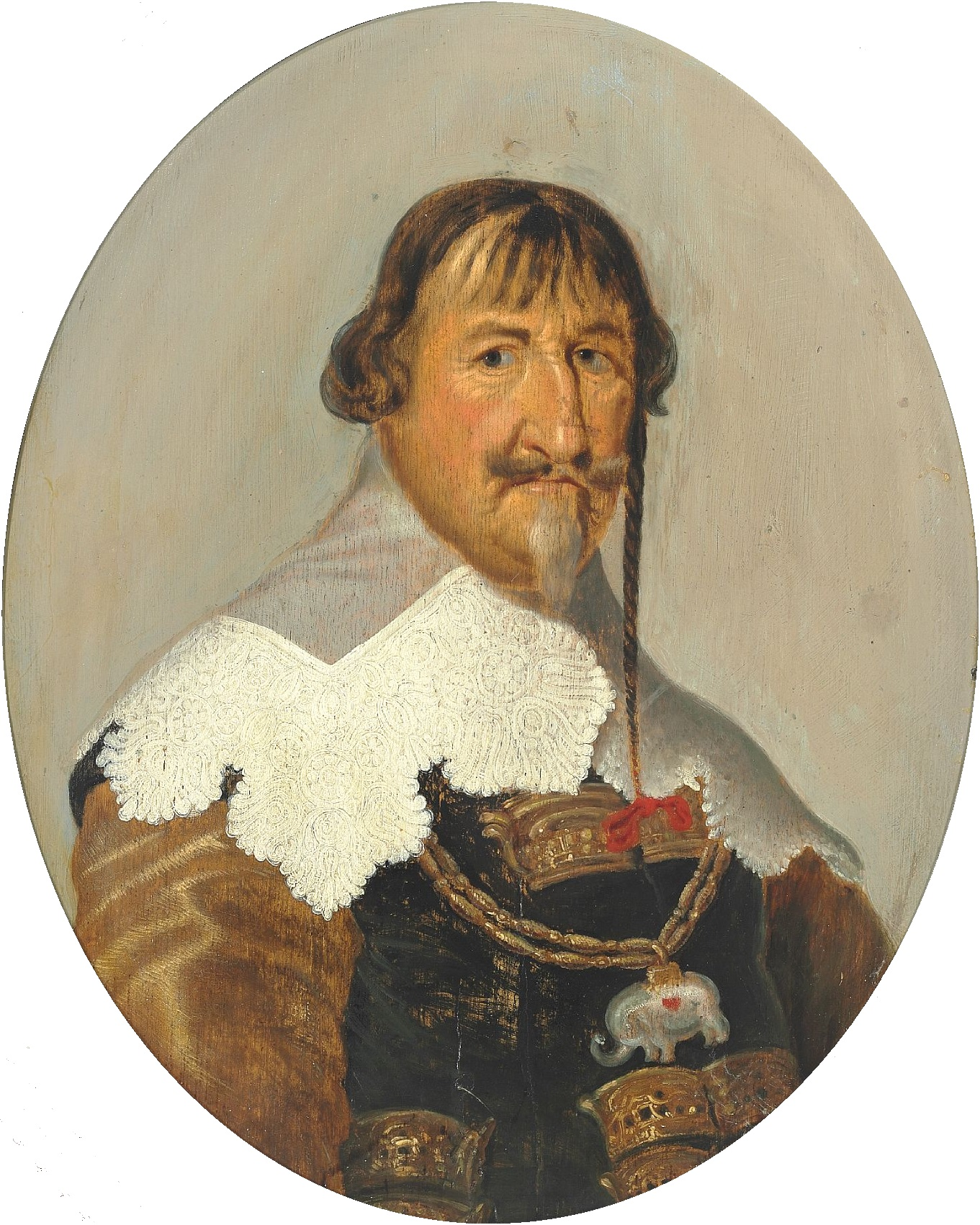
King Christian IV of Denmark

Christian IV of Denmark (1577–1648) wore a lovelock, possibly because of a medical condition plica polonica, and others in his court copied it, making it a Danish court fashion. His brother-in-law James I of England (1566–1625) wore a lovelock, and at the court of his son, Charles I (1600–1649) many courtiers (including women) wore them in the French fashion (where they were called cadenette). Charles I can be seen wearing one in the Triple portrait by Antony van Dyck, where a large pearl can be seen suspended from the end of the lock.

== Criticism ==
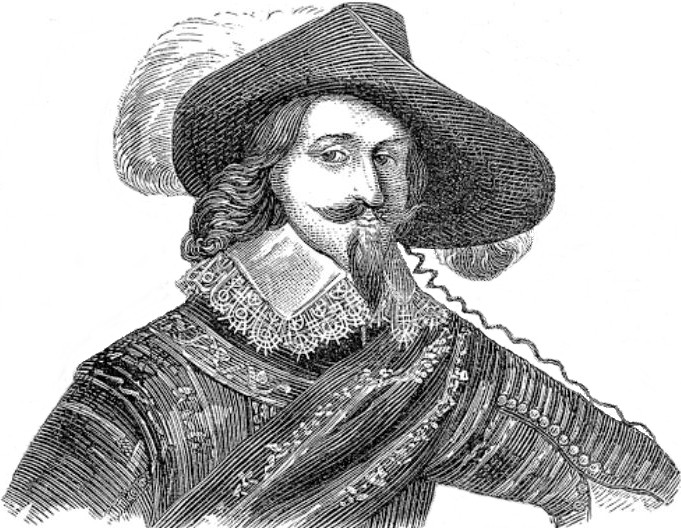
Sir Thomas Meautys (1592–1649) with a long lovelock.

As seen above, criticism of the lovelock often assumed an extreme moralistic tone. Although European preachers took exception to white men wearing lovelocks in imitation of Native Americans, their criticisms were based on religious rather than racial objections. This was partly due to the supposed devil-worship of Indians but mainly because the set of assumptions about human nature and its heritability that attends objections on what are now recognized as racist grounds, had not yet fully developed by the early 17th century.

Nevertheless, by the 1620s religious objections to the lovelock had coalesced around a series of moral criticisms. In 1628 William Prynne, a Puritan pamphleteer, wrote Health's Sickness. The Unloveliness of Lovelocks. Prynne stated that for men to wear their hair long was "unseemly and unlawful unto Christians", while it was "mannish, unnatural, impudent, and unchristian" for women to cut it short. He related the story of a nobleman who was dangerously ill, and who, on his recovery, "declared publicly his detestation of his effeminate, fantastic lovelock, which he then sensibly perceived to be but a cord of vanity, by which he had given the Devil holdfast to lead him at his pleasure, and who would never resign his prey as long as he nourished this unlovely bush", and so he ordered the barber to cut it off. In 1654 Thomas Hall wrote a pamphlet The Loathsomnesse of Long Haire. ... in which he also attacked lovelocks.

== See also ==
- Dreadlocks
- List of hairstyles
