= Hairwork =

Type of jewelry crafted from human hair

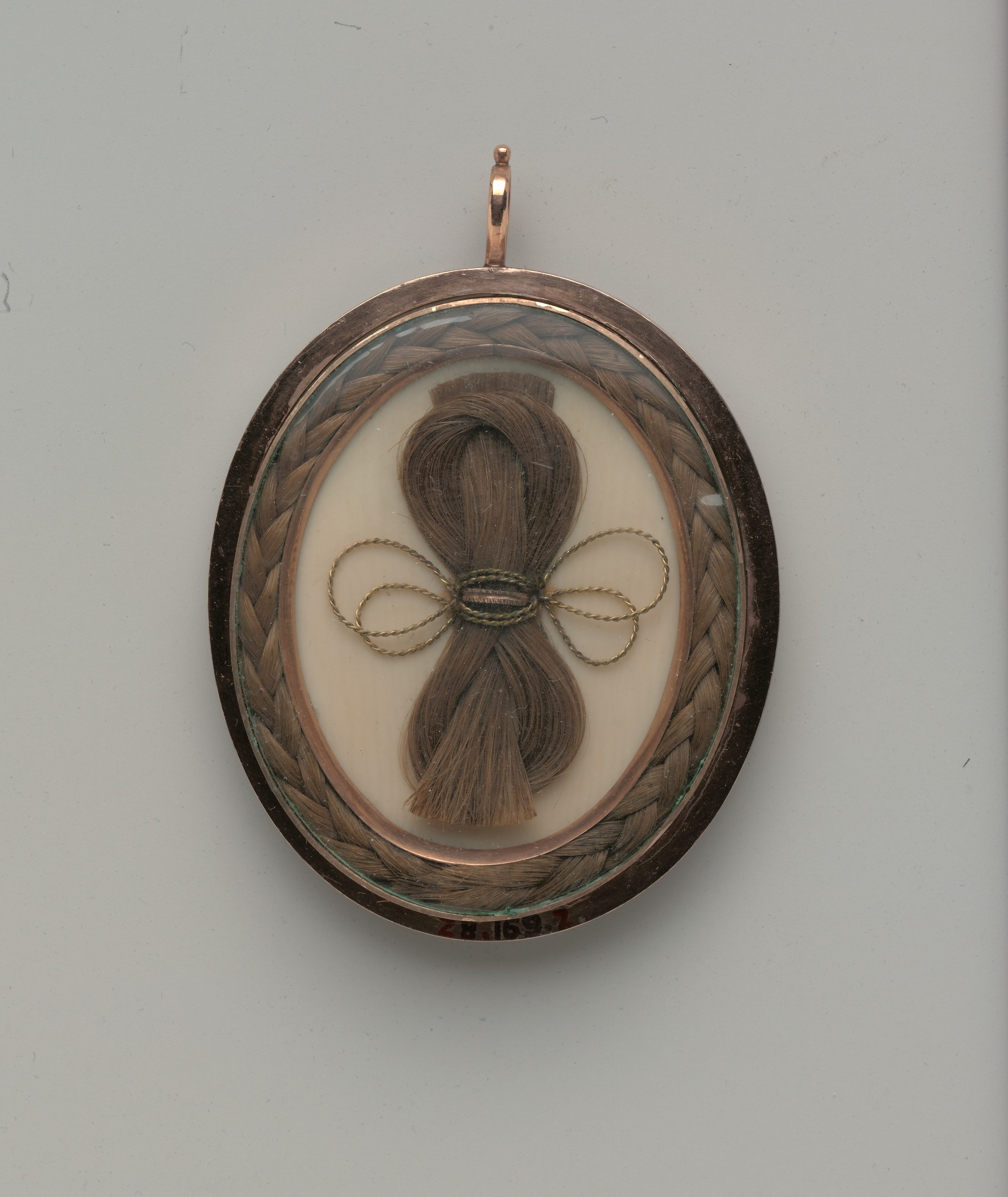
Mrs. Gabriel Manigault (Margaret Izard), converse of miniature portrait, circa 1795

Hairwork, or jewelry or artwork made of human hair, has appeared throughout the history of craft work, particularly to be used for private worship or mourning. From the Middle Ages through the early twentieth century, memorial hair jewelry remained common. Hair, considered to be a remnant off the person it was cut from, also has often played a part in myths and legends; in a Swedish book of proverbs, one can read that “rings and bracelets of hair increase love” (Vadstena stads tankebok). One example can be found in Denmark, at Rosensborg’s palace, which is a bracelet of precious metal with a simple braided lock of hair - a gift from King Christian IV (1577-1648) to his queen. Another example would be the rings commemorating the execution of King Charles I of England (1600-1649), which circulated among his faithful supporters. Other famous people who owned hair jewelry include Napoleon, Admiral Nelson, Queen Victoria and her large family, Christina Nilsson and Jenny Lind.

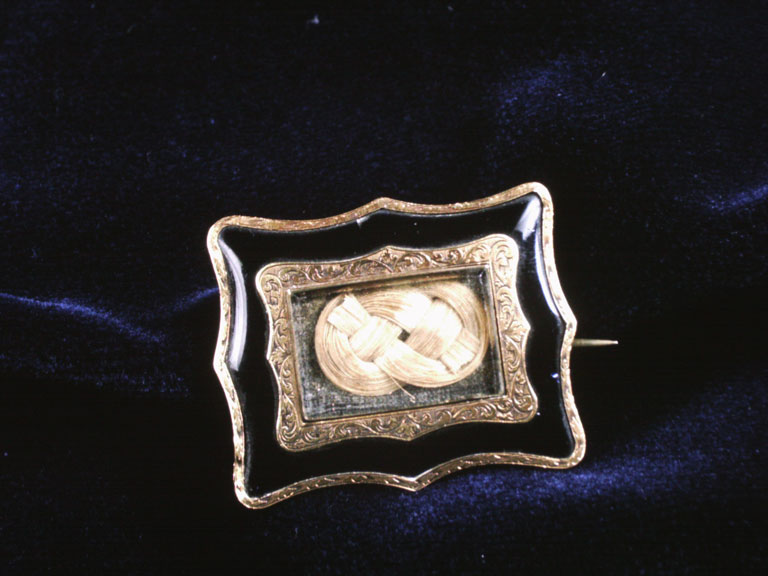
A 19th-century hair brooch, in the collection of The Children's Museum of Indianapolis

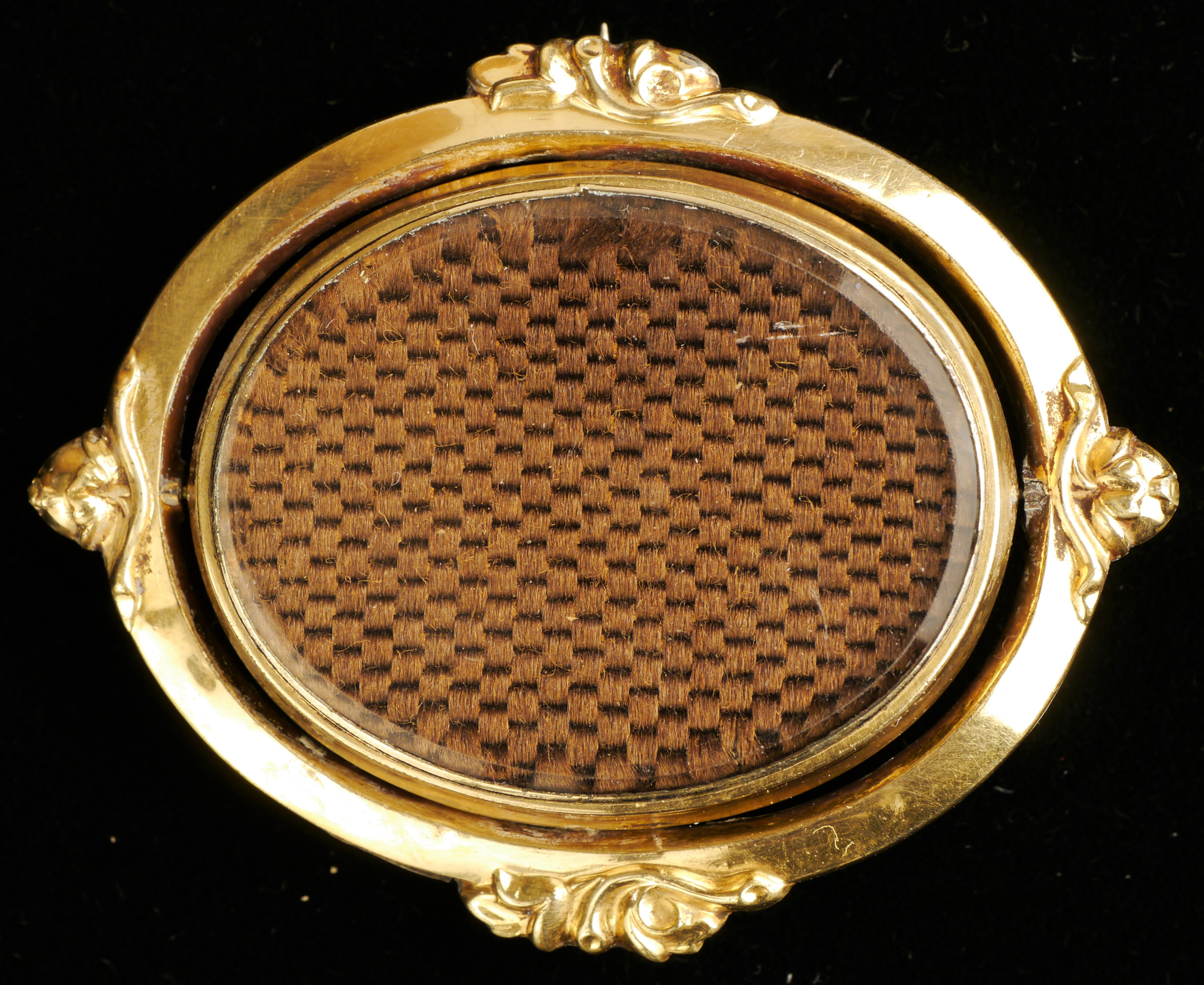
Victorian hair mourning jewelry

== Victorian Period ==
Although hairwork existed prior to the Victorian era, it was this period that saw it flourish as a trade and private craft in mourning jewelry such as lockets, rings, and bracelets; or mourning hair works for the home. These included frames containing loved ones' locks in braids or wreaths or woven into floral patterns or "mourning scenes" like gravestones or willow trees, depicted by hair placement. When not related to mourning, the practice was still performed in a commemorative or honoring fashion, with hairworks being produced to celebrate the hair-givers personal achievements, or to signify a bond between friends, family, and loved ones. It was a common skill taught to young women of the period, sometimes being mixed with needlework.

The Victorian Period saw a rise in mourning practices due to its popularity through Queen Victoria, and wearing hair jewelry was seen as a form of carrying one's sentiments for the deceased. Unlike many other natural materials, human hair does not decay with the passing of time. Hair has chemical qualities that cause it to last for hundreds, possibly thousands, of years. Additionally, by the 19th century many hair artists and wig makers had too little employment after the powdered wigs, often worn by noblemen of the 17th and 18th centuries, went out of fashion. The period of sentimentality, characteristic of the Victorian era, offered these craftsmen a new opportunity to earn their income working with hair. Early hair jewelry was usually made for the higher classes in cooperation with goldsmiths, producing beautiful and expensive creations of hair mounted in gold and often decorated with pearls or precious stones. Pieces constructed with precious materials by artisans were naturally very expensive and it was not until the middle of the Victorian period, when instructional guides became available, that hair jewelry became popular with the lower classes.

Workshops where these fashionable items were made existed across Europe. Buyers of human hair traveled the countryside and purchased hair from poor peasants, sometimes in exchange for scarves, ribbons or other small luxury objects. In addition to the needs for hair jewelry, there was still a need for great amounts of hair for braids and switches that women wanted to purchase for their coiffures. Most hair jewelry, however, was made from a person of special interest's hair, whether that was a famous figure or - most often - a family member or friend.

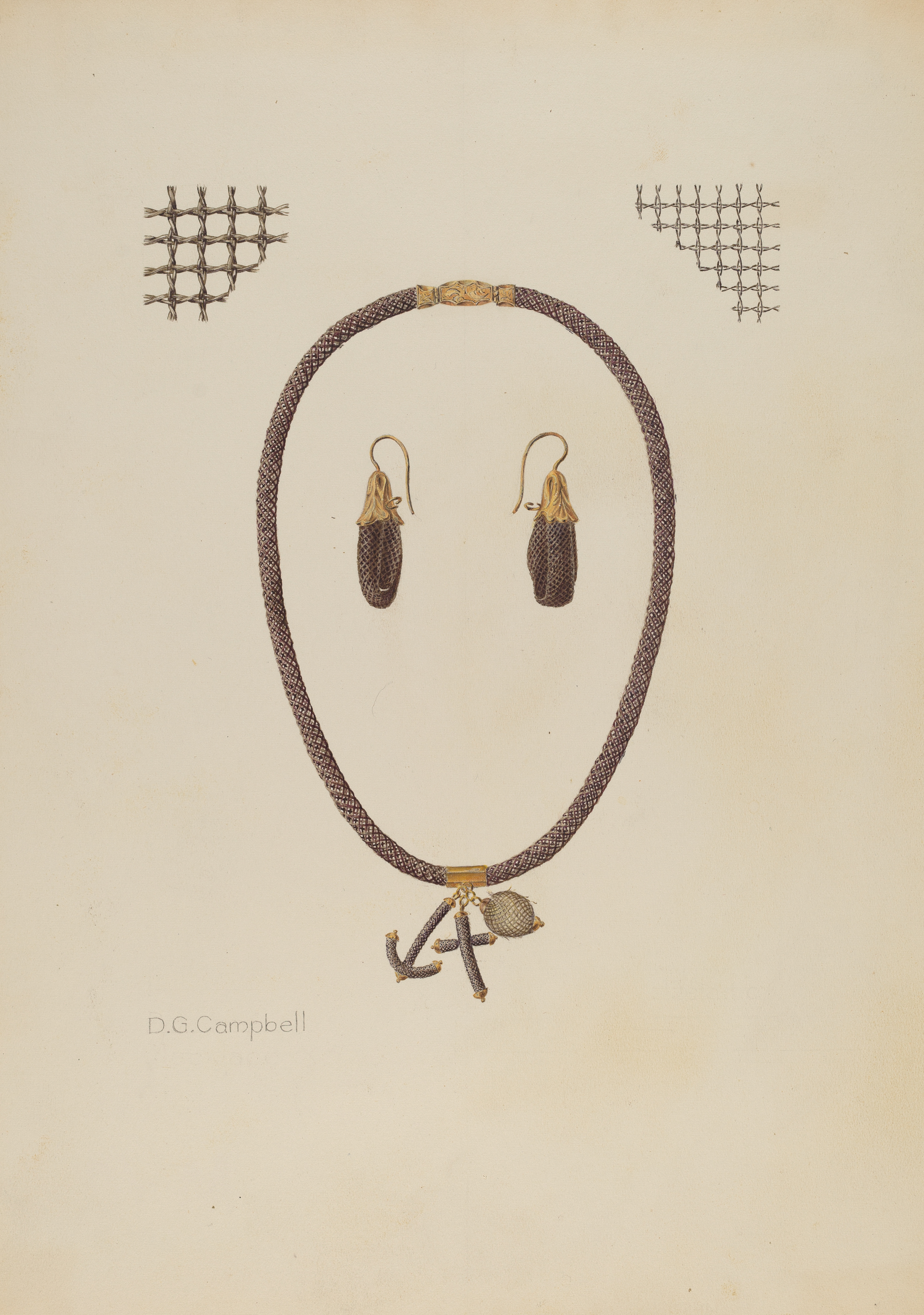
Watercolor rendering of hair jewelry by Douglas Campbell, c. 1940, created for the Index of American Design

In contrast to the expensive pieces of hair jewelry crafted by artisans, many women of the 19th century began crafting their own hairwork in their homes. In America, popular magazines of the period, like Godey's Lady's Book, printed patterns and offered starter kits with the necessary tools for sale. Books of the period, like Mark Campbell's Self-Instructor in the Art of Hair Work offered full volumes devoted to hairwork and other "fancywork," as predominantly female crafts were known at the time.

In Europe, various groups of women also took up the craft in their homes. For example, the women of Mora, Sweden, became experienced in hairwork and made it possible for groups other than the very wealthy to afford hair jewelry. They had no money to buy expensive findings, so they mounted the jewelry with wooden beads that they cleverly covered over with hair. One of the most famous of these women was Martis Karin Ersdotter.

Another reason for the construction of hair jewelry in the home was a lack of trust in commercial manufacturers. The concern was that the hair used in the jewelry would not be the hair that had been given to the jeweler, having been substituted with other hair. Individual hair-working companies attempted to counter the suspicion by producing adverts that stressed that they used the hair sent to them. These adverts may however have added to the level of suspicion since they tended to at least imply that other companies did not.

== Modern Period ==
Though hairwork had gone out of fashion more than a half century earlier around Europe, the people of Våmhus (where much hairwork was created) began to realize what a treasure the knowledge of the trade was. The local historical society introduced classes in hair work and new generations of women learned the art. In Våmhus, hair art has been done continuously for almost 200 years.

In 1994, the Hairworkers Society was founded by the most active hair workers. Together they have done many shows, exhibits and projects. Similarly, the Victorian Hairwork Society also offers a space for members to share their art, identify historical pieces, and request work to be crafted online.

== Long term preservation ==
In Victorian and older pieces the gum used to hold the hair and other decorations in place has often decayed over time resulting of movement of hair within the pieces.

== See also ==
- Lovelock, a long lock of hair worn to show devotion to a loved one
- Hair museum, a museum that displays hair and/or hairworks
