= Frederick Warren =

Vice-Admiral Frederick Warren
- Born: 24 March 1775
- Died: March 22, 1848 (aged 72–73); East Court, Cosham, Portsmouth
- Relatives: Richard Warren (father); Pelham Warren (brtother); Richard Laird Warren (son)
- Military career
- Allegiance: United Kingdom
- Branch: Royal Navy
- Service years: 1789–1848
- Rank: Vice-Admiral
- Commands: HMS Shark; HMS Fairy; HMS Daedalus; HMS Meleager; HMS Melpomene; HMS Argo; HMS Clarence; HMS Spartiate; Cape of Good Hope Station
- Conflicts: French Revolutionary Wars; Napoleonic Wars; Gunboat War

Vice-Admiral Frederick Warren (24 March 1775 – 22 March 1848) was an officer of the Royal Navy who served during the French Revolutionary and Napoleonic Wars, and the Gunboat War.

== Life ==
Born on 24 March 1775, he was son of Richard Warren the physician, and elder brother of Pelham Warren. He was admitted to Westminster School on 15 January 1783, and entered the navy in March 1789, on board HMS Adamant, flagship of Sir Richard Hughes on the Halifax station.

When the Adamant was paid off in 1792, Warren was sent to HMS Lion with Captain Erasmus Gower, and in her made the voyage to China. Shortly after his return, on 24 October 1794, he was confirmed in the rank of lieutenant and appointed to HMS Prince George. He then served in HMS Jason on the home station, and in HMS Latona off Newfoundland, where he was promoted on 10 August 1797 to command the sloop HMS Shark. In 1800 he commanded HMS Fairy in the West Indies.

== Naval captain of the Napoleonic Wars ==
On 12 May 1801 Warren was promoted to the rank of captain. On the renewal of the war in 1803 after the Peace of Amiens he had for three years the command of the sea fencibles of the Dundee district; in November 1806 he was appointed to HMS Daedalus, and took her out to the West Indies, where in April 1808 he was moved to HMS Meleager, which was wrecked near Port Royal on 30 July 1808. Warren was acquitted of all blame, and officially complimented on the exertions he had made after the ship struck.

In 1809 Warren commanded HMS Melpomene in the Baltic Sea for a few months, acting for Sir Peter Parker, 2nd Baronet, who was on sick leave. On the night of 29–30 May he fought a severe action in the Danish Straits with about twenty Danish gunboats. At daybreak the wind freshened and the gunboats retired; but the Melpomene had lost thirty-four men, killed and wounded; both hull and masts had suffered much damage, and her rigging was cut to pieces. She was shortly afterwards sent to England and paid off.

In December 1809 Warren was appointed to the 44-gun HMS Argo, which he commanded on the Lisbon station and in the Mediterranean for nearly three years. In 1814 he commanded the 74-gun HMS Clarence in the English Channel.

== Later life ==
From 1825 to 1830 Warren commanded HMS Spartiate. He was promoted to be rear-admiral on 22 July 1830; from 1831 to 1834 he was commander-in-chief at the Cape of Good Hope Station, and from 1837 to 1841 admiral-superintendent at Plymouth. He was made a vice-admiral on 23 November 1841. Warren died at his abode, East Cosham Court, Wymering, Hampshire on 22 March 1848 and was buried at St Peter and St Paul, Wymering.

== Family ==
Warren married, in 1804, Mary, only daughter of Rear-Admiral David Laird of Strathmartine House, Dundee, and had issue. His eldest son, Richard Laird Warren, died an admiral in 1875.

== See also ==
- O'Byrne, William Richard (1849). "Warren, Frederic" . A Naval Biographical Dictionary . John Murray – via Wikisource.

== Notes ==
Attribution

This article incorporates text from a publication now in the public domain: Lee, Sidney, ed. (1899). "Warren, Frederick". Dictionary of National Biography. Vol. 59. London: Smith, Elder & Co.

Military offices
Preceded by Charles Schomberg	Commander-in-Chief, Cape of Good Hope Station; 1831–1834	Succeeded by Patrick Campbell
