= George William Lefevre =

English physician

Sir George William Lefevre MD (1798 – 12 February 1846) was an English medical doctor and travel writer.

== Life ==
Lefevre was born at Berkhampstead, Hertfordshire.

After apprenticeship to a local practitioner of medicine in Shropshire, he studied medicine at the University of Edinburgh, and at Guy's and Saint Thomas' hospitals in London, and graduated with a Doctor of Medicine at the University of Aberdeen, 4 August 1819.

He was vulnerable to pulmonary disease, and on the advice of Pelham Warren decided to go abroad. After vain attempts to obtain an Indian appointment, he met Thomas Douglas, 5th Earl of Selkirk, who wanted to travel to the warm climate of southern Spain with his family and agreed to bring young Doctor Lefevre as his travelling physician. Before crossing the Pyrenees, they stopped at Pau in mid-October 1819. Lefevre wrote about their ride the following day:

Everything that I had hitherto beheld appeared insignificant compared with the scenery which now presented itself... under our feet extended a long plain of meadowland, through which the Gave serpentined in a quick and bubbling stream. The foreground was bounded by a long ridge of hills covered with the vines festooning from their summits to their feet; backed by forest and bounded by the Pyrenees stretching along the horizon, resembled, by their rugged summits, the back bone of the globe... The sight of all this grandeur determined the party upon making Pau their winter quarters.

After Lord Selkirk's death in April 1820, Lefevre visited the mineral springs of Eaux-Bonnes and Eaux-Chaudes, returned to Pau and then climbed what he believed to be Mont Perdu in Haute-Pyrenees and finally to Saint-Sauveur. Excited by the scenery and liberty of mountain solitude, Lefevre said "it lifts the soul from nature up to nature's God". He did not venture into Spain, describing himself as a heretic and mentioning the dangers of being burned in Spain, while describing the inhabitants of Bearn and Bigorre as friendly and good-natured, or bonhomie, finally saying:

I felt I could have remained there forever. I could say, at least, with Mary Stuart, "that my heart was still there".

Lefevre then returned to England and tried to get into practice. He was admitted a licentiate of the College of Physicians of London on 1 April 1822. Having failed in a candidature as physician to a dispensary, he decided to go abroad again, and, through the influence of Benjamin Travers, became physician to a Polish nobleman, with whom he travelled for nine years: five in France and the rest in Austria, Poland, and the Russian Empire. He finally left the post at Odessa and went to Saint Petersburg, where he began in private practice, and became physician to the British Embassy. In 1831 he was appointed to the charge of a district during the cholera epidemic.

In 1832 Lefevre was in England for a short time, but returned to Russia, and was shortly knighted by patent as a reward for his services to the embassy. He settled in London in 1842, and was admitted a fellow of the College of Physicians, 30 September. He resided in Brook Street, Grosvenor Square, and in 1845 delivered the Lumleian lectures at the College of Physicians. He suffered from depression, and on 12 February 1846 committed suicide by swallowing prussic acid, at the house of his friend Dr Nathaniel Grant in Thayer Street, Manchester Square, London.

== Works ==
Lefevre published, in London, Observations on the Nature and Treatment of the Cholera Morbus now prevailing epidemically in St. Petersburg. Experience led him to oppose the indiscriminate use of calomel and opium in the treatment of cholera, to favour the use of purgatives, and to avoid that of astringents.

In 1843 he published The Life of a Travelling Physician in three volumes. It is a memoir of his travels, and is mainly known for its description of social life in Poland and at the English factory at Saint Petersburg. It was published without his name, but was acknowledged later. In the same year he published Advantages of Thermal Comfort (enlarged edition 1844). It is a short treatise on the temperature of rooms, clothing, and bedmaking, suggested by his Russian experience of a severe climate.

In 1844 he published An Apology for the Nerves, or their Influence and Importance in Health and Disease, a collection of medical notes including one on plica polonica.

== Notes ==
Attribution

This article incorporates text from a publication now in the public domain: Lee, Sidney, ed. (1892). "Lefevre, George William". Dictionary of National Biography. Vol. 32. London: Smith, Elder & Co.
