= Peter Shaw (physician) =

English physician and medical author

Peter Shaw (1694–1763) was an English physician and medical author.

== Life ==
Shaw was the son of Robert Shaw, A.M., master of the grammar school at Lichfield. After passing some years of professional life at Scarborough, he was practising physic in London in 1726, apparently without a degree or the licence of the Royal College of Physicians, but did not permanently settle there until some years later.

On 25 June 1740 he was admitted a licentiate of the College of Physicians, being then a doctor of medicine, but of what university is not recorded. In London he attained popularity as a physician. He was patronised by Sir Edward Hulse, one of the court physicians, at that point gradually withdrawing from practice. He was admitted a candidate at the College of Physicians on 16 April 1753, and was made a fellow on 8 April of the following year.

In 1752 he was appointed physician-extraordinary to George II, and the same year was created doctor of medicine at Cambridge by royal mandate. Two years later he was promoted to be physician-in-ordinary to the king, and he was the usual medical attendant on George II in his journeys to Hanover. He was nominated to the same office on the accession of George III. He died on 15 March 1763, aged 69 years, and was buried in the nave of Wimbledon church, where there was an inscription to his memory.

== Works ==
He contributed to the study of chemistry in England by his translations of the works of Georg Ernst Stahl and Herman Boerhaave, as well as his own writings and lectures. Shaw was prolific if careless. He was editor of the works of Francis Bacon and Robert Boyle.

Shaw's translations or adaptations included:

- The Dispensatory of the Royal College of Physicians of Edinburgh, from the Latin, London, 1727.
- A New Method of Chemistry, including the Theory and Practice of the Art, a translation of Boerhaave's Institutiones Chemiæ, London, 1727.
- Philosophical Principles of Universal Chemistry, from the Collegium Jenense of G. E. Stahl, London, 1730.
- New Experiments and Observations upon Mineral Waters, by Dr. F. Hoffman, extracted from his works, with notes, &c.
- Pharmacopœia Edinburgensis, translated 1746–8.
- Novum Organum Scientiarum (Bacon), translated 1802, (another edition 1818).

His original publications were:

- The Dispensatory of the Royal College of Physicians, London, 1721.
- A Treatise of Incurable Diseases, London, 1723.
- Prælectiones Pharmaceuticæ, or a course of lectures in pharmacy, 1723.
- The Juice of the Grape, or Wine preferable to Water, 1724.
- A New Practice of Physic, 8vo, London, 1726; 2nd edit. 1728; the 7th edit. appeared in 1753.
- Three Essays in Artificial Philosophy, or Universal Chemistry, London, 1731.
- An Essay for introducing a Portable Laboratory, by means whereof all the Chemical Operations are commodiously performed for the purposes of Philosophy, Medicinal Metalurgy, and Family; with sculptures, London, 1731 (in conjunction with Francis Hauksbee).
- Chemical Lectures read in London in 1731 and 1732, and at Scarborough in 1733, for the Improvement of Arts, Trades, and Natural Philosophy, London, 1734.
- An Inquiry into the Contents and Virtues of the Scarborough Spa, London, 1734.
- Examination of the Reasons for and against the Subscription for a Medicament for the Stone, London, 1738.
- Inquiries on the Nature of Miss Stephens's Medicaments, London, 1738.
- Essays for the Improvement of Arts, Manufactures, and Commerce, by means of Chemistry, London, 1761.
- Proposals for a Course of Chemical Experiments, with a view to Practical Philosophy, Arts, Trade, and Business, London, 1761 (with Francis Hauksbee).

== Family ==
He married Frances, daughter of John Hyde of Quorndon in Leicestershire. His daughter Elizabeth became the wife of Dr. Richard Warren, who commended his father-in-law's services to literature and science in his Harveian Oration for 1768.
