= Polish plait =

Formation of hair

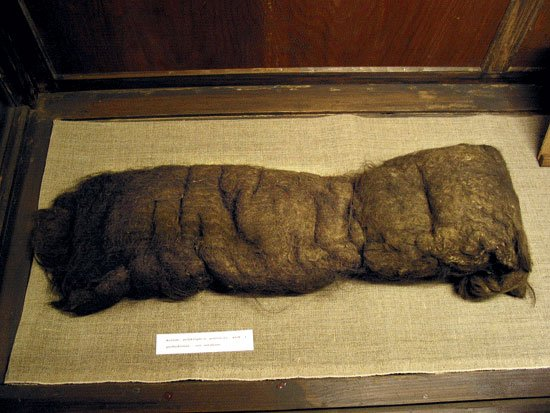
A Polish plait in the Museum of the Faculty of Medicine, Medical College, Jagiellonian University, Kraków, Poland

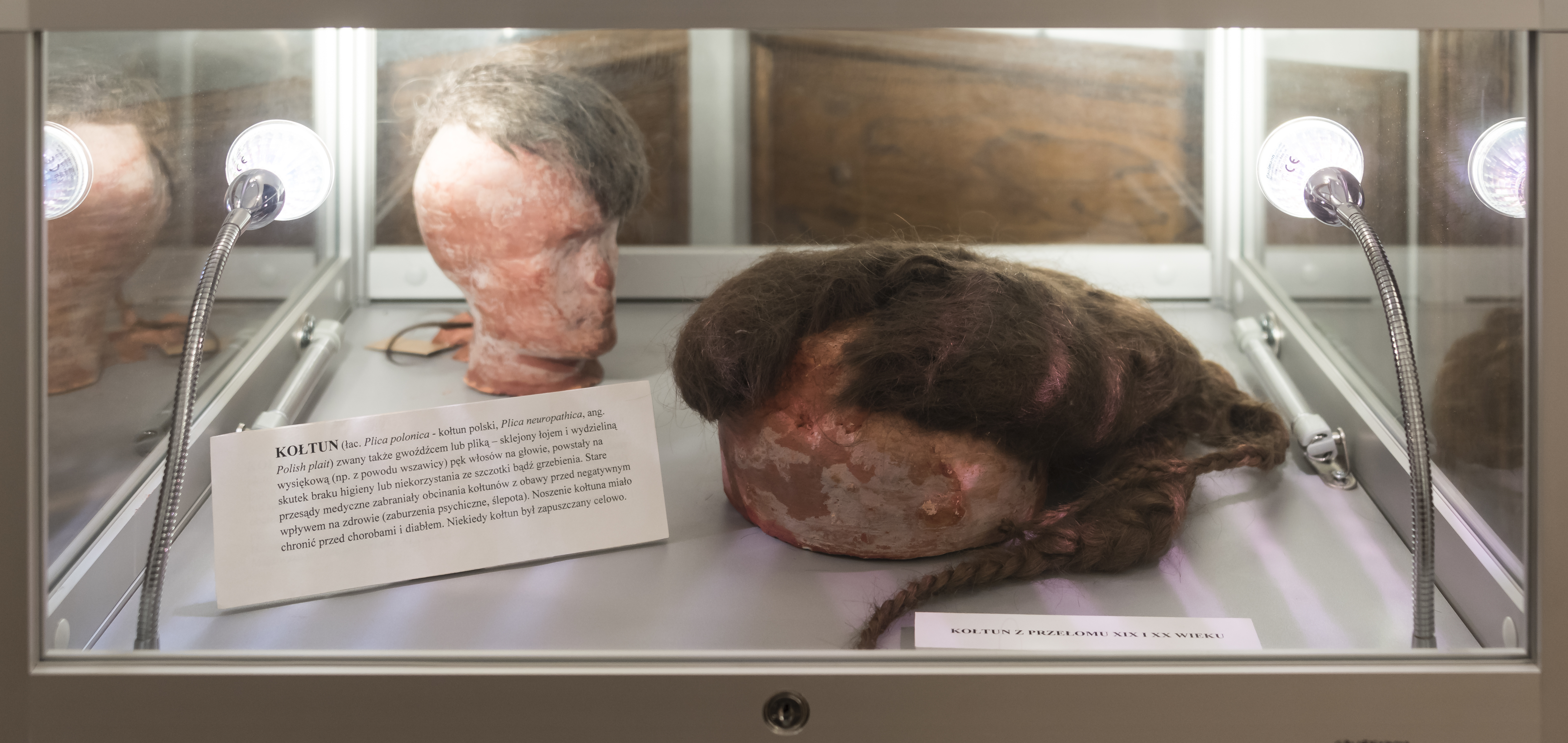
A Polish plait on display at the Central Medical Library in Warsaw

Polish plait (Latin: Plica polonica, Polish: Kołtun polski or plika, Kołtun in Polish meaning matted), less commonly known in English as plica or trichoma, is a particular formation of hair. This term can refer to either a hairstyle or a medical condition, depending on context. The term is connected to a system of beliefs in European folklore and healing practices in the traditional medicine of the Polish–Lithuanian Commonwealth that believed matted hair to be an amulet, or a catchment or trajectory for illness to leave the body.

== As a medical condition ==
Plica polonica (synonym, plica neuropathica; common name Polish plait) is an uncommon condition in which the hair shaft becomes entangled irreversibly, forming a matted mass that may be sticky and moist.

In this condition the protective layer of hair (cuticle) is damaged and the cortex of the hair is exposed. The cortex is a more moist and sticky part of the hair than the outer layer and the affected hairs adhere to one another and other unaffected hairs. Several factors may contribute to this condition: chemical exposure, hair with natural kinks, hair extensions, quality of water and shampoo, or absence of hair grooming and poor hair-care techniques. It may also be caused or accompanied by lice infestation (pediculosis) leading to inflammation of the scalp, or the mass can become malodorous.

== As a hairstyle ==
In his book Inventing Eastern Europe: The Map of Civilization on the Mind of Enlightenment Larry Wolff mentions that in Poland, for about a thousand years, some people wore the hair style of the Scythians. Zygmunt Gloger in his Encyklopedia staropolska mentions that Polish plait was worn as a hair style by some people, regardless of gender, in the Pinsk region and the Masovia region at the beginning of the 19th century. He used the term "kołtun zapuszczony" which denotes artificial formation of Polish plait. According to folklore studies today, the style was formed using liquids or wax. Among liquids, a mixture of wine and sugar was used or hair was washed daily with water in which herbs had been boiled. The most commonly used herb was vinca (Vinca major), followed by Lycopodium clavatum and moss, which caused hair to matt. A similar effect can be obtained by rubbing hair with wax or inserting a piece of a candle at the ends of the hair. Newer Polish dictionaries mention plica as a disease but the old ones also mention artificially created plica.

In modern times the hairstyle is also known as mono-dreadlock (or mono-dread for short), alluding to how its structure is comparable to a single, massive strand of a dreadlock hairstyle, as well as beaver tail as the mass of hair may resemble the tail of a beaver. The hairstyle can vary in size, from large beaver tails to small plaits.

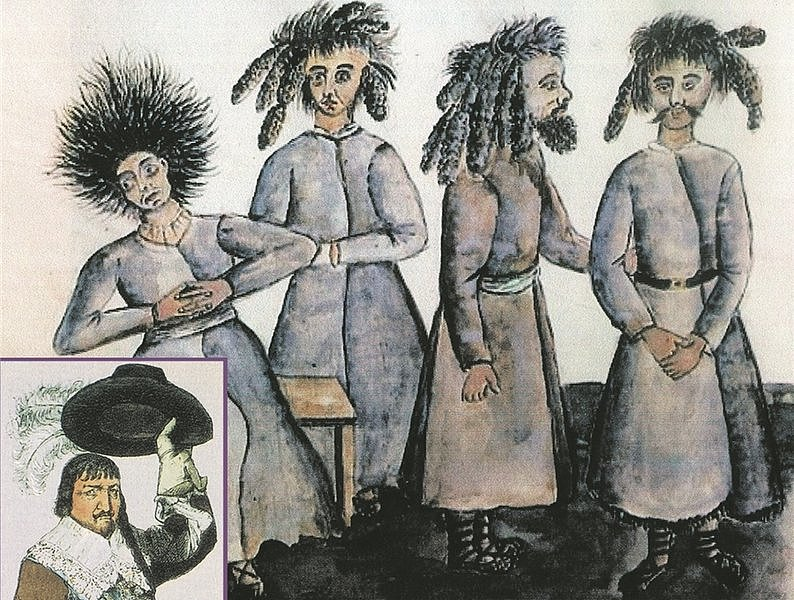
A drawing of peasants with "Polish Plaits"

== History ==
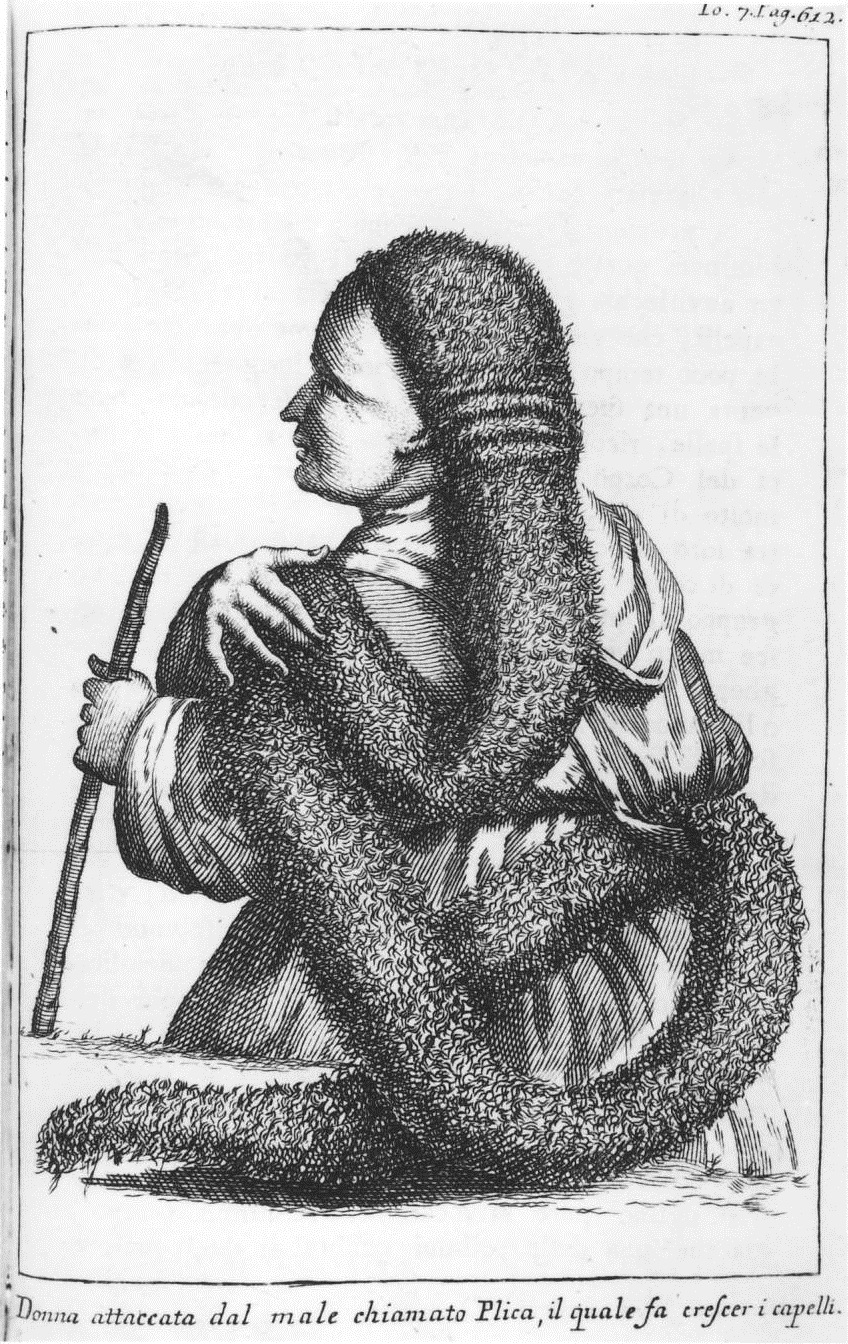
Early 18th-century copper engraving of plica polonica

The Polish plait was quite common in Europe during past centuries when hair grooming was largely neglected. It affected mostly the peasantry but was not unusual among higher social classes.

Owing to superstitious beliefs, the Polish plait used to be particularly common in the Polish–Lithuanian Commonwealth, hence its English and Latin name. Similarly, in German it is called Weichselzopf, or Vistula braid, zopf meaning a braid and the Vistula being a river in Poland. Initially the plait was considered an amulet to keep illness away from the body, as it was believed that when disease resolved it left the body to live in the hair, resulting in lessened suffering. For this reason people not only allowed it to develop but even encouraged it. According to M. Marczewska, who researched the subject from the perspective of folklore studies, animistic beliefs and long-held pagan beliefs viewed illness as caused by an invading evil spirit, which by convalescence left the body and was less problematic when living in the hair formation, which was then shed naturally or cut and ritualistically disposed of by persons specializing in folk medicine or practitioners of folk magic. As people believed that the formation of plica was a sign of resolving of disease, plica, as a hairstyle, was also formed artificially by washing with mixtures of herbs and sweetened wine, waxing, etc.

In the early 17th century people began to believe plaits were an external symptom of an internal illness. A growing plait was supposed to take the illness out of the body and therefore it was rarely cut off; in addition the belief that a cut-off plait could avenge itself and bring an even greater illness discouraged some from attacking it. It was also believed that casting a magic spell on someone could cause that person to develop a Polish plait, hence also the name "elflock" was used in English, also Hexenzopf (witches' plait) in German.

These convictions were so widespread and strong that some people lived their whole lives with a Polish plait. A plait could sometimes grow very long – even up to 80 centimetres (31 in). Polish plaits could take various forms, from a ball of hair to a long tail. Plaits were even categorized: plaits were "male" and "female", "inner" and "outer", "noble" and "fake", "proper" and "parasitical".

British diarist Hester Thrale, in her book Observations and Reflections Made in the Course of a Journey through France, Italy, and Germany, described a Polish plait she saw in 1786 in the collection of the Elector of Saxony in Dresden: "the size and weight of it was enormous, its length four yards and a half [about 4.1 m]; the person who was killed by its growth was a Polish lady of quality well known in King Augustus's court."

During the Age of Enlightenment it became common to use the terms plica polonica (Polish plait) and plica judaica (Jewish plait) as well as the term ‘Polish ringworm’ in English. In addition to antisemitism, there was also prejudice against Poles who were advised to avoid cutting plica. According to Larry Wolff's book The Invention of Eastern Europe, Poles were inaccurately considered "semi-Asians", the descendants of Tatars and barbarians. Maurice Fishberg in his book The Jews: A Study of Race and Environment mentions both terms. It was a common belief that plica was a contagious disease that originated in Poland after the Mongol invasion and later spread to other countries. Diderot wrote in his Encyclopédie (due to his misunderstanding of Martin Cromer's text) that the Tatar invasion of Poland was the source of plica. An example of the belief in the spread of plica as a contagious disease by foreign hosts was the Victorian-era British belief that the plica was spread like a disease by Polish traders in artificial hair. George Lefevre, in his book An Apology for the Nerves (1844), mentions the terms plica polonica and plica judaica and also debunks the popular belief that wearing the Polish national costume could cause plica in the wearer. He describes the case of a woman in Berlin who did not wear the Polish national costume, yet was affected with plica. He concluded, "Neither, therefore, are strangers free from it, nor is produced by dress alone."

Zygmunt Gloger in his Encyklopedia Staropolska argued that according to research done by the Grimm Brothers and Rosenbaum, plica polonica and the idea that it spread from Poland was an error, as it was also found among the Germanic population of Bavaria and Rhine River area. He said that the word weichselzopf (Vistula plait) was a later alteration of the name wichtelzopf (plait of a wight); wichtel means wight in German, a being or sentient thing.

In the second half of the 19th century, some medical professionals waged a war against superstition and lack of hygiene among the peasantry, and traditional folk medicine. Many plaits, often to the horror of their owners, were cut off. In Western Galicia, Professor Józef Dietl made a particular effort to examine and treat Polish plaits. He was also a politician, and his methods of dealing with persons with plicas are controversial today: he organized an official census of people suffering from the disease, they were not allowed to receive help by charitable organizations, were forbidden entrance to some buildings such as schools and offices, and he also proposed fines, which spawned rumors that plaits would be taxed. Those practices were said to have helped eradicate the Polish plait in the region. A huge 1.5-meter long plica can be seen preserved in the Museum of the Faculty of Medicine of Jagiellonian University Medical College in Kraków. In the areas of the Polish–Lithuanian Commonwealth which were occupied by the Russian Empire, young men with plica were exempt from service in the tsarist army. It is unknown how many plicas were natural or how many were man-made dreadlocks. The Polish word for the Polish plait, kołtun, is now used figuratively in Poland to denote an uneducated person with an old-fashioned mindset.

== In folklore ==
Plica was believed to be caused by supernatural entities. The names often describe the believed cause of tangled hair. In Britain this condition was believed to be caused by elves, hence the name "elflock" (mentioned in Shakespearean poetry and folk tales), although this term could refer to tangles much milder than a Polish plait. Folk belief in Germany associated it with witches or wights (Hexen or Wichtel) giving plica the names Hexenzopf or Wichtelzopf; in Poland, the cause was an unclean spirit. One of the names of plica in Polish was wieszczyca, "wieszcz" means bard, specifically, a folk poet with the gift of prophesy or a vampire-like living person. In German folklore, plica appears in one of the Brothers Grimm's fairy tales, in which a girl doesn't comb her hair for one year and finds golden coins in her plica.

Many illnesses were associated with plica and were synonymous with the folk name for this condition. According to Marczewska, about thirty diseases were associated with plica in Polish folklore. In German and Bohemian spells, there are as many as seventy diseases. Poles were afraid to upset the unclean spirit, and, to pacify it, inserted offerings such as coins into the plica. Kołtun (or gościec, its Polish folk name) did not necessarily describe only the hair formation, it also described the bodily illness without the presence of tangled hair. Pain (especially in joints), rheumatism, etc. were synonymous with it. If plica was present, it was blamed for whims and cravings, which needed to be satisfied promptly; people around a person with plica needed to assist the sufferer to comply with the cravings. Marczewska points out that one old Polish dictionary stated that kołtun created strong cravings, especially for wine (which was imported and expensive).

== See also ==
- Uncombable hair syndrome
- Dreadlocks
- List of hairstyles
